= ANZAC Squadron =

- Active: February 12 – March 30, 1942
- Country: Australia; New Zealand; United States
- Allegiance: Allies of World War II
- Type: Cruiser/destroyer force
- Role: Defense of Australia and Commonwealth territories
- Engagements: World War II: Battle for Australia; New Guinea Campaign

Commanders
- Notable commanders: John Gregory Crace

The ANZAC Squadron, also called the Allied Naval Squadron, was an Allied naval warship task force that was tasked with defending northeast Australia and surrounding area in early 1942 during the Pacific Campaign of World War II. The squadron, consisting of cruisers and destroyers from the navies of Australia, New Zealand, and the United States, was formed on February 12, 1942, under the command of Royal Navy Rear Admiral John Gregory Crace. The squadron was the primary fleet element operating in the ANZAC Area under the overall command of United States Navy Vice Admiral Herbert Fairfax Leary.

On 9 March, the squadron, as part of Task Force 11 known as Task Group 11.7, covered the Louisiade Archipelago, securing the right hand flank of Task Force 11 and Task Force 17 for the attack on Lae and Salamaua due to the Imperial Japanese invasion of Lae-Salamaua, New Guinea, and also covering a Port Moresby reinforcement convoy. On April 22, 1942, the ANZAC Force was absorbed by the South West Pacific Area (command) under United States Army General Douglas MacArthur and the ANZAC Squadron was redesignated as Task Force 44. The New Zealand cruisers passed to the control of the South Pacific Area.

== Ships of the task force ==
- Heavy cruisers USS Astoria (9 – 14 March), Chicago (from 9 March), Louisville (9 – 14 March) and HMAS Australia
- Light cruisers HMNZS Achilles and Leander
- Destroyers USS Anderson (9 – 14 March), Sims, Hammann (9 – 14 March) and Hughes

== Bibliography ==
- Gill, G. Hermon (1968). Volume I – Royal Australian Navy, 1939–1942. Australia in the War of 1939–1945, Series 2: Navy. Canberra: Australian War Memorial.
- Gill, G. Hermon (1968). Volume II – Royal Australian Navy, 1942–1945. Australia in the War of 1939–1945, Series 2: Navy. Canberra: Australian War Memorial.
- Willmott, H. P. (1982). Empires in the Balance: Japanese and Allied Pacific Strategies to April 1942. Annapolis, Maryland: Naval Institute Press. ISBN 0-87021-535-3.
- Willmott, H. P. (1983). The Barrier and the Javelin: Japanese and Allied Pacific Strategies February to June 1942. Annapolis, Maryland: Naval Institute Press. ISBN 0-87021-535-3.
