= ANZAC Area =

ANZAC Area (Command)
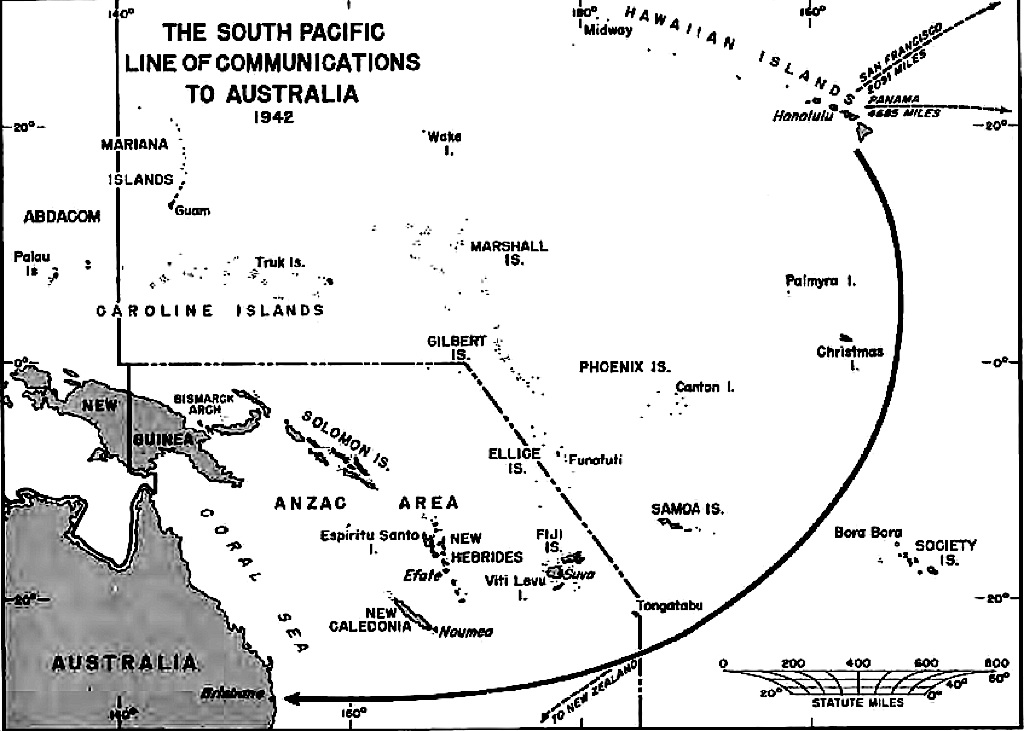
- South Pacific Lines of Communication to Australia 1942
- Active: 27 January – 22 April 1942
- Country: Australia; New Zealand; United States
- Allegiance: Allies of World War II
- Branch: Navy
- Type: Multinational naval air and sea support
- Role: Defense of Australia and Commonwealth territories
- Engagements: World War II: Battle for Australia; New Guinea Campaign

Commanders
- Notable commanders: Herbert Fairfax Leary

The ANZAC Area, also called the ANZAC Command, was a short-lived (29 January – 18 April 1942) naval military command for Allied forces defending the northeast approaches to Australia including the Fiji Islands, New Hebrides, and New Caledonia during the early stages of the Pacific Campaign of World War II. The command was created on 27 January 1942. United States Navy Vice Admiral Herbert Fairfax Leary commanded the force. The force co-existed with the Allied ABDA command which was charged with defending Allied colonial territories in Southeast Asia and the Southwest Pacific from Imperial Japanese aggression.

The ANZAC Area command was established by the United States Joint Chiefs of Staff and the Allied Combined Chiefs of Staff on 29 January 1942 in response to an Australian government request for a command dedicated solely to the protection of Australia after the fall of Singapore and Rabaul during which ABDA Command was focused on events in Java and the Malay barrier to the west and United States fleet assets were focused on defense of Hawaii.

== Creation ==
The Australian Prime Minister, John Curtin, had insisted Australia's defenses be augmented as the Japanese advances in the ABDA area continued and the United States Pacific fleet assets were focused on threats to Hawaii and the central Pacific and the United States Navy had refused to take full responsibility for the eastern approaches to Australia's vital lines of communication. The fall of Rabaul alarmed Australia and the earlier study as a result of Admiral King's concern had proposed an area command covering those approaches with air and naval forces supplied by Australia and New Zealand with the assistance of the United States under the direction of an American flag officer under Commander in Chief of the Pacific Fleet. The plan, coordinated with the British First Sea Lord, had been submitted to the Australian government 8 January but for unknown reasons was delayed about two weeks until the Japanese capture of Rabaul on 23 January when Prime Minister Curtin agreed, but with assumptions about the U.S. Pacific Fleet that took another week to resolve. Formal establishment took place on 29 January 1942.

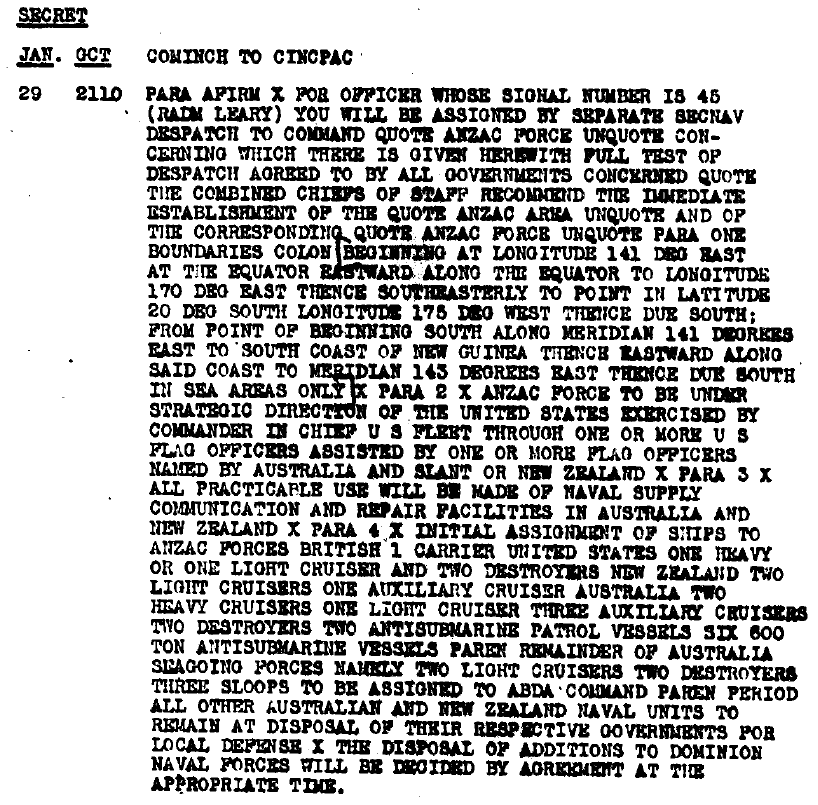
29 2110 JAN 1942 message designating ANZAC Area and force.

Admiral Chester Nimitz was notified in a message dated 29 January that Admiral Leary was assigned to command ANZAC Force within the ANZAC Area defined and agreed to by all concerned governments. The ANZAC Force assigned to the area was to be under the strategic direction of the United States through Commander in Chief United States Fleet through one or more U.S. officers assisted by one or more flag officers named by Australia or New Zealand and composed of ships of listed types. All other Australian and New Zealand naval assets would remain at the disposal of their respective governments.

The ANZAC area included the east coast of Australia, Tasmania, New Zealand, New Caledonia, New Hebrides, Solomon Islands, Papua New Guinea, and Fiji. Leary reported directly to US Fleet commander Admiral Ernest King. Most of the naval forces assigned to the command were from the Royal Australian Navy, but the United States and New Zealand also contributed warships. The operational naval task unit under the command was called the ANZAC Squadron and was led by UK Rear Admiral John Gregory Crace. The force came under the overall command of Vice Adm Herbert F. Leary, USN, on 7 February at Wellington, New Zealand who then established his headquarters at Melbourne on 11 February.

== Force allocation ==
Unlike ABDA, the ANZAC command was exclusively a naval and air command without responsibility for defense of land areas.

Initial force allocation called for Britain to supply one aircraft carrier, HMS Hermes, but that ship was retained in the Indian Ocean being recalled two days after setting out for Australia from Colombo. The United States was to provide either a heavy or a new light cruiser and two destroyers. New Zealand was to provide two light cruisers and an armed merchant cruiser. Australia was to provide two heavy cruisers, HMAS Australia and HMAS Canberra along with HMAS Adelaide, a light cruiser, the armed merchant cruisers HMAS Kanimbla, HMAS Manoora and HMAS Westralia, two destroyers, two anti-submarine patrol vessels, and six anti-submarine corvettes. Even the Australian ships were problematic with Canberra undergoing a refit and with Adelaide and the armed merchant cruisers engaged in convoy duty.

United States Army B-17 bombers, diverted from Hawaii, arrived to provide land based air support to the naval elements in February. The B-17 squadron, operating under naval command, flew twelve missions out of Fiji and then moved to Townsville where, under Royal Australian Air Force command, they undertook the first American land based bomber raid on Rabaul 23 February.

== Significant events ==
Shortly after the command took effect the transit of what was at the time the largest troop convoy of the war with Task Force 6184, also known as Poppy Force (New Caledonia was code named Poppy), with about 15,000 troops for securing that critical island in the South Pacific air ferry route and sea lanes occurred. Those troops would be organized into the Americal Division after their arrival in New Caledonia. The convoy left New York during 22/23 January and transited the ANZAC area as BT-200 bound for Melbourne. There some elements bound for Australia debarked and those bound for New Caledonia reorganized and transshipped into ships forming convoy ZK-7, departing 7 March and arriving New Caledonia six days later. The convoy was of such importance and the threat of invasion of New Caledonia before troops could arrive that significant forces were allocated by Pacific Fleet to operate in the ANZAC area, including the carrier USS Lexington escorted by the cruisers USS Indianapolis, USS Minneapolis, USS Pensacola and USS San Francisco and ten destroyers.

On 10 March Lexington, joined by USS Yorktown and her escorting cruisers and destroyers along with elements of ANZAC force, after failing to intercept Japanese forces bound for Lae and Salamaua in New Guinea, sent planes from the Gulf of Papua south of the island on raids against those Japanese forces on the north coast sinking four vessels and damaging others. The next day the Townsville-based B-17s made a less effective raid.

Though not under the ANZAC command work begun on Army air fields by the War Department before the outbreak of war in the Pacific continued at Fiji and two, Plaine Des Gaiacs and Tontouta in New Caledonia as well as Townsville in Australia. Ground forces, including the large "Poppy Force" were being sent to the islands for local defense. Those efforts continued throughout the existence of the ANZAC Area command and into the formation of the unified South Pacific Area command.

== Redesignation ==
The end of ANZAC as an area command began in discussions after the fall of Singapore that determined how to best divide responsibilities between the British in India and Burma and the predominant interests of the United States in the Pacific. Decisions reaching the level of Prime Minister Churchill and President Roosevelt and supported by the Combined Chiefs in Washington made a broad decision on a general line that became the division between the Southwest Pacific Area and the British led South East Asia Command. The resulting United States areas of responsibility became The Southwest Pacific and Pacific Ocean Areas with ANZAC split between those areas. Admiral King argued that New Zealand should not become part of the Southwest Pacific Area as it was a critical link in the system of island bases from Hawaii to the region that were essentially a problem of naval, not Army protection. Differences between Army and Navy proposals were decided between 9 and 16 March by the Joint Chiefs of Staff. The South Pacific Area, a sub area of the Pacific Ocean Areas, would have a designated commander under Nimitz with some of the international aspects of the former ANZAC command in force composition.

The command was absorbed and redesignated as part of the Southwest Pacific Area under United States Army General Douglas MacArthur on 18 April 1942 and the South Pacific Area which was in effect, but not yet fully functional, by the time of the Battle of the Coral Sea.

== Bibliography ==
- Craven, Wesley Frank; Cate, James Lea (1983) [1948]. Plans and early operations, January 1939 to August 1942. The Army Air Forces in World War II. Vol. One. Washington, D.C.: Office of Air Force History. ISBN 091279903X. LCCN 83017288.
- Gill, G. Hermon (1957). Royal Australian Navy 1939–1942. Australia in the War of 1939–1945. Series 2 – Navy. Vol. 1. Canberra: Australian War Memorial.
- Gill, G. Hermon (1968). Royal Australian Navy 1942–1945. Australia in the War of 1939–1945. Series 2 – Navy. Vol. 2. Canberra: Australian War Memorial.
- Leighton, Richard M.; Coakley, Robert W. (1955–68). The War Department – Global Logistics And Strategy 1940–1943. United States Army in World War II. Washington, DC: Center of Military History, United States Army. LCCN 55-60001.
- Milner, Samuel (1957). Victory in Papua. United States Army in World War II. Washington, DC: Center of Military History, United States Army. LCCN 56-60004.
- Morton, Louis (1962). The War in the Pacific—Strategy and Command: The First Two Years. United States Army in World War II. Washington, D. C.: Center of Military History, United States Army. LCCN 61-60001.
- Nimitz, Chester W.; Steele, James M. (1942). 'Gray Book' – War Plans and Files of the Commander-in-Chief, Pacific Fleet; Running Estimate and Summary maintained by Captain James M. Steele, USN, CINCPAC staff at Pearl Harbor, Hawaii, covering the period 7 December 1941–31 August 1942 (PDF). Vol. 1. Washington Navy Yard, Washington D.C.: Operational Archives, Naval History and Heritage Command.
- Williams, Mary H. (1960). Chronology 1941–1945. United States Army in World War II. Washington, DC: Center of Military History, United States Army. LCCN 59-60002.
