= USS Portland (CA-33) =

American lead ship of Portland-class

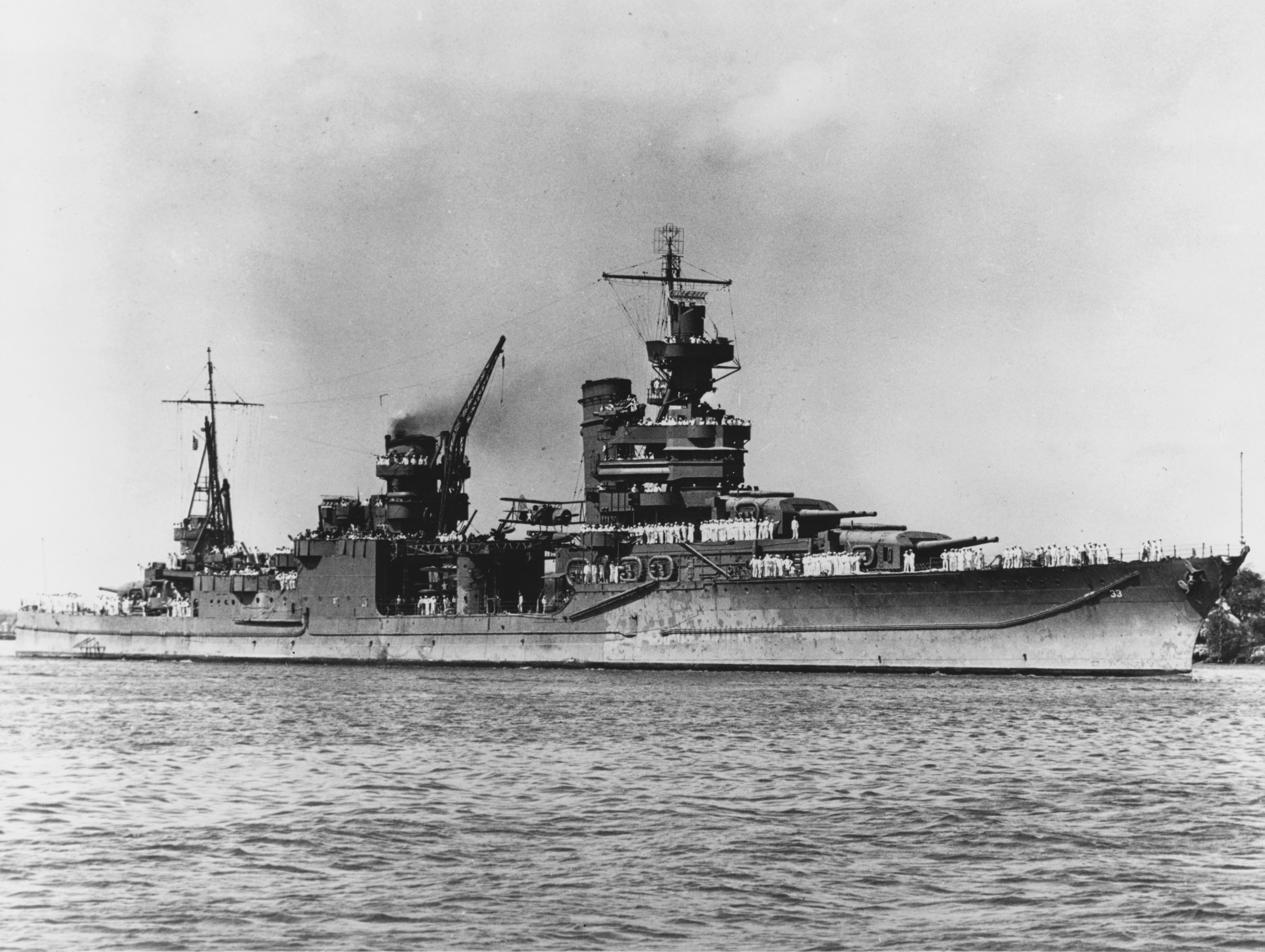
- USS Portland (CA-33), at Pearl Harbor, Hawaii, on 14 June 1942

History

United States
- Name: Portland
- Namesake: City of Portland, Maine
- Ordered: 13 February 1929
- Awarded: 15 August 1929
- Builder: Bethlehem Shipbuilding Corporation's Fore River Shipyard, Quincy, Massachusetts
- Cost: $10,753,000 (contract price)
- Laid down: 17 February 1930
- Launched: 21 May 1932
- Sponsored by: Mrs. Ralph D. Brooks
- Completed: 15 August 1932
- Commissioned: 23 February 1933
- Decommissioned: 12 July 1946
- Stricken: 1 March 1959
- Identification: Hull symbol: CL-33; Hull symbol:CA-33; Code letters: NACB
- Nickname(s): "Sweet Pea"
- Honors and awards: 16 × battle stars
- Fate: Sold for scrap, 6 October 1959

General characteristics (as built)
- Class & type: Portland-class cruiser
- Displacement: 9,800 long tons (9,957 t) (standard)
- Length: 610 ft 3 in (186.00 m) oa; 582 ft (177 m) wl
- Beam: 66 ft 1 in (20.14 m)
- Draft: 17 ft 1 in (5.21 m) (mean); 24 ft (7.3 m) (max)
- Installed power: 8 × Yarrow boilers; 107,000 shp (80,000 kW)
- Propulsion: 4 × Parsons reduction steam turbines; 4 × screws
- Speed: 32.7 kn (60.6 km/h; 37.6 mph)
- Range: 10,000 nmi (19,000 km; 12,000 mi) @ 15 kn (28 km/h; 17 mph)
- Capacity: Fuel oil: 1,600 long tons (1,626 t)
- Complement: 91 officers 757 enlisted men
- Armament: 9 × 8 in (203 mm)/55 caliber guns (3x3); 8 × 5 in (127 mm)/25 caliber anti-aircraft guns; 2 × 3-pounder 47 mm (1.9 in) saluting guns; 8 × caliber 0.50 in (12.7 mm) machine guns
- Armor: Belt: 3 1/4–5 in (83–127 mm); Deck: 2 1/2 in (64 mm); Barbettes: 1 1/2 in (38 mm); Turrets: 1 1/2–2 1/2 in (38–64 mm); Conning Tower: 1 1/4 in (32 mm)
- Aircraft carried: 4 × floatplanes
- Aviation facilities: 2 × Amidship catapults

General characteristics (1945)
- Armament: 9 × 8 in (203 mm)/55 caliber guns (3x3); 8 × 5 in (127 mm)/25 caliber anti-aircraft guns; 2 × 3-pounder 47 mm (1.9 in) saluting guns; 4 × quad 40 mm (1.6 in) Bofors anti-aircraft guns; 4 × twin 40 mm (1.6 in) Bofors anti-aircraft guns; 17 × single 20 mm (0.79 in) Oerlikon anti-aircraft cannons

USS Portland (CL/CA–33) was the lead ship of the Portland class of cruiser and the first ship of the United States Navy named after the city of Portland, Maine. Launched in 1932, she completed a number of training and goodwill cruises in the interwar period before seeing extensive service during World War II, beginning with the Battle of the Coral Sea in 1942, where she escorted the aircraft carrier Yorktown and picked up survivors from the sunken carrier Lexington. She screened for Yorktown again in the Battle of Midway, picking up her survivors as well. She then supported the carrier Enterprise during the initial phase of the Guadalcanal campaign later that year, and was torpedoed during the Naval Battle of Guadalcanal. The torpedo inflicted heavy damage which put her out of action for six months as she was repaired in Sydney, Australia, and later San Diego, California.

Returning to combat in mid-1943, Portland saw action in many of the major engagements of the Pacific War, conducting shore bombardments in support of campaigns at the Aleutian Islands, Gilbert and Marshall Islands, Mariana Islands, and New Guinea. She was involved in the October 1944 Battle of Leyte Gulf, engaging Japanese ships in the decisive Battle of Surigao Strait. She then conducted shore bombardments at Lingayen Gulf and Corregidor Island, and in 1945 supported landings during the Battle of Okinawa until the end of the war.

Following World War II, Portland accepted the Japanese surrender in the Caroline Islands and then undertook several Operation Magic Carpet cruises to bring U.S. troops home. She was decommissioned in 1946 and scrapped by 1962. In her extensive service she accrued 16 battle stars, making her one of the most decorated ships in the U.S. fleet.

== Design and construction ==
Portland was the lead ship of the third class of "treaty cruisers" to be constructed by the United States Navy following the Washington Naval Treaty of 1922, following the two vessels of the Pensacola class ordered in 1926 and the six vessels of the Northampton class ordered in 1927. Ordered for the U.S. Navy in Fiscal Year 1930. Portland was originally designated as a light cruiser, because of her thin armor, and given the hull classification symbol CL-33. She was reclassified a heavy cruiser, because of her 8-inch guns, with the symbol CA-33 on 1 July 1931, in accordance with the London Naval Treaty.

Portland was designed for a standard displacement of 10,258 long tons (10,423 t), and a full-load displacement of 12,755 long tons (12,960 t). However, Portland only displaced 9,800 long tons (9,957 t) when completed. In 1943, a light tripod was added forward of the second funnel on the ship, and a prominent fire-control director was installed aft.

Her four Parsons GT geared turbines each drove a propeller shaft using steam provided by eight Yarrow boilers. Portland's power plant generated 107,000 shaft horsepower (80,000 kW) and she had a designed maximum speed of 32 knots (59 km/h; 37 mph). The ship reached, however, 32.7 knots (60.6 km/h; 37.6 mph) on sea trials. She rolled badly until fitted with bilge keels. Portland was designed for a range of 10,000 nautical miles (19,000 km; 12,000 mi) at 15 knots (28 km/h; 17 mph).

The ship was armed with a main battery of nine Mark 9 8"/55 caliber guns arrayed in three triple mounts, a superfiring pair forward and one aft. She was armed with eight 5"/25 caliber guns for anti-aircraft defense, and she also had two QF 3 pounder Hotchkiss saluting guns. In 1945, her anti-aircraft defenses were upgraded, receiving 24 Bofors 40 mm guns which were arranged in four quad mounts and four twin mounts. Portland was also upgraded with seventeen Oerlikon 20 mm cannons.

She was originally designed with 1 inch (25 mm) of armor for deck and side protection, but during construction her armor was increased. As completed, the ship was protected with 3.25 inches (83 mm) of belt armor which increased to 5 inches (130 mm) around the magazines. Her armor was between 2 inches (51 mm) and 5.75 inches (146 mm) thick on the transverse bulkheads, while armor on her main deck was 2.5 inches (64 mm) thick. Armor on her barbettes was 1.5 inches (38 mm) thick, armor on her gunhouses was 2.5 inches (64 mm) thick, and armor on her conning tower was 1.25 inches (32 mm) thick.

Additionally, Portland-class cruiser USS Indianapolis CA-35 was designed with space to be outfitted as a fleet flagship, with accommodations for an Admiral and his staff to operate. The class also featured two aircraft catapult amidships, and she could carry four aircraft which were stored in a hangar. Her total crew complement varied, with a regular designed crew complement of 848, a wartime complement of 952, and a complement 1,229 when the cruiser was operating as a fleet flagship.

Portland was laid down by Bethlehem Steel at its Quincy Shipyard on 17 February 1930. The machinery was provided by the builders. Portland was launched on 21 May 1932 and commissioned on 23 February 1933. She was the first ship named for the city of Portland, Maine, and sponsored by the daughter of Mayor Ralph D. Brooks of Portland, and with Captain Herbert F. Leary as her first commander. Her sailors would later nickname her "Sweet Pea."

== Service history ==
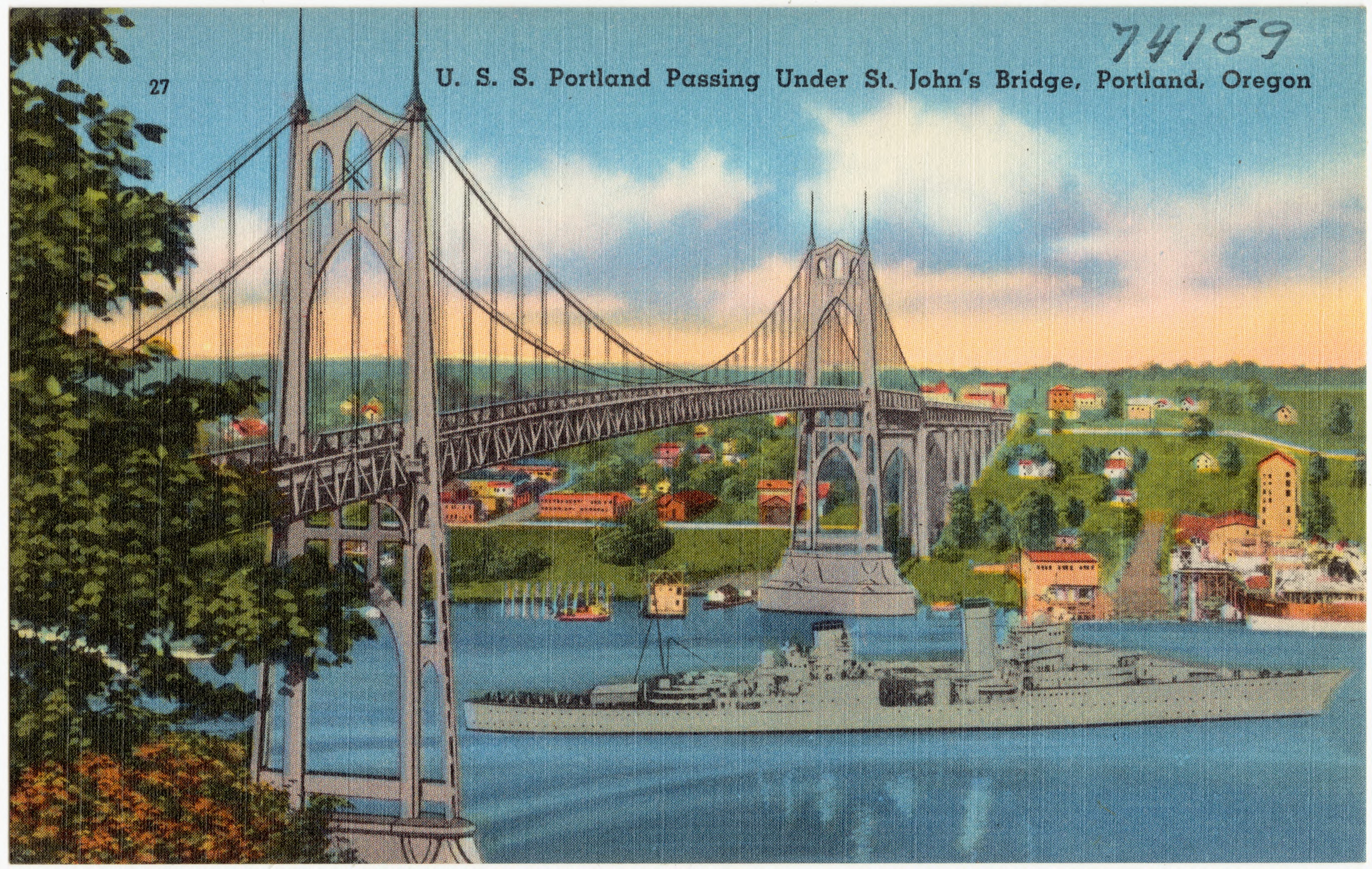
USS Portland (CA-33) passing under St. John's Bridge, Portland, Oregon, in the 1930s

Departing Boston on 1 April 1933, the cruiser arrived Gravesend Bay, New York late in the day on 3 April. The next evening, she was dispatched on her first assignment to the scene of the airship Akron, which had crashed at sea. Thirty six minutes after receiving the message, she was underway and en route to the crash site. She was the first Navy vessel on scene, and began coordinating the search and rescue effort with other ships arriving. In spite of her efforts, 73 were killed in the crash, including Admiral William Moffett, Chief of the Bureau of Aeronautics.

Portland steamed from San Diego, California, on 2 October 1935 along with Houston, which was carrying President Franklin D. Roosevelt. The president spent much of his trip fishing with his party. After visiting Panama and several other ports, the two ships steamed to Charleston, South Carolina, where the President disembarked. Portland spent the remainder of the interwar era with the Scouting Force, Cruiser Division 5 and later in the United States Pacific Fleet conducting peacetime training and a number of goodwill missions. She crossed the equator for the first time on 20 May 1936 during fleet maneuvers.

When the Japanese attacked Pearl Harbor on 7 December 1941, Portland was two days away, en route to Midway Atoll as part of a carrier group escorting aircraft carrier Lexington. From December 1941 to 1 May 1942, she operated between the West Coast, Hawaii, and Fiji on patrol.

=== Battle of Coral Sea ===
Portland joined Task Force 17 (TF 17), commanded by Rear Admiral Frank Jack Fletcher and centered around the carrier Yorktown escorted by Portland as well as cruisers Astoria and Chester plus the destroyers Hammann, Anderson, Perkins, Morris, Russell, and Sims and oiler Neosho and Tippecanoe. TF 17 departed Tongatabu on 27 April en route to the Coral Sea. On the morning of 1 May, TF 17 joined with Task Force 11 (TF 11) about 300 nmi (350 mi; 560 km) northwest of New Caledonia. TF 17 completed refueling the next day, but TF 11 reported that they would not be finished fueling until 4 May. Fletcher elected to take TF 17 northwest towards the Louisiades.

At 17:00 on 3 May, Fletcher was notified that a force of Japanese troops had been sighted at Tulagi the day before, approaching the southern Solomons. TF 17 changed course and proceeded at 27 kn (31 mph; 50 km/h) towards Guadalcanal to launch airstrikes against the Japanese forces at Tulagi the next morning. On 4 May, from a position 100 nmi (120 mi; 190 km) south of Guadalcanal (11°10′S 158°49′E), TF 17 launched airstrikes against Japanese forces off Tulagi. After recovering its aircraft late in the evening of 4 May, TF17 retired towards the south. The next morning, TF 17 rendezvoused with TF 11 and Task Force 44 (TF 44) at a predetermined point 320 nmi (370 mi; 590 km) south of Guadalcanal (15°S 160°E). Prompted by reports the Japanese would attack Port Moresby, the force moved to the Louisiades to engage the Japanese the next day. Portland was assigned to Task Group 17.2 under Rear Admiral Thomas C. Kinkaid together with cruisers Minneapolis, New Orleans, Astoria, Chester, and five destroyers from Destroyer Squadron One. She screened for Yorktown throughout the operation, including during Japanese air attacks on the two carriers on 8 May. Following the battle, she was to escort the damaged Lexington, but after fires on that carrier became uncontrollable she was abandoned and sunk. Portland took on 722 of her survivors. She suffered no casualties herself, though at least four of her sailors were transferred to the Neosho shortly before the battle and were lost when that ship was sunk.

=== Battle of Midway ===
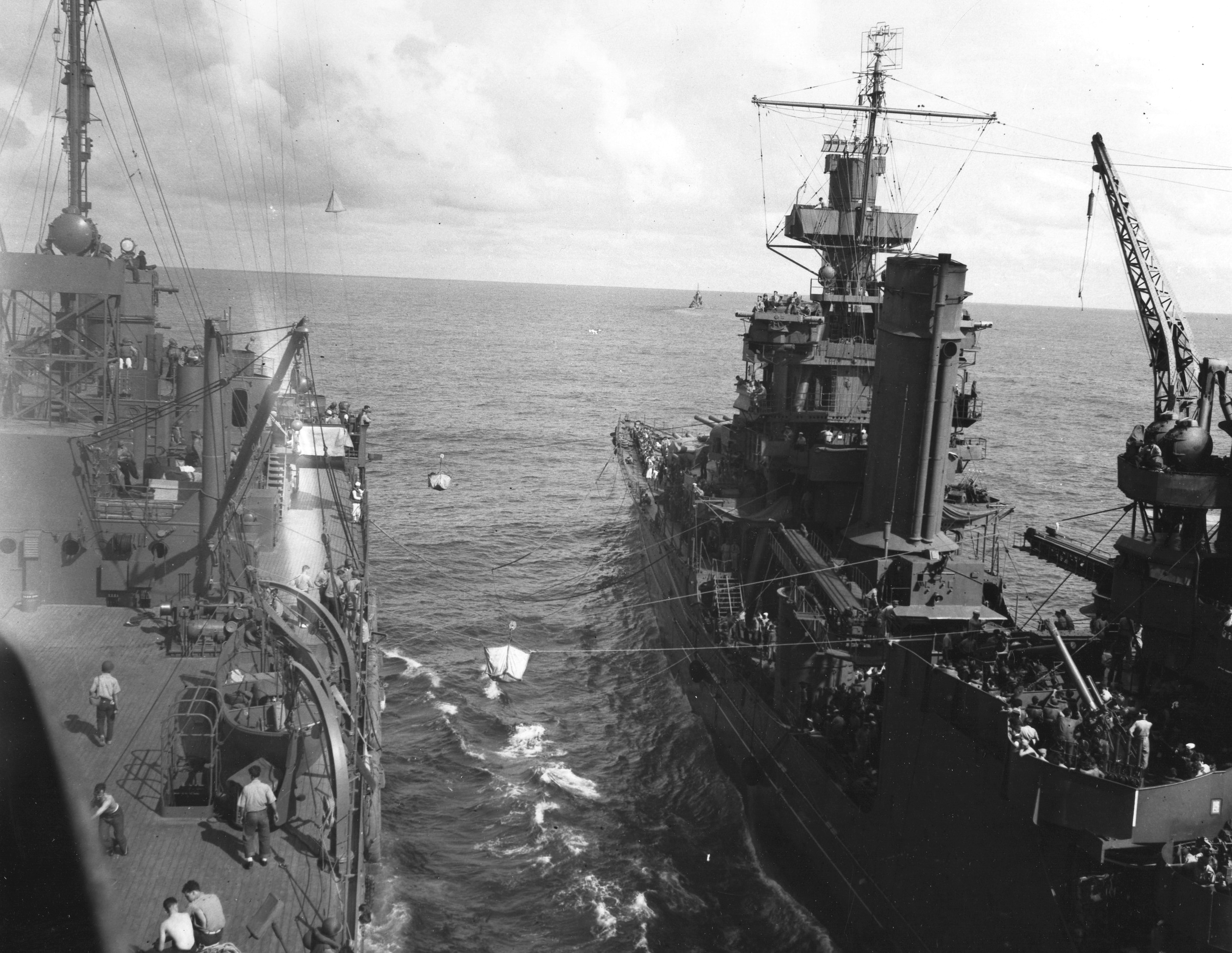
Portland, right, transfers survivors of Yorktown to Fulton, left, on 7 June 1942, following the Battle of Midway.

After brief repairs at Tongatabu, Portland took on a new commander, Captain Laurance T. DuBose. She then steamed for Pearl Harbor escorting Yorktown, before heading to Midway Atoll to set a trap for Japanese forces attacking there. On 4 June, after Dive-Bombers from carriers Yorktown and Enterprise had sunk three Japanese carriers, aircraft from Japanese carrier Hiryū responded with an attack on Yorktown that afternoon. Portland was to her port, providing anti-aircraft defense along with cruisers Pensacola and Vincennes. A Japanese air attack came at 14:00 and another after 16:30, and Yorktown was struck several times with torpedoes. With increasing damage, the carrier was abandoned and its survivors picked up by five destroyers and then transferred to Portland. In all, 2,046 of Yorktown's crew transferred to the cruiser. She then steamed toward Pearl Harbor and met the submarine tender Fulton and transferred the Yorktown survivors aboard her on 6 June. During 7 June she searched for downed naval aviators and the next day joined the group of carrier Saratoga. They steamed for the Aleutian Islands to counter a Japanese force there but were recalled to Pearl Harbor two days later.

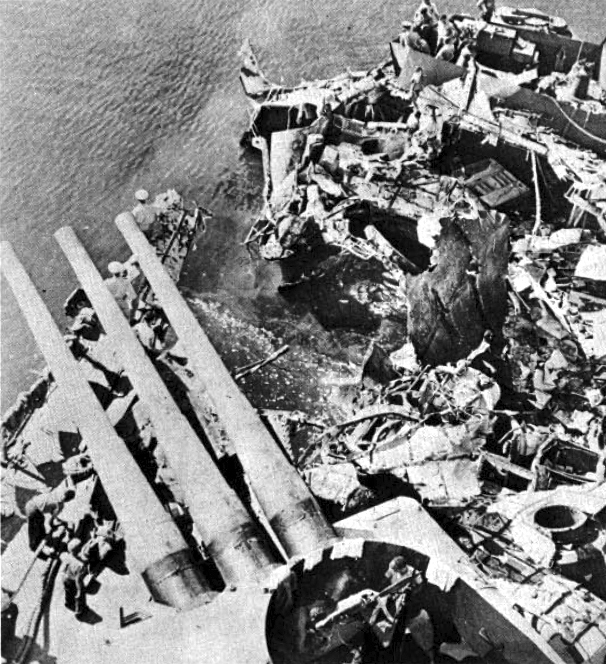
View of the damaged stern of the USS Portland (CA-33) after the Naval Battle of Guadalcanal on 13 November 1942.

=== Guadalcanal campaign ===
Portland accompanied the invasion fleet to Guadalcanal, escorting Enterprise. She remained off the coast protecting the landings at Tulagi and Guadalcanal from 7–9 August. In this duty, she missed the Battle of Savo Island and withdrew two days later following Enterprise. She then remained in the area to support the Guadalcanal operations and to protect communications lines for the attacking forces.

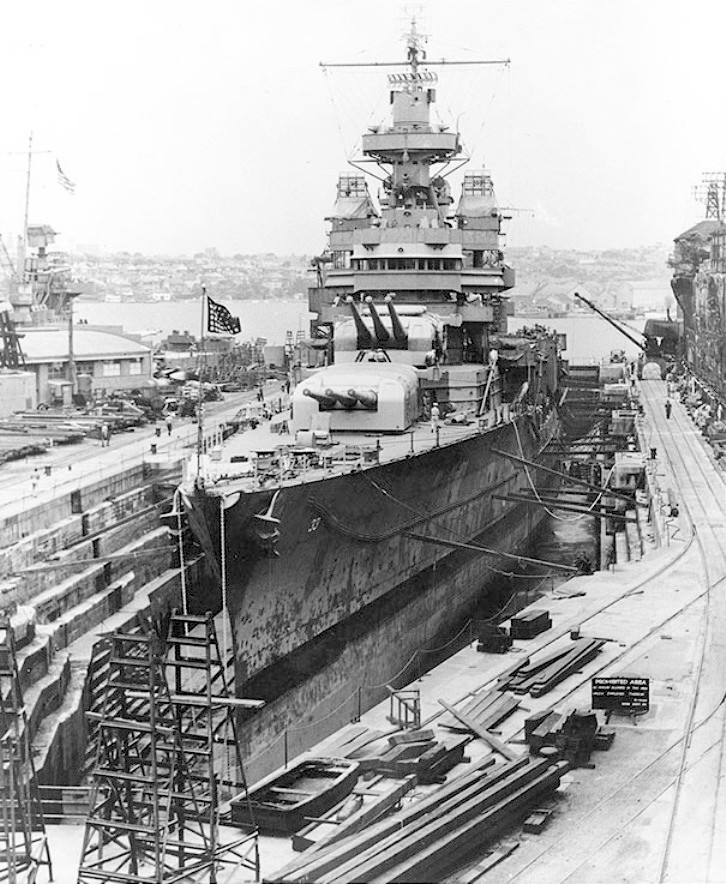
Portland in Sutherland dry dock in Sydney, Australia, in December, 1942, to repair damage suffered during the Naval Battle of Guadalcanal.

Remaining with Enterprise, she later participated in the Battle of the Eastern Solomons. On 24 August she was posted to air defense to the port of Enterprise, and though she and her sisters were able to down a number of Japanese aircraft, the carrier was hit at 18:34. She continued to protect the carrier through 25 August, when Allied forces prevented reinforcement of Japanese units in the Solomons by a large naval armada under Admiral Isoroku Yamamoto. Following the battle she escorted Enterprise to Pearl Harbor and was then ordered on a secret mission to the Gilbert Islands to conduct a raid on Tarawa with light cruiser San Juan. She took aboard Rear Admiral Mahlon S. Tisdale and was designated Task Unit 16.9.1. Between 14:10 and 14:51 on 15 October she attacked Japanese ships near the island, damaging a transport and a destroyer and suffering one damaged aircraft before she withdrew and rejoined the Enterprise task group near the Solomons.

She then steamed south to take part in the Battle of the Santa Cruz Islands as one of the escorts for Enterprise. The carrier came under heavy air attack at 10:12 on 24 October, and Portland suffered her first wartime damage as one of her 1.1-inch (28 mm) guns exploded in firing and again when one of her AA guns depressed too low and damaged the splinter shield, injuring 19 men. In heavy fighting Enterprise was hit once but Portland and the task group shot down several aircraft. At 11:53 the bridge lost control of steering, and before it could regain control, a Japanese submarine was spotted. The submarine struck Portland with three torpedoes, but none detonated, likely because the submarine had fired too close and they had no time to arm.

Two weeks later, she participated in the Naval Battle of Guadalcanal from 12–15 November, which resulted in heavy damage to both forces but broke up the determined Japanese effort to disrupt the landing of 6,000 American troops on Guadalcanal, to bombard Henderson Field, and to land 7,000 reinforcements of their own. At the outbreak of the battle, Portland was escorting a convoy traveling to Guadalcanal from New Caledonia as part of Task Force 67. After a four-day journey they arrived and began to offload supplies on 12 November and were countered by a Japanese air attack of 46 aircraft. That night, she was among a force of five cruisers and eight destroyers under Daniel J. Callaghan which steamed to counter an approaching Japanese force. They spotted a Japanese force of two battleships, one cruiser and eleven destroyers and immediately opened fire, sinking the Japanese destroyer Akatsuki. Shortly thereafter, Portland was struck by a torpedo fired by either the destroyer Inazuma or the destroyer Ikazuchi at 01:58, causing heavy damage to her stern. The torpedo struck the starboard side, which blew off both inboard propellers, jammed the rudder five degrees to starboard, and jammed her Number Three turret in train and elevation. A four degree list was quickly corrected by shifting ballast, but the steering problem could not be overcome and the ship was forced to steam in circles to starboard. The blast disrupted her steering column, forcing her to steer in a circle. At the end of her first circle, she fired on the battleship Hiei, with her forward turrets. The Japanese ship returned fire, but all salvos passed over the cruiser. In the four six-gun salvos returned by Portland, she succeeded in starting fires in the Japanese ship. At dawn, she was one of three U.S. ships still too damaged to withdraw on their own power. Then again at 06:30, still circling, Portland opened fire on the abandoned hulk of the destroyer Yūdachi at a range of 6 miles (9.7 km). After the sixth salvo, Yūdachi exploded, rolled over, and sank within five minutes. She was eventually able to correct the steering problem and withdraw on her own power. She later received a Navy Unit Commendation for her actions in the battle. She suffered 18 killed, 17 wounded in the battle.

With the assistance of Higgins boats, a YP, and a tug, Portland anchored at Tulagi on 14 November. From there, she was towed to Sydney, Australia, by the tugboat Navajo and escorted by the destroyers Meade and Zane for preliminary repairs prior to overhaul in the United States. She arrived at Sydney 30 November but did not enter drydock until 24 December after Chester and New Orleans were repaired. During this time the crew was given extended shore leave. Two of the ship's sailors died in accidents during this leave. She left Australia after preliminary repairs, escorted by destroyer HMAS Warramunga. Following short stops at Samoa and Pearl Harbor, the ship arrived at Mare Island Navy Yard on 3 March 1943.

=== 1943–1944 ===
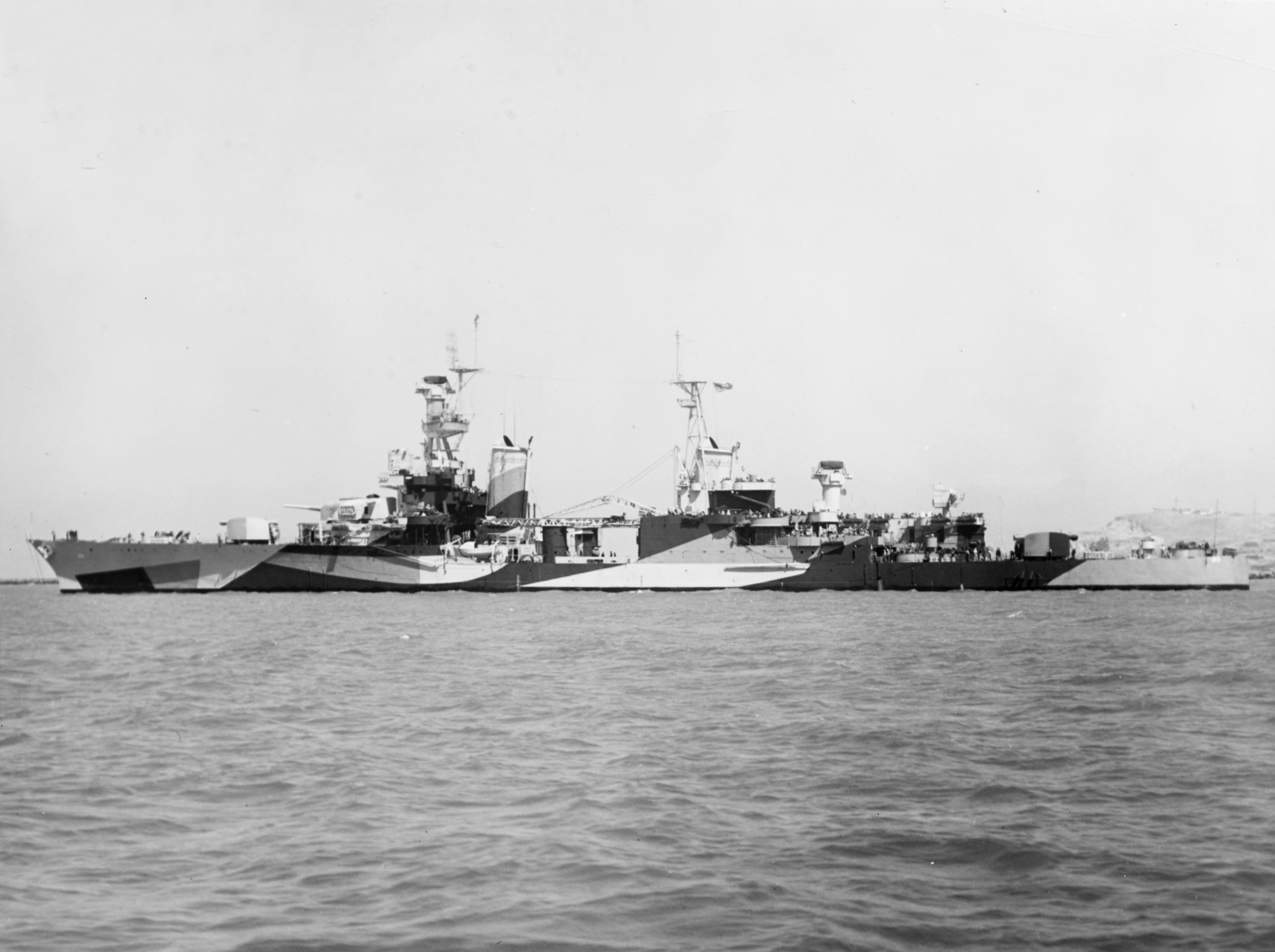
Portland wearing Camouflage Measure 32, Design 7D in 1944.

After operational training in southern Californian waters, Portland steamed for the Aleutians late in May, arriving on 11 June and bombarding Kiska on 26 July. After covering a reconnaissance landing on Little Kiska on 17 August, she called at Pearl Harbor on 23 September, there to San Francisco in early October, then back to Pearl Harbor in mid-October. From November 1943 to February 1944, Portland participated in the Gilbert and Marshall Islands campaigns. She bombarded Tarawa on 20 November supporting landings there for several days. She was lightly damaged by a friendly depth charge when a nearby destroyer erroneously detected a Japanese submarine. In December 1943 she moved to the Marshall Islands escorting the new Essex-class carrier Lexington. While Lexington came under air attack, none of the Japanese planes came within range of Portland and she did not open fire. She returned to Pearl Harbor on 25 December, and went into drydock to repair her rudder and propellers.

After repairs, she joined Task Group 51 under Rear Admiral Harry W. Hill for an attack on Darrit, steaming for that island on 23 January and arriving 30 January. After shelling the island for 30 minutes, it was discovered no Japanese were ashore. She then moved to support operations on Eniwetok Atoll on 8 February, providing shore bombardment on Parry Island ahead of landings which took place on 19 February. She then screened carriers conducting airstrikes at Palau, Yap, Ulithi, and Woleai between 30 March and 1 April. She then joined with a carrier force assigned to cover the landings around Hollandia and Tanahmerah on New Guinea, which took place from 21 to 24 April. She steamed northward with the carrier force and struck Truk with five other cruisers and destroyers. Portland then bombarded Satawan in the Nomei Group. Following this series of operations, Portland returned to Mare Island for a more extensive overhaul, which was completed in August. She returned to the western Pacific for shore bombardments of Peleliu from 12 to 14 September. The cruiser supported the landing on Peleliu on 15 September, providing artillery to support the advance of Allied forces. She provided gunfire support at Peleliu through 29 September, and then steamed for Seeadler Harbor, Manus Island in the Admiralties.

=== Battle of Leyte Gulf ===
Portland next joined Cruiser Division 4 for the next major campaign against the Philippines. She arrived off Leyte on 17 October, entering the Gulf the next day, and began two days of shore bombardments to prepare for the troop landings there. On the night of 24 October, a strong Japanese force consisting of two battleships, one heavy cruiser, and four destroyers headed for Surigao Strait with the apparent intent of raiding shipping in Leyte Gulf. The Japanese force advanced in rough column up the narrow strait during darkness, but was met with a large U.S. force of cruisers, destroyers and battleships, including Portland. She and her sisters steamed across the top of the strait, crossing the T of the Japanese force. The Japanese were first met by PT boats, then in succession by three coordinated destroyer torpedo attacks, and finally by devastating gunfire from American battleships and cruisers disposed across the northern end of the strait. Portland took the Japanese cruiser Mogami under fire, scoring four hits on her at 04:02, striking the compass platform and AA defense center. She continued firing on the Mogami for ten minutes She continued to fire on the stranded Mogami until 05:30, striking several hits, including on the ship's bridge, killing the captain and executive officer. According to the Portland's official war diary, she assisted in the "sinking of two battleships, two destroyers, and in damaging the heavy cruiser during the main action and pursuit" during the battle. The Battle of Surigao Strait was a decisive defeat for the Japanese force, with most of its ships being destroyed.

=== 1945 ===
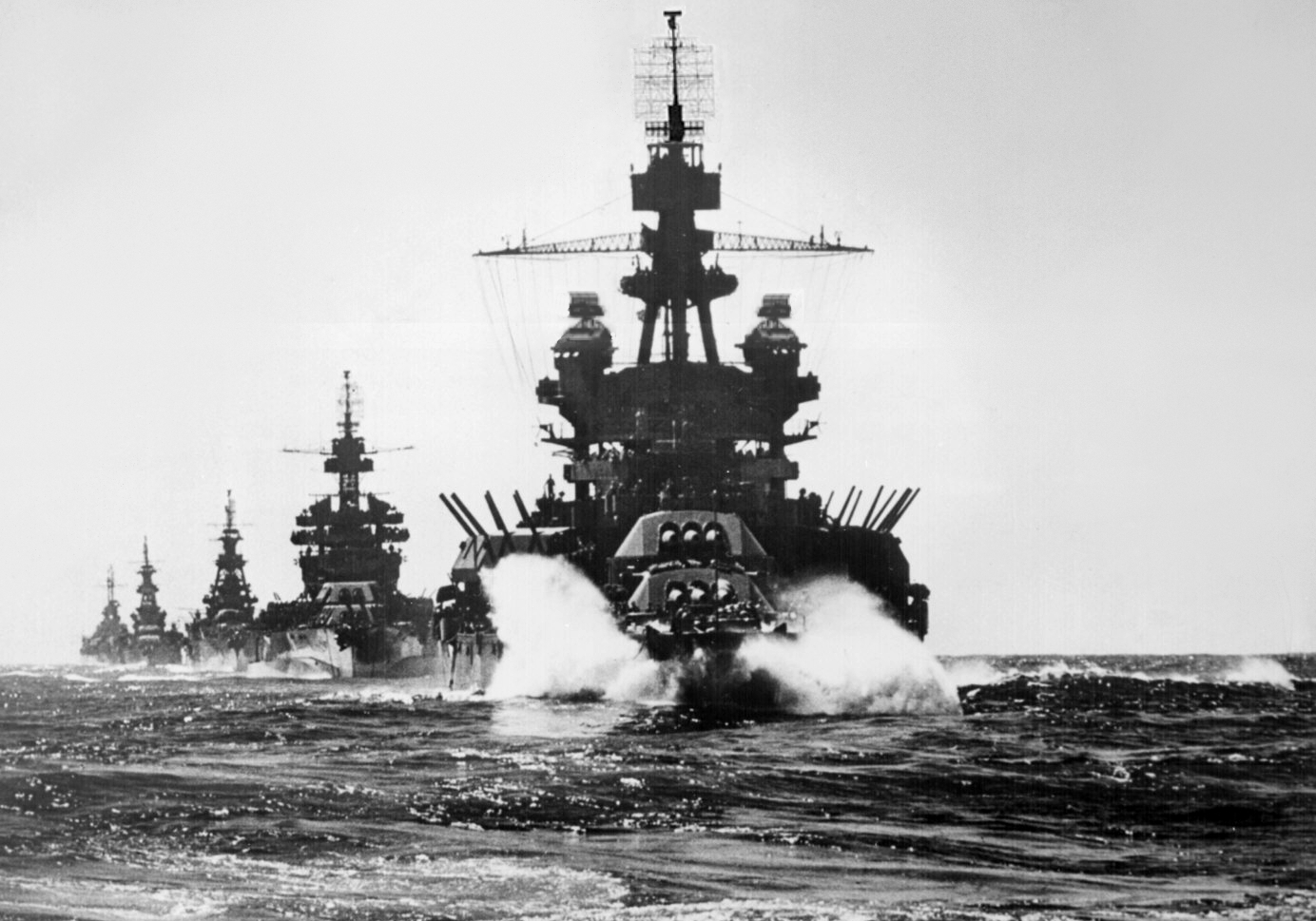
Pennsylvania leading Colorado, Louisville, Portland, and Columbia into Lingayen Gulf in January 1945.

From 3 January to 1 March 1945, Portland participated in the operations at Lingayen Gulf and Corregidor. Arriving off Lingayen Gulf on 5 January, and bombarding the vicinity of Cape Bolinao, she entered the Gulf the same day and commenced bombardment of the eastern shore but discontinued immediately when a large wave of Japanese kamikaze planes approached. Portland entered Manila Bay on 15 February, and bombarded the south shore of Corregidor in preparation for landings there. She returned to Leyte Gulf on 1 March for repairs and replenishment, having seen five months of continuous action.

From 26 March to 20 April, she joined Task Force 54 (TF 54), which conducted shore bombardments of Okinawa in support of the Allied landings during the Okinawa campaign. The Japanese air arm had been decimated by this point in the war, and the lack of trained and experienced pilots led to the most extensive deployment of the kamikaze; Portland endured 24 air raids, shot down four Japanese aircraft, and assisted in downing two others. From 8 May to 17 June, she supported ground forces on Okinawa providing artillery support for ground forces, departing on 17 June for maintenance at Leyte before returning to Buckner Bay on 6 August, where she remained conducting shore bombardments until the end of the war.

== Post-war ==
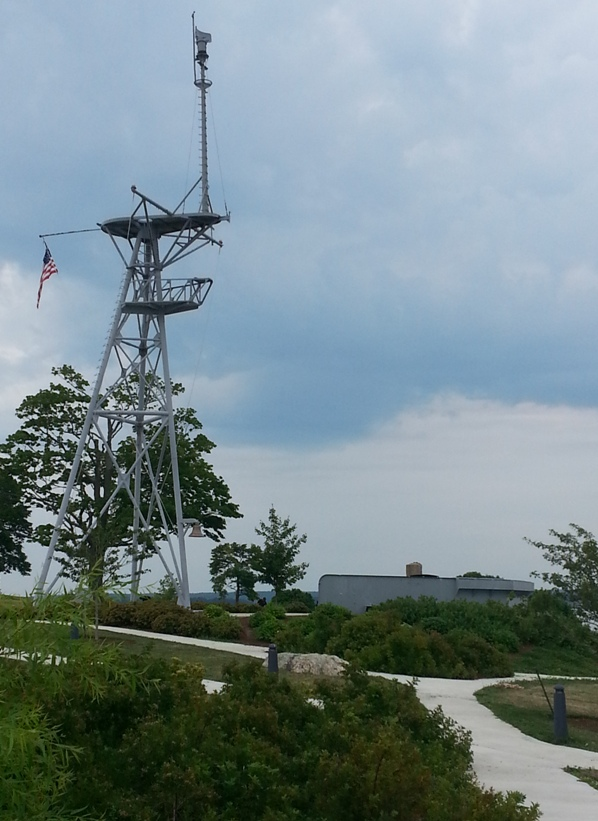
Mainmast and bridge shield from USS Portland, on display at Fort Allen Park.

With the termination of hostilities, Portland was designated flagship of Vice Admiral George D. Murray, Commander Mariana Islands, who was to accept the surrender of the Carolines. The ship steamed to Truk Atoll and there Murray, acting for Fleet Admiral Chester Nimitz, accepted the formal capitulation of the senior Japanese military and civilian officials in ceremonies aboard Portland. She was then selected for Operation Magic Carpet duty, and returned to Pearl Harbor from 21 to 24 September embarking 600 troops for transportation to the United States. She transited the Panama Canal on 8 October and arrived at Portland, Maine, for Navy Day celebrations on 27 October. She then conducted two trans-Atlantic crossings in November and December, bringing troops home from the European Theater. She reported on 11 March 1946 to the Philadelphia Naval Shipyard for inactivation and assignment to the Reserve Fleet. She was decommissioned at Philadelphia Navy Yard on 12 July 1946 and was maintained in the United States Reserve Fleet. While she was identified as one of the few ships that had fought through the entire war and had not missed any major battle, no attempt was made to save her as a museum ship at either Portland, Maine, or Portland, Oregon. She was struck from the Navy List on 1 March 1959 and sold to Union Minerals and Alloys Corp. in New York on 6 October. She was scrapped at Wainwright Shipyard in Panama City, Florida, during 1961 and 1962.

Her tripod mast was preserved at Fort Allen Park, Portland. She received 16 battle stars for World War II service, placing her among the most decorated US Naval vessels of World War II.
