= Task Force 44 =

Allied naval task force in the Pacific theatre of World War II

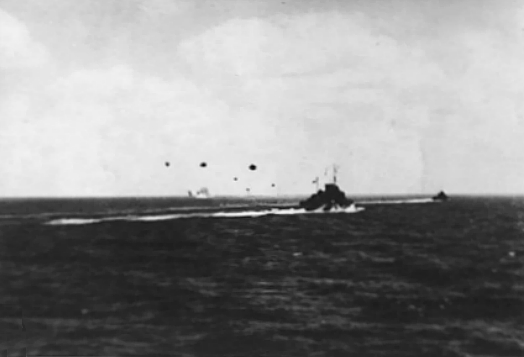
- Task Force 44 (temporarily redesignated as Task Group 17.3) under Japanese air attack on 7 May 1942 during the Battle of the Coral Sea
- Active: 22 April 1942 – 15 March 1943
- Country: United States; Australia
- Branch: United States Navy; Royal Australian Navy
- Role: Naval warship support
- Engagements: World War II: Battle for Australia; New Guinea Campaign; Guadalcanal Campaign

Commanders
- Notable commanders: John Gregory Crace; Victor Crutchley; John Augustine Collins

Task Force 44 was an Allied naval task force during the Pacific Campaign of World War II. The task force consisted of warships from the United States Navy and the Royal Australian Navy (RAN). It was generally assigned as a striking force to defend northeast Australia and the surrounding area from any attacks by Axis forces, particularly from the Empire of Japan.

== History ==
=== 1942 ===
The task force was created on 22 April 1942 from the ANZAC Squadron as part of United States Army General Douglas MacArthur's South West Pacific Area (command). The unit's first commander was Rear Admiral John Gregory Crace (Royal Australian Navy). From 13 June 1942 the task force was commanded by Victor Crutchley, an Australian Rear Admiral of the Royal Navy (UK).

The force saw action during the Battle of the Coral Sea, in which it helped turn back a Japanese attempt to invade Port Moresby, New Guinea.

At the start of May, the Americans learned of an imminent Japanese invasion of Port Moresby, and HMAS Hobart was sent with HMAS Australia to rendezvous with United States forces in the Coral Sea. At 07:00 on 7 May, Rear Admiral Crace, embarked aboard Australia as commander of Task Force 44, was ordered to take his ships (Australia, Hobart, US cruiser Chicago, and US destroyers Perkins, Walke, and Farragut) to the Jomard Passage, and engage any Japanese ships found en route to Port Moresby, while several US carrier groups engaged a Japanese force headed for the Solomon Islands. The ships reached their patrol area around 14:00, fired on a group of eleven unidentified aircraft at maximum range with no damage dealt at 14:27, and were attacked themselves by twelve Japanese twin-engine torpedo bombers at 15:06; no ships were damaged for the loss of five aircraft. At 15:16, nineteen Japanese heavy bombers dropped their payload on the Allied ships; no ships were hit directly, the only casualties (aboard Chicago) were from shrapnel. A few minutes later, the ships were attacked by another three heavy bombers, flying at a higher altitude to the first group; the bombing was much less accurate. It was later learned that the three aircraft belonged to the United States Army Air Forces (USAAF). Although USN Vice Admiral Herbert F. Leary made plans to train aircrews in naval vessel recognition in response, USAAF General George Brett refused to implement them or acknowledge that the friendly fire incident had happened. With no new orders, Crace decided to relocate his ships during the night to a point 220 nautical miles (410 km; 250 mi) from Port Moresby, to better intercept a Japanese invasion force if it came through either the Jomard Passage or the China Strait. Instructions from the American commander of the operation were still not forthcoming, and Crace was forced to rely on intercepted radio messages to track the progress of the main battle. The task force remained in their assigned area until 01:00 on 10 May, when Crace ordered them to withdraw south to Cid Harbour on Whitsunday Island; the lack of reports and intelligence concerning either the Americans or Japanese led him to conclude that both forces had withdrawn, and there was no immediate threat to Port Moresby.

The Task Force was temporarily redesignated Task Group 17.3 (of the U.S. aircraft carrier task force Task Force 17) during the battle.

The task force later, under Crutchley, assisted with the initial stages of the Guadalcanal Campaign along with escorting Allied convoys around the northeast Australia, New Guinea, and Coral Sea areas. In August 1942, the force participated in the Battle of Savo Island. The next month, the unit served with the U.S. Navy's Task Force 18, centered on the aircraft carrier USS Wasp.

=== 1943 ===
When the Operation Pamphlet convoy sailed from Fremantle on 20 February 1943 it was escorted by the Australian light cruiser HMAS Adelaide, as well as the Dutch cruiser Jacob van Heemskerck and destroyer Tjerk Hiddes. It met the ships of Task Group 44.3, a component of Task Force 44, on 24 February in the Great Australian Bight. This force comprised Australia and American destroyers Bagley, Helm and Henley, and had been dispatched from Sydney on 17 February to escort the troopships. Adelaide and the Dutch warships left the convoy shortly afterwards to escort Nieuw Amsterdam into Melbourne; the liner docked there on the afternoon of 25 February. Task Group 44.3 escorted the remaining ships to Sydney, passing south of Tasmania. The escort was strengthened by Jacob van Heemskerck and the French destroyer Le Triomphant en route. The three liners arrived at Sydney on 27 February 1943, completing Operation Pamphlet without loss. Despite the official secrecy concerning the convoy, large crowds assembled on vantage points around Sydney Harbour to watch the ships arrive. Queen Mary anchored off Bradleys Head and the other two liners berthed at Woolloomooloo. Curtin officially announced that the 9th Division had returned to Australia in a speech to the House of Representatives on 23 March.

On 15 March 1943 the organization was redesignated as Task Force 74 under the United States Seventh Fleet.

=== 1944 ===
In mid-1944, Commodore John Augustine Collins was made commander of the Australian-U.S. Navy Task Force 74, and commander of the Australian Naval Squadron, with the heavy cruiser HMAS Australia as his flagship. He became the first graduate of the RAN College to command a naval squadron in action, during the bombardment of Noemfoor, on 2 July 1944.

Commodore Collins was badly wounded in an attack which may have been the first kamikaze strike, which hit Australia on 21 October 1944, in the lead up to the Battle of Leyte Gulf. He did not resume his command until July 1945. When the war ended Collins was the RAN's representative at the surrender ceremony in Tokyo Bay.

== Ships of the task force ==
- Heavy cruisers: USS Chicago, HMAS Australia, HMAS Canberra
- Light cruiser: HMAS Hobart
- Destroyers: USS Perkins, USS Whipple, USS Farragut (from 7 May 1942), USS Walke (from 7 May), USS Henley (from 14 May), USS Helm (from 19 May), USS Selfridge (from 21 May), USS Patterson (from ???)
