= CA-33 =

CA-33 may refer to:

- California's 33rd congressional district
- California State Route 33
- USS Portland (CA-33), a World War II heavy cruiser
