= Herbert F. Leary =

American Vice admiral

Herbert Fairfax Leary
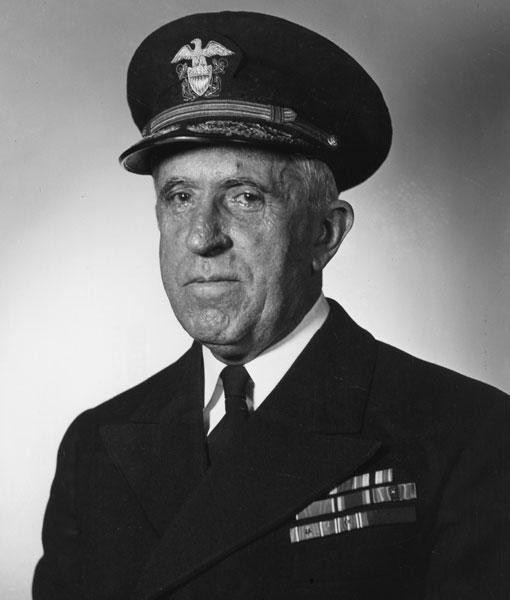
- Born: May 31, 1885; Washington, D.C., US
- Died: December 3, 1957 (aged 72); Newport, Rhode Island, US
- Burial place: United States Naval Academy Cemetery
- Relatives: Rear Admiral Richard P. Leary (father)
- Military career
- Allegiance: United States
- Branch: United States Navy
- Service years: 1905–1946
- Rank: Vice admiral
- Commands: Sixteenth Fleet; Eastern Sea Frontier; Fifth Naval District; Battleships, Pacific; ANZAC Command; Cruisers, Battle Force; USS Portland; USS Corsair; USS Harvard; USS Preston; USS Lamson
- Conflicts: Occupation of Cuba; World War I World War II: Attack on Pearl Harbor; New Guinea campaign
- Awards: Navy Cross; Silver Star; Legion of Merit (2)

Herbert Fairfax Leary (May 31, 1885 – December 3, 1957) was a highly decorated officer in the United States Navy with the rank of vice admiral. A son of Rear Admiral Richard P. Leary, he distinguished himself during World War I while on the staff of commander, U.S. Naval Forces in Europe under Admiral William Sims and received the Navy Cross, the United States Navy's second-highest decoration awarded for valor in combat.

Leary remained in the Navy following the war and held many important assignments, including command of cruiser USS Portland and later as Director of Fleet Training Division. Following the United States' entry into World War II, he already held a flag rank and commanded the ANZAC Force based in Australia. Due to disputes with General Douglas MacArthur, Leary was ordered back to the United States and served as commander, Eastern Sea Frontier in New York City until the end of the war.

Although he retired from the Navy in early 1946, Leary remained active and served as president of the New York Maritime Academy from 1946 to 1951 during the period of the academy's transformation into the New York State Maritime College.

== Early career ==
Herbert F. Leary was born on May 31, 1885, in Washington, D.C., the son of Rear Admiral Richard P. Leary and his wife Mary. He attended public schools in Washington, D.C., and later studied at the École cantonale d'art de Lausanne, Switzerland, before received an appointment to the United States Naval Academy at Annapolis, Maryland, in May 1901. His father died in December that year, just seven months after young Herbert entered the academy.

While at the academy, he was active in fencing and baseball teams and reached the rank of cadet lieutenant. Among his classmates were several future World War II admirals including: Harold G. Bowen Sr., Arthur B. Cook, Wilhelm L. Friedell, William R. Furlong, Stanford C. Hooper, Royal E. Ingersoll, Byron McCandless, John H. Newton, Chester W. Nimitz, Harry E. Shoemaker, John M. Smeallie, John W. Wilcox Jr. and Walter B. Woodson.

Leary graduated with distinction on January 31, 1905, with Bachelor of Science and joined the battleship USS Kentucky, then stationed at Guantánamo Bay, Cuba as Passed Midshipman. In August that year, he was one of the young officers detailed to duty at Portsmouth Navy Yard, New Hampshire, during the Russo-Japanese Peace Conference. Leary subsequently rejoined the Kentucky and participated in the naval operations with the North Atlantic Squadron.

He was transferred to the battleship USS Virginia in June 1906 and participated in the naval operations off the coast of Cuba during the U.S. Second Occupation in September that year. While aboard Virginia, Leary was promoted to ensign on February 2, 1907, and appointed aide to the Commander Second Division, First Squadron, Atlantic Fleet, Rear Admiral Charles H. Davis.

In November 1907, Leary was transferred to the battleship USS Minnesota and assumed duty as Watch and Division Officer and commander of 12-inch turret gun. While aboard the Minnesota, he took part in the cruise around the world with the Battle Fleet and following return to the United States, he participated in the fleet exercise at Magdalena Bay and his turret made the record score for that type of gun.

Leary was ordered to Washington, D.C., in March 1909 and entered the postgraduate instruction in ordnance at the Bureau of Ordnance, Navy Department and then at Naval Proving Ground, Indian Head, Maryland. He was promoted to lieutenant on January 31, 1910, and completed the instruction in April in that year, when he joined newly commissioned battleship USS North Dakota.

In July 1910, Leary was ordered to Bath Iron Works at Bath, Maine, where the destroyer USS Trippe was under construction. The Trippe was commissioned in March 1911 and participated in the trials at Virginia Capes. Leary was appointed commanding officer of the destroyer USS Lamson in early 1912 and transferred to command of destroyer USS Preston in May that year.

Leary remained in command of Preston until December 1912, when he was transferred to the Bureau of Ordnance under Rear Admiral Joseph Strauss for duty as a member of the Joint Army and Navy Board on Gun Forgings. He spent three years in that capacity and joined the battleship USS Florida in September 1915. Leary served as gunnery officer under Captain Hilary P. Jones. While in this capacity, he was promoted to lieutenant commander on August 29, 1916.

== World War I ==
Following the United States entry into World War I, Leary was detached from Florida in June 1917 and embarked for France. Upon his arrival to Paris, he was appointed liaison officer with the French Fleet aboard French battleship Bretagne and remained there until September that year, when he was ordered to the staff of commander, U.S. Naval Forces in Europe under Admiral William Sims. Leary was then appointed liaison officer on the staff of British Commander-in-Chief, Grand Fleet under Admiral David Beatty. He took part in the cruise aboard cruiser HMS Furious in the North Sea and returned to the United States in October 1917.

Leary was attached to the staff of commander, Battle Force, ONE, Atlantic Fleet and served as force gunnery officer with additional duty as a member of the board to consider the use of gas in naval warfare. While in this capacity, he was promoted to commander on February 1, 1918. Leary was appointed gunnery officer on the staff of Battleship Division Nine under Rear Admiral Hugh Rodman, operating in European waters with the British Grand Fleet.

For his World War I service, Leary was decorated with the Navy Cross, the United States military's second-highest decoration awarded for valor in combat. He also received the Legion of Honour in the Grade of Chevalier by the Government of France.

== Interwar period ==
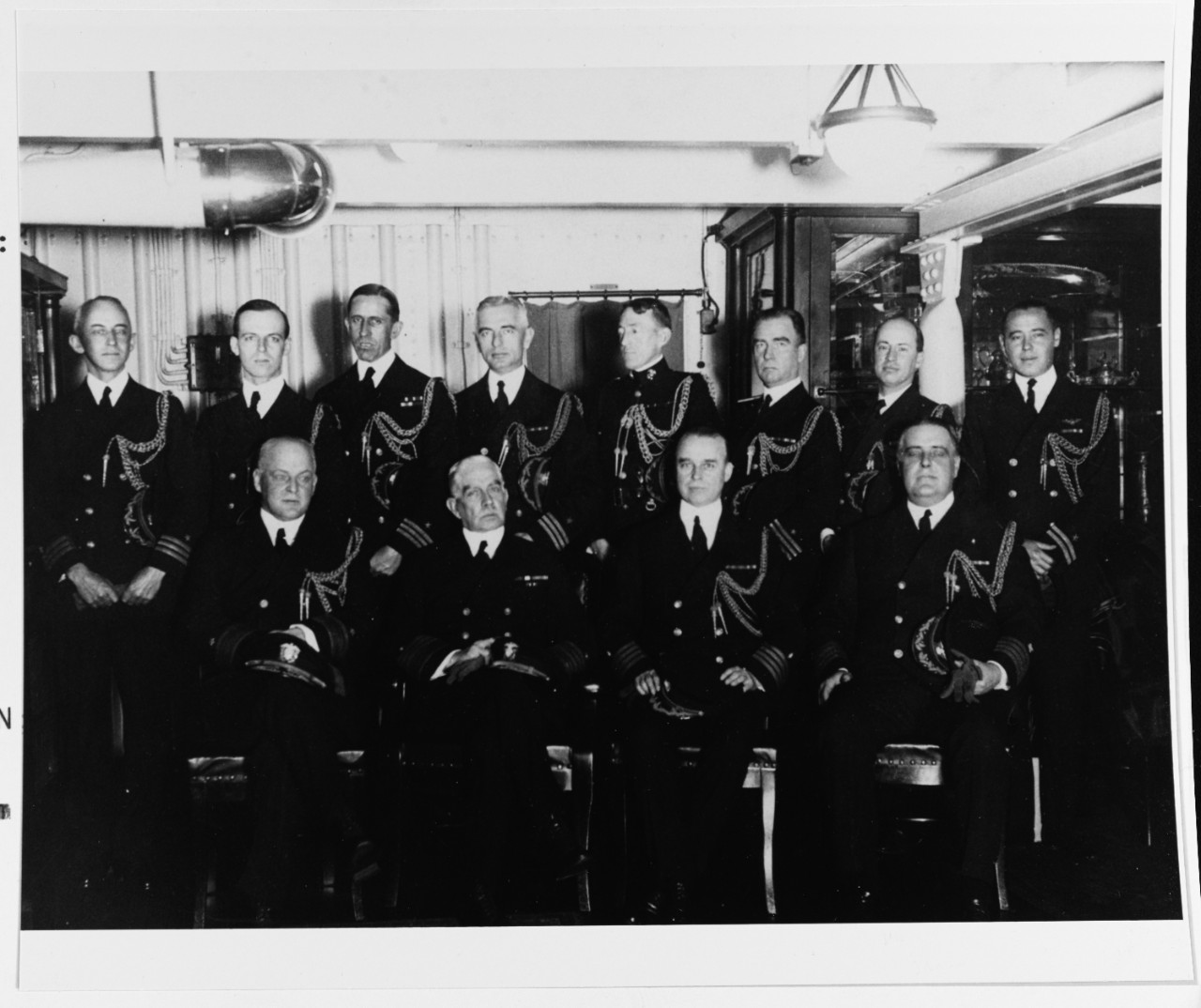
Leary (second row, third from left) as Gunnery officer on the staff of United States Fleet under Admiral Hilary P. Jones (front row, second from left) in early 1923.

Following the Armistice, Leary was appointed a member of a special technical board to report upon the condition of the surrender of German submarines at Harwich, Scotland. Later he had duty with the Inter-Allied Armistice Commission that inspected the German Navy Yard and air stations. For his service with the commission, Leary received a Letter of Commendation from the British Admiralty.

In January 1919, he successively commanded steam yachts USS Harvard and USS Corsair, operating in German waters, and returned to the United States shortly thereafter. Following his return stateside, Leary was appointed Squadron Gunnery Officer on the staff of Commander Squadron Three, Atlantic Fleet.

Leary was transferred to the Bureau of Ordnance in Washington, D.C., where Chief of the Bureau, Rear Admiral Ralph Earle, appointed him aide to Vice Admiral Charbonnier, Inspector General of Ordnance in the French Navy, who was also head of the French Naval Ordnance Mission. Leary accompanied him on visits to all ordnance establishments, civilian, Army and Navy, in the United States.

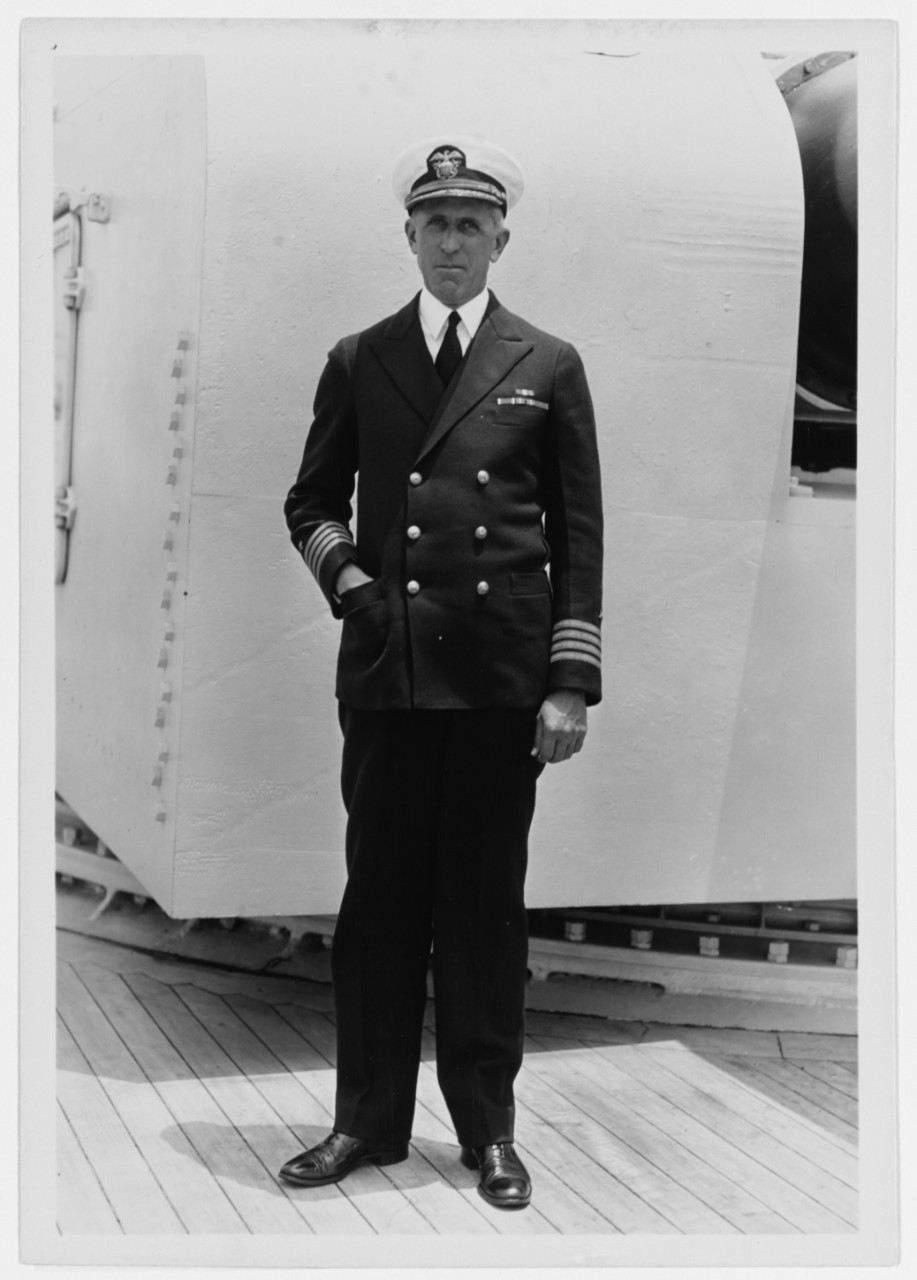
Leary as commanding officer of cruiser USS Portland in early 1933.

In May 1922, Leary was detached from the Bureau of Ordnance and attached to the recently commissioned battleship USS Maryland, where he assumed duty as fleet gunnery officer on the staff of United States Fleet under his old superior, now Admiral Hilary P. Jones. Leary served in this capacity until June 1923, when he was appointed executive officer of the battleship USS New York. While aboard New York, he participated in the patrol cruises with the United States Pacific Fleet until May 1924, when he was ordered to London, England, for duty as Assistant Naval Attaché with additional duty in Paris, Rome, Berlin and the Hague. While in this capacity, Leary served as technical advisor with the American delegation at the conference on the control of trade in arms, munitions and implements of war at the League of Nations in Geneva, Switzerland, in April 1925.

He returned to the United States in June 1926 and joined the staff of Commander Destroyer Squadrons, Battle Fleet and served as aide to Rear Admiral Frank H. Schofield until October 1928. While in this capacity, Leary was promoted to captain on June 2, 1927.

Leary subsequently served as naval inspector of ordnance at the Naval Proving Ground Dahlgren, Virginia, and Naval Powder Factory, Indian Head, Maryland, and entered the Senior Course at the Naval War College in Newport, Rhode Island, in May 1931. He graduated one year later and was ordered to the Quincy Shipyard, Massachusetts, for duty in connection with fitting out of new heavy cruiser USS Portland.

The Portland was commissioned by the end of February 1933 and Leary served as her commanding officer during the first cruise along the east coast of the United States. In April that year, Portland was tasked with the coordination of search and rescue efforts following the crash of airship Akron. Leary served in that capacity until June 1934, when he was appointed Chief of Staff, Commander, Destroyers, Battle Force under Rear Admiral Edward C. Kalbfus. He served until March 1935, when he was ordered to Washington, D.C., for duty in the Division of Fleet Training within the Office of the Naval Operations.

Leary served as deputy director to Rear Admiral Manley H. Simons until June 1936, when he succeeded him as Director of that Division and was responsible for the coordination of Fleet training activities until the end of March 1937, when he assumed duty as chief of staff and aide to commander, Battle Force under Vice Admiral Claude C. Bloch. Following the promotion of Bloch to the capacity of Commander-in-Chief, United States Fleet, Leary accompanied him to the new command.

Upon promotion to the rank of rear admiral on June 1, 1938, Leary returned to Washington and assumed duty as director of fleet training, the position he held two years previously. While in this capacity, he was responsible for the preparation of a balanced program of fleet training based upon approved war plans and preparation of general instructions for the conduct of fleet exercises. Leary served in that capacity until February 1941, when he assumed command of Cruisers, Battle Force with additional duty as commander, Cruiser Divisions 9.

== World War II ==
=== Southwest Pacific ===
At the time of the Japanese attack on Pearl Harbor, Hawaii on December 7, 1941, Leary's staff was located aboard light cruiser USS Honolulu, but Leary himself was present at the Halekulani Hotel in Honolulu together with admirals Walter S. Anderson and Robert A. Theobald. Leary had six cruisers under his command, all anchored at Ford Island, where they suffered only minor damage.

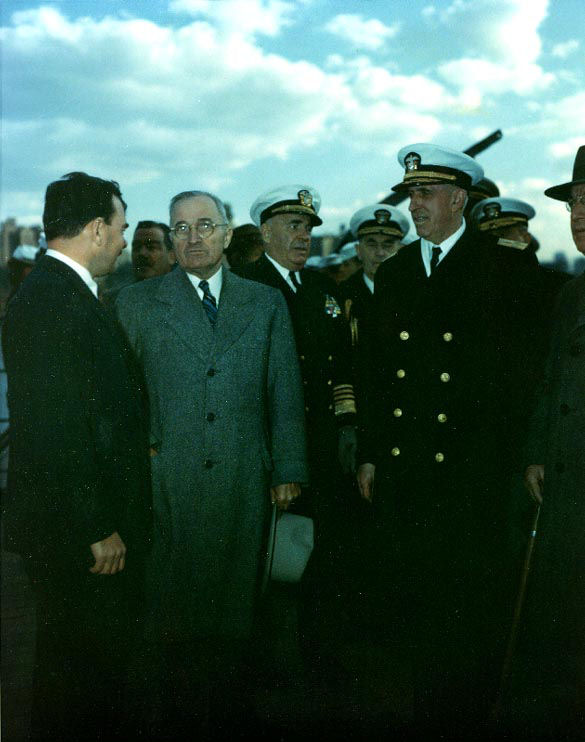
Herbert Leary (right) with President Harry S. Truman aboard the battleship USS Missouri at the New York Fleet Review on 27 October 1945.

Leary was promoted to the temporary rank of vice admiral on February 27, 1942, and assumed duty as commander, ANZAC Command, which was established for defense of the northeast approaches to Australia including the Fiji Islands, New Hebrides, and New Caledonia on the request of the Australian government following the fall of Singapore and Rabaul.

He established his headquarters in Melbourne and his ships participated in the early stages of the New Guinea campaign. The ANZAC command was absorbed by South West Pacific Area under General Douglas MacArthur on April 22, 1942, and Leary was appointed commander, Southwest Pacific Force. However his tenure was short-lived due to a complicated relationship with General MacArthur. Leary reported directly to the Chief of Naval Operations, Admiral Ernest J. King, in Washington, D.C., and then to General MacArthur, who subsequently replaced Leary with Rear Admiral Arthur S. Carpender by the end of September 1942. For his service in Southwest Pacific area, Leary was decorated with the Silver Star and also was made Honorary Commander of the Order of the British Empire.

Leary was subsequently ordered to Hawaii, where he assumed duty as Commander, Battleships, Pacific. While in this capacity, his main responsibility was the training of the battleship crews, maintenance of the ships and to provide combat ready naval forces to the operational commanders within the Pacific Fleet. He also assisted in the establishment of the naval base on Fiji. Leary was succeeded by Vice Admiral Willis A. Lee on April 16, 1943, and ordered back to the United States. For his service in that capacity, Leary received the Legion of Merit.

=== Later service ===
Following his return stateside, Leary reverted to his permanent rank of rear admiral and assumed duty as commandant, Fifth Naval District with headquarters at Norfolk Navy Yard, Virginia. While in this capacity, he was responsible for the naval installations and defense of Virginia, West Virginia, Maryland, and North Carolina. However, his tenure was short-lived and Leary was promoted again to vice admiral on November 1, 1943, and assumed duty as commander, Eastern Sea Frontier. He was now responsible for providing escorts for convoys within his frontier; the frontier was responsible for sea-air rescue, harbor defense, shipping lane patrol, minesweeping, and air operations.

At the end of the war, Leary accepted surrender of two German U-boats and also held additional duty as commander-in-chief, Sixteenth Fleet, an inactive reserve of 1,000 combatant ships. Leary retired from the Navy on June 1, 1946, after 41 years on active duty and received his second Legion of Merit for his service at Norfolk.

== Postwar life and death ==
Upon the retirement from the Navy, Leary was ordered to Fort Schuyler, New York City, where he succeeded Vice Admiral Thomas T. Craven as president of the New York Maritime Academy. During his presidency, the New York Marine Academy's three-year course was expanded into a four-year degree-granting maritime college. The name of the academy was changed to the New York State Maritime College in 1949 and Leary was involved in the obtaining of a new suitable training ship, former attack cargo ship of the U.S. Navy, USS Hydrus.

Leary resigned as president of the New York State Maritime College on June 1, 1951, upon reaching the age 66 and settled in Jamestown, Rhode Island, where he was active in golf and tennis and the Episcopal Church. He was also a member of the Chevy Chase Country Club, New York Yacht Club and Military Order of the Loyal Legion of the United States. Vice Admiral Herbert F. Leary died following a long illness on December 3, 1957, aged 72, in Naval Hospital in Newport, Rhode Island.

He was buried with full military honors at United States Naval Academy Cemetery in Annapolis, Maryland. Leary was married to Marion Barnes and they had two sons: Herbert Fairfax Jr. and Neville Carlyle.

== Decorations ==
Vice admiral Leary's ribbon bar:

1st Row	Navy Cross		Silver Star
2nd Row	Legion of Merit with one 5/16" Gold Star	Cuban Pacification Medal	World War I Victory Medal with Overseas Clasp
3rd Row	American Defense Service Medal with Fleet Clasp	Asiatic–Pacific Campaign Medal with two 3/16 inch service stars	American Campaign Medal
4th Row	World War II Victory Medal	Honorary Commander of the Order of the British Empire (Great Britain)	Chevalier of the Legion of Honour (France)

Military offices
Preceded by Thomas T. Craven	President of the New York State Maritime College; June 1, 1946 – June 1, 1951	Succeeded by Calvin T. Durgin
Preceded by Adolphus Andrews	Commander, Eastern Sea Frontier; November 1, 1943 – January 16, 1946	Succeeded by Thomas C. Kinkaid
Preceded by Manley H. Simons	Commandant, Fifth Naval District; June 1, 1943 – November 1, 1943	Succeeded by David M. LeBreton
Preceded by Walter S. Anderson	Commander, Battleships, Pacific; September 28, 1942 – April 16, 1943	Succeeded by Willis Augustus Lee
