= Task Force 17 =

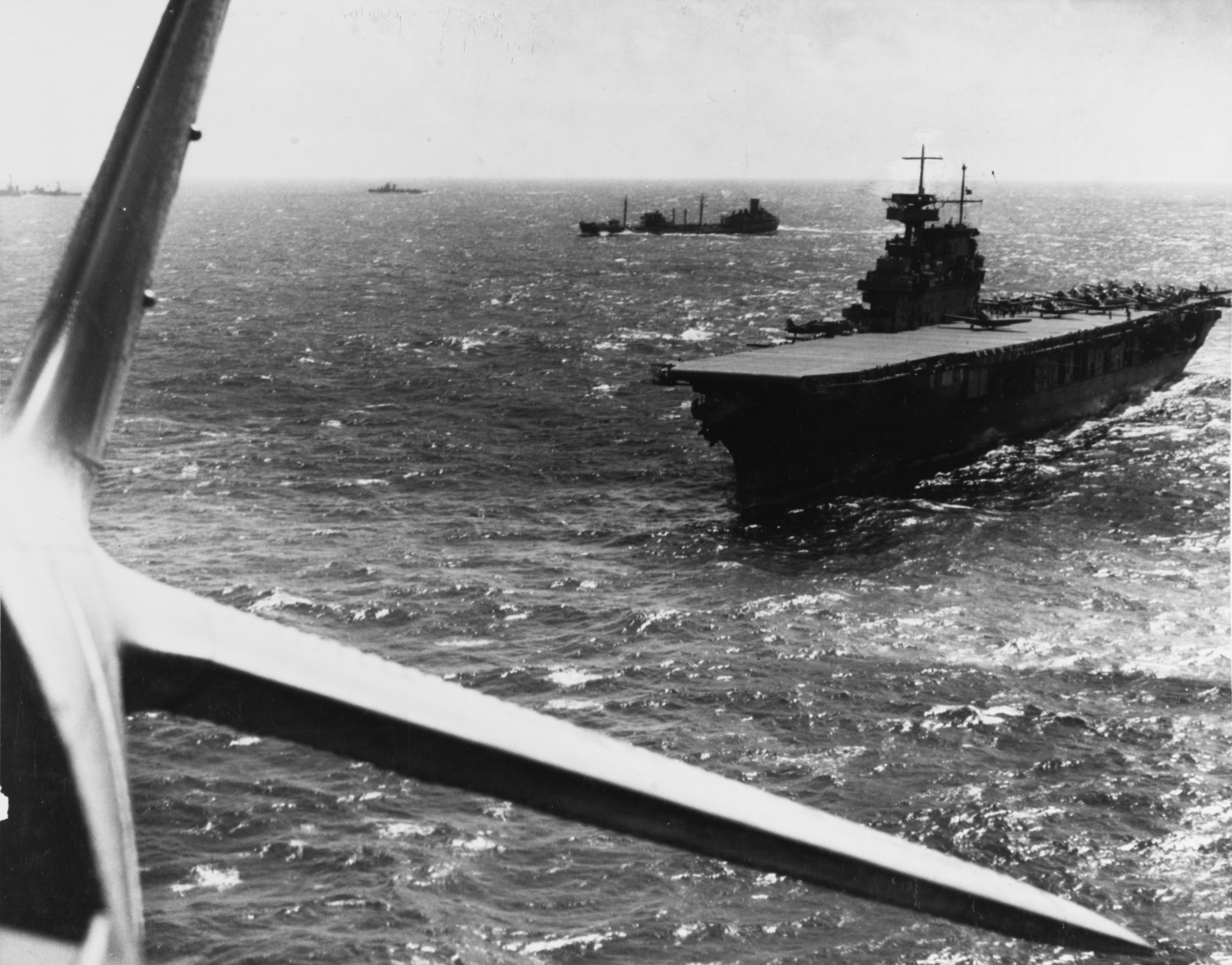
- Yorktown and Task Force 17 operate in the Pacific Ocean in February or March 1942.
- Active: 1941–1942 ?
- Country: United States
- Branch: United States Navy
- Role: Seizing and maintaining Command of the sea, Carrier Strike Group
- Size: USS Lexington and Yorktown Carrier Strike Group
- Part of: United States Pacific Fleet
- Garrison/HQ: Pearl Harbor, Hawaii
- Engagements: Marshalls-Gilberts raids Invasion of Lae-Salamaua; Battle of the Coral Sea; Battle of Midway; Battle of the Santa Cruz Islands

Commanders
- Notable commanders: Frank Jack Fletcher

The designation Task Force 17 (TF17) was applied to a number of US Navy units during World War II. Its most famous incarnation was as an Carrier Strike Group of the United States Navy during the Pacific Campaign of World War II. This TF17 participated in several major carrier battles in the first year of the war. Later, after the March 1943 subdivision of the Pacific Fleet into multiple numbered fleets, a new TF17 was formed as the submarine element/submarine type command of the First Fleet, an overarching, largely administrative command under the direct control of Admiral Chester Nimitz. It continued in this role until the end of the war.

TF17 was initially centered around USS Yorktown. With Yorktown, TF17 engaged Imperial Japanese Navy forces in actions at the Marshalls-Gilberts raids, Invasion of Lae-Salamaua, Battle of the Coral Sea, and the Battle of Midway. Yorktown was sunk at Midway.

Reformed around USS Hornet and commanded by RADM George Murray, TF17 supported Allied forces during the Guadalcanal campaign. At the Battle of the Santa Cruz Islands, Hornet was sunk. After the battle the task force ceased to exist, the remaining ships (the cruiser and destroyer escorts) were then dispersed to other duties.

== Operational history ==
=== Battle of the Coral Sea ===
In late April 1942, Admiral Chester Nimitz ordered for Rear Admiral Aubrey Fitch, commander of Task Force 11 (TF11) centered on USS Lexington, to travel to the Coral Sea to join Fletcher's Task Force 17. An additional cruise force, Task Force 44, was deployed from the south.

The rendezvous took place on 1 May, but Fitch advised Fletcher that he "did not expect to complete fueling till noon on 4 May." Fletcher moved TF17 further to the northwest. RADM Fitch was advised by RADM Fletcher of a second rendezvous, scheduled for 4 May and would have the Australian cruisers HMAS Australia and HMAS Hobart join with TF44.

As the American Task Forces were refueling, attempting to move to favorable positions in order to intercept incoming Japanese forces, Japan launched the Invasion of Tulagi, part of Operation Mo. Upon receiving notice regarding the Japanese invasion of Tulagi, RADM Fletcher ordered TF17 to head there, hoping for arrival on the morning of 4 May.

By 06:30, 4 May, Yorktown made the first of three strikes at around 08:15, assaulting Japanese shipping in the harbor. After completing the strikes, Fletcher moved south to rendezvous with Fitch and RADM John Gregory Crace or TF44.

Lexington was lost during the battle while Yorktown was hit by a bomb. The hit reduced Yorktown's speed to 24 knots. By 12:30 TF17, with the remainder of Lexington's aircraft on Yorktown, were forced to return to Pearl Harbor. For the Japanese aircraft carriers, Shokaku had been severely damaged and returned to Truk. The second carrier, Zuikaku, also left, as it was low on aircraft, fuel, and personnel. As a result, Admiral Inouye ordered for the Moresby invasion to be postponed and for the ships to retire.

Fletcher and TF17 returned to Pearl Harbor where Yorktown went into dry-dock. The damage that the ship had received during the battle was estimated to require at least two weeks of repairs; however, working around the clock, the damage was patched sufficiently to allow Yorktown to return to sea in 48 hours.

=== Battle of Midway ===
TF17, under the command of Rear Admiral Frank Jack Fletcher, was to depart from Pearl Harbor, and did so on 30 May, to join Task Force 16 (TF16), centered around USS Enterprise (CV-6) and USS Hornet (CV-8), northeast of Midway Island. TF16 and TF17 joined about 350 miles northeast of Midway on 2 June, when Fletcher became officer in tactical command. The three aircraft carriers, supported by cruiser-launched floatplanes, provided 234 aircraft.

Yorktown was lost during the battle; damaged by aircraft (bombs and torpedoes) from Japanese aircraft carrier Hiryū 4 June 1942, torpedoed by Japanese submarine I-168 on 6 June 1942, and capsized and sank on 7 June 1942.
