= Battle for Australia =

Historiographical term to describe battles that took place near Australia during WWII

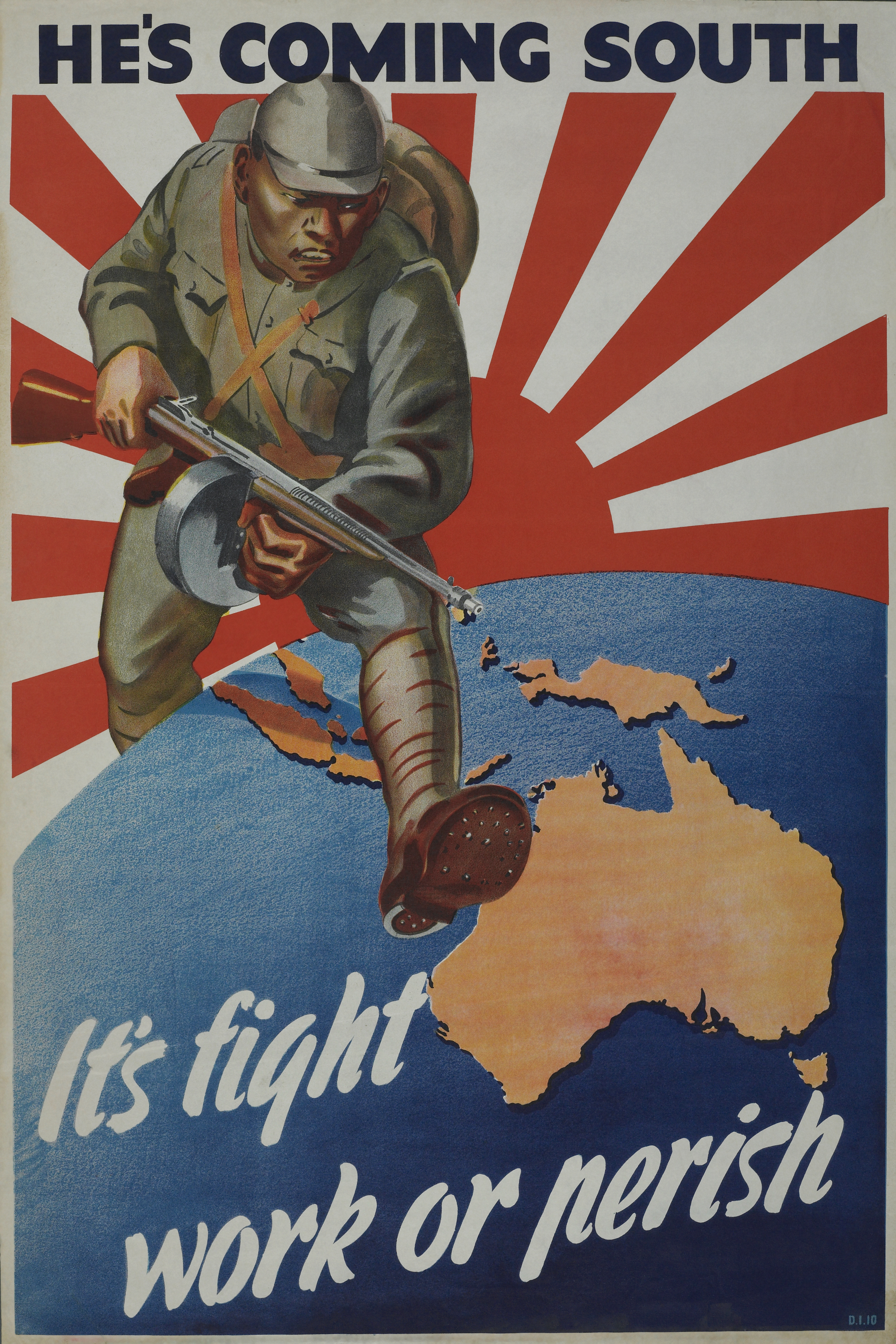
An Australian propaganda poster released in 1942. The poster was criticised for being alarmist when it was released and was banned by the Queensland Government

The Battle for Australia is a contested historiographical term used to claim a coordinated link between a series of battles near Australia during the Pacific War of the Second World War alleged to be in preparation for a Japanese invasion of the continent.

== Definition ==
After the fall of Singapore in 1942, Prime Minister of Australia John Curtin compared its loss to the Battle of Dunkirk. The Battle of Britain occurred after Dunkirk; "the fall of Singapore opens the Battle for Australia", Curtin said, which threatened the Commonwealth, the United States, and the entire English-speaking world. While Japan did not plan to invade Australia and in February 1942 could not successfully do so, the Australian government and people expected an invasion soon. The fear was greatest until June 1942. Curtin said on 16 February:

The protection of this country is no longer that of a contribution to a world at war but the resistance to an enemy threatening to invade our own shore ... It is now work or fight as we have never worked or fought before ... On what we do now depends everything we may like to do when this bloody test has been survived.

== Historiography and commemoration ==
The Returned and Services League of Australia (RSL) and the Battle for Australia Commemoration National Council campaigned for over a decade for official commemoration of a series of battles fought in 1942, including the Battle of the Coral Sea, Battle of Milne Bay and Kokoda Track campaign, as having formed a "battle for Australia". This campaign met with success, and in 2008 the Australian Government proclaimed that commemorations for the Battle for Australia would take place annually on the first Wednesday in September, with the day being designated "Battle for Australia Day". This day recognises "the service and sacrifice of all those who served in defense of Australia in 1942 and 1943". The day is not a public holiday.

Peter Stanley, the former principal historian at the Australian War Memorial, argues that the concept of a 'Battle for Australia' is mistaken as these actions did not form a single campaign aimed against Australia. Stanley has also stated that no historian he knows believes that there was a 'Battle for Australia'. In a 2006 speech, Stanley argued that the concept of a Battle for Australia is invalid as the events that are considered to form the battle were only loosely related. Stanley argued, "The Battle for Australia movement arises directly out of a desire to find meaning in the terrible losses of 1942" and that "there was no 'Battle for Australia', as such", as the Japanese did not launch a coordinated campaign directed against Australia. Furthermore, Stanley stated that while the phrase "Battle for Australia" was used in wartime propaganda, it was not applied to the events of 1942 until the 1990s and that countries other than Australia do not recognise the "battle" as being part of the Second World War.

== See also ==
- Military history of Australia during World War II
- Operation FS
- Proposed Japanese invasion of Australia during World War II
