= John Gregory Crace =

Australian Royal Navy officer

Admiral Sir John Gregory Crace KBE CB
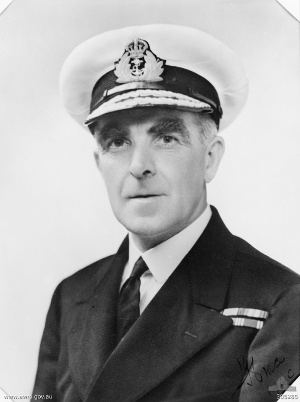
- Rear Admiral John Crace c. 1940
- Born: 6 February 1887; Gungahlin, New South Wales, Australia
- Died: 11 May 1968 (aged 81); Hampshire, England
- Military career
- Allegiance: United Kingdom
- Branch: Royal Navy
- Service years: 1902–1946
- Rank: Admiral
- Commands: Chatham Dockyard (1942–46); Task Force 44 (1942); HM Australian Fleet (1939–42); HMS Emerald (1934–37); HMS Osprey (1924–25, 1930–32); HMS Valhalla (1929–30)
- Conflicts: First World War; Second World War; Battle of the Coral Sea
- Awards: Knight Commander of the Order of the British Empire; Companion of the Order of the Bath

Admiral Sir John Gregory Crace, KBE, CB (6 February 1887 – 11 May 1968) was an Australian who came to prominence as an officer of the Royal Navy (RN). He commanded the Australian-United States Support Force, Task Force 44, at the Battle of the Coral Sea in 1942.

== Early life ==
Crace was born to Kate Marion Crace and Edward Kendall Crace at Gungahlin, New South Wales (now part of the Australian Capital Territory). He was educated at The Kings School in Parramatta, before completing school in the UK in October 1899.

== Naval career ==
Crace joined the Royal Navy as a cadet, aboard HMS Britannia, in May 1902. After being trained as a torpedo officer, Crace served in the battlecruiser HMAS Australia through much of the First World War.

He travelled back and forth to Australia during the interwar years, and served in a series of sea and shore positions before being assigned command of the Australian Squadron in September 1939. Upon his arrival in Sydney, Crace grew increasingly dismayed at the state of the RAN fleet and attempted to resign. However, after war with Japan broke out, Crace was appointed commander of the Allied Naval Squadron, ANZAC Force.

During the Battle of the Coral Sea, Crace narrowly escaped a Japanese air raid while patrolling south of New Guinea. He returned to Britain in June 1942 as a vice admiral, commanding the Chatham Dockyard. Crace was placed on the retired list in 1945, but remained in command at Chatham until July 1946.

Crace was appointed a Companion of the Order of the Bath in 1941, promoted to admiral in 1945, and knighted as a Knight Commander of the Order of the British Empire in 1947.

Sir John Crace died in Hampshire, England in 1968. The suburb of Crace, Australian Capital Territory is named after Crace's father, Edward Kendall Crace.

Military offices
Preceded by Commodore Wilfrid Patterson	Rear Admiral Commanding HM Australian Squadron; 1939–1942	Succeeded by Rear Admiral Victor Crutchley
