= Gilbert C. Hoover =

United States naval officer from 1916 to 1947

Rear Admiral Gilbert C. Hoover
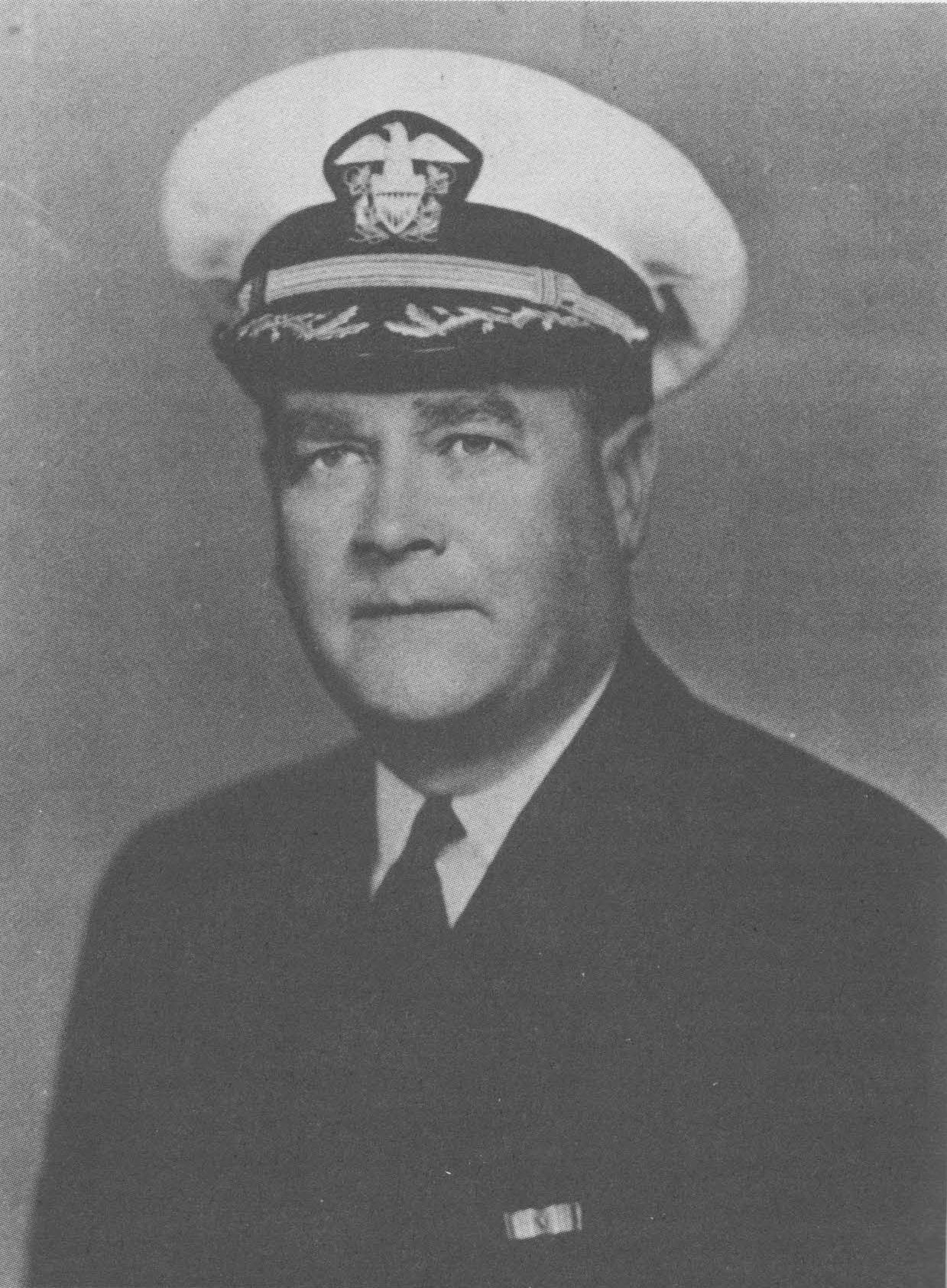
- Born: Gilbert Corwin Hoover; July 25, 1894; Columbus, Ohio, U.S.
- Died: January 8, 1980 (aged 85); East Providence, Rhode Island, U.S.
- Burial place: Bristol, RI
- Spouse(s): Martha Smith, Mabel Dumbell
- Children: Gilbert Jr., Katherine, Ann
- Military career
- Allegiance: United States of America
- Branch: United States Navy
- Years of Service: 1916–1947; 1951–1956
- Rank: Rear Admiral
- Nickname: "Gil"
- Commands: USS Helena (CL-50), Destroyer Division 25
- Conflicts: World War I World War II • Battle of Coral Sea • Battle of Midway • Guadalcanal Campaign

Gilbert Corwin Hoover (July 25, 1894 – January 8, 1980) was a United States Naval officer from 1916 to 1947. He served in both world wars, was involved in the early stages of the development of the Atomic Bomb, and managed the Atomic Energy Commission's Boulder facility as a civilian contractor. He was awarded the Navy Cross three times.

== Early life ==
Hoover was born on July 25, 1894, in Columbus, Ohio to Fredrick Maynard Hoover (1868–1930) and Eliza Florence Kinnear Hoover (1876–1955). His parents came from prominent families, and had ancestors from Kingston upon Hull in the United Kingdom. Due to his love of the ocean Hoover attended the United States Naval Academy and graduated in the Class of 1916.

== Military service ==
=== World War I ===
After graduation Hoover was assigned to the battleship USS Wyoming (BB-32), which was undergoing dockyard work in New York, around March, 1916. Wyoming returned to service on June 26 and was involved in maneuvers off the Virginia Capes for the remainder of the year.

Hoover was promoted to Lieutenant (junior grade) on January 1, 1917 — eight days before Wyoming left New York for Cuban waters. She left Cuba on March 27 and was cruising off Yorktown, Virginia when the US declared war on Germany. Wyoming left the Chesapeake Bay area on November 25 for Scapa Flow. She arrived on December 7, joining the 6th Battle Squadron (United Kingdom).

Hoover was promoted to Lieutenant on January 2, 1918. After months of drilling, Wyoming escorted a convoy to Stavanger, Norway, patrolled the North Sea, and covered a minelaying operation. During this time there were multiple false reports of U-boat sightings. Wyoming became Rear Admiral Hugh Rodman's flagship after USS New York (BB-34) was damaged hitting a U-boat. On November 21 Wyoming and 370 other warships rendezvoused with the German High Seas Fleet and accepted its surrender. Afterwards she joined the SS George Washington, which was carrying president Woodrow Wilson to the Paris Peace Conference, along with nine other battleships and 28 destroyers off Brest, France. Wyoming then returned to Britain, sailing on to New York on December 25. In a roster from December 26, Hoover is listed as having been in European waters for 12 months.

=== Interwar ===
On October 1, 1939 Hoover, by then a Commander, was assigned to the "Experimental Section" under the Bureau of Ordnance, headed by Rear Admiral William R. Furlong.

=== World War II ===
On October 1, 1941 Hoover's signal number was 632. He was commander of Destroyer Division 25, part of Destroyer Squadron 13 led by Captain L.H. Thebaud and Lt.Cmdr. H.C. Robinson. Division 25 included USS Woolsey (DD-437) (flagship), USS Ludlow (DD-438), USS Edison (DD-439), and USS Bristol (DD-453). Squadron 13 was part of Flotilla 3, which in October was part of Task Force Four of the Atlantic Fleet.

After the attack on Pearl Harbor Hoover was transferred to the Pacific as a destroyer division commander in Task Force 17.5, responsible for guarding the carriers USS Yorktown (CV-5) and USS Lexington (CV-2). The ships under his command were: USS Morris (DD-417); USS Anderson (DD-411); USS Hammann (DD-412); USS Hughes (DD-410); and USS Russell (DD-414). Hoover was involved in the Battle of the Coral Sea where he was awarded a Navy Cross for moving his ships alongside the USS Lexington to rescue survivors. His command became Task Group 17.4, including USS Gwin (DD-433) in addition to 17.5, a destroyer screen for Yorktown during the decisive Battle of Midway in early June. Hammann and Yorktown were the only American ships to be sunk during the battle.

Captain Hoover took command of the Brooklyn-class light cruiser USS Helena (CL-50) on September 25, 1942. Under command of Hoover Helena took part in the battles of Cape Esperance and Guadalcanal.

As a result of the night action off Guadalcanal (12-13 November 1942) only six of the thirteen U.S. Navy ships involved were able to steam away under their own power. The six included Helena. By dawn, these survivors had been gathered together by the senior surviving officer, Captain Hoover, in the southeast end of Indispensable Strait. In Captain Hoover's preliminary action report to Vice Admiral William F. Halsey, Commander, South Pacific, Hoover stated that he was concerned that radio emissions might disclose the location of the ships, so he sent the report over to the USS O'Bannon and ordered her north of San Cristobal Island to transmit it by radio. Captain Hoover then turned the five ships south of San Cristobal and, in a loose formation, headed for Espiritu Santo. In the southeast end of Indispensable Strait the USS Juneau was torpedoed by the Japanese submarine I-26. Having received reports that three more Japanese submarines lurked along his route and with a submarine present in his area Hoover made the decision to not search for survivors of the USS Juneau, thereby abandoning 100 survivors, of which only ten survived. Hoover was left with Helena and the USS San Francisco, which was in shambles, and two destroyers, the USS Sterett DD-407 and USS Fletcher DD-445. The Sterett's sonar was out of commission leaving the Fletcher as Hoover's only effective ASW ship. Hoover sent a signal to an overhead USAAF bomber to ask ComSoPac (Halsey) to rescue Juneau's survivors. The message was reportedly never received by Halsey. Admiral William Halsey, angered by Hoover's decision, had Captain Hoover removed from command, effectively ending his career. Halsey later expressed regret about his hasty decision to remove Hoover, but the damage had been done.

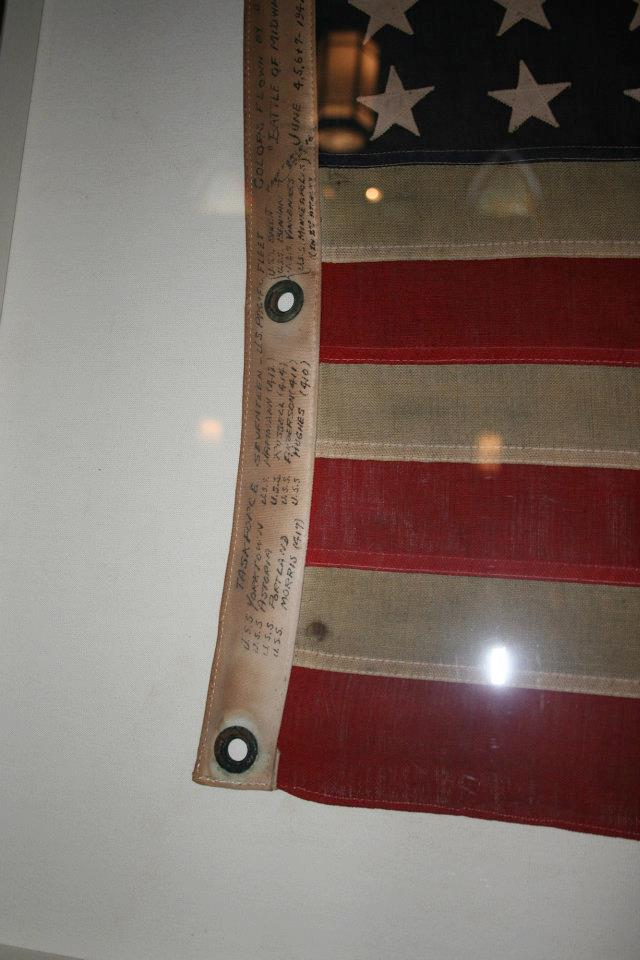
Flag in St. Michael's with names of Task Force 17 ships

== Later life ==
Hoover retired from the navy in 1947. In 1951 he returned to government service as a civilian official at the Atomic Energy Commission's (AEC) Sandia Base in Albuquerque, New Mexico. Following this he became manager of the AEC's facility in Boulder, Colorado. He returned to Bristol in 1956. Hoover died on January 10, 1980 at the Hattie Ida Chaffee Nursing Home in East Providence, Rhode Island at the age of 85.

== Personal life ==
Hoover served as a vestryman and warden of St. Michael's Episcopal Church where he donated a flag from Task Force 17 which is on display today. He was a member of the American Society of Metals, Army-Navy Legion of Valor, National Sojourners, Sons of the American Revolution, Chevy Chase Club, Hope Club, Bristol Yacht Club, and was a Mason. His first child, Gilbert Corwin Jr., was born in 1924 in Washington D.C. to Hoover's first wife, Martha Smith. Gilbert Jr. went on to graduate from Brown University and become an officer in the Navy. Hoover's two daughters were born to his second wife, Mabel Dumbbell.

== Awards and decorations ==
Navy Cross Rescuing survivors of USS Lexington during Battle of the Coral Sea

Navy Cross Battle of Cape Esperance

Navy Cross Naval Battle of Guadalcanal 12-13 Nov 1942
