= USS Farragut (DD-348) =

Farragut-class destroyer

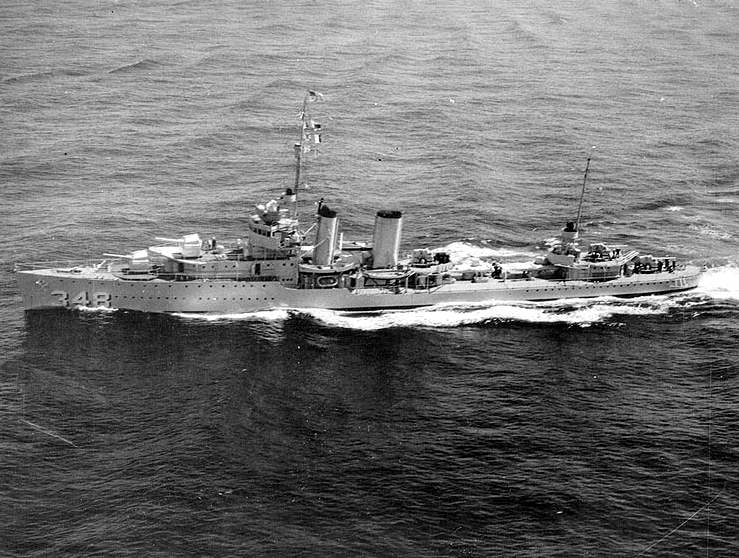
- USS Farragut, 14 September 1936

History

United States
- Namesake: David Glasgow Farragut
- Builder: Bethlehem Shipbuilding Corporation-Fore River Shipyard, Quincy, Massachusetts
- Laid down: 20 September 1932
- Launched: 15 March 1934
- Commissioned: 18 June 1934
- Decommissioned: 23 October 1945
- Stricken: 28 January 1947
- Fate: Sold for scrap, 14 August 1947

General characteristics
- Class & type: Farragut-class destroyer
- Displacement: 1,365 tons
- Length: 341 ft 3 in (104.01 m)
- Beam: 34 ft 3 in (10.44 m)
- Draught: 16 ft 2 in (4.93 m)
- Speed: 37 knots (69 km/h)
- Complement: 160 officers and enlisted
- Armament: As Built: 5 × 5" (127 mm)/38 cal DP (5x1), 8 × 21 inch (533 mm) T Tubes (2x4); 4 × .50 cal (12.7 mm) MG AA (4x1); c1943: 1 × Mk 33 Gun Fire Control System; 4 × 5" (127 mm)/38cal DP (4x1); 8 × 21" (533 mm) T Tubes (2x4); 5 × Oerlikon 20 mm AA (5x1); 2 × Mk 51 Gun Directors; 4 × Bofors 40 mm AA (2x2); 2 × Depth Charge stern racks

The third USS Farragut (DD-348) was named for Admiral David Glasgow Farragut (1801–1870). She was the lead ship of her class of destroyers in the United States Navy.

== History ==
Farragut was laid down by Bethlehem Shipbuilding Corporation's Fore River Shipyard in Quincy, Massachusetts, on 20 September 1932, launched on 15 March 1934 by Mrs. James Roosevelt, daughter-in-law of the President, and commissioned on 18 June 1934, with Commander Elliott Buckmaster in command.

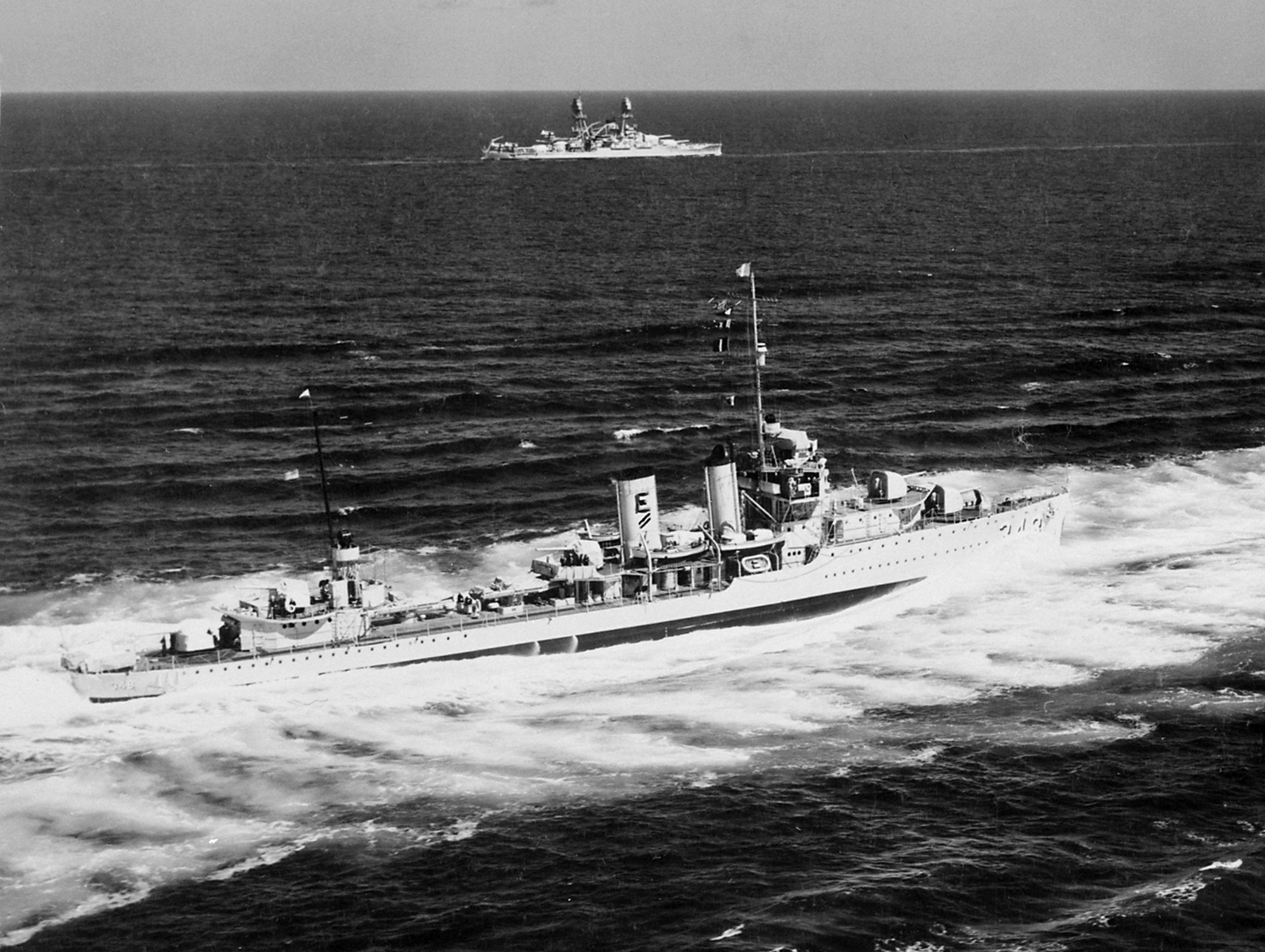
Farragut underway in September 1939.

Because it was nearly 14 years since a new destroyer had been commissioned in the U.S. Navy, Farragut devoted much of her early service to developmental operations, cruising out of her homeport of Norfolk, Virginia, to the Caribbean and along the east coast. On 26 March 1935, she embarked with President Franklin D. Roosevelt at Jacksonville, Florida, and the next day carried him to a rendezvous with a private yacht. Farragut escorted the President's yacht on a cruise to the Bahamas; on 7 April he embarked on her for passage to Jacksonville, where he left the ship on 8 April 1935.

Farragut sailed for San Diego, California, arriving there on 19 April 1935 to join Destroyer Squadron 20 as flagship. Fleet maneuvers on the west coast, training operations in the Hawaiian Islands, and cruises during the summer to train men of the Naval Reserve in Alaskan waters continued until 3 January 1939. Farragut then sailed for fleet maneuvers in the Caribbean, returning to San Diego on 12 April. From 2 October she was based at Pearl Harbor, and made two voyages to the west coast to screen carriers to Pearl Harbor. From 1 August 1941, Farragut was usually at sea for exercises with carrier task forces.

== World War II ==
Farragut was berthed in a nest of destroyers in East Loch, Pearl Harbor, at the time of the Japanese attack on 7 December 1941. Ensign James Armen Benham, her engineering officer and senior on board at the time, got her underway, and as she sailed down the channel, she kept up a steady fire. For his action, Ensign Benham was awarded the Bronze Star. Through March 1942, Farragut operated in Hawaiian waters, and from Oahu to San Francisco, California, on anti-submarine patrols and escort duty.

On 15 April 1942, Farragut sortied from Pearl Harbor with the Lexington (CV-2) task force, bound for the Coral Sea and a rendezvous with the Yorktown (CV-5) task force. Together these forces engaged Japanese forces in the Battle of the Coral Sea from 4 to 8 May 1942. For the first 2 days of the battle, Farragut sailed with the Attack Force, while the aircraft carriers in another group launched air strikes on Tulagi. On 6 May, all ships were united as TF 17, and sailed to the northwestward to make contact with the Japanese Port Moresby Invasion Group. Next day, Farragut was detached in the Support Group assigned to continue the search for the Japanese invasion forces. Farragut's group came under heavy air attack that afternoon, but downed at least five aircraft, and received no damage to any ship.

Farragut arrived at Cid Harbor, Australia, 11 May 1942, and until returning to Pearl Harbor 29 June, called at Brisbane, Nouméa, Suva, Tongatapu, and Auckland while on escort duty. She next sortied from Pearl Harbor 7 July 1942, in the USS Saratoga (CV-3) task force, bound for action in the Solomon Islands. She served as screening ship and plane guard during the air operations covering the assault on Guadalcanal 7 August, and then patrolled the eastern Solomons to protect sea lanes to Guadalcanal. On 24 and 25 August, the carrier she guarded engaged Japanese forces in the air Battle of the Eastern Solomons.

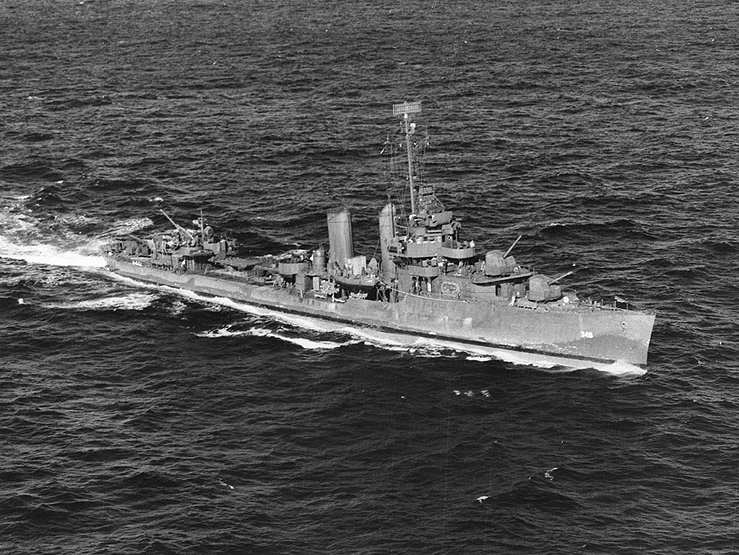
Farragut in December 1943.

The destroyer remained in the southwest Pacific, patrolling off Guadalcanal to guard unloading transports, and escorting convoys from Australia to Espiritu Santo, Nouméa, and the Fiji Islands. She returned to Pearl Harbor 27 January 1943, and after a west coast overhaul and training, arrived at Adak 16 April. She patrolled Alaskan waters until 11 May, when she screened transports landing troops on Adak from submarine attack. Next day she made several depth charge attacks on an enemy submarine and she continued anti-submarine patrol off the Aleutian Islands through June. Farragut patrolled and blockaded off Kiska from 5 July, joining in the bombardment of the island many times in the days before the landings of 15 August. She continued to protect the troops ashore at Kiska until 4 September, when she left Adak in convoy for San Francisco and a brief overhaul.

Farragut put to sea, from San Diego 19 October 1943, bound for training in the Hawaiian Islands and at Espiritu Santo. Again guarding carriers, she took part in the air operations covering the landings on Tarawa 20 November, and screened the carriers until the task force shaped course for Pearl Harbor 8 December. The destroyer continued on to the west coast for a brief repair period and training, sailing from San Diego 13 January 1944 for action in the Marshall Islands. During the assaults on Kwajalein and Eniwetok, she screened carriers, patrolled, and conducted anti-submarine searches, then sailed for air strikes on Woleai and Wakde. Late in April, she was off New Guinea as the carriers supported the landings in the Hollandia (currently known as Jayapura) area, and through May joined in training operations out of Majuro.

From her arrival off Saipan 11 June 1944, Farragut guarded the carriers covering the landings of 15 June, bombarded the shores of Saipan and Guam, and served as radar picket through the Battle of the Philippine Sea on 19 and 20 June. Farragut sailed to replenish at Eniwetok 28 June to 14 July. On 17 and 18 July, she closed the beach at Agat, Guam, to provide covering fire for underwater demolition teams preparing for the assault on the island. After screening a cruiser to Saipan she returned to Guam 21 July to patrol seaward of the Fire Support Group covering the assault landings. On 25 July, she joined in the bombardment of Rota, and 5 days later cleared for overhaul at Puget Sound Navy Yard.

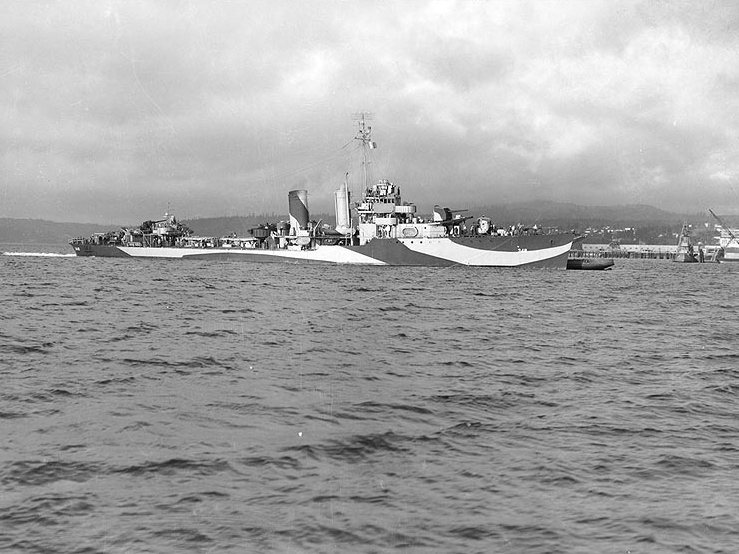
Farragut in dazzle pattern camouflage, September 1944.

Farragut arrived at Ulithi 21 November 1944, and sailed 4 days later to screen a group of oilers serving the fast carrier task force as it sent strikes against Taiwan and Luzon in preparation for the assault on Lingayen. Based on Ulithi, she served with this group as it supported the carriers in their operations of the Iwo Jima and Okinawa invasions, then from 25 to 28 April 1945 served on carrier screening duty for air operations on islands of the Ryukyus not yet invaded. From 11 May to 6 August, she escorted convoys between Ulithi and Okinawa, and during the last 2 weeks of May, served on radar picket duty at Okinawa.

== Fate ==
The destroyer was homeward bound from Saipan 21 August 1945, arriving at the Brooklyn Navy Yard 25 September. Farragut was decommissioned on 23 October 1945, stricken from the Naval Vessel Register on 28 January 1947 and sold for scrap on 14 August 1947.

Farragut received 14 battle stars for World War II service.
