= Elliott Buckmaster =

United States admiral

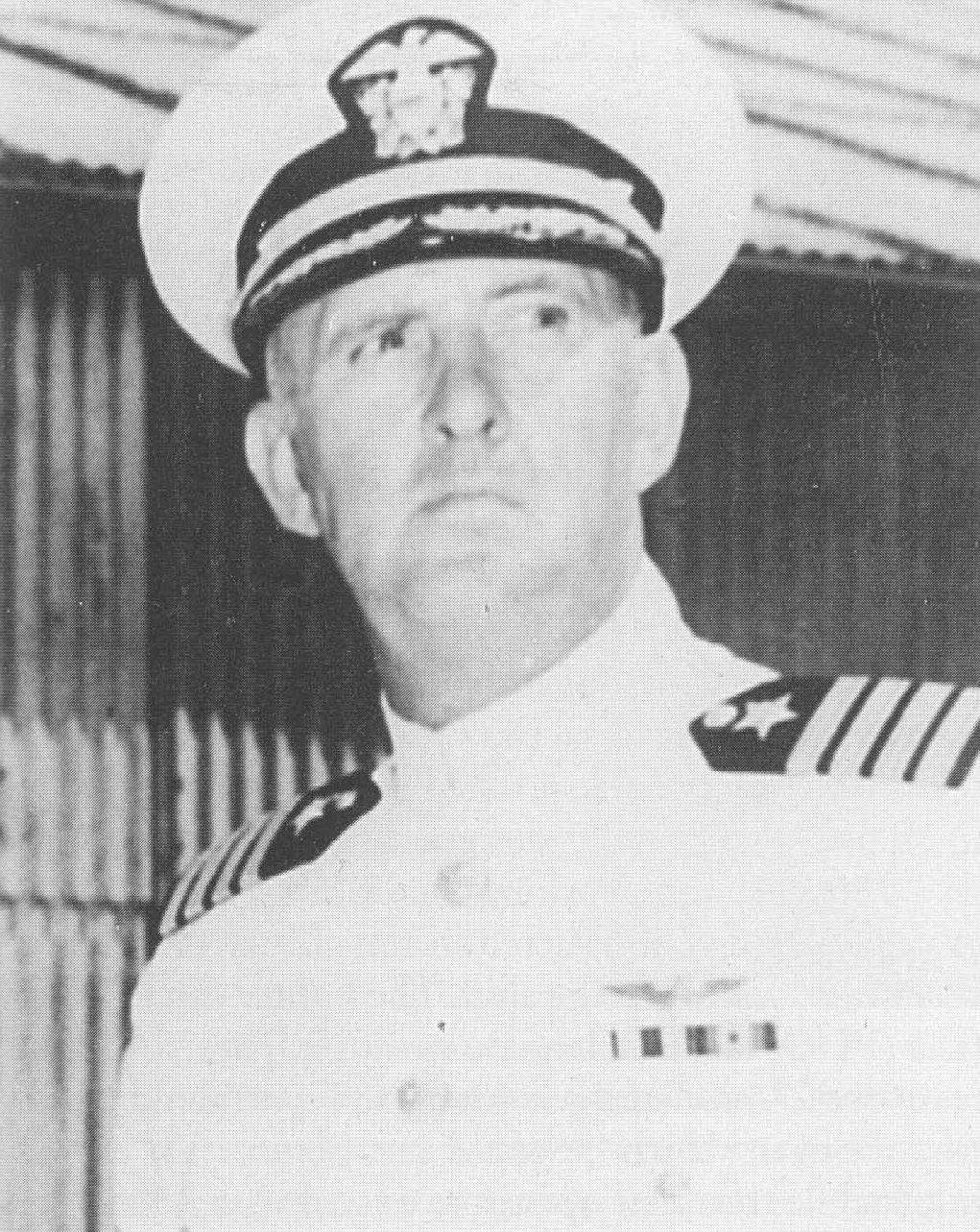
- Elliott Buckmaster, photographed as a Captain on September 6, 1940.
- Born: October 19, 1889; Brooklyn, New York, U.S.
- Died: October 10, 1976 (aged 86); Coronado, California, U.S.
- Military career
- Allegiance: United States of America
- Branch: United States Navy
- Service years: 1908–1946
- Rank: Vice Admiral
- Nickname: Buck
- Commands: USS Farragut; USS Yorktown; Western Carolines Operating Area
- Conflicts: Veracruz (1914); World War I World War II –Battle of the Coral Sea –Battle of Midway
- Awards: Distinguished Service Medal (2); Navy and Marine Corps Medal

Elliott Buckmaster (October 19, 1889 – October 10, 1976) was a United States Navy officer, later promoted to flag rank, and naval aviator during World War I and World War II.

Born in Brooklyn, New York, to Dr. Augustus Harper Buckmaster (1859–1941) and the former Helen Gardner Elliott Masters (1858–1910), Buckmaster was raised in Charlottesville, Virginia, from the age of twelve. Appointed from Virginia to the United States Naval Academy in 1908, Buckmaster graduated with the Class of 1912. His Naval Academy classmates included future admirals Daniel E. Barbey, Louis E. Denfield, Charles P. Mason, Charles A. Lockwood, Alfred E. Montgomery, DeWitt C. Ramsey, Mahlon Tisdale, Louis Wenzell, and Carleton F. Wright. Assigned to the USS New Jersey at the occupation of Veracruz in 1914, Buckmaster was credited with rescuing a wounded sailor and bringing him to safety. Buckmaster was promoted through the ranks until 1934 when, with the rank of commander, he would commission USS Farragut as her first commanding officer. Following command of Farragut, Commander Buckmaster applied for flight training at Naval Air Station Pensacola. Upon graduation in 1936 at age 47, Buckmaster performed duties in aviation until ordered in 1938 to USS Lexington as her executive officer. Serving in this capacity until 1939, he was then promoted to captain and ordered to Naval Air Station Ford Island as the commanding officer, serving in this capacity until January 1941.

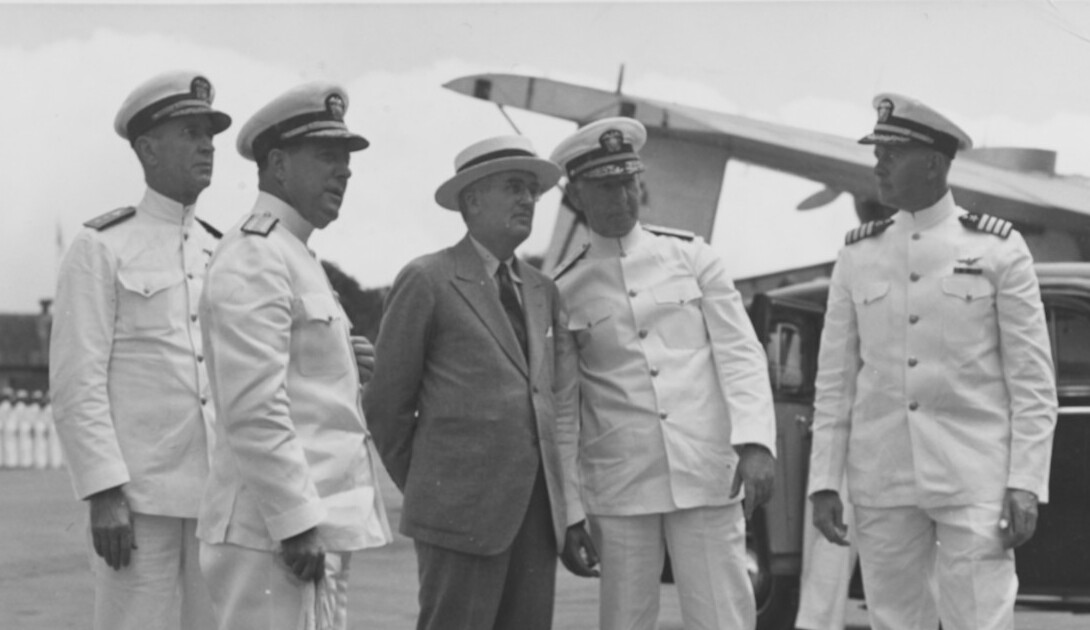
Navy Secretary Charles Edison's inspection tour of Naval Station Pearl Harbor on 12 April 1940. Left to right: Vice Admiral Ernest J. King, Rear Admiral Arthur L. Bristol, Charles Edison, Rear Admiral Claude C. Bloch and Captain Elliott Buckmaster.

On February 5, 1941, Captain Buckmaster assumed command of USS Yorktown at Naval Air Station Ford Island. He was Commanding Officer of Yorktown at the Battles of Coral Sea and Midway. The Yorktown suffered considerable damage during Coral Sea, but quickly, if superficially, repaired at Pearl Harbor. Her air group played a key role in the Midway in fatally crippling two of the four Japanese carriers, but she was seriously damaged in both air attacks made by the Japanese Carrier Striking Force. Buckmaster made the decision to abandon Yorktown after she was struck by two torpedoes at the Battle of Midway. Buckmaster, consulting with his executive officer, Dixie Kiefer, and the ship's chief engineer officer, John F. Delaney, Jr., they concluded that without power, and the undoing of the superficial repairs made at Pearl Harbor following the Coral Sea Battle, there was no hope of correcting a list that varied between 26 and 28 degrees. Indeed, it was feared "that the vessel might capsize at any moment and take many crewmen below decks with her". According to Yorktown crewmen, Buckmaster was thinking only of the welfare of the ship's company. While Yorktown was re-boarded the following day, 6 June 1942, she was sunk by I-168 following a torpedo attack that also sank USS Hammann.

Returning from Midway, Buckmaster was promoted to rear admiral and named the first Chief of Naval Air Primary Training (NAPTC). NAPTC headquarters were located at the Naval Air Training Station, Fairfax Airport, Kansas City, Kansas. Dixie Kiefer, his executive officer on Yorktown, was promoted to captain and became Buckmaster's chief of staff. Under Buckmaster's direction the Navy's first formal Flight Training Manuals were printed in two versions: "No.1 C.A.A.-W.T.S. ELEMENTARY" and "No. 2 PRIMARY". Both versions were printed by LA RUE in Kansas City (20,000 Sept 1943). The period from early 1942 through 1944 saw a rapid expansion of the Navy's flight training operations ending in 1944 with the formation of the Naval Air Training Command at Naval Air Station Pensacola under the command of Rear Admiral George D. Murray, who commanded the USS Enterprise during the Battle of Midway.

In 1945, Admiral Buckmaster served as Commander, Western Carolines Operating Area, On August 2 he spearheaded shore-based operations in the rescue of 317 survivors of the USS Indianapolis after her loss to enemy action.

Vice Admiral Buckmaster died in Coronado, California, on October 10, 1976, and was buried at San Diego's Holy Cross Roman Catholic Cemetery alongside his wife, Josie Haizlip Buckmaster (1892–1974).
