= Arnold E. True =

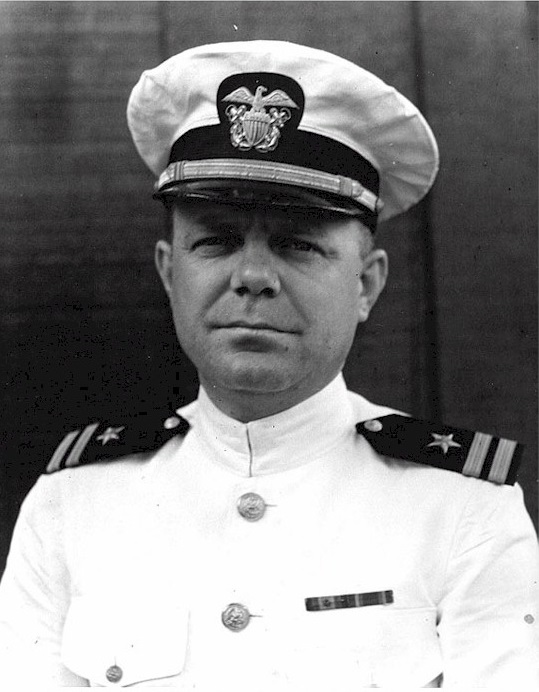
- Born: January 23, 1901; Owenton, Kentucky, U.S.
- Died: November 12, 1979 (aged 78); Palo Alto, California, U.S.
- Military career
- Allegiance: United States of America
- Branch: United States Navy
- Service years: 1917–1946
- Rank: Rear Admiral
- Commands: USS Hammann; Destroyer Division 4
- Conflicts: World War I; World War II; Battle of the Coral Sea; Battle of Midway; Guadalcanal Campaign; Western Sea Frontier
- Awards: Navy Cross; Navy DSM; Bronze Star Medal; Purple Heart

Arnold Ellsworth True (January 23, 1901 – December 11, 1979) was a highly decorated officer in the U.S. Navy with the rank of rear admiral, who is most famous for his service as Commanding officer of the Sims-class destroyer USS Hammann during the Battle of Midway.

== Early life ==
Arnold Ellsworth True was born in Owenton, Kentucky, on January 23, 1901, and graduated from the U.S. Naval Academy in 1920. His early naval career included serving in cruisers, destroyers, and other ships, as well as with airships until 1929, when he began studying Aerology and Meteorology. After receiving his Master of Science Degree from Massachusetts Institute of Technology in 1931, he practiced those disciplines in a variety of navy positions.

== World War II service ==
=== USS Hammann ===
Lieutenant Commander True attended the Naval War College in 1938-39 and then assumed command of the new destroyer USS Hammann (DD-412) in August 1939. His ship was part of the destroyer screen assigned to protect the USS Yorktown (CV-5) during the pivotal showdown with the Japanese Navy at The Battle of Midway. On June 6, 1942, after the carrier was damaged by Japanese dive bombers, his destroyer was ordered alongside the Yorktown to provide pumping power as part of a massive effort to keep the vessel afloat so that it could be salvaged.

According to the official navy record:

The first torpedo appeared to pass under the Hammann in the vicinity of No. 2 gun and exploded against the side of the Yorktown. The second torpedo struck the Hammann in #2 fireroom. This torpedo apparently broke the ship's back as a pronounced sag was noted in this vicinity. The forward bulkhead of forward engine room was carried away. Large quantities of oil, water, and debris were blown high into the air coming down on both Hammann and Yorktown. The Hammann was blown out from the Yorktown and aft parting all mooring lines and hoses. The commanding officer received a heavy blow in the solar plexus by being thrown against a desk in the pilot house, which rendered him temporarily unable to breathe or speak and later proved to have broken a rib. The ship began to settle immediately and the Executive Officer, who was on the bridge passed the word "All hands abandon ship." By the time the Commanding Officer was able to walk from the Pilot House to the starboard wing of the bridge, the main deck forward was awash and the ship was settling rapidly by the head. Life rafts had been launched and a great number of men were on the rafts or in the water. As soon as all personnel were clear of the bridge, the Gunnery Officer, Executive Officer and Commanding Officer climbed down the outside ladder to the forecastle deck. The forecastle deck was just submerging and all three swam clear of the ship. It is estimated that the ship sunk within three to four minutes from the time of the first torpedo explosion.

Hammann sank in four minutes. 80 of her crew were killed either by the initial torpedo blast, the inevitable sinking, or the setting off of her depth charges as she went down.

=== After Battle of Midway ===
Captain True went on to command Destroyer Division Four from late 1942 into 1943, and then the Navy Weather and Aerology billets until he retired from active duty in December 1946.

== Awards and decorations ==
During his career and service True earned numerous awards, including following:

1st Row	Navy Cross		Navy Distinguished Service Medal
2nd Row	Bronze Star Medal	Navy Commendation Medal	Purple Heart
3rd Row	World War I Victory Medal with Fleet Clasp	Yangtze Service Medal	American Defense Service Medal with "A" Device
4th Row	American Campaign Medal	Asiatic-Pacific Campaign Medal with seven service stars	World War II Victory Medal

== Retirement ==
Capt. True retired from active duty in December 1946, at which time he was promoted to the flag rank of rear admiral. For much of the remainder of his life, Admiral True wrote and lectured about the war in the Pacific. He openly opposed the Vietnam War. He died on December 11, 1979, in Palo Alto, California, at the age of 78.
