= USS Hughes =

Sims-class destroyer

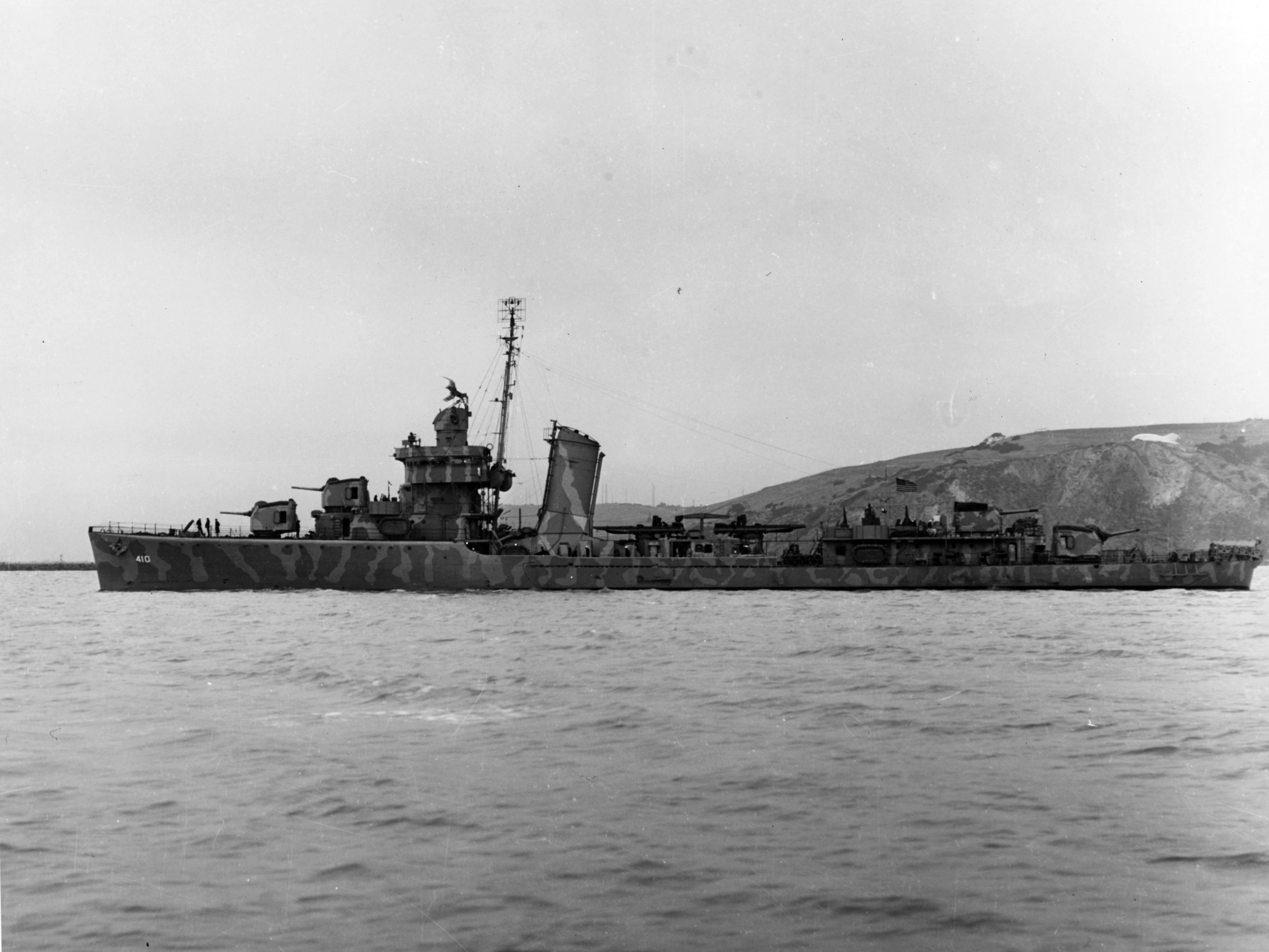
- Hughes off Mare Island Navy Yard, California on 1 August 1942

History

United States
- Builder: Bath Iron Works
- Laid down: 15 September 1937
- Launched: 17 June 1939
- Commissioned: 21 September 1939
- Decommissioned: 28 August 1946
- Stricken: 26 November 1948
- Honors and awards: American Defense Service Medal ("Fleet" clasp, "A" device); Asiatic-Pacific Campaign Medal ( 14 × battle stars); World War II Victory Medal; Navy Occupation Service Medal ("Japan" clasp)
- Fate: Sunk as target on 16 October 1948

General characteristics
- Class & type: Sims-class destroyer
- Displacement: 1,570 long tons (1,600 t) (std); 2,211 long tons (2,246 t) (full)
- Length: 348 ft 3 1/4 in (106.2 m)
- Beam: 36 ft 1 in (11.0 m)
- Draft: 13 ft 4.5 in (4.1 m)
- Propulsion: High-pressure super-heated boilers; Geared turbines with twin screws; 50,000 hp (37,000 kW)
- Speed: 35 knots (65 km/h; 40 mph)
- Range: 3,660 nmi (6,780 km; 4,210 mi) at 20 kn (37 km/h; 23 mph)
- Complement: 192 (10 officers/182 enlisted)
- Armament: 5 × 5 inch/38, in single mounts; 4 × .50 caliber/90, in single mounts; 8 × 21 inch torpedo tubes in two quadruple mounts; 2 × depth charge track, 10 depth charges
- Armor: None

USS Hughes (DD-410) was a World War II-era Sims-class destroyer in the service of the United States Navy.

== Namesake ==
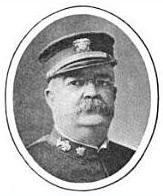
CDR Edward Merritt Hughes

Edward Merritt Hughes was born on 28 January 1850 in Lockbourne, Ohio, the son of merchant Abram A. Hughes. He was appointed to the United States Naval Academy in 1866 and graduated on 7 June 1870. He passed through the grades of Ensign, Master, Lieutenant, Lieutenant Commander, and, on 3 March 1901, was commissioned Commander.

After service on a number of ships and stations ashore, he reached the high point in his career during the Spanish–American War. He was Executive Officer of USS Petrel during the Battle of Manila Bay. Immediately after the action, he commanded a small boat which boarded and set fire to five Spanish ships lying in Cavite Harbor, despite reports that fuses had been set to their magazines and in the face of a large and excited armed force on shore nearby. He was advanced five numbers in rank for eminent and conspicuous conduct on this occasion. His commanding officer later wrote, "The action of Lieutenant Hughes in setting fire to the enemy's sunken ships in the face of a well armed superior, but demoralized force, was the one act of conspicuous gallantry which the battle that day afforded."

Commander Hughes died in the U.S. Naval Hospital in Yokohama, Japan on 28 September 1903.

== Construction and commissioning ==
Hughes was laid down on 15 September 1937 by Bath Iron Works, Bath, Maine; launched on 17 June 1939; sponsored by Mrs. Edward M. Hughes, widow of Commander Hughes; and commissioned at Boston Navy Yard, on 21 September 1939, Lieutenant Commander Donald J. Ramsey in command.

== Service history ==
=== Interwar period ===
Following shakedown in the Gulf of Mexico, Hughes joined the Atlantic Fleet. From July 1940 to December 1941, Hughes served in the Atlantic, first on patrol off Martinique to watch Vichy French Forces there and then on Neutrality patrol off Iceland. During this time, she became the first American destroyer to escort a British convoy all the way to England.

=== World War II ===
Following the attack on Pearl Harbor, warships were urgently needed in the Pacific and Hughes sailed from Norfolk, Virginia on 18 December 1941, arriving San Diego, California in company with Yorktown, on 30 December. She departed San Diego on 12 January 1942 as an escort for ships bringing reinforcements to Samoa. Hughes then sailed from Samoa as part of a carrier striking force built around carrier Yorktown. She screened the carrier in strikes on Jaluit, Makin, Mili, and Canton Islands, then supported the combined Lexington–Yorktown Task Force 17 (TF17), as it attacked Japanese bases at Lae and Salamaua on 10 March 1942. Missing the Battle of the Coral Sea while escorting a tanker carrying fuel to Nouméa, Hughes reached Pearl Harbor in time to participate in the Battle of Midway.

Hughes, while protecting Yorktown during this action, shot down two torpedo planes and assisted in shooting down two others. After Yorktown was hit on 4 June, Hughes continued an all-night vigil to prevent her capture. When the carrier was torpedoed by a submarine on 6 June, Hughes helped damage the attacker with depth charges, and rescued the survivors when Yorktown sank the next day.

After a brief time as convoy escort, she joined American Forces at Guadalcanal, where she screened Hornet throughout the campaign. During the Battle of Santa Cruz. Hughes splashed one Japanese plane and assisted in downing two more. Despite her valiant efforts, Hornet was hit and sunk on 27 October 1942. Joining TF 16 on 10 November 1942, Hughes participated in the Naval Battle of Guadalcanal by screening Enterprise. Hughes continued screening operations until the end of February 1943.

Following a refit and brief convoy duty, Hughes was detached from the South Pacific and sailed to Pearl Harbor, departing on 18 April 1943 for the Aleutian Islands, where she arrived on 24 April. Bombardments of Kiska from 6–22 July were high points of her months in northern waters. After Kiska was occupied, Hughes departed the Aleutians for overhaul on 25 August in San Francisco, California.

Following overhaul, Hughes sailed for Pearl Harbor on 26 October 1943 to prepare for the invasion of the Gilbert Islands. She sailed on 10 November as part of the screen for the escort carriers covering the invasion of Makin Atoll. When Liscome Bay was sunk on 24 November, Hughes rescued 152 of the survivors. She began screening the transport group on 27 November, and 2 days later departed for Pearl Harbor, and arrived there on 7 December 1943. On 13 January 1944, Hughes joined TF 53 for the invasion of the Marshall Islands. She joined in the preinvasion from 3–11 February 1944. The destroyer continued to support the escort carriers during the strikes against Palaus on 31 March 1944.

Hughes took part in the invasion of Hollandia, New Guinea on 23 April 1944, acting as a screen for the escort carrier group which provided air cover for the landings at Aitape and Tanahmerah Bay. Hughes remained off New Guinea as a convoy escort and fire-support ship of the 7th Fleet until 25 September, when she departed for the invasion of the Philippines. During this time, Hughes participated in the invasions of Biak, Noemfoor, Cape Sensapor, and Morotai, serving as flagship of Rear Admiral William M. Fechteler during the latter campaign.

During the invasion of Leyte, Hughes was the flagship of Rear Admiral Arthur Dewey Struble commanding the tiny task group detailed to capture the small islands of Dinigat and Homohon guarding the entrance to Leyte Gulf. Following the successful conclusion of this operation, Hughes screened Philippine bound convoys, making frequent trips to and from New Guinea until 6 December 1944, when she reembarked Admiral Struble and departed for the invasion of Ormoc Bay, Leyte. Following this operation, Hughes was serving as a picket destroyer off the southern tip of Leyte when she was hit by a kamikaze on 10 December 1944. Her dead and wounded totaled twenty three. Badly damaged with one engine room demolished and much of her other machinery destroyed, Hughes was towed to San Pedro Bay, Leyte, where, after temporary repairs, she departed for Humboldt Bay, New Guinea on 19 December en route to Pearl Harbor, where she arrived on 23 January 1945. Following more repairs, she sailed for San Francisco, arriving San Francisco Naval Shipyard on 2 February. Hughes remained there for the next three months undergoing extensive overhaul.

After a long testing period, Hughes was declared combat ready and departed for Adak Island in the Aleutians on 4 June 1945. Assigned to the Northern Pacific Force, she remained in the Aleutians until the end of the war, harassing enemy shipping and bombarding Japanese bases. Hughes then served as part of the patrol force off Northern Honshū until relieved on 20 October. She sailed for the United States 10 days later with Destroyer Squadron 2. She was decommissioned on 28 August 1946, and was used as a target ship in the Operation Crossroads atomic bomb test. Following the test she was towed to sea and sunk off Kwajalein on 16 October 1948, and struck from the Naval Vessel Register on 26 November 1948.

== Awards ==
Hughes earned 14 battle stars for World War II service.

== In fiction ==
- In the 2003 video game Secret Weapons Over Normandy, USS Hughes is seen as one of the escort ships for the aircraft carrier USS Yorktown at the Battle of Midway.
