= USS Hammann (DD-412) =

Sims-class destroyer

Coordinates: 30°36′N 176°34′W

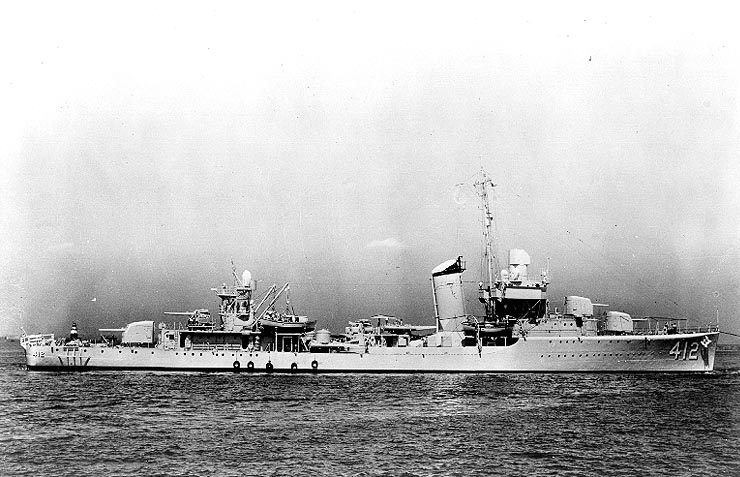
- Hammann after completion in 1939

History

United States
- Namesake: Charles Hammann
- Builder: Federal Shipbuilding and Drydock Company
- Laid down: 17 January 1938
- Launched: 4 February 1939
- Commissioned: 11 August 1939
- Out of service: June 1942
- Identification: DD-412
- Honors and awards: American Defense Service Medal ("Fleet" clasp, "A" device), Asiatic-Pacific Campaign Medal (2 stars), World War II Victory Medal
- Fate: Sunk by I-168 at the Battle of Midway on 6 June 1942

General characteristics
- Class & type: Sims-class destroyer
- Displacement: 1,570 long tons (1,600 t) (std); 2,211 long tons (2,246 t) (full)
- Length: 348 ft 3 1/4 in (106.2 m)
- Beam: 36 ft 1 in (11.0 m)
- Draft: 13 ft 4.5 in (4.1 m)
- Propulsion: High-pressure super-heated boilers; Geared turbines with twin screws; 50,000 hp (37,000 kW)
- Speed: 35 knots (65 km/h; 40 mph)
- Range: 3,660 nmi (6,780 km; 4,210 mi) at 20 kn (37 km/h; 23 mph)
- Complement: 192 (10 officers/182 enlisted)
- Armament: 4 × single 5-inch/38-caliber guns; 4 × single .50-caliber machine guns; 2 × quadruple 21-inch torpedo tubes; 2 × depth charge track, 10 depth charges

USS Hammann (DD-412) was a World War II-era Sims-class destroyer in the service of the United States Navy, named after Ensign Charles Hammann, a Medal of Honor recipient from World War I. Hammann was torpedoed and sunk during the Battle of Midway, while assisting the sinking aircraft carrier USS Yorktown.

Hammann was launched by the Federal Shipbuilding and Drydock Company, Kearny, New Jersey, on 4 February 1939, sponsored by Miss Lillian Hammann, and commissioned on 11 August 1939, Commander Arnold E. True in command. Hammann conducted shakedown off the East Coast and for the next two years participated in training and readiness operations off both coasts.

== Service history ==
=== Prewar ===
On 10 June 1939, while pulling away from the dock yard in Kearny, New Jersey, Hammann briefly crossed paths with USS Warrington, which was sailing from Sandy Hook, New Jersey, to New York City, with King George VI and Queen Elizabeth aboard during their royal tour of the United States. On 14 June The Evening Star reported that during Hammann's sea trials off the coast of Fire Island in the Atlantic Ocean, Senator Ernest Lundeen joined a civilian and press delegation aboard the ship that reached a maximum speed of 40 knots, put screws in full reverse, causing the ship to come to a complete stop in 58 seconds, and then the ship travelled in reverse at a top speed nearing 20 knots.

=== World War II ===
==== Transfer from North Atlantic Patrol to Pacific Duty ====
On 7 December 1941, 30 minutes after receiving news of the attack on Pearl Harbor, Hammann and the other ships in the North Atlantic Patrol left Reykjavík and steamed for the United States. On 17 December, she arrived in Norfolk, Virginia, for fuel, supplies, and new crew. Shortly thereafter, she steamed around Cape Hatteras for Charleston, South Carolina. From there, in early January, she met with the battleship New Mexico and the troop transport President Hayes to escort the pair through the Panama Canal for San Diego and later San Francisco. On 22 January 1942, she arrived in Pearl Harbor and joined Vice Admiral Frank Jack Fletcher's Task Force 17 for action in the South Pacific.

==== Pacific Duty ====
The destroyer took part in training maneuvers in the New Caledonia area during early March, and on 27 March, the Task Force departed for the Coral Sea. Hammann acted as screening ship and plane guard for the aircraft carrier Lexington, Returning to Tongatapu on 20 April, the task force sortied again into the Coral Sea on 27 April for a surprise air raid on Japanese invasion forces on Tulagi.

While screening the carriers during the air raids of 4 May, Hammann was directed to rescue two fighter pilots downed on Guadalcanal, some 40 miles (64 km) to the north. Steaming at full speed, the destroyer arrived at dusk and sighted a marker on the beach, which proved to be a parachute. The motor whaleboat was put over the side, but dangerous surf prevented it from landing. Consequently, the pilots were recovered with the use of lines from the boat. This accomplished, an attempt was made to destroy the wreckage of the aircraft, but the rough water made this impossible, and Hammann returned to Lexington's screen from this successful operation that night.

==== The Battle of the Coral Sea ====
On 8 May came the main action of the Battle of the Coral Sea, the first naval engagement fought entirely on both sides between aircraft and ships. During the exchange of air attacks, Hammann screened the carriers, firing at Japanese torpedo planes as they attacked. Just as the torpedo planes retired, dive bombers appeared, one exploding a bomb 200 yards (180 m) off Hammann's starboard bow. Lexington, which had taken two devastating torpedo hits to port, was first thought to be under control, but a large internal explosion shortly before 13:00, followed later by others, sealed her fate. As the order was given to abandon ship, Hammann, Morris, and Anderson stood by to receive survivors. The destroyer picked up nearly 500 men from the water before Lexington went down the night of 8 May, scuttled by a torpedo from the destroyer Phelps.

==== The Battle of Midway ====
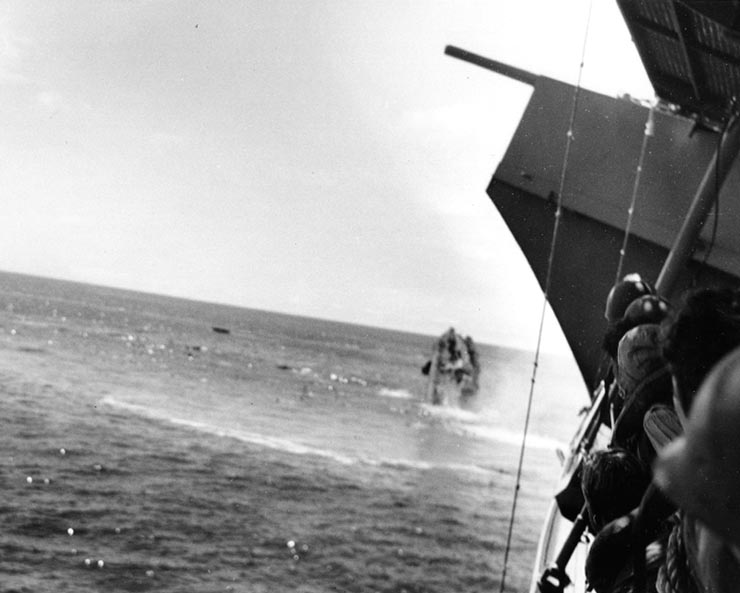
Hammann sinking by the bow after being torpedoed and breaking in half

The Battle of the Coral Sea, which checked the Japanese advance to the southeast, was over, but new demands called Hammann to the north. Under urgent orders from Admiral Chester Nimitz to meet a new threat, Hammann moved to Pearl Harbor with the task force, arriving on 27 May. After making repairs, she got underway on 30 May and was just in time to take part in the Battle of Midway.

During the air battle on 4 June, Hammann screened the carrier Yorktown, helping to shoot down many of the attacking aircraft. However, the carrier took two torpedo hits, and listing heavily, she was abandoned that afternoon. Hammann picked up survivors in the water, including Yorktown's commanding officer, Captain Elliott Buckmaster, and transferred them to the larger ships. Efforts were mounted to save the stricken carrier on the next morning. A skeleton crew returned on board the Yorktown, and attempts were made to tow her to safety. Hammann came alongside on 6 June to transfer a damage-control party. The destroyer then lay alongside, providing hoses and water for firefighting, power, and other services while tied up next to the carrier.

The salvage party was making progress when the protective destroyer screen was penetrated by Japanese submarine I-168 after noon on 6 June. Four torpedoes were fired; one missed, two passed under Hammann and hit Yorktown, and the fourth hit the destroyer amidships, breaking her in half.

As the debris from the explosion rained down and the ships lurched apart, the destroyer apparently was doomed. Life rafts were lowered and rescue efforts by surrounding ships commenced. Hammann sank, bow first, in just 4 minutes. During that time, Chief Machinist Mate Daniel William Carlson was able to launch a life raft, pass out life vests, and help others over the side of the ship to safety. Following the sinking, a violent underwater explosion occurred, the likely cause of which was the destroyer's depth charges and torpedoes. The explosion caused many deaths in the water, bringing the death toll to 80. Survivors were taken aboard the destroyers Benham and Balch.

== Awards ==
Hammann's skipper, Commander Arnold True, was awarded the Navy Cross and a Navy Distinguished Service Medal for his performance while in command of Hammann at Coral Sea and Midway. Ensign Theodore E. Krepski was awarded the Navy Cross for his actions rescuing sailors abandoning Lexington at Coral Sea. Hammann also received two battle stars for her service in World War II.

American Defense Service Medal with "A" Device and "Fleet" clasp	Asiatic-Pacific Campaign Medal with 2 stars	World War II Victory Medal
