= USS Yorktown (CV-5) =

Yorktown-class aircraft carrier of the U.S. Navy

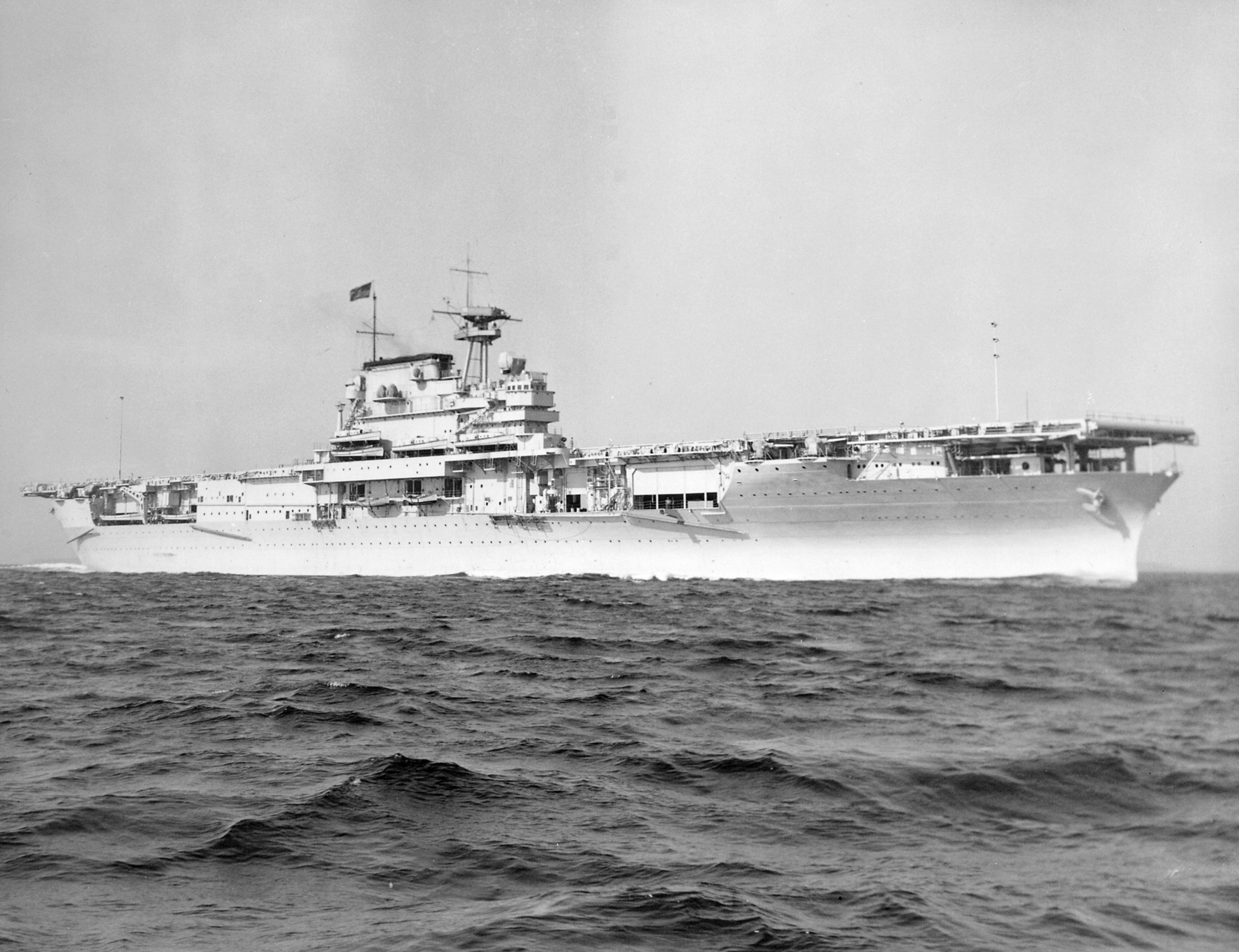
- Yorktown in July 1937

History

United States
- Name: USS Yorktown
- Namesake: Battle of Yorktown
- Ordered: 3 August 1933
- Builder: Newport News Shipbuilding, Newport News, Virginia
- Laid down: 21 May 1934
- Launched: 4 April 1936
- Sponsored by: Mrs. Eleanor Roosevelt
- Commissioned: 30 September 1937
- Stricken: 2 October 1942
- Identification: CV-5
- Honors and awards: 3 × battle stars
- Fate: Sunk following the Battle of Midway, 5–7 June 1942; Wreck discovered, 19 May 1998 30°35′59″N 176°34′4″W

General characteristics
- Class & type: Yorktown-class aircraft carrier
- Displacement: 25,500 long tons (25,900 t) (full load)
- Length: As built: 770 ft (234.7 m) (waterline); 824 ft 9 in (251.4 m) (o/a)
- Beam: As built: 83 ft 3 in (25.4 m) (waterline); 109 ft 6 in (33.4 m) (o/a)
- Draft: 26 ft (7.9 m)
- Installed power: 9 × Babcock & Wilcox boilers; 120,000 shp (89,000 kW)
- Propulsion: 4 × screws; 4 × geared steam turbines
- Speed: 32.5 knots (60.2 km/h; 37.4 mph)
- Range: 12,500 nautical miles (23,200 km; 14,400 mi) at 15 knots (28 km/h; 17 mph)
- Complement: 2,217 officers and men (1941)
- Sensors & processing systems: CXAM radar from 1940
- Armament: As built: 8 × single 5 in/38 cal guns; 4 × quad 1.1 in/75 cal guns; 24 × .50 caliber machine guns; From February 1942: 8 × single 5"/38 caliber guns; 4 × quad 1.1"/75 caliber guns; 24 × 20mm Oerlikon guns; 24 × .50 caliber machine guns
- Armor: 2.5–4 inches (6.4–10.2 cm) belt; 60 lb protective decks; 4 inches (10 cm) bulkheads; 4 inch side and 3 inch top round conning tower; 4 inch side over steering gear
- Aircraft carried: 90 aircraft
- Aviation facilities: 3 × aircraft elevators; 2 × flight deck catapults; 1 × hangar deck catapult

USS Yorktown (CV-5) was an aircraft carrier that served in the United States Navy during World War II. Named after the 1781 Battle of Yorktown, she was commissioned in 1937. Yorktown was the lead ship of the three-ship Yorktown class. These large vessels were the first American carriers whose design was informed by actual experience with carrier operations, involving both larger vessels (the converted battlecruisers of the Lexington class), and to a lesser extent, a smaller one (the primitive, experimental Langley; a newer small carrier, USS Ranger, had recently been completed, but not yet commissioned by the time Yorktown was laid down, and she contributed nothing to the latter vessel's design).

After her commissioning, Yorktown spent two years operating in the Atlantic before transferring to the Pacific in April 1939. Two years after that, she was one of a large number of major combatants that were transferred back to the Atlantic to take part in neutrality patrols, aimed primarily at monitoring German activity off America's East Coast. The attack on Pearl Harbor took place while she was in port at Norfolk. Shortly after the attack, she was sent back to the Pacific, arriving at San Diego in late December 1941. In January 1942, she escorted a troop convoy to Samoa; having completed this task, she collaborated with her sister-ship, Enterprise, in early February on a series of raids on Japanese facilities in the Gilbert and Marshall Islands. Yorktown then proceeded on to Pearl Harbor, where she dropped off a consignment of much-needed spare aircraft for the base.

In late February 1942, she was back at sea, meeting with the carrier Lexington, with the intention of participating in raids on the towns of Rabaul and Gasmata, on the island of New Britain. Plans were changed, however, and the two carriers instead launched, on 10 March 1942, a successful attack on Japanese shipping off the north coast of New Guinea from a launch point just off the south coast. Following this strike, Lexington returned to Pearl Harbor, while Yorktown stayed on in the South Pacific for another two months, ultimately spending 100 days away from a major port.

In early May, while awaiting Lexington's return, Yorktown aircraft sank or damaged several small warships supporting the invasion of Tulagi, an administrative center in the Solomon Islands. Yorktown's intervention tipped off the Japanese as to the American presence in the area and helped precipitate, a few days later, the Battle of the Coral Sea, when Japanese carrier forces escorting a landing force intent on taking Port Moresby, on the south coast of New Guinea, confronted a task force built around Yorktown and Lexington in history's first carrier-versus-carrier battle. American carrier planes sank the light aircraft carrier Shōhō on 7 May and badly damaged the fleet carrier Shōkaku the following day, but Lexington was sunk and Yorktown severely damaged in the exchange.

Despite the damage, Yorktown was able to make it back to Hawaii, entering drydock at Pearl Harbor during the last week of May and being patched up well enough in only three days to be more-or-less combat-ready. This rapid repair job was important because American intelligence had determined that a major Japanese force was already heading toward Midway Atoll, 1000 miles west of Pearl Harbor. The Japanese hoped to draw the Americans into a decisive battle at Midway, but tipped off, the U.S. Navy made plans to ambush the Japanese fleet. Repaired, Yorktown was available to join her two sister ships, Enterprise and Hornet, in executing this plan.

On the morning of 4 June 1942, aircraft from Yorktown and Enterprise inflicted ultimately fatal damage on three Japanese fleet carriers. Later in the day Yorktown absorbed the full force of two counterattacks launched by the sole surviving Japanese fleet carrier, which left Yorktown crippled. Salvage efforts on Yorktown were encouraging, but on 6 June, she was struck by two torpedoes fired by a Japanese submarine and sank the next day.

The wreck of Yorktown was located by oceanographer Robert Ballard in 1998.

== Early career ==
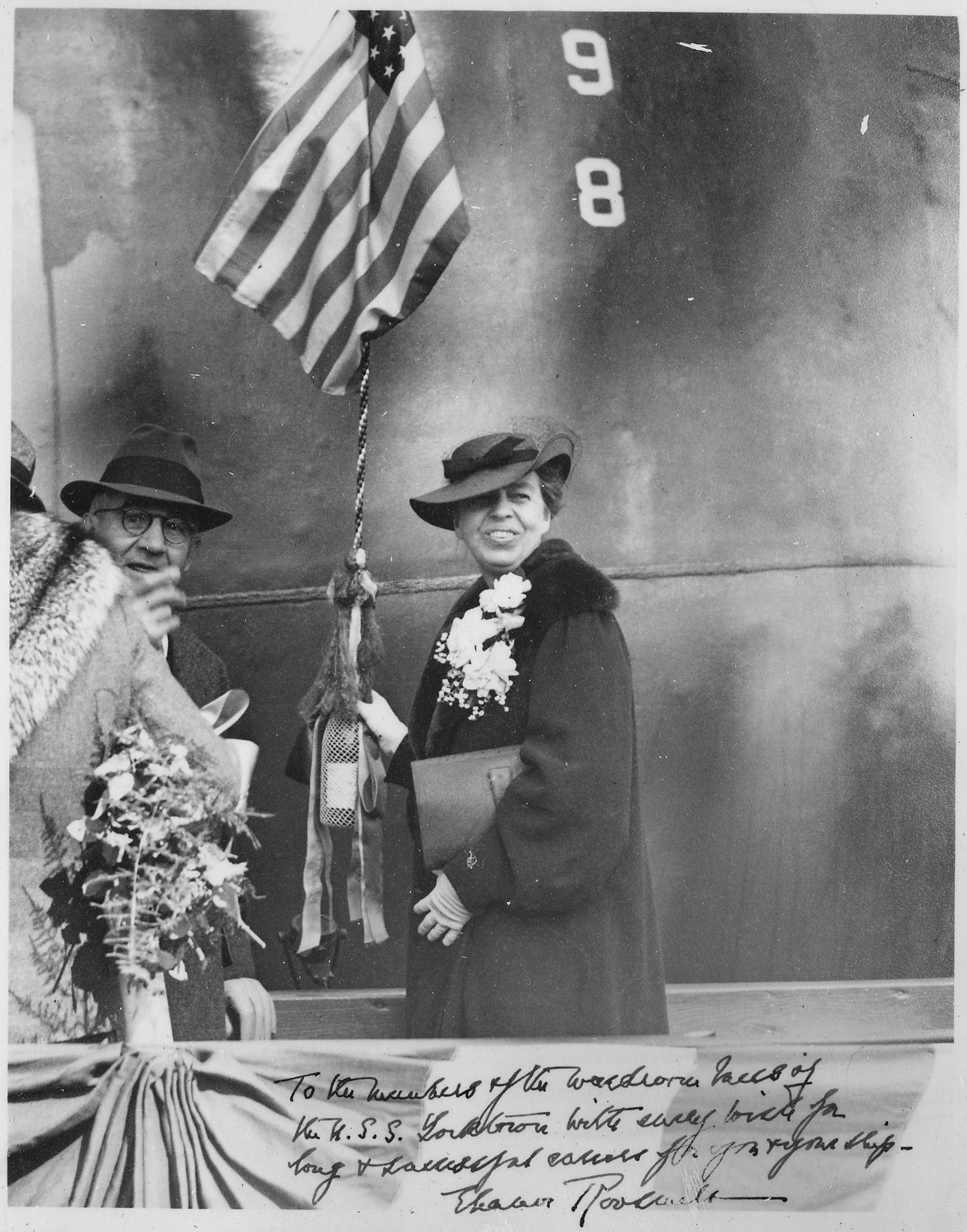
Eleanor Roosevelt christens Yorktown (4 April 1936)

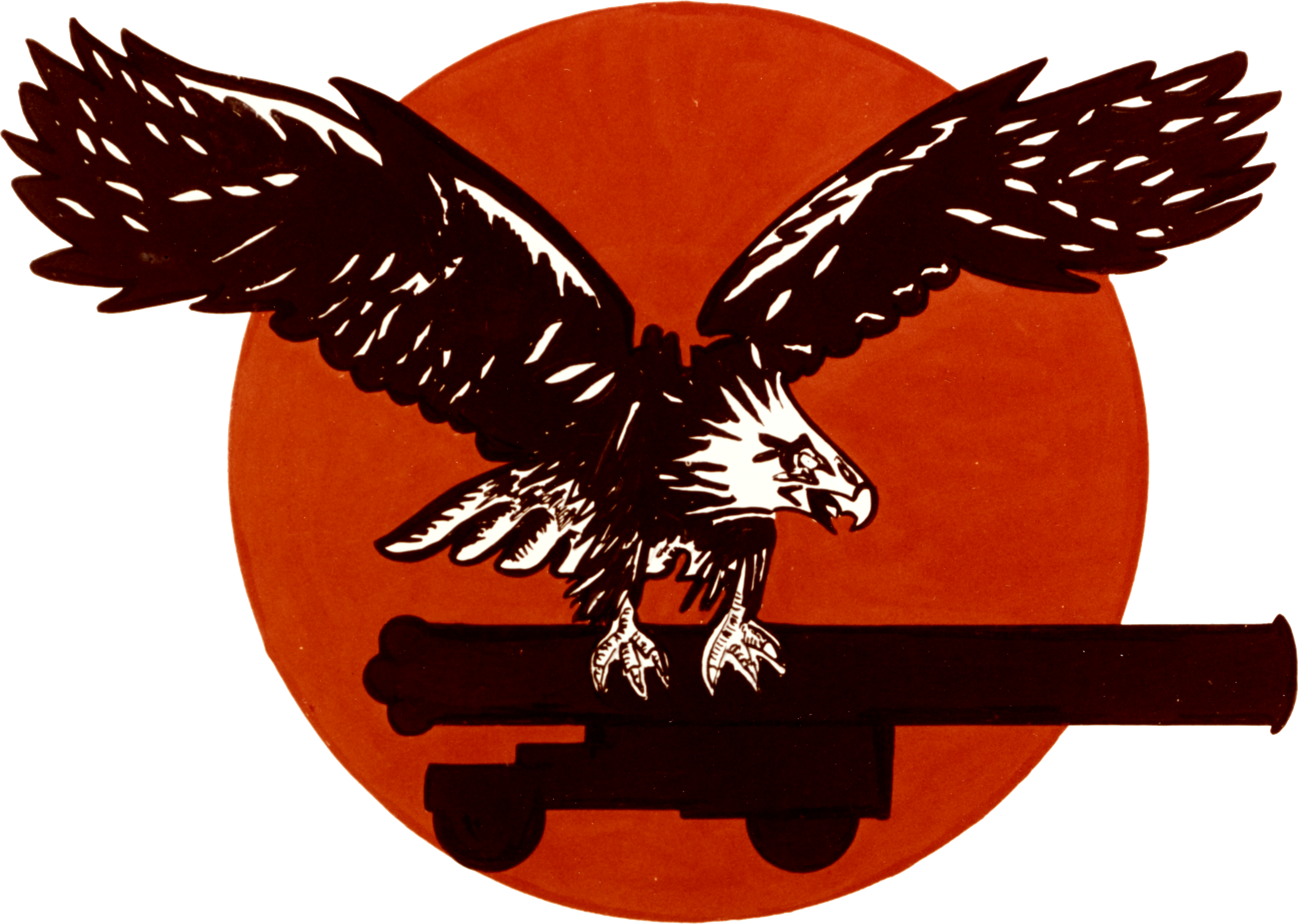
Yorktown ship's insignia

Yorktown was laid down on 21 May 1934 at Newport News, Virginia, by the Newport News Shipbuilding and Drydock Co.; launched on 4 April 1936; sponsored by Eleanor Roosevelt; and commissioned at the Naval Station Norfolk (NS Norfolk), Norfolk, Virginia, on 30 September 1937, Captain Ernest D. McWhorter in command.

After fitting out, the aircraft carrier trained in Hampton Roads, Virginia and in the Southern Drill Grounds off the Virginia capes into January 1938, conducting carrier qualifications for her newly embarked air group.

Yorktown sailed for the Caribbean on 8 January 1938 and arrived at Culebra, Puerto Rico, on 13 January. Over the ensuing month, the carrier conducted her shakedown, touching at Charlotte Amalie, St Thomas, U.S. Virgin Islands; Gonaïves, Haiti; Guantánamo Bay, Cuba, and Cristóbal, Panama Canal Zone. Departing Colón Bay, Cristóbal, on 1 March, Yorktown sailed for Hampton Roads, arrived on 6 March, and put into the Norfolk Navy Yard the next day for post-shakedown availability.

After undergoing repairs through the early autumn of 1938, Yorktown moved station from the navy yard to NS Norfolk on 17 October 1938 and soon headed for the Southern Drill Grounds for training.

Yorktown operated off the eastern seaboard, ranging from Chesapeake Bay to Guantanamo Bay, into 1939. As flagship for Carrier Division 2, she participated in her first war game—Fleet Problem XX—along with her sister-ship Enterprise in February 1939. The scenario for the exercise called for one fleet to control the sea lanes in the Caribbean against the incursion of a foreign European power while maintaining sufficient naval strength to protect vital American interests in the Pacific. The maneuvers were witnessed, in part, by President Franklin Delano Roosevelt, embarked in the heavy cruiser Houston.

The critique of the operation revealed that carrier operations—a part of the scenarios for the annual exercises since the entry of Langley into the war games in 1925—had achieved a new peak of efficiency. Despite the inexperience of Yorktown and Enterprise—comparative newcomers to the Fleet—both carriers made significant contributions to the success of the problem. The planners had studied the employment of carriers and their embarked air groups in connection with convoy escort, antisubmarine defense, and various attack measures against surface ships and shore installations. In short, they worked to develop the tactics that would be used when war actually came.

== Pacific Fleet ==
Following Fleet Problem XX, Yorktown returned briefly to Hampton Roads before sailing for the Pacific on 20 April 1939. Transiting the Panama Canal a week later, Yorktown soon commenced a regular routine of operations with the Pacific Fleet. The Second World War started on 1 September 1939, but the USA was not yet involved. Operating out of San Diego into 1940,participated in Fleet Problem XXI that April. Yorktown was one of six ships to receive the new RCA CXAM radar in 1940. At the same time her signal bridge atop the tripod foremast was enclosed, and several 50 caliber machine guns were fitted in galleries along the edges of the flight deck.

Fleet Problem XXI—a two-part exercise—included some of the operations that would characterize future warfare in the Pacific. The first part of the exercise was devoted to training in making plans and estimates; in screening and scouting; in coordination of combatant units; and in employing fleet and standard dispositions. The second phase included training in convoy protection, the seizure of advanced bases, and, ultimately, the decisive engagement between the opposing fleets. The last pre-war exercise of its type, Fleet Problem XXI contained two exercises (comparatively minor at the time) where air operations played a major role. Fleet Joint Air Exercise 114A prophetically pointed out the need to coordinate Army and Navy defense plans for the Hawaiian Islands, and Fleet Exercise 114 proved that aircraft could be used for high altitude tracking of surface forces—a significant role for planes that would be fully realized in the war to come.

With the retention of the Fleet in Hawaiian waters after the conclusion of Fleet Problem XXI, Yorktown operated in the Pacific off the west coast of the United States and in Hawaiian waters until the following spring, when the success of German U-boats preying upon British shipping in the Atlantic required a shift of American naval strength. Thus, to reinforce the U.S. Atlantic Fleet, the Navy transferred a substantial force from the Pacific including Yorktown, Battleship Division Three (the New Mexico-class battleships), three light cruisers, and 12 accompanying destroyers.

== Neutrality patrol ==
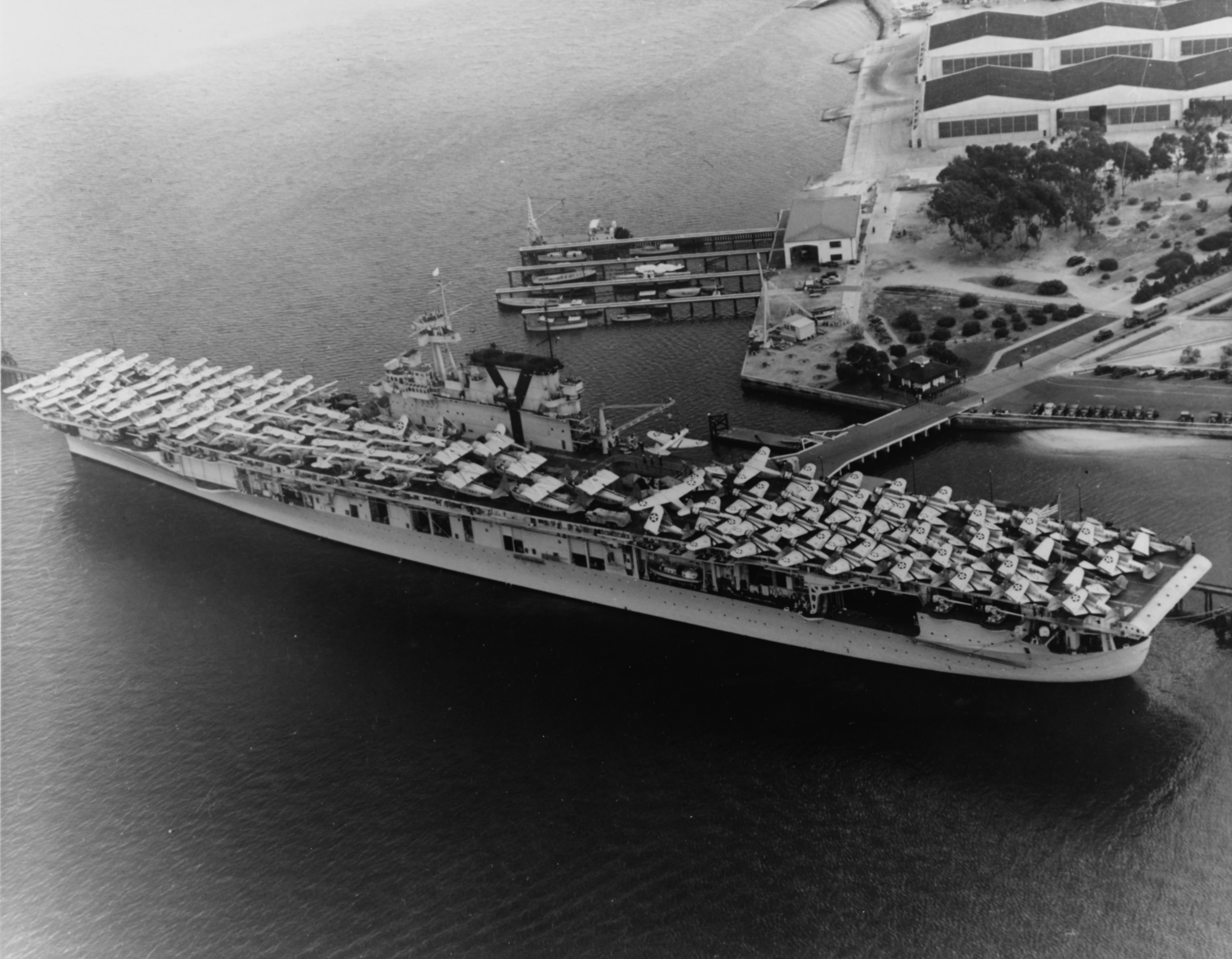
Yorktown prepares to get under way from NAS San Diego (June 1940)

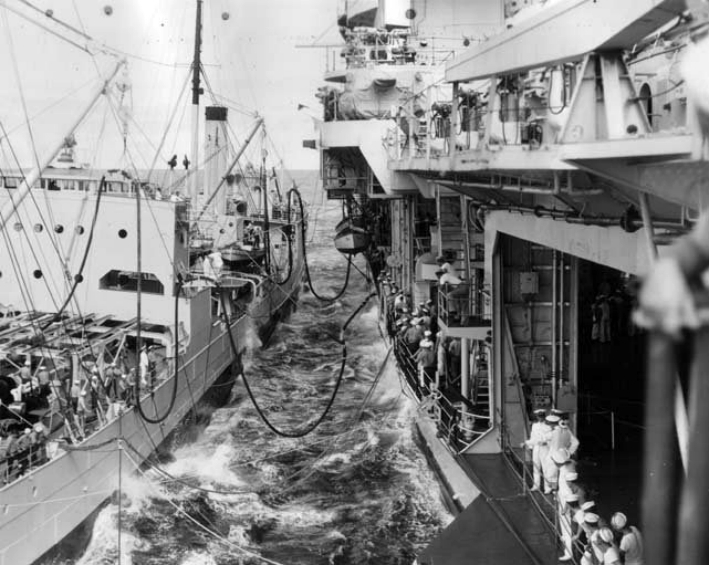
Yorktown is refueled by USS Brazos mid-Pacific (July 1940)

Yorktown departed Pearl Harbor on 20 April 1941 in company with destroyers Warrington, Somers, and Jouett; headed southeast, transited the Panama Canal on the night of 6–7 May, and arrived at Bermuda on 12 May. From that time until the United States entered the war, Yorktown conducted four patrols in the Atlantic, ranging from Newfoundland to Bermuda and logging 17,642 miles (28,392 km) steamed while enforcing American neutrality.

Although Adolf Hitler had forbidden his submarines to attack American ships, the men who manned the American naval vessels were not aware of this policy and operated on a wartime footing in the Atlantic.

On 28 October, while Yorktown, the battleship New Mexico, and other American warships were screening a convoy, a destroyer picked up a submarine contact and dropped depth charges while the convoy itself made an emergency starboard turn, the first of the convoy's three emergency changes of course. Late that afternoon, engine repairs to one of the ships in the convoy, Empire Pintail, reduced the convoy's speed to 11 knots (13 mph; 20 km/h).

During the night, the American ships intercepted strong German radio signals, indicating submarines probably in the vicinity reporting the group. Rear Admiral H. Kent Hewitt, commanding the escort force, sent a destroyer to sweep astern of the convoy to destroy the U-boat or at least to drive him under.

The next day, while cruiser scout planes patrolled overhead, Yorktown and the cruiser Savannah fueled their escorting destroyers, finishing the task as dusk fell. On 30 October, Yorktown was preparing to fuel three destroyers when other escorts made sound contacts. The convoy subsequently made 10 emergency turns while the destroyers Morris and Anderson dropped depth charges, with Hughes assisted in developing the contact. Anderson later made two more depth charge attacks, noticing "considerable oil with slick spreading but no wreckage".

The short-of-war period was becoming more like the real thing as each day went on. Elsewhere on 30 October, U-552 torpedoed the destroyer Reuben James, sinking her with a heavy loss of life, the first loss of an American warship in World War II. After another Neutrality Patrol stint in November, Yorktown put into Norfolk on 2 December.

== World War II ==
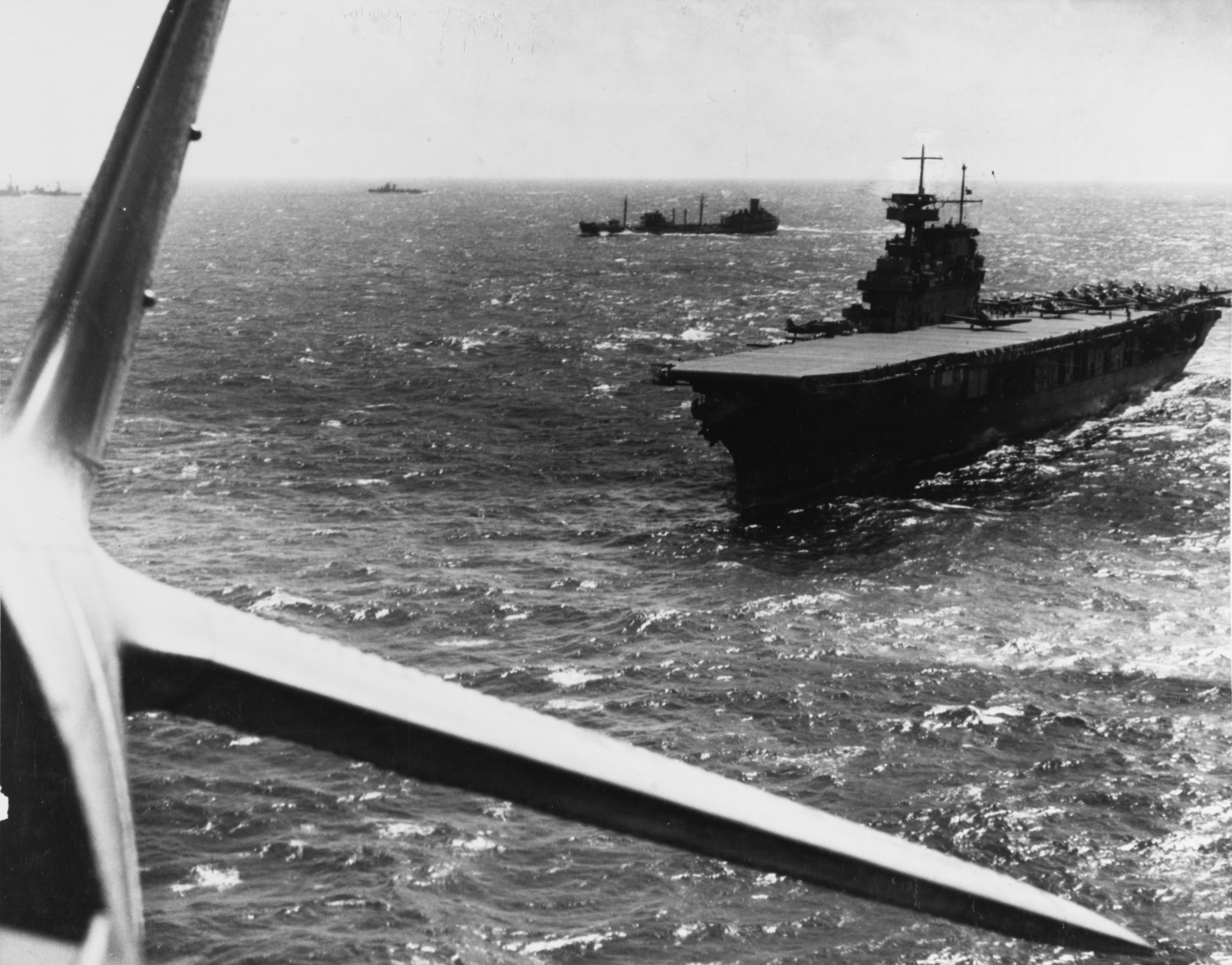
Yorktown in February 1942

On the early morning of 7 December 1941, Japanese warplanes attacked the U.S. base at Pearl Harbor without warning, damaging or sinking 16 U.S. warships. With the battle line crippled, the undamaged American carriers assumed great importance. There were, on 7 December, only three in the Pacific: Enterprise, Lexington, and Saratoga. Yorktown, Ranger, Wasp, and the recently commissioned Hornet were in the Atlantic. The surprise attack on Pearl Harbor resulted in massive outrage across the United States and led to the country's formal entry into World War II the next day. Yorktown departed Norfolk on 16 December for the Pacific, her secondary gun galleries studded with new Oerlikon 20 mm guns. (The ship's Gunnery Officer retained the Browning M2 .50 caliber machine guns the Oerlikons replaced, and acquired a supply of M1919A4 .30 caliber machine guns as well. The crew discovered the pintle mounts of the .30 calibers fitted neatly into cut swab handles, and the swab handles themselves fitted neatly into the hollow pipes used for the ship's safety lines. Dozens of sailors went into the unofficial antiaircraft gun business, and according to one report, "Yorktown bristled with more guns than a Mexican revolution movie.") She reached San Diego 30 December 1941 and soon became flagship for Rear Admiral Frank Fletcher's newly formed Task Force 17 (TF 17).

The carrier's first mission in her new theater was to escort a convoy carrying Marine reinforcements to American Samoa. Departing San Diego on 6 January 1942, Yorktown and her consorts covered the movement of Marines to Pago Pago in Tutuila to augment the garrison already there.

Having safely covered that troop movement, Yorktown, in company with sister ship Enterprise, departed Samoan waters on 25 January. Six days later, Task Force 8 (built around Enterprise), and TF 17 (around Yorktown) parted company. The former headed for the Marshall Islands, the latter for the Gilberts, each to take part in some of the first American offensives of the war, the Marshalls-Gilberts raids.

Yorktown was being screened by two cruisers, Louisville and St. Louis and four destroyers. At 05:17, Yorktown launched 11 Douglas TBD-1 Devastators and 17 Douglas SBD-3 Dauntlesses, under the command of Commander Curtis W. Smiley. Those planes hit what Japanese shore installations and shipping they could find at Jaluit, but severe thunderstorms hampered the mission, and seven planes were lost. Other Yorktown planes attacked Japanese installations and ships at Makin and Mili Atolls.

"Yorktown" in Dictionary of American Naval Fighting Ships
Read by James Christopher for LibriVox
Audio 00:37:41 (full text)

The attack on the Gilberts by Task Force 17 had apparently been a surprise since the American force encountered no enemy surface ships. A single Japanese Kawanishi H6K "Mavis" flying boat attempted to attack American destroyers sent astern in hope of recovering the crews of planes overdue from the Jaluit mission. Antiaircraft fire from the destroyers drove off the intruder before it could cause any damage.

Later, another Mavis, or possibly the same one, came out of low clouds 15,000 yards (14,000 m) distant from Yorktown. The carrier withheld her antiaircraft fire in order not to interfere with the combat air patrol (CAP) fighters. Presently, the Mavis, pursued by two Grumman F4F Wildcats, disappeared behind a cloud. Within five minutes, the enemy patrol plane fell out of the clouds and crashed in the water.

Although TF 17 was slated to make a second attack on Jaluit, it was canceled because of heavy rainstorms and the approach of darkness. Therefore, the Yorktown force retired from the area.

Admiral Chester Nimitz later called the Marshalls-Gilberts raids "well conceived, well planned, and brilliantly executed." The results obtained by Task Forces 8 and 17 were noteworthy, Nimitz continued in his subsequent report, because the task forces had been obliged to make their attacks somewhat blindly, due to lack of hard intelligence data on the Japanese-held islands.

Yorktown subsequently put in at Pearl Harbor for replenishment before she put to sea on 14 February, bound for the Coral Sea. On 6 March, she rendezvoused with TF 11 which had been formed around Lexington and under the command of Vice Admiral Wilson Brown. Together they headed towards Rabaul and Gasmata to attack Japanese shipping there in an effort to check the Japanese advance and to cover the landing of Allied troops at Nouméa, New Caledonia. The two carriers were screened by eight heavy cruisers (including the Australian warships HMAS Australia and HMAS Canberra) and 14 destroyers. As they steamed toward New Guinea, the Japanese continued their advance toward Australia with a landing on 7 March at the Huon Gulf, in the Salamaua-Lae area on the eastern end of New Guinea.

Word of the Japanese operation prompted Admiral Brown to change the objective of TF 11's strike from Rabaul to the Salamaua-Lae sector. On the morning of 10 March 1942, American carriers launched aircraft from the Gulf of Papua. Lexington flew off her air group commencing at 07:49 and, 21 minutes later, Yorktown followed suit. The choice of the gulf as the launch point for the strike meant the planes would have to fly some 125 miles (200 km) across the Owen Stanley mountains, which provided security for the task force and ensured surprise, at the cost of poor flying conditions.

In the attacks that followed, Lexington's Douglas SBD Dauntlesses from Scouting Squadron 2 (VS-2) dive-bombed Japanese ships at Lae at 09:22. The carrier's torpedo and bomber squadrons (VT-2 and VB-2) attacked shipping at Salamaua at 09:38. Her fighters (VF-2) split up into four-plane attack groups: one strafed Lae and the other, Salamaua. Yorktown's planes followed on the heels of those from Lexington. VB-5 and VT-5 attacked Japanese ships in the Salamaua area at 09:50, while VS-5 went after auxiliaries moored close in shore at Lae. The fighters of VF-42 flew CAP over Salamaua until they determined there was no air opposition, then strafed surface objectives and small boats in the harbor.

After carrying out their missions, the American planes returned to their carriers and 103 planes of the 104 launched were back safely on board by noon. One SBD-2 Dauntless had been downed by Japanese antiaircraft fire. The raid on Salamaua and Lae was the first attack by many pilots, and, if accuracy was below that achieved in later actions, the fliers gained invaluable experience which helped in the Battle of the Coral Sea and the Battle of Midway.

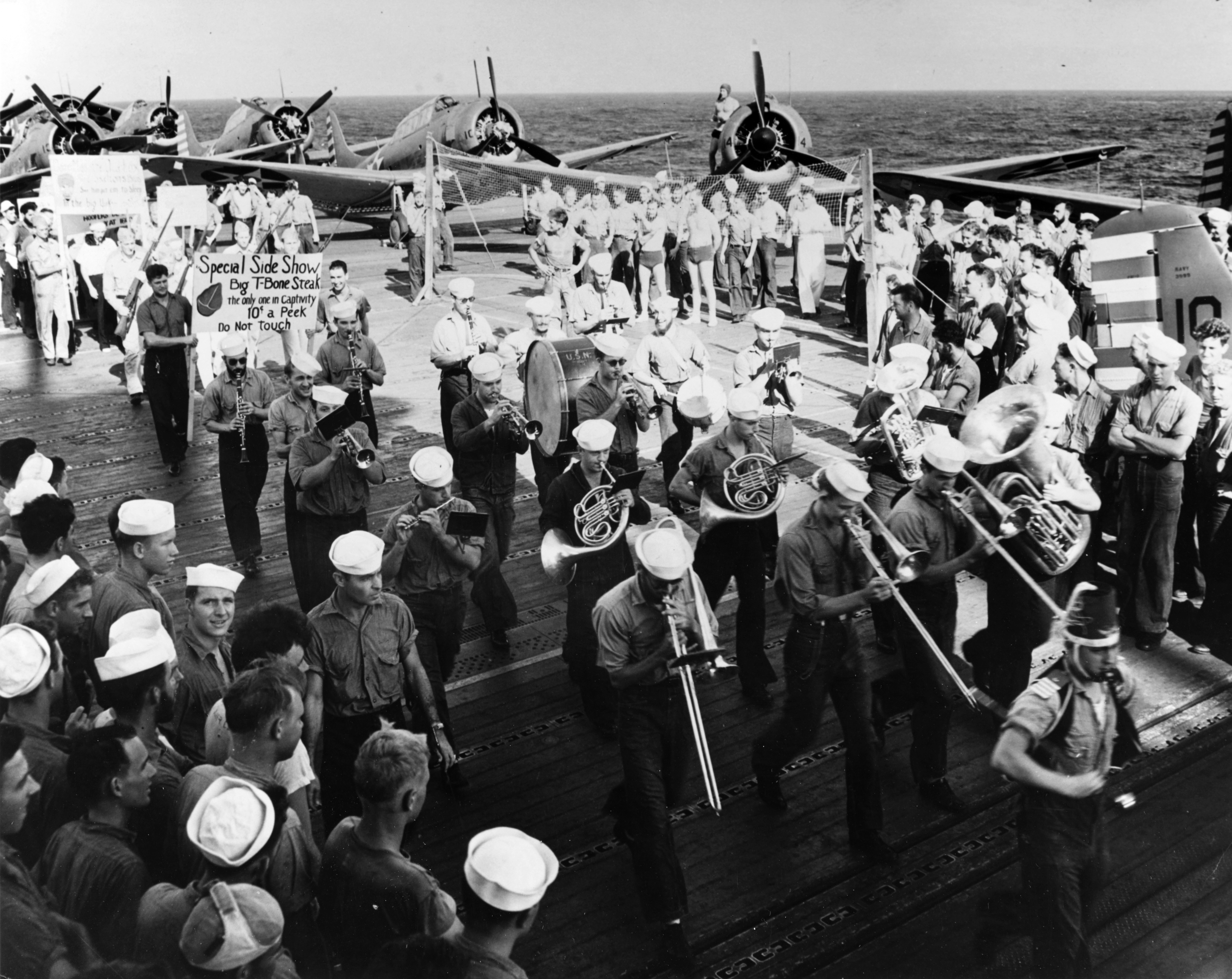
The "Jamboree parade" was a morale-boosting celebration held on 10 April 1942

Task Force 11 retired at 20 knots (37 km/h; 23 mph) on a southeasterly course until dark, when the ships steered eastward at 15 knots (28 km/h; 17 mph) and made rendezvous with Task Group 11.7 (TG11.7), three heavy cruisers (USS Chicago, HMAS Australia, and HMAS Canberra) and four destroyers under the Royal Australian Navy Rear Admiral John Crace, which provided cover for the carriers on their approach to New Guinea.

Prior to the attack it had been intended that, at this point, with the two carriers beyond the range of Japanese air power, they would split up, with Lexington returning immediately to Pearl Harbor for a refit and Yorktown to follow a week or two later, once a replacement vessel could be dispatched to relieve her. However, plans changed: even as the Lae-Salamaua operation was taking place, President Roosevelt was ordering the only possible relief carriers, Enterprise and Hornet, to be diverted to a special operation, the Doolittle Raid on Tokyo. Because of this Yorktown was ordered to remain on station indefinitely, not returning to Pearl until limping home after the Coral Sea battle, having spent a hundred days away from a base.

Yorktown resumed her patrols in the Coral Sea area, remaining at sea into April, out of reach of Japanese land-based aircraft and ready to carry out offensive operations whenever the opportunity presented itself. After the Lae-Salamaua raid, the situation in the South Pacific seemed temporarily stabilized, and Yorktown and her consorts in TF 17 put into the undeveloped harbor at Tongatabu, in the Tonga Islands, for needed upkeep, having been at sea continuously since departing from Pearl Harbor on 14 February.

However, the enemy was soon on the move. To Admiral Nimitz, there seemed to be "excellent indications that the Japanese intended to make a seaborne attack on Port Moresby the first week in May". Yorktown accordingly departed Tongatapu on 27 April, bound once more for the Coral Sea. TF 11—now commanded by Rear Admiral Aubrey W. Fitch, who had relieved Brown in Lexington—departed Pearl Harbor to join Fletcher's TF 17 and arrived in the vicinity of Yorktown's group, southwest of the New Hebrides Islands, on 1 May.

=== Battle of the Coral Sea ===
At 15:17 the next afternoon, two SBD Dauntlesses from VS-5 sighted a Japanese submarine running on the surface. Three TBD Devastators from Yorktown succeeded only in driving the submarine under.

On the morning of 3 May, TF 11 and TF 17 were some 100 miles (161 km) apart, engaged in fueling operations. Shortly before midnight, Fletcher received word from Australian-based aircraft that Japanese transports were disembarking troops and equipment at Tulagi in the Solomon Islands. Arriving soon after the Australians had evacuated the place, the Japanese landed to commence construction of a seaplane base there to support their southward thrust.

Yorktown accordingly set course northward at 27 knots (50 km/h; 31 mph). By daybreak on 4 May, she was within striking distance of the newly established Japanese beachhead and launched her first strike at 07:01―18 F4F-3 Wildcats of VF-42, 12 TBD Devastators of VT-5, and 28 SBD Dauntlesses from VS and VB-5. Yorktown's air group made three consecutive attacks on enemy ships and shore installations at Tulagi and Gavutu on the south coast of Florida Island in the Solomons. Expending 22 torpedoes and 76 1,000-pound (450 kg) bombs in the three attacks, Yorktown's planes sank the destroyer Kikuzuki, three minesweepers and four barges. In addition, Air Group 5 destroyed five enemy seaplanes but lost two F4F Wildcats (the pilots were recovered) and one TBD Devastator (whose crew was lost).

Meanwhile, that same day, TF 44, a cruiser-destroyer force under Rear Admiral Crace (RN), joined Lexington's TF 11, thus completing the composition of the Allied force on the eve of the crucial Battle of the Coral Sea.

Elsewhere, to the northward, eleven troop-laden transports—escorted by destroyers and covered by the light carrier Shōhō, four heavy cruisers, and a destroyer—steamed toward Port Moresby. In addition, another Japanese task force—formed around the two Pearl Harbor veterans, carriers Shōkaku and Zuikaku, and screened by two heavy cruisers and six destroyers—provided additional air cover.

On the morning of 6 May, Fletcher gathered all Allied forces under his tactical command as TF 17. At daybreak on 7 May, he dispatched Crace, with the cruisers and destroyers under his command, toward the Louisiade archipelago to intercept any enemy attempt to move toward Port Moresby.

While Fletcher moved north with his two flattops and their screens in search of the enemy, Japanese search planes located the oil tanker Neosho and her escorting destroyer, Sims and misidentified the former as a carrier. Two waves of Japanese planes—first high-level bombers and then dive bombers—attacked the two ships. Sims, her antiaircraft battery crippled by gun failures, took three direct hits and sank quickly with a heavy loss of life. Neosho was more fortunate in that, even after seven direct hits and eight near-misses, she remained afloat until, on 11 May, her survivors were picked up by Henley and her hulk sunk by the rescuing destroyer.

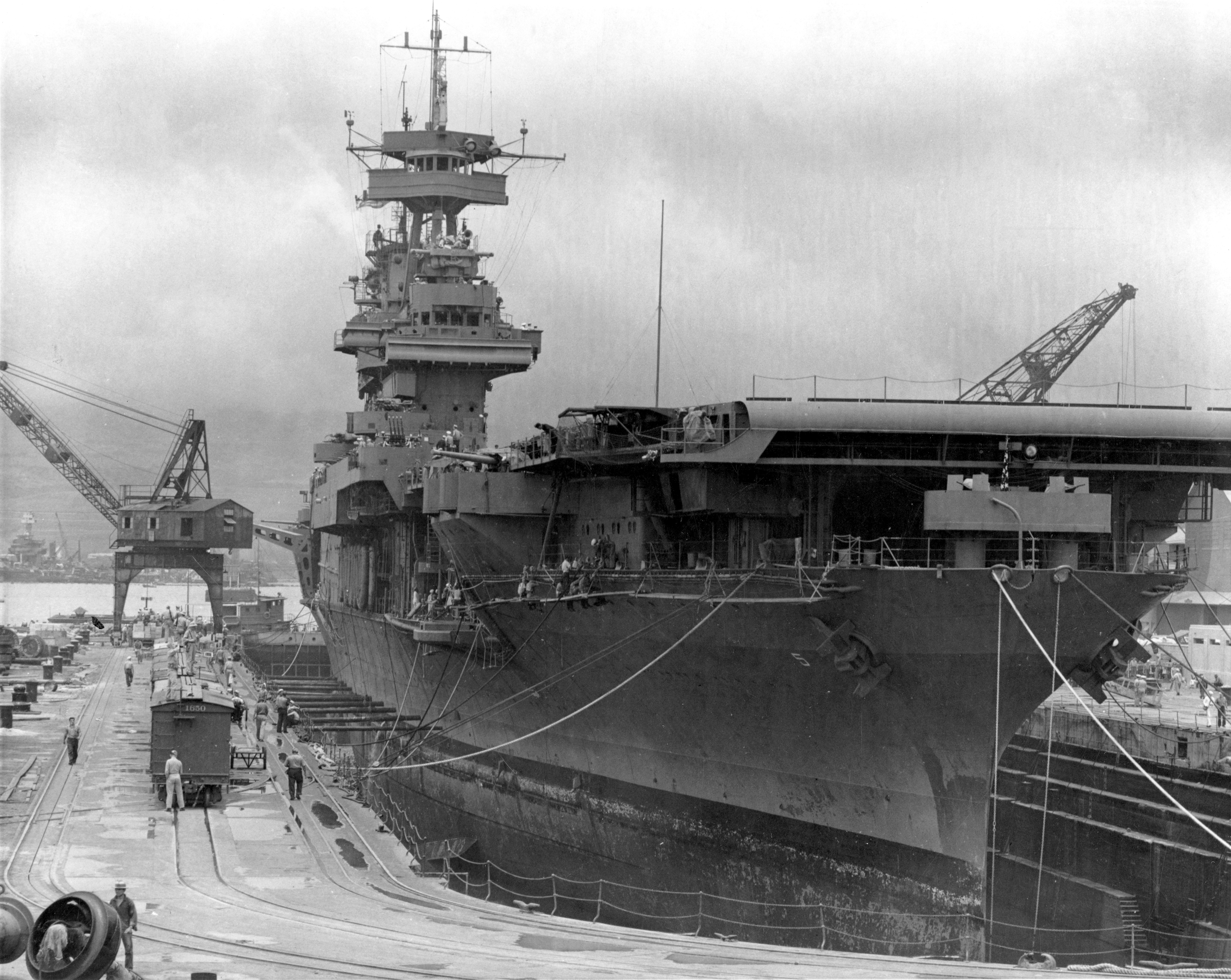
Yorktown in drydock at Pearl Harbor on 29 May 1942, shortly before departing for Midway

Neosho and Sims had performed a valuable service, drawing off the planes that might otherwise have hit Fletcher's carriers. Meanwhile, Yorktown and Lexington's planes found Shōhō and sank her. One of Lexington's pilots reported this victory with the radio message, "Scratch one flattop".

That afternoon, Shōkaku and Zuikaku, still not located by Fletcher's forces, launched 27 bombers and torpedo planes to search for the American ships. Their flight proved uneventful until they ran into fighters from Yorktown and Lexington, which proceeded to down nine enemy planes in the ensuing dogfight.

Near twilight, three Japanese planes incredibly mistook Yorktown for their own carrier and attempted to land. The ship's gunfire, though, drove them off, and the enemy planes crossed Yorktown's bow and turned away out of range. Twenty minutes later, when three more enemy pilots made the mistake of trying to get into Yorktown's landing circle, the carrier's gunners splashed one of the trio.

However, the battle was far from over. The next morning, 8 May, a Lexington search plane spotted Admiral Takeo Takagi's carrier striking force—including Zuikaku and Shōkaku. Yorktown planes scored two bomb hits on Shōkaku, damaging her flight deck and preventing her from launching aircraft. In addition, the bombs set off explosions in gasoline storage tanks and destroyed an engine repair workshop. Lexington's Dauntlesses added another hit. Between the two American air groups, the hits killed 108 Japanese sailors and wounded 40 more.

While the American aircraft were attacking the Japanese flattops, Yorktown and Lexington had been alerted by an intercepted message that indicated that the Japanese knew of their whereabouts and prepared to fight off a retaliatory strike, which came shortly after 11:00.

American Combat Air Patrol F4F Wildcats downed 17 aircraft, although some still got through the defenses. Nakajima B5N "Kates" launched torpedoes from both sides of Lexington's bow, achieving two hits on the port side while Aichi D3A "Val" dive bombers managed three bomb hits. Lexington began to list from three partially flooded engineering spaces. Several fires raged below decks, and the carrier's elevators were put out of commission.

Meanwhile, Yorktown was having problems of her own. Skillfully maneuvered by her commander, Captain Elliott Buckmaster, the carrier dodged eight torpedoes. Attacked by "Val" dive-bombers, the ship managed to evade all but one bomb. At 11:27, Yorktown was hit in the center of her flight deck by a single 250 kg (550 lb), semi-armor-piercing bomb which penetrated four decks before exploding, causing severe structural damage to an aviation storage room and killing or seriously wounding 66 men, as well as damaging the superheater boilers which rendered them inoperable. Up to 12 near misses damaged Yorktown's hull below the waterline.

Lexington's damage control parties brought the fires under control, and the ship was still able to continue flight operations despite the damage. The air battle itself ended shortly before noon on the 8th; within an hour, the carrier was on an even keel, although slightly down by the bow. However, an explosion caused by the ignition of gasoline vapors later caused a fire and tore apart her interior. Lexington was abandoned at 17:07, and later sunk by the destroyer Phelps.

The Japanese had won a tactical victory, inflicting comparatively heavier losses on the Allied force, but the Allies, in stemming the tide of Japan's conquests in the South and Southwest Pacific, had achieved a strategic victory. Yorktown had not achieved her part in the victory without cost, and had suffered enough damage to cause experts to estimate that at least three months in a yard would be required to put her back in fighting trim. However, there was little time for repairs, because U.S. naval intelligence had gained enough information from decoded Japanese naval messages to estimate that the Japanese were on the threshold of a major operation aimed at the northwestern tip of the Hawaiian chain. These were two islets in a low coral atoll known as Midway Island.

=== Battle of Midway ===
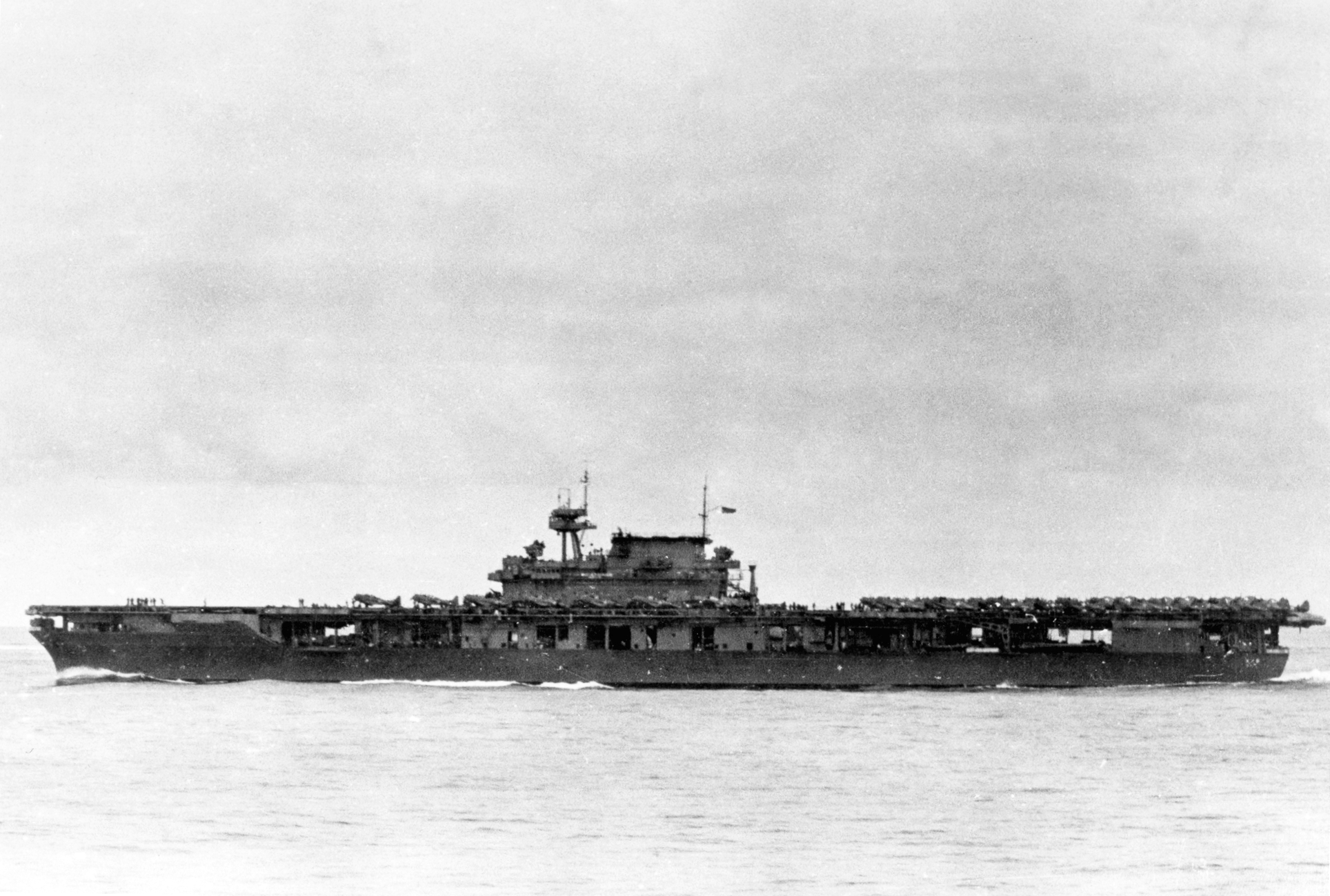
Yorktown on the morning of 4 June 1942

Armed with this intelligence, Admiral Nimitz began methodically planning Midway's defense, rushing all possible reinforcement in the way of men, planes and guns to Midway. In addition, he began gathering his comparatively meager naval forces to meet the enemy at sea. As part of those preparations, he recalled TF 16, Enterprise and Hornet to Pearl Harbor for a quick replenishment.

Yorktown, too, received orders to return to Hawaii; she arrived at Pearl Harbor on 27 May, entering dry dock the following day. The damage the ship had sustained after Coral Sea was considerable, and led to the Navy Yard inspectors estimating that she would need at least two weeks of repairs. However, Admiral Nimitz ordered that she be made ready to sail alongside TF 16. Further inspections showed that Yorktown's flight elevators had not been damaged, and the damage to her flight deck and hull could be patched easily. Yard workers at Pearl Harbor, laboring around the clock, made enough repairs to enable the ship to put to sea again in 48 hours. The repairs were made in such a short time that the Japanese Naval Air Commanders would mistake Yorktown for another carrier as they thought she had been sunk during the previous battle. However, one critical repair to her power plant was not made: her damaged superheater boilers were not touched, limiting her top speed. Her air group was augmented by planes and crews from Saratoga which was then headed for Pearl Harbor after her refit on the West Coast. Yorktown sailed as the core of TF 17 on 30 May.

Northeast of Midway, Yorktown, flying Vice Admiral Fletcher's flag, rendezvoused with TF 16 under Rear Admiral Raymond A. Spruance and maintained a position 10 miles (16 km) to the northward of him.

Patrols, both from Midway and the carriers, were flown during early June. At dawn on 4 June Yorktown launched a 10-plane group of Dauntlesses from VB-5 which searched a northern semicircle for a distance of 100 miles (160 km) out but found nothing.

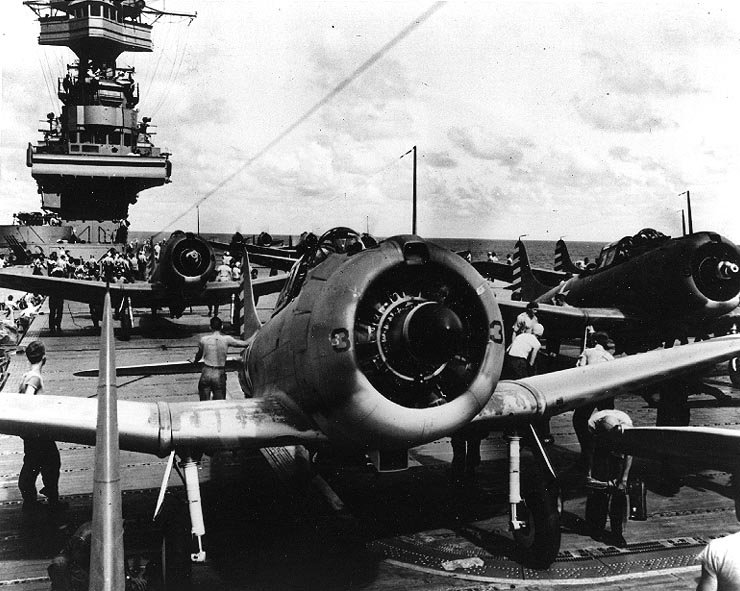
Yorktown's SBD Dauntless dive bombers played a crucial role in the Battle of Midway

Meanwhile, PBYs flying from Midway had sighted the approaching Japanese and broadcast the alarm for the American forces defending the key atoll. Admiral Fletcher, in tactical command, ordered Admiral Spruance's TF 16 to locate and strike the enemy carrier force.

Yorktown's search group returned at 08:30, landing soon after the last of the six-plane CAP had left the deck. When the last of the Dauntlesses were recovered, the deck was hastily respotted for the launch of the ship's attack group: 17 Dauntlesses from VB-3, 12 Devastators from VT-3, and six Wildcats from "Fighting Three". Enterprise and Hornet, meanwhile, launched their attack groups.

The torpedo planes from the three American carriers located the Japanese striking force, but met disaster. Of the 41 planes from VT-8, VT-6, and VT-3, only six returned to Enterprise and Yorktown; none made it back to Hornet.

As a reaction to the torpedo attack the Japanese CAP had broken off their high-altitude cover for their carriers and had concentrated on the Devastators, flying "on the deck", allowing Dauntlesses from Yorktown and Enterprise to arrive unopposed.

Virtually unopposed, Yorktown's dive-bombers attacked Sōryū, making three lethal hits with 1,000 pounds (450 kg) bombs and setting her on fire. Enterprise's planes, meanwhile, hit Akagi and Kaga, effectively destroying them. The bombs from the Dauntlesses caught all of the Japanese carriers in the midst of refueling and rearming operations, causing devastating fires and explosions.

Three of the four Japanese carriers had been left burning wrecks. The fourth, Hiryū, separated from her sisters, launched a striking force of 18 "Vals" and soon located Yorktown.

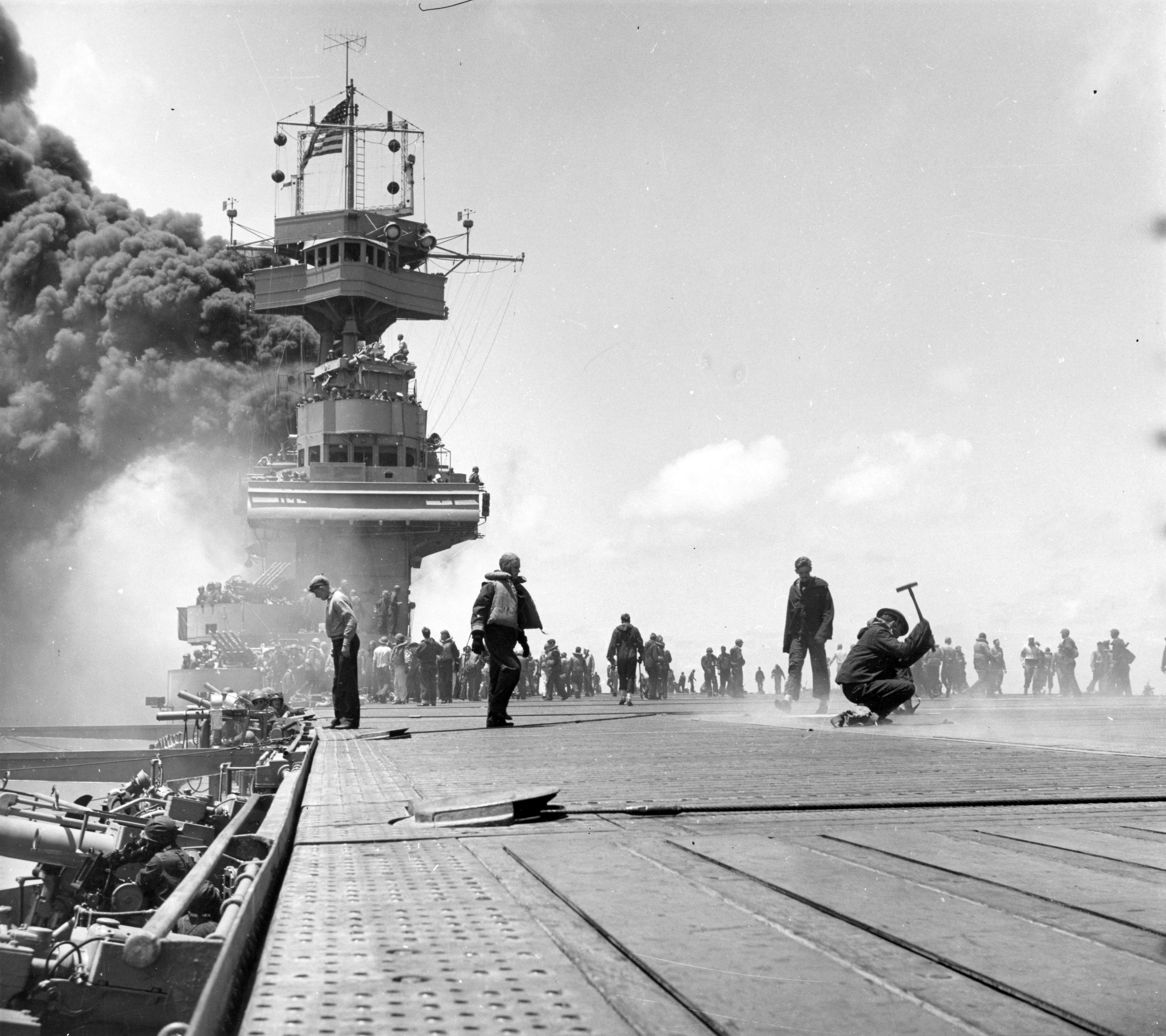
Smoke pours from Yorktown after being hit in the boilers by Japanese dive bombers at Midway

As soon as the attackers had been picked up on Yorktown's radar at about 13:29, she discontinued fueling her CAP fighters on deck and swiftly cleared for action. Her returning dive bombers were moved from the landing circle to open the area for antiaircraft fire. The Dauntlesses were ordered aloft to form a CAP. An auxiliary 800-US-gallon (3,000 L) gasoline tank was pushed over the carrier's fantail, eliminating one fire hazard. The crew drained fuel lines and closed and secured all compartments.

All of Yorktown's fighters were vectored out to intercept the oncoming Japanese aircraft at a distance of 15 to 20 miles (24 to 32 km) out. The Wildcats attacked vigorously, breaking up what appeared to be an organized attack by some 18 "Vals" and 6 "Zeroes". "Planes were flying in every direction", wrote Captain Buckmaster after the action, "and many were falling in flames." The leader of the "Vals", Lieutenant Michio Kobayashi, was probably shot down by the VF-3's commanding officer, Lieutenant Commander John S. Thach. Lieutenant William W. Barnes also pressed home the first attack, possibly taking out the lead bomber and damaging at least two others.

Despite an intensive barrage and evasive maneuvering, three "Vals" scored hits. Two of them were shot down soon after releasing their bomb loads; the third went out of control just as his bomb left the rack. It tumbled in flight and hit just abaft the number two elevator on the starboard side, exploding on contact and blasting a hole about 10 feet (3 m) square in the flight deck. Splinters from the exploding bomb killed most of the crews of the two 1.1-inch (28 mm) gun mounts aft of the island and on the flight deck below. Fragments piercing the flight deck hit three planes on the hangar deck, starting fires. One of the aircraft, a Yorktown Dauntless, was fully fueled and carrying a 1,000 pounds (450 kg) bomb. Prompt action by LT A. C. Emerson, the hangar deck officer, prevented a serious fire by activating the sprinkler system and quickly extinguishing the fire.

The second bomb to hit the ship came from the port side, pierced the flight deck, and exploded in the lower part of the funnel, in effect a classic "down the stack shot." It ruptured the uptakes for three boilers, disabled two boilers, and extinguished the fires in five boilers. Smoke and gases began filling the firerooms of six boilers. The men at Number One boiler remained at their post and kept it alight, maintaining enough steam pressure to allow the auxiliary steam systems to function.

A third bomb hit the carrier from the starboard side, pierced the side of number one elevator and exploded on the fourth deck, starting a persistent fire in the rag storage space, adjacent to the forward gasoline stowage and the magazines. The prior precaution of smothering the gasoline system with carbon dioxide undoubtedly prevented the gasoline from igniting.

While the ship recovered from the damage inflicted by the dive-bombing attack, her speed dropped to 6 knots (11 km/h; 6.9 mph); and then at 14:40, about 20 minutes after the bomb hit that had shut down most of the boilers, Yorktown slowed to a stop, dead in the water.

At about 15:40, Yorktown prepared to get underway; and, at 15:50, thanks to the black gang in No. 1 Fireroom having kept the auxiliaries operating to clear the stack gas from the other firerooms and bleeding steam from No. 1 to the other boilers to jump-start them, Chief Engineer Delaney reported to Captain Buckmaster that the ship's engineers were ready to make 20 knots (37 km/h; 23 mph) or better. Yorktown yanked down her yellow breakdown flag and up went a new hoist-"My speed 5." Captain Buckmaster had his signalmen hoist a huge new (10 feet wide and 15 feet long) American flag from the foremast. Sailors, including Ensign John d'Arc Lorenz called it an incalculable inspiration: "For the first time I realized what the flag meant: all of us — a million faces — all our effort — a whisper of encouragement." Damage control parties were able to temporarily patch the flight deck and restore power to several boilers within an hour, giving her a speed of 19 knots (35 km/h; 22 mph) and enabling her to resume air operations.

Simultaneously, with the fires controlled sufficiently to warrant the resumption of fueling, Yorktown began refueling the fighters then on deck; just then the ship's radar picked up an incoming air group at a distance of 33 miles (53 km). While the ship prepared for battle, again smothering gasoline systems and stopping the fueling of the planes on her flight deck, she vectored four of the six fighters of the CAP in the air to intercept the raiders. Of the 10 fighters on board, eight had as little as 23 US gallons (87 L) of fuel in their tanks. They were launched as the remaining pair of fighters of the CAP headed out to intercept the Japanese planes.

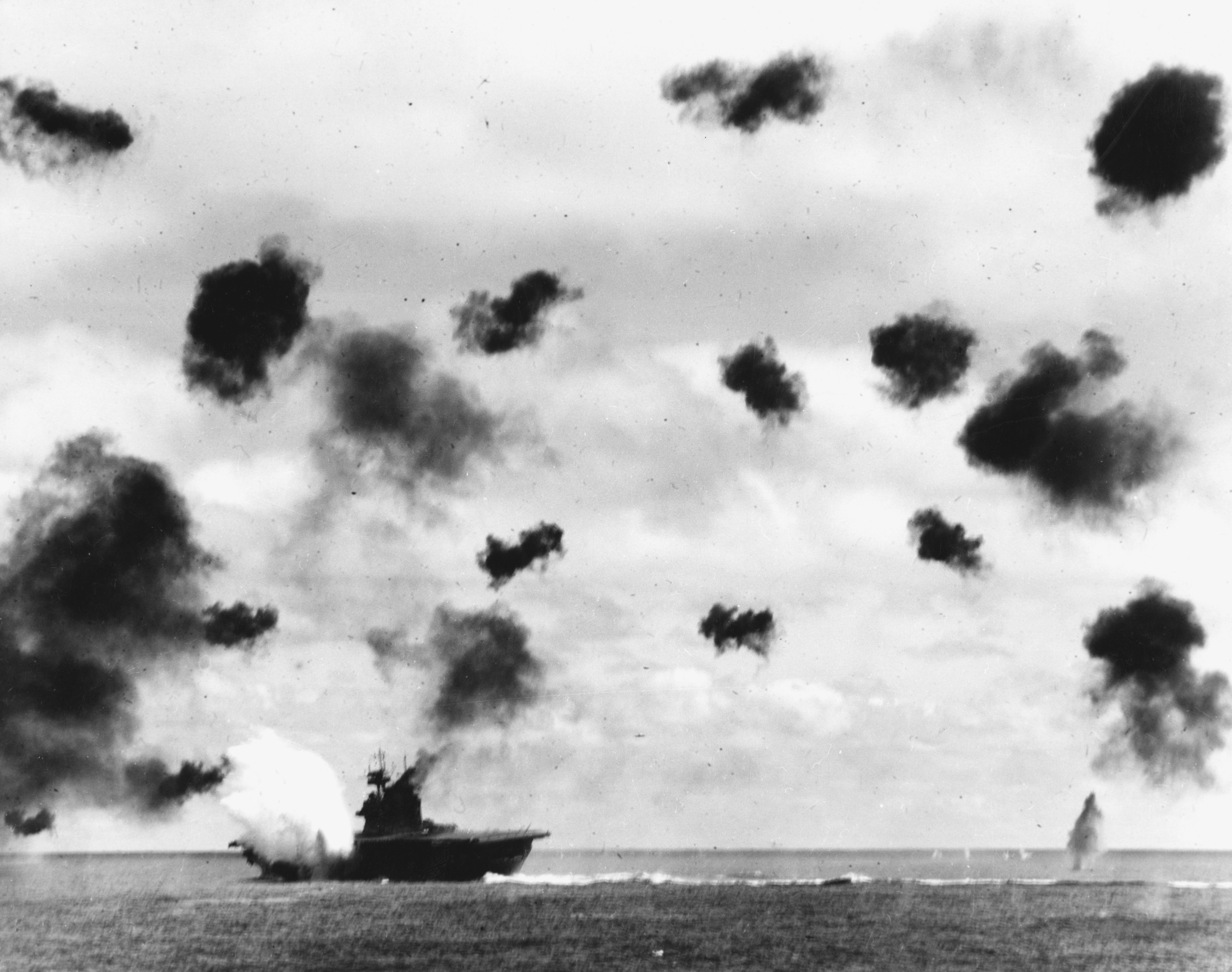
Yorktown is hit on the port side, amidships, by a Type 91 aerial torpedo during the mid-afternoon attack by planes from the carrier Hiryu.

At 16:00, maneuvering Yorktown churned forward, making 20 knots. The fighters she had launched and vectored out to intercept had meanwhile made contact with the enemy. Yorktown received reports that the planes were "Kates". The Wildcats shot down at least three, but the rest began their approach while the carrier and her escorts mounted a heavy antiaircraft barrage.

Yorktown maneuvered radically, avoiding at least two torpedoes before another two struck the port side within minutes of each other, the first at 16:20. The carrier had been mortally wounded; she lost power and went dead in the water with a jammed rudder and an increasing list to port.

As the ship's list progressed, Commander Clarence E. Aldrich, the damage control officer, reported from central station that, without power, controlling the flooding looked impossible. The Chief Engineer, Lieutenant Commander John F. Delaney, soon reported that all boiler fires were out, all power was lost, and that it was impossible to correct the list. Buckmaster ordered Aldrich, Delaney, and their men to secure the fire and engine rooms and lay up to the weather decks to put on life jackets.

The list, meanwhile, continued to increase. When it reached 26 degrees, Buckmaster and Aldrich agreed that capsizing was imminent. "In order to save as many of the ship's company as possible", the captain wrote later, he "ordered the ship to be abandoned".

Over the next few minutes the crew lowered the wounded into life rafts and struck out for the nearby destroyers and cruisers to be picked up by their boats, abandoning ship in good order. After the evacuation of all wounded, the executive officer, Commander Dixie Kiefer left the ship down a line on the starboard side. Buckmaster, meanwhile, toured the ship one last time, to see if any men remained. After finding no "live personnel", Buckmaster lowered himself into the water by means of a line over the stern, by which time water was lapping the port side of the hangar deck.

=== Salvage and sinking ===
After being picked up by the destroyer USS Hammann, Buckmaster transferred to the cruiser Astoria and reported to Vice Admiral Fletcher, who had shifted his flag to the heavy cruiser after the first dive-bombing attack. The two men agreed that a salvage party should attempt to save the ship since she had stubbornly remained afloat despite the heavy list and imminent danger of capsizing.

While efforts to save Yorktown had been proceeding apace, her planes were still in action, joining those from Enterprise in striking the last Japanese carrier—Hiryū—late that afternoon. Taking four direct hits, the Japanese carrier was soon helpless. She was abandoned by her crew and left to drift out of control.

Yorktown, as it turned out, floated throughout the night. Two men were still alive on board her; one attracted attention by firing a machine gun, heard by the sole attending destroyer, Hughes. The escort picked up the men, one of whom later died. Buckmaster selected Executive Officer Dixie Kiefer commander of the salvage crew which also included 29 officers and 141 men to return to the ship in an attempt to save her. Five destroyers formed an antisubmarine screen while the salvage party boarded the listing carrier on the morning of 6 June. The fleet tug USS Vireo, summoned from Pearl and Hermes Reef, commenced towing the ship, although progress was painfully slow.

Yorktown's repair party went on board with a carefully predetermined plan of action to be carried out by men from each department—damage control, gunnery air engineering, navigation, communication, supply and medical. To assist in the work, Lieutenant Commander Arnold E. True brought Hammann alongside to starboard, aft, furnishing pumps and electric power.

By mid-afternoon, the process of reducing topside weight was proceeding well; one 5-inch (127 mm) gun had been dropped over the side and a second was ready to be cast loose, planes had been pushed over the side, and a large quantity of water had been pumped out of engineering spaces. These efforts reduced the list by about two degrees.

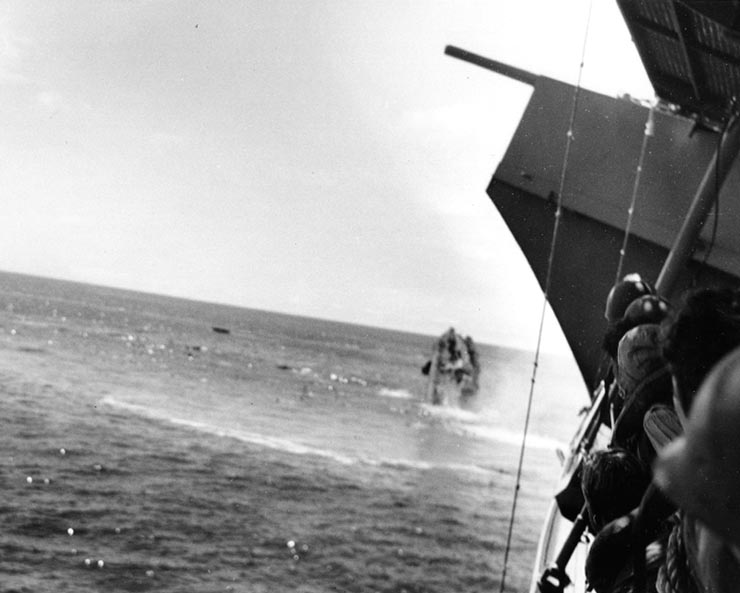
USS Hammann sinking with stern high, after being torpedoed by the Japanese submarine I-168

Unknown to Yorktown and the six nearby destroyers, however, Japanese submarine I-168 had discovered the disabled carrier and achieved a favorable firing position. The I-boat eluded detection—possibly due to the large amount of debris and wreckage in the water—until 15:36, when lookouts spotted a salvo of four torpedoes approaching the ship from the starboard beam.

Hammann went to general quarters, with a 20-millimeter gun going into action in an attempt to explode the torpedoes in the water as she tried to get underway. One torpedo hit Hammann directly amidships and broke her back. The destroyer jackknifed and went down rapidly. Two torpedoes struck Yorktown at the turn of the bilge at the after end of the island structure. The fourth torpedo passed astern of the carrier.

About a minute after Hammann sank there was an underwater explosion, possibly caused by the destroyer's depth charges going off. The concussion killed many of Hammann's and a few of Yorktown's men who had been thrown into the water, battered the damaged carrier's hull, dislodged Yorktown's auxiliary generator and numerous fixtures from the hangar deck, sheared rivets in the starboard leg of the foremast, and injured several onboard crew members. The remaining destroyers initiated a search for the enemy submarine (which escaped), and commenced rescue operations for Hammann survivors and the Yorktown salvage crew. Vireo cut the tow and doubled back to assist in rescue efforts.

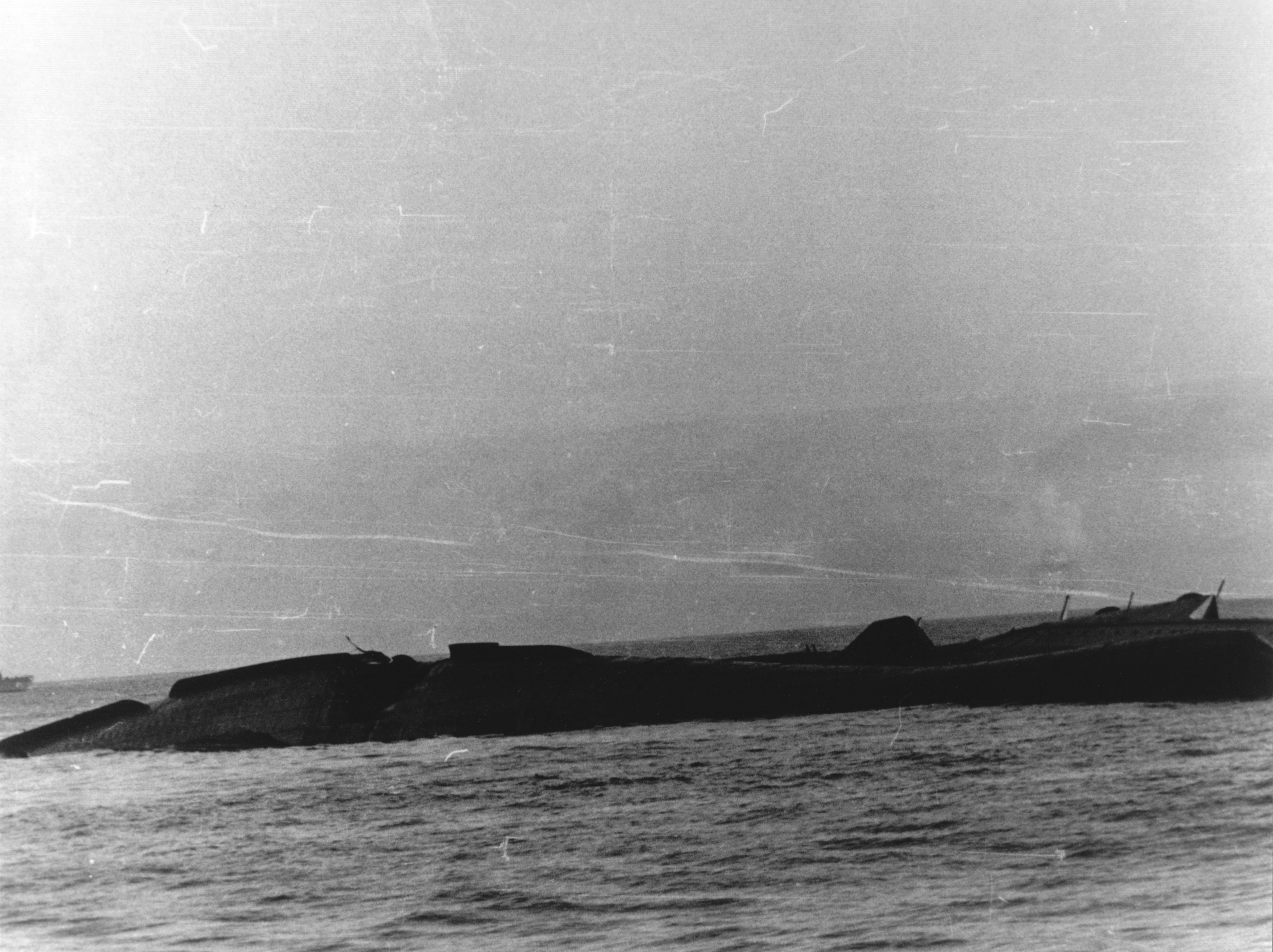
Yorktown capsizing to port and sinking, 7 June 1942

Throughout the night of 6 June and into the morning of 7 June, Yorktown remained afloat; but by 05:30 on 7 June, observers noted that her list was rapidly increasing to port. Shortly afterwards, the ship turned over onto her port side, and lay afloat for several minutes, revealing the torpedo hole in her starboard bilge- the result of the submarine attack. Captain Buckmaster's American flag was still flying. All ships half-masted their colors in salute; all hands who were topside with heads uncovered came to attention, with tears in their eyes. Two patrolling PBYs appeared overhead and dipped their wings in a final salute. At 07:01, the ship rolled upside-down, and slowly sank, stern first, in 3,000 fathoms (5,500 m) of water with her battle flags flying. To most who witnessed the sinking, the Yorktown went quietly and with enormous dignity- "like the great lady she was," as one of them put it. In total 141 of Yorktown's officers and crewmen were killed during the sinking.

== Wreck ==
On 19 May 1998, the wreck of Yorktown was found and photographed by oceanographer Dr. Robert Ballard, discoverer of the wrecks of the RMS Titanic and the German battleship Bismarck. The wreck of Yorktown, 3 miles (5 km) deep, was sitting upright in excellent condition. Despite spending 56 years on the deep-sea floor, much of her paint and equipment were still visible. A more extensive survey of the wreck was conducted by EV Nautilus in September 2023. During a livestreamed exploration of the wreck via remotely operated underwater vehicle on 19 and 20 April 2025 by NOAA Ocean Exploration, a car, suspected to be a 1941 Ford Super Deluxe Station Wagon ("Woodie"), could be seen within the ship's hangar along with at least three SBD Dauntless dive-bombers. The ROV also found intact murals on the ship's walls.

The wreck is within Papahānaumokuākea Marine National Monument.

== Honors and legacy ==
Yorktown (CV-5) earned three battle stars for her World War II service, two of them for the significant part she had played in stopping Japanese expansion and turning the tide of the war at Coral Sea and at Midway. CV-10, the second vessel of the Essex class of aircraft carriers, which was under construction as USS Bonhomme Richard when Yorktown was lost, was renamed Yorktown in honor of her loss at Midway, and was preserved after decommissioning in 1970 to become a museum ship in 1975.

=== Awards and decorations ===

American Defense Service Medal with "A" Device
| American Campaign Medal | Asiatic-Pacific Campaign Medal with 3 stars | World War II Victory Medal |

== See also ==
- List of United States Navy losses in World War II
