= Bruno Gaido =

American Aviation Machinist (1916–1942)

- Born: Bruno Peter Gaido; March 21, 1916; Staunton, Illinois, U.S.
- Died: June 15, 1942 (aged 26); Pacific Ocean near Midway
- Burial place: Courts of the Missing, National Memorial Cemetery of the Pacific
- Military career
- Allegiance: United States
- Branch: United States Navy
- Service years: 1940–1942
- Rank: Aviation Machinist's Mate first class
- Unit: VS-6
- Conflicts: World War II; Pacific War; American carrier raids of 1942; Battle of Midway †
- Awards: Distinguished Flying Cross; Purple Heart

Bruno Peter Gaido (March 21, 1916 – June 15, 1942) was an American sailor who served in the United States Navy as an Aviation Machinist's Mate during World War II. While flying as a gunner for pilot Frank O'Flaherty in a Douglas SBD Dauntless during the Battle of Midway, he was shot down and captured by the Japanese while waiting for rescue from American forces. Gaido, along with O’Flaherty were taken P.O.W. and subsequently tortured, interrogated and executed by being thrown overboard.

== Early life ==
Gaido was born March 21, 1916, in Staunton, Illinois, the fourth of seven children to Clementina Gaido, a stay at home mother, and John Gaido, a laborer and later the owner of a pub. In the 1920s, the family moved from Staunton to Milwaukee, Wisconsin, where Gaido attended Lincoln High School, graduating in 1934. He then sought to enlist in the Navy, but his father considered him too young, so Gaido found work on a Milwaukee County-run farm. In 1940, he joined the Navy with his father's blessing.

== Naval career ==
Gaido enlisted in the Navy on October 11, 1940, as an apprentice seaman. After completing his basic training at the Naval Training Center in Great Lakes, he was assigned to Naval Station Pearl Harbor. On July 15, 1941, Gaido joined air squadron VS-6, which flew Douglas SBD Dauntless dive bombers. After what was originally supposed to be a temporary training assignment, he joined VS-6 permanently as an Aviation Machinist. VS-6 was attached to the aircraft carrier USS Enterprise.

Gaido quickly gained a reputation among the crew of the Enterprise for mental and physical fortitude. In June 1941, Lieutenant Junior Grade Norman Jack "Dusty" Kleiss got into his SBD Dauntless to attempt his first ever takeoff and landing from a carrier, an exercise with high risk to those in the plane. Despite expecting to fly solo, Kleiss found Gaido in the gunner's seat. Kleiss attempted to convince Gaido to leave the aircraft for his safety, but Gaido refused, stating, "You got wings, don't you?" Kleiss would later credit Gaido's confidence with helping him complete several perfect takeoffs and landings from the carrier.

=== Carrier raids of 1942 ===
After the attack on Pearl Harbor on December 7, 1941 and American entry into the Second World War, Enterprise was tasked with harassing and disrupting the Japanese offensive throughout the Pacific Theatre as part of the American carrier raids of 1942. On February 1, 1942, following a bombing raid on the Marshall Islands, the Enterprise came under attack by five Japanese Mitsubishi G3M bombers. The lead aircraft, led by Lieutenant Kazuo Nakai, was badly damaged by a defending F4F Wildcat fighter and turned back towards the Enterprise, attempting to ram it. Seeing this, Gaido abandoned his watch post and jumped into a nearby Dauntless parked on the flight deck, and returned fire using the rear-facing .30 caliber machine guns. His fire disabled the aircraft, causing it to narrowly miss the Enterprise, only hitting parked aircraft—including the one Gaido was in—before spiraling into the sea. Afterwards, Gaido was said to have calmly grabbed the SBD's fire extinguisher and used it to extinguish the burning pool of fuel left by the Japanese plane before disappearing into the ship, as he believed he would be in trouble for abandoning his battle station. However, upon seeing Gaido's heroics, Vice Admiral William Halsey Jr. demanded Gaido be brought to him. A search party found Gaido and brought him to the bridge, where Halsey spot-promoted him from Aviation Machinist's Mate Third Class to Aviation Machinist's Mate First Class. For his actions, he also received a commendation from Secretary of the Navy Frank Knox. He further served with distinction in the carrier raids of Marcus and Wake island in February and March 1942.

=== Battle of Midway ===
Gaido was an SBD Dauntless gunner in the Battle of Midway with pilot Frank O'Flaherty. On June 4, 1942, O'Flaherty and Gaido attacked the Japanese aircraft carrier Kaga alongside the rest of VS-6 and scored a near miss. O'Flaherty and Gaido joined with five other SBDs on the flight back to the Enterprise. On the return journey, six Japanese Mitsubishi A6M Zero fighters from the Japanese aircraft carrier Hiryū's air group, en route as escorts for Aichi D3A dive bombers attacking the USS Yorktown (CV-5), broke off to engage the SBDs. In the subsequent dogfight, two Zeros were badly damaged, and no SBDs were shot down. However, O'Flaherty and Gaido's plane developed a fuel leak, due to damage from either a Zero or anti-aircraft fire during their bombing run. Their Dauntless ran out of fuel and they were forced to ditch. The airmen were picked up by the Japanese destroyer Makigumo, who took them as prisoners of war. The Japanese claimed that Gaido revealed details about Midway Island's defenses; however, he had never been to Midway Island and it is unlikely he would have had any knowledge outside of what was known to the general public. Rear Admiral Samuel J. Cox, the director of the Naval History and Heritage Command, has stated his belief that Gaido gave the Japanese plausible-sounding but fabricated information under torture.

=== Death ===
On June 15, 1942, the Makigumo received orders to execute Gaido and O'Flaherty. According to Japanese accounts, when Makigumo's officer in charge, Isamu Fujita, asked for volunteers to execute the prisoners, the crew initially refused. However, that night the American airmen were weighted and thrown overboard from the Makigumo to drown. The U.S. would not know of the airmen's fate until after the war, and Gaido was listed as missing in action from the Battle of Midway until Japanese records concerning O'Flaherty and Gaido's execution were uncovered after the war. After Gaido was reported missing, his mother Clementina was said to be inconsolable, and her death less than two months later was attributed by some in the family to the stress she experienced from Bruno's presumed death.

== Legacy ==
In April 1943, Gaido was posthumously awarded the Distinguished Flying Cross for his actions aboard the Enterprise. In 1996, Gaido was the first inductee into the Enlisted Combat Aircrew Roll of Honor. Gaido is memorialized on the Courts of the Missing at the National Memorial Cemetery of the Pacific.

=== In popular culture ===
Gaido was portrayed by Nick Jonas in the 2019 film Midway. Jonas portrayed Gaido with a mustache and a New York accent, under the mistaken impression that Gaido was from Long Island. Despite this, Gaido's surviving family were reportedly happy with Jonas' portrayal. Gaido's actions during the Marshall Islands raid and Midway were also featured prominently in the first two episodes of Battle 360.

== Awards ==

Distinguished Flying Cross (Posthumous)		Purple Heart (Posthumous)
Navy Presidential Unit Citation (Posthumous)	Prisoner of War Medal (Posthumous)	American Defense Service Medal (Posthumous)
American Campaign Medal (Posthumous)	Asiatic–Pacific Campaign Medal with two bronze campaign stars (Posthumous)	World War II Victory Medal (Posthumous)
