= Midway (2019 film) =

2019 war film by Roland Emmerich

- Theatrical release poster
- Directed by: Roland Emmerich
- Written by: Wes Tooke
- Produced by: Roland Emmerich; Harald Kloser
- Starring: Ed Skrein; Patrick Wilson; Luke Evans; Aaron Eckhart; Nick Jonas; Etsushi Toyokawa; Tadanobu Asano; Luke Kleintank; Jun Kunimura; Darren Criss; Keean Johnson; Mandy Moore; Dennis Quaid; Woody Harrelson
- Cinematography: Robby Baumgartner
- Edited by: Adam Wolfe
- Music by: Thomas Wander; Harald Kloser
- Production companies: Centropolis Entertainment; AGC Studios; Ruyi Films; Starlight Culture Entertainment; Street Entertainment; Entertainment One; The Mark Gordon Company; Bona Film Group
- Distributed by: Lionsgate (United States; under Summit Entertainment); Elevation Pictures (Canada); Huaxia Film Distribution (China)
- Release date: November 8, 2019
- Running time: 138 minutes
- Countries: United States; Canada; China
- Languages: English; Japanese
- Budget: $100 million
- Box office: $127.4 million

Midway is a 2019 war film directed by Roland Emmerich, produced with Harald Kloser, and written by Wes Tooke. It is a remake of the 1976 American film of the same title, Midway. The film covers the first six months in the Pacific Theater of World War II, from the Attack on Pearl Harbor to the titular Battle of Midway. The film stars Ed Skrein, Patrick Wilson, Luke Evans, Aaron Eckhart, Nick Jonas, Mandy Moore, Dennis Quaid, Tadanobu Asano, Darren Criss, and Woody Harrelson.

The film was a passion project of Emmerich's, and he had trouble getting financial support for the film before finally raising sufficient funds and officially announcing the project in 2017. Much of the cast joined in 2018, and filming began in Hawaii. Some filming also took place in Montreal. With a production budget of $100 million, it is to date one of the most expensive independent films of all time.

Midway was theatrically released by Lionsgate and Summit Entertainment in the United States on November 8, 2019 and received mixed reviews from critics, who praised the visuals but criticized the screenplay. The film was a box-office bomb, grossing $127.4 million worldwide against the $100 million budget.

== Plot ==
In December 1937, Lieutenant Commander Edwin T. Layton, an American naval attaché in Japan, is warned by Admiral Isoroku Yamamoto that US threats to their supply of oil would force Japan to wage war. The threats are realized on December 7, 1941 when the Japanese launch a surprise attack on Pearl Harbor, forcing the US to enter World War II. Admiral Yamamoto and Rear Admiral Tamon Yamaguchi propose an audacious follow-up plan to invade Midway Island but the Japanese Army overrules them. In February, naval aviator Lieutenant Richard "Dick" Best participates in raids launched from the carrier USS Enterprise against the Marshall Islands. In April, after Lieutenant-Colonel Jimmy Doolittle's raid on Tokyo, Yamamoto, Yamaguchi, and Vice Admiral Chuichi Nagumo are permitted to carry out their plan to attack Midway.

Following the Battle of the Coral Sea, Layton, Joseph Rochefort, and his cryptography team intercept Japanese messages about an operation against an objective identified only as "AF". Planners in Washington surmise AF is in the South Pacific but the newly appointed commander-in-chief of the U.S. Pacific Fleet, Admiral Chester W. Nimitz, remains skeptical. Layton, believing AF to be Midway, instructs the US base there to transmit an unencrypted message about a water shortage. Rochefort's men intercept a Japanese message about water shortages on "AF," confirming it to mean Midway. Nimitz orders the aircraft carriers USS Hornet and Enterprise recalled from the Coral Sea and demands the damaged USS Yorktown be repaired in 72 hours to deploy to Midway. Vice Admiral William Halsey Jr. is placed on sick leave due to a severe case of shingles, replaced by Rear Admiral Raymond A. Spruance.

On June 4, the Japanese launch an air raid on Midway. Initial attempts by US land-based aircraft to retaliate against the Japanese aircraft carriers fail, as does a submarine attack by USS Nautilus which is chased off by the Japanese destroyer Arashi. American torpedo planes planes attack the Japanese fleet without sinking any ships, but the Japanese are disrupted from launching their own strike on the American carriers. American dive bombers are unable to find the fleet until the Arashi is spotted by Wade McClusky rushing back to the fleet. They find the Japanese Combat Air Patrol at low level due to the previous attacks, allowing them to attack the Japanese aircraft carriers practically unopposed. The Kaga, Sōryū and Akagi are reduced to burning wrecks. The sole remaining Japanese carrier, Hiryu, launches a strike that succeeds in crippling Yorktown but Enterprise and Hornet successfully cripple the Hiryu in response. Admiral Yamaguchi chooses to go down with his command along with the carrier's captain, Tomeo Kaku, as Hiryu is scuttled.

At Pearl Harbor, Rochefort intercepts Yamamoto's order to withdraw and passes it to Layton, who informs Nimitz. Best is discharged from the Navy for lung problems incurred due to the use of faulty breathing apparatus during the battle and returns home to his wife and daughter.

== Cast ==
=== Allies ===
Actor	Role	Job
Ed Skrein	Lieutenant Dick Best	Commander, Bombing Squadron 6, USS Enterprise
Patrick Wilson	Lieutenant Commander Edwin Layton	Intelligence officer, US Pacific Fleet
Luke Evans	Lieutenant Commander Wade McClusky	Air group commander, USS Enterprise
Aaron Eckhart	Lieutenant Colonel Jimmy Doolittle	USAAF flight commander, embarked on USS Hornet
Nick Jonas	Aviation Machinist's Mate Bruno Gaido	Aviation crew, USS Enterprise
Luke Kleintank	Lieutenant Clarence E. Dickinson	Pilot, Scouting Squadron 6, USS Enterprise
Darren Criss	Lieutenant Commander Eugene Lindsey	Commander, Torpedo Squadron 6, USS Enterprise
Keean Johnson	Chief Aviation Radioman James Murray	Radio operator, Bombing Squadron 6, USS Enterprise
Alexander Ludwig	Lieutenant Roy Pearce	Watch officer, USS Arizona
Brennan Brown	Commander Joseph Rochefort	Chief Cryptanalyst, Fleet Radio Unit Pacific
Geoffrey Blake	Commander John Ford	Film director stationed at Midway Island on Special Duty
Russell Dennis Lewis	Ensign Frank O'Flaherty	Pilot, Scouting Squadron 6, USS Enterprise
Mark Rolston	Admiral Ernest J. King	Chief of Naval Operations
Jake Weber	Rear Admiral Raymond Spruance	Commander, Task Force 16
Eric Davis	Captain Miles Browning	Halsey's chief of staff, USS Enterprise
David Hewlett	Admiral Husband Kimmel	Commander-in-chief, US Pacific Fleet
Dennis Quaid	Vice Admiral William "Bull" Halsey	Commander, Carrier Division Two
Woody Harrelson	Admiral Chester W. Nimitz	Commander-in-chief, US Pacific Fleet
Brandon Sklenar	Ensign George "Tex" Gay	Pilot, Torpedo Squadron 8, USS Hornet
James Carpinello	Lieutenant Commander William Brockman	Captain, USS Nautilus

=== Japanese ===
Actor	Role	Job
Etsushi Toyokawa	Admiral Isoroku Yamamoto	Commander-in-chief, Combined Fleet
Tadanobu Asano	Rear Admiral Tamon Yamaguchi	Commander, 2nd Carrier Division
Jun Kunimura	Vice Admiral Chūichi Nagumo	Commander, 1st Air Fleet (Kidō Butai) and 1st Carrier Division
Peter Shinkoda	Commander Minoru Genda	Air Operations Officer, 1st Air Fleet
Hiro Kanagawa	Commander Isamu Fujita	Captain, Makigumo
Hiromoto Ida	General Hideki Tojo	Prime Minister
Hiroaki Shintani	Emperor Hirohito	
Nobuya Shimamoto	Captain Tomeo Kaku	Captain, Hiryū

=== Civilians ===
Actor	Role	Notes
Rachael Perrell Fosket	Dagne Layton	Edwin Layton's wife
Kenny Leu	Zhu Xuesan	Chinese school teacher, who visited the US in 1932
Mandy Moore	Anne Best	Dick Best's wife
Dean Schaller	Jack MacKenzie Jr.	Ford's cameraman

== Production ==
=== Development ===
On May 23, 2017, it was reported that Roland Emmerich would be directing the World War II film Midway. Due to its potential lofty budget (with estimates putting its needed cost at $125 million), Emmerich had trouble getting the film greenlit. When no major studio would bankroll the project, he cut down on potential battle sequences and turned to individuals for the funds, resulting in $76 million; he then got an additional $24 million in equity, mostly from Chinese investors, resulting in the film's $100 million budget. It is one of the most costly independent films ever made. Emmerich had previously attempted to mount the film at Sony Pictures in the 1990s, with William Goldman becoming interested in the project. However, as with the final rendition, executives balked at the proposed $100 million budget ($152 million by 2019 inflation), and Emmerich moved on to direct The Patriot.

Harald Kloser also produced the film. The Naval History and Heritage Command of the US Navy were involved in both the writing and production of the film.

=== Casting ===
In April 2018, Woody Harrelson and Mandy Moore joined the ensemble cast for the film. In July 2018, Luke Evans was cast in the film to play Lieutenant Commander Wade McClusky, who was awarded the Navy Cross for his role in the Battle of Midway. Robby Baumgartner was hired as cinematographer. August saw the additions of Patrick Wilson, Ed Skrein, Aaron Eckhart, Nick Jonas, Tadanobu Asano, Dennis Quaid, and others to the cast. Darren Criss, Alexander Ludwig, and Brandon Sklenar were cast in September.

=== Filming ===
Filming began on September 5, 2018, in Honolulu, Hawaii. It was also shot in Montreal, Quebec.

In November 2018, it was announced that VFX company Scanline VFX will be the main VFX vendor, and that Pixomondo had signed on to provide additional visual effects.

== Release ==
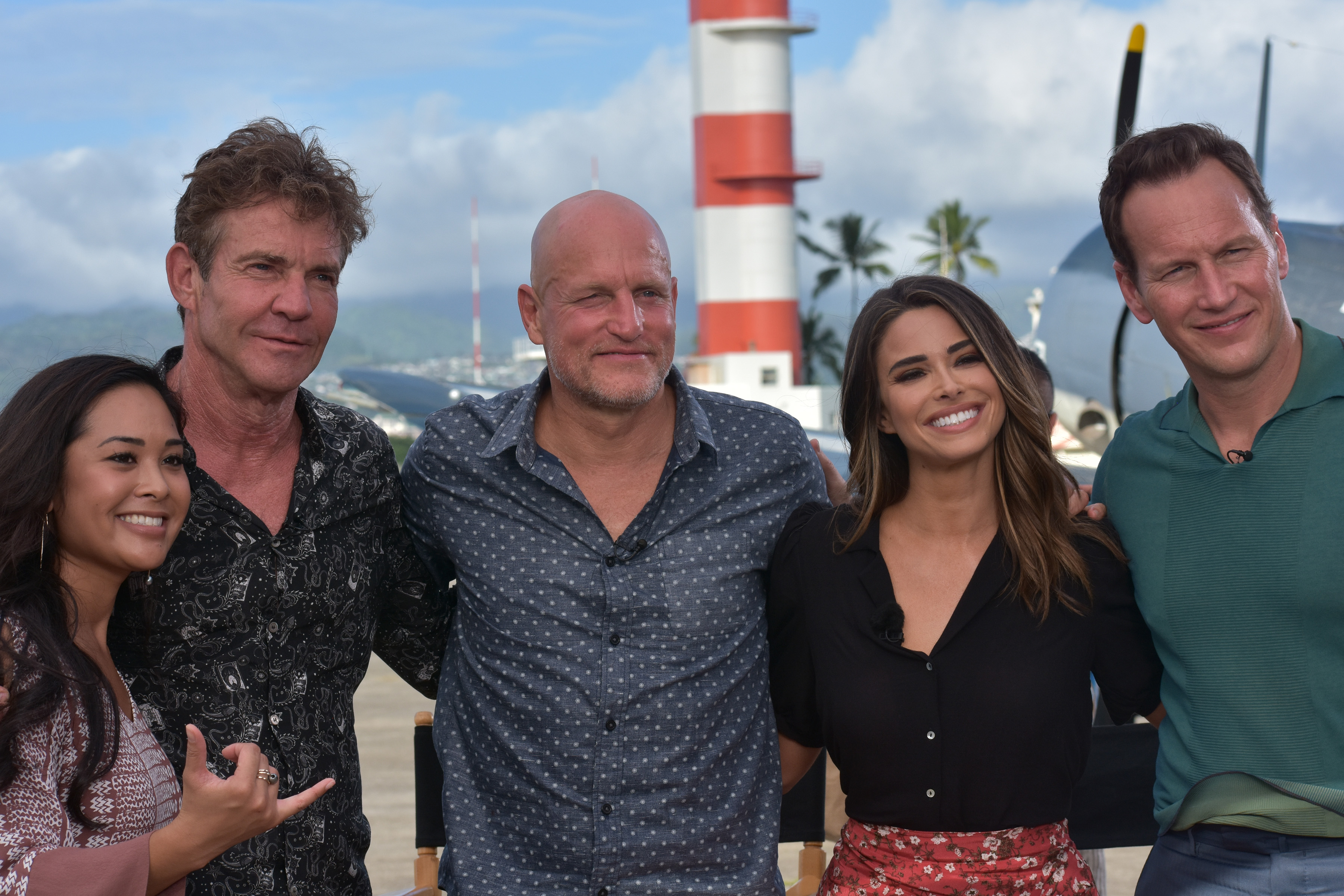
A photo from a press junket for the film

The film was released on November 8, 2019, Veterans Day weekend.

=== Marketing ===
A teaser poster for the film was released on June 4, 2019, which was also the 77th anniversary of the Battle of Midway. A set of 13 still photographs depicting scenes from the film was released on June 26, 2019, and the first trailer for the film was released the following day (June 27). The second and final trailer of the film was released on September 12, 2019, with the film's theatrical poster on September 25. All-in-all, Lionsgate spent around $40 million promoting the film.

=== Home media ===
Midway was released on Digital HD on February 4, 2020, and on DVD, Blu-ray and 4K Ultra HD, UHD-BD on February 18, 2020 by Lionsgate Films.

== Reception ==
=== Box office ===
Midway grossed $56.8 million in the United States and Canada, and $70.6 million in other countries, for a worldwide total of $127.4 million, against a production budget of $100 million.

In the United States and Canada, Midway was released alongside Doctor Sleep, Playing with Fire, and Last Christmas, and was projected to gross around $15 million from 3,242 theaters in its opening weekend. The film made $6.3 million on its first day (including $925,000 from Thursday night previews). It went on to debut to $17.9 million, beating box office expectations and upsetting projected winner Doctor Sleep by finishing first at the box office. In its second weekend the film made $8.5 million, finishing second behind newcomer Ford v Ferrari, before making $4.7 million and finishing in fifth in its third weekend.

=== Critical response ===
On review aggregator website Rotten Tomatoes, the film holds an approval rating of 42% based on 175 reviews and an average rating of 5.2/10. The site's critics consensus reads: "Midway revisits a well-known story with modern special effects and a more balanced point of view, but its screenplay isn't quite ready for battle." On Metacritic, the film has a weighted average score of 47 out of 100 based on 28 critics, indicating "mixed or average reviews". Audiences polled by CinemaScore gave the film an average grade of "A" on an A+ to F scale, while those at PostTrak gave it an average 4 out of 5 stars, with 58% saying they would definitely recommend it.

Barry Hertz of The Globe and Mail gave the film a score of 2 out of 4 stars, describing it as "a Second World War epic that runs a comparatively paltry 138 minutes yet feels about five times as long", concluding that the film was "a choppy bore, its main source of intrigue centred around whatever New Jersey-ese accent British actor Ed Skrein is attempting as dive bomber Richard Best." Michael O'Sullivan of The Washington Post gave the film a score of 2.5 out of 4 stars, saying that it "tells a story that's vividly and viscerally rendered, with all the entertainment value of a big, old-fashioned war movie", but added: "the kiss-kiss never really registers with quite the same impact as the bang-bang." Wendy Ide of The Observer gave the film a score of 2 out of 5 stars, writing: "Every tired war movie cliche is unearthed in a film that brings nothing new but will no doubt please fans of men in uniform yelling at explosions."

Paul Byrnes of The Sydney Morning Herald gave the film a score of 3 out of 5 stars, describing it as "one of [Roland Emmerich's] better films", but added: "There are a number of earlier versions to pick from, including John Ford's original 18-minute Oscar-winning documentary. We didn't need a new one, unless he had something new to say or a new way to say it. To both questions, the answer is no." Owen Gleiberman of Variety wrote: "The film's drama is B-movie basic. But the destructive colliding metal-on-metal inferno of what war is what makes Midway a picture worth seeing." Kenneth Turan of the Los Angeles Times described the film as being "so square, so old-school and old-fashioned, it almost feels avant-garde", adding: "It aims to celebrate heroism, sacrifice, determination and grit, and if you don't like that it really does not care."

== Historical accuracy ==
While the film takes some artistic license, Emmerich and Tooke were both adamant about being historically accurate, and Midway received praise from some combat veterans and historians for being a more accurate portrayal of events than Midway (1976) and Pearl Harbor (2001). Naval History and Heritage Command director and retired Navy Rear Admiral Sam Cox said: "Despite some of the 'Hollywood' aspects, this is still the most realistic movie about naval combat ever made."

Several seemingly "Hollywood-ized" events depicted in the film, such as Bruno Gaido sprinting into a parked plane to shoot down a crippled plane attempting to crash into the Enterprise, then getting promoted on the spot, occurred as shown, though according to USA Today, "Gaido hid after shooting the plane down, afraid he was going to get in trouble for leaving his battle station. "They had to hunt him down and bring him to Halsey", said retired U.S. Navy Rear Admiral Samuel J. Cox, director of the Naval History and Heritage Command.

== See also ==
- Midway (1976 film)
- Pearl Harbor (film)
- Tora! Tora! Tora! (1970 film)
- The Battle of Midway (1942 documentary short)
