= List of battles of the Imperial Japanese Navy =

The following are some of the battles of the Imperial Japanese Navy (IJN):

== By war ==
=== Boshin War (1868–1869) ===
- Naval Battle of Awa, 28 January 1868.
- Naval Battle of Miyako, March 1869.
- Naval Battle of Hakodate, May 1869 (Imperial Navy victory over the remnants of the shōgun's Navy of the Republic of Ezo.)

=== First Sino-Japanese War (1894–1895) ===
- Battle of Pungdo (First naval battle of the war)
- Battle of Yalu River (1894) (Major naval victory over China)
- Battle of Weihaiwei (Decisive Japanese victory in Land/Naval battle)

=== Russo-Japanese War (1904–1905) ===
- Battle of Port Arthur (February 1904, tactically inconclusive)
- Battle of Chemulpo Bay (February 1904, Japanese victory over small Russian squadron off present day Inchon)
- Battle of the Yellow Sea (August 1904, tactically inconclusive, Japanese strategic victory)
- Battle off Ulsan (August 1904, minor Japanese victory)
- Battle of Korsakov (August 1904, minor Japanese victory)
- Battle of Tsushima (May 1905, major Japanese naval victory over Russia)

=== World War I (1914–1918) ===
- Battle of Tsingtao. Naval actions against German interests in the Far-East, in particular the capture of the Tsingtao peninsula.
- Few ships diverted to Atlantic Ocean and Mediterranean Sea for escort duties cooperating with the British Royal Navy. In the Mediterranean, a fleet consisting of one armoured cruiser, Nisshin, and eight of the Navy's newest destroyers under Admiral Satō Kōzō, was based in Malta and efficiently protected allied shipping between Marseille, Taranto and ports in Egypt until the end of the War.
- Seizure of the former possessions of Germany in Micronesia (the Mariana Islands (excluding Guam), Caroline Islands and Marshall Islands).

== Interwar (1918–1941) ==
=== Second Sino-Japanese War (1937–1945) ===
Besides support for Imperial Japanese Army operations, the Navy operations involved many landing operations by the Special Naval Landing Forces along the coasts and rivers of the Republic of China, French Indochina and along the Yangtze River and its tributaries. The Navy provided much of the air support for operations in the first few years of the war in central and southern China.

- Battle of Shanghai
- Battle of Beiping-Tianjin
- Battle of Nanking
- Amoy Operation
- Battle of Wuhan
- Canton Operation
- Hainan Island Operation
- Battle of Nanchang
- Swatow Operation
- 1st Battle of Changsha
- Battle of South Guangxi
- 1939-40 Winter Offensive
- Indochina Expedition
- 2nd Battle of Changsha
- 3rd Battle of Changsha

== World War II (1941–1945) ==
- Attack on Pearl Harbor (7 December 1941, major Japanese tactical victory; destruction of much of the United States Navy (USN) battleship fleet, strategically inconclusive)
- Battle of Wake Island (8–23 December 1941, Japanese victory against US)
- Battle off Malaya (10 December 1941, decisive Japanese victory; destruction of the British Royal Navy (RN) in Malaya)
- Battle of Balikpapan (23–24 January 1942, Allied tactical victory, Japanese strategic victory)
- Operation R (23 January–9 February 1942, Japanese victory)
- Battle off Endau (26–27 January 1942, Japanese victory against Allies)
- Battle off the Marshall and Gilbert Islands (1 February 1942, Allied tactical victory, strategically inconclusive)
- Battle of Makassar Strait (4 February, 1942, Japanese victory against Allies)
- Attack on Darwin (19 February 1942, Japanese victory against Allies)
- Battle of Badung Strait (18–19 February 1942, Japanese victory against Allies)
- Battle off Bougainville (20 February 1942, US tactical victory, Japanese strategic victory)
- First Battle of the Java Sea (27 February 1942, major Japanese victory against Allies; IJN sinks five warships without loss)
- Battle of Sunda Strait (28 February–1 March 1942, major Japanese victory against Allies; IJN destroys Allied fleet)
- Second Battle of the Java Sea (1 March 1942, decisive Japanese victory; destruction of the Allied naval force in Indonesia)
- Battle of Salamaua-Lae (8-13 March 1942, Allied tactical victory, Japanese strategic victory)
- Operation C (31 March 1942, Japanese victory against Allies)
- Battle of the Coral Sea (4-8 May 1942, Japanese tactical victory, Allied strategic victory)
- Attack on Sydney Harbour (31 May–8 June 1942, Japanese tactical victory, strategically inconclusive)
- Battle of Midway (5 June 1942, major US victory; IJN loses four carriers, while USN loses one carrier)
- Battle of Savo Island (9 August 1942, major Japanese tactical victory against Allies; IJN sinks four heavy cruisers without loss, strategically inconclusive)
- Battle of the Eastern Solomons (24 August 1942, US victory)
- Battle of Cape Esperance (11-12 October 1942, US tactical victory, strategically inconclusive)
- Battle of the Santa Cruz Islands (26 October 1942, Japanese tactical victory, US strategic victory)
- Battle of Guadalcanal (12–15 November 1942, major US victory; USN repulses major IJN troop convoy)
- Battle of Tassafaronga (30 November 1942, Japanese tactical victory against US, strategically inconclusive)
- Battle of Rennell Island (29-30 January 1943, Japanese defensive victory against US)
- Battle of the Bismarck Sea (2-4 March 1943, major Allied victory; Allied aircraft destroy major IJN troop convoy)
- Battle of Blackett Strait (6 March 1943, US victory)
- Battle of the Komandorski Islands (26 March 1943, tactically inconclusive, US strategic victory)
- Operation I-Go (1-16 April 1943, Japanese tactical victory against Allies, strategically inconclusive)
- Battle of Kula Gulf (6 July 1943, US tactical victory, strategically inconclusive)
- Battle of Kolombangara (12–13 July 1943, Japanese tactical victory against Allies, strategically inconclusive)
- Battle of Vella Gulf (6-7 August 1943, major US victory; USN sinks three destroyers without loss)
- Battle off Horaniu (17-18 August 1943, Japanese defensive victory against US)
- Battle of Vella Lavella (6 October 1943, Japanese defensive victory against US)
- Battle of Empress Augusta Bay (1 November 1943, US victory)
- Battle off Rabaul (2-11 November 1943, Allied victory)
- Battle of Cape St. George (25 November 1943, major US victory; USN sinks three destroyers without loss)
- Battle of Truk (17-18 February 1944, major US victory; IJN loses 15 warships and 32 merchant ships)
- Battle of the Philippine Sea (19 June 1944, decisive US victory; IJN loses three carriers and hundreds of aircraft)
- Battle of Formosa (12-16 October 1944, major US victory; IJN loses hundreds of aircraft)
- Battle of Leyte Gulf (23-26 October 1944, decisive Allied victory; IJN loses 28 warships, including four carriers and three battleships)
- Battle off Samar (25 October 1944, Japanese tactical victory, US strategic victory)
- Battle of Ormoc Bay (11 November-21 December 1944, US victory)
- First Battle of Kure (19 March 1945, Japanese defensive victory against US)
- Battle of the Malacca Strait (15-16 May 1945, RN victory)
- Operation Kikusui (6 April–22 June 1945, Allied defensive victory)
- Operation Ten-Go (7 April 1945, major US victory; destruction of the last IJN battle fleet)
- Battle of Yokosuka (18 July 1945, Allied victory)
- Battle of Tokyo Bay (22–23 July 1945, US victory)
- Second Battle of Kure (24-28 July 1945, major Allied victory; most of the remaining IJN warships are sunk)

== See also ==
- List of Japanese battles
