= Eiji Gotō =

Imperial Japanese Navy vice admiral (1887-1967)

- 後藤 英次
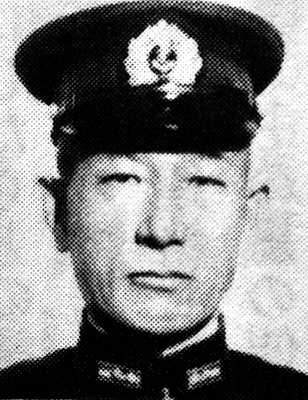
- Born: November 5, 1887; Daisen, Akita, Japan
- Died: November 24, 1967 (aged 80)
- Education: Imperial Japanese Naval Academy; Naval Artillery School; Torpedo Warfare School
- Military career
- Allegiance: Empire of Japan
- Branch: Imperial Japanese Navy
- Service years: 1909–1945
- Rank: Vice Admiral
- Units: Soya, Izumo, Tsugaru, Iwate, Chiyoda, Aki, Tokiwa, Asama
- Commands: Yayoi, Fubuki, Momi, Sumida, Toba, Katata, Hishi, DD-5, DD-41, Usugumo, Naka, Takao, Mutsu, 5th Torpedo Squadron, 2nd Torpedo Squadron, 24th Air Flotilla, Chinkai Guard District, Northeast Area Fleet, 12th Air Fleet, Ōminato Guard District
- Conflicts: World War I; Second Sino-Japanese War; World War II; Battle of Wake Island; Marshalls–Gilberts raids; Action off Bougainville

Eiji Gotō (後藤 英次, Gotō Eiji; November 5, 1887 – November 24, 1967) was a vice admiral in the Imperial Japanese Navy during World War II.

== Biography ==
Gotō was a native of Takanashi Village in Senboku District, Akita (what is now the city of Daisen, Akita), and a graduate of the 37th class of the Imperial Japanese Naval Academy in 1909. After serving as a midshipman on the cruisers Soya and Izumo he graduated from Naval Artillery School and Torpedo Warfare School in 1911, and served as a crewman on the cruisers Tsugaru, Iwate and Chiyoda from 1912-1914. As a lieutenant during World War I, he served on the battleship Aki and cruiser Tokiwa, before receiving his first command, the destroyer Yayoi on 26 April 1919. He subsequently commanded the destroyers Fubuki and (as lieutenant commander) Momi.

In January 1923, Gotō was reassigned to river gunboats, as captain of the Sumida, Toba and Katata, returning in December 1924 as captain of the destroyer Hishi, followed by the DD-5 in 1925. He was promoted to commander on 1 December 1926.

After a brief period of shore duty, Gotō was given command of the destroyer DD-41 in 1928, followed by the Usugumo; in December 1928 he was assigned as executive officer to the cruiser Asama.

From December 1929, Gotō was assigned to command minesweeper flotillas and destroyer squadrons and was promoted to captain in December 1931. He was given command of the cruiser Naka in November 1933, followed by the Takao in November 1934, and the battleship Mutsu in December 1936. Gotō was promoted to rear admiral on 1 December 1937. During the Second Sino-Japanese War he commanded the 5th Torpedo Squadron, followed by the 2nd Torpedo Squadron. He was promoted to vice admiral on 15 October 1941.

== World War II ==
By the outset of the war, Gotō commanded the 24th Air Flotilla. He took part in the battle for Wake Island, his bombers destroying several American aircraft on the ground on the first day of combat. But soon, his planes began to encounter fierce resistance and were only relieved by the arrival of Rear-Admiral Tamon Yamaguchi's relief force.

On February 1, 1942, while Gotō was in command of aircraft bases in the Marshall Islands and Gilbert Islands, the Allies launched the Marshalls–Gilberts raids in which Japanese positions in Micronesia were attacked by United States Navy aircraft primarily in an effort to boost American public morale. Although fewer than 18 Japanese aircraft were shot down or destroyed by bombs, Gotō came under criticism for his failure to shoot down the bombers. He was also the primary Japanese commander during the action off Bougainville on 20 February 1942 which resulted in the loss of 23 Japanese aircraft against only 2 Americans. Gotō was relieved of his combat command, and reassigned as commander of the Chinkai Guard District on 15 September 1942.

On 15 September 1944, Gotō was in command of the 12th Air Fleet, and concurrently was placed in command of the Ōminato Guard District from 15 February 1945; however, from 15 March, he was placed on the inactive list awaiting reassignment and resigned from active service on 21 May 1945.

Gotō died in November 24, 1967.

== Notes ==
Military offices
Preceded by Tozuka Michitarō	Commander-in-chief of the Northeast Area Fleet; 15 September 1944 - 5 December 1944	Succeeded by None; Fleet Dissolved
