= Bellante =

Bellante may refer to:

- Bellante, Abruzzo, Italy, a town
  - Bellante Stazione, a frazione
- Joseph F. Bellante Jr. (1932–2011), American educator and politician
- Princess Bellante, a character in George Frideric Handel's first opera Almira
