= American carrier raids of 1942 =

US air-naval offensives in the Pacific

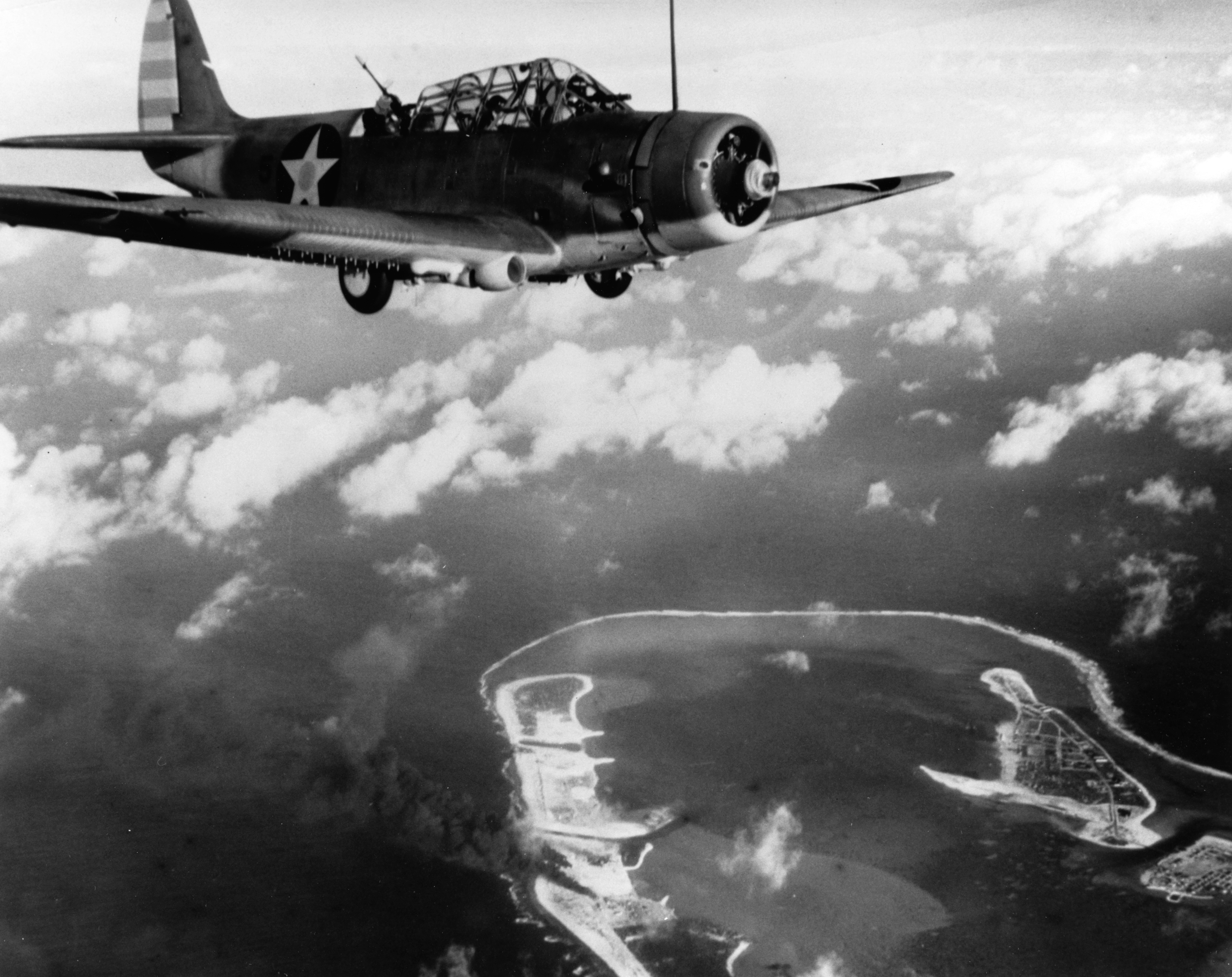
Douglas TBD Devastator of VT-6 from the carrier USS Enterprise over Wake Island

A series of operations by American aircraft carriers was undertaken in the first half of 1942 in response to the Japanese attack on Pearl Harbor. Six American air-naval operations conducted from January to the end of April 1942 were aimed at harassing Japan during the height of the Japanese offensive in Southeast Asia, improving the morale of the American forces, which had deteriorated after the attack on Pearl Harbor, and also showing Japan that despite all the defeats of the Allies during this time, the United States Navy could carry out effective strikes. The last of these raids directly accelerated the Japanese attack on Midway, which had strategic consequences for the Pacific War.

== Background ==
On December 7, 1941, the Japanese 1st Air Fleet made a surprise attack on Pearl Harbor, which resulted in the sinking or damaging of 18 US Navy ships. Contrary to Admiral Yamamoto's expectations, despite the American fleet's morale being shaken, the Japanese attack mobilized the American public. However, after the loss or damage of five battleships at Pearl Harbor and the need to maintain large forces in the Atlantic to fight the Kriegsmarine, the only real strength of the US Navy in the Pacific (apart from submarines) remained three aircraft carriers of the Lexington and Yorktown classes. Although the Pacific Fleet was strengthened by the transfer of the USS Yorktown to the Pacific, the torpedoed USS Saratoga was put out of service for half a year in January. By the time USS Hornet arrived in the Pacific in March 1942, the Pacific Fleet had only three carriers compared to ten carriers of various sizes in the Combined Fleet. So, not having the forces necessary to oppose the Japanese fleet directly, Admirals King and Nimitz—who took over from the dismissed commander of the Pacific Fleet Kimmel on December 31, 1941—developed a plan for quick single-carrier strikes against Japanese outposts. The purpose of these raids was not to inflict heavy losses on Japan but, in accordance with the "Germany First" doctrine developed during the Arcadia Conference between Roosevelt and Churchill, to strike back and to harass Japanese forces.

== Raids ==
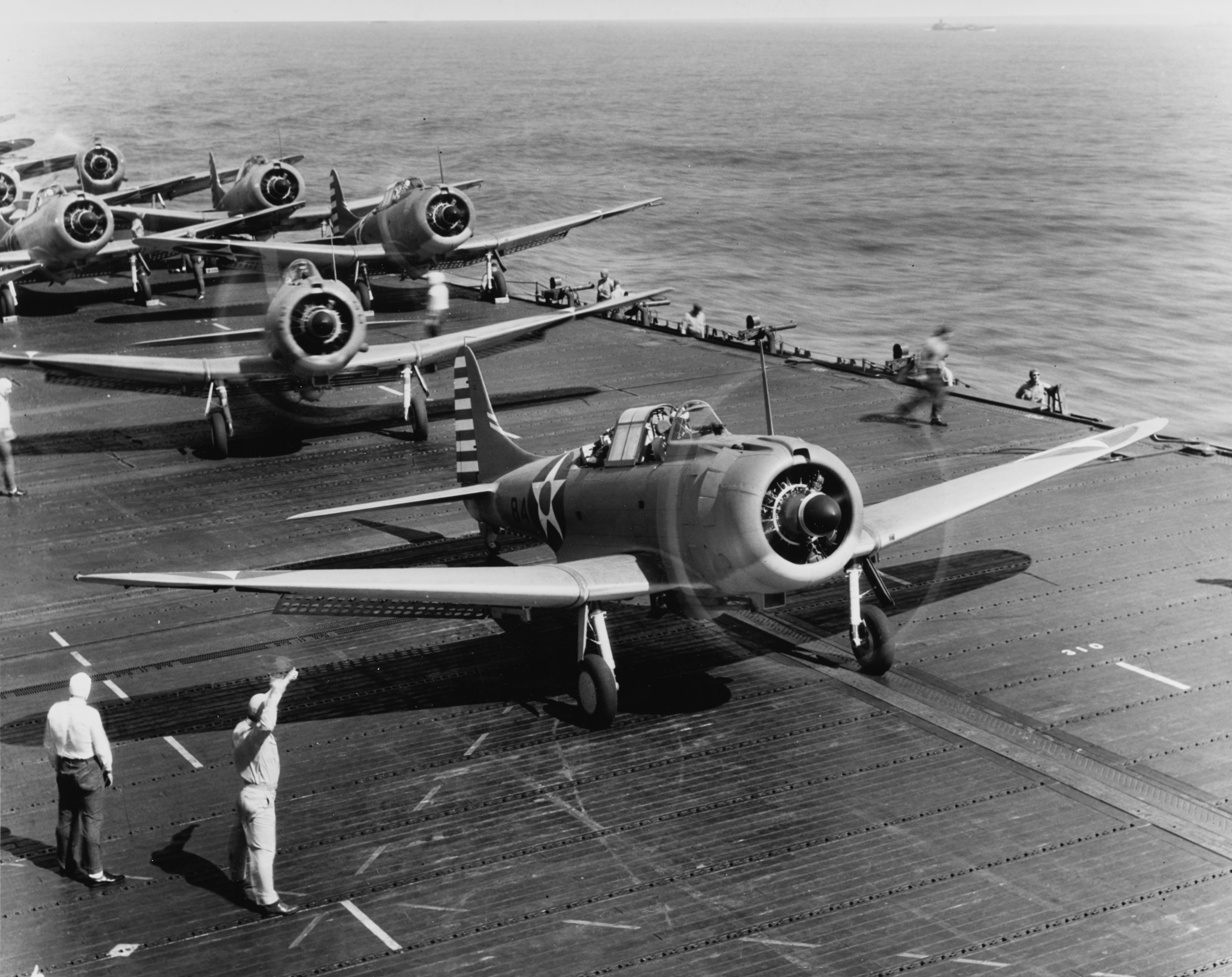
Douglas SBD Dauntless from VB-6 taking-off from the deck of USS Enterprise to strike Wake on February 24, 1942

Admiral Nimitz ordered a series of raids on Wake Island, which was just recently captured by Japanese forces. In January 1942 the carrier USS Lexington led a raiding force. But after a Japanese submarine 'jumped' the task force and sank an accompanying oiler, this first raid was aborted.

The next targets were selected in the Marshall and Gilbert islands. This sprawling mission was jointly assigned to Task Force 8, which was centered around the USS Enterprise and commanded by Admiral William Halsey; and Task Force 17, centered on USS Yorktown, under command of Admiral Frank Fletcher. Together the two battle groups sneaked out of Hawaii to the west, crossed the central Pacific, then split toward their separate targets: Enterprise attacked Kwajalein, Maloelap, and Wotje atolls, and Yorktown raided Mili and Jaluit atolls, all in the Marshalls; and Yorktown raided Makin Atoll (Butaritari) in the Gilberts.

These raids on February 1, 1942 did not cause severe damage to Japanese forces, but they gained valuable combat experience for US Navy aviators and for the carrier flight-deck crews, who responded well to intensive combat deck operations, and for US Marine aviators providing anti-aircraft defense of both carriers.

Target	Date	Carrier	Task Force	Commanding officer
Marshall Islands	February 1, 1942	Enterprise	Task Force 8	William Halsey
Gilbert Islands	February 1, 1942	Yorktown	Task Force 17	Frank Fletcher
Rabaul	February 20, 1942	Lexington	Task Force 11	Wilson Brown
Wake	February 24, 1942	Enterprise	Task Force 16	William Halsey
Marcus	March 4, 1942	Enterprise	Task Force 16	William Halsey
Salamaua and Lae	March 10, 1942	Yorktown and Lexington	Task Force 17	Frank Fletcher
Japanese archipelago	April 18, 1942	Enterprise and Hornet	Task Force 16	William Halsey

The next American carrier raid was targeted at the Japanese base at the newly-captured city, Rabaul, but Admiral Wilson Brown aborted the operation on February 20 after he learned that his USS Lexington task force (TF 11), running off Bougainville Island, was spotted by a Japanese patrol plane—and that the vital element of surprise was lost. TF 11 immediately turned and began withdrawing, but was soon targeted by a squadron of 17 Mitsubishi G4M "Betty" land-based medium bombers. Therein ensued a daylong series of maneuvers and aerial attacks and battles between the two forces: Japanese fighter-planes and bombers attacked TF 11 while US Navy air squadrons defended. On both sides individual efforts of heroism were common. US Navy Lieutenant Edward O'Hare was credited with shooting down five enemy bombers and became the first US Navy aviator in World War II to receive the Medal of Honor—(later he was made namesake of O'Hare airfield in Chicago).

Some three weeks after the raid on Kwajalein, USS Enterprise and TF 16 (Admiral Halsey commanding) again raided Japanese bases across the north Pacific, striking Wake Island on February 24, 1942 and Marcus Island on March 4. The attack on Wake Island destroyed several aircraft and several hundred thousand liters of fuel, and knocked this base out of the war for several months. The Marcus Island raid shocked the Japanese military mindset—that island was only 1,000 air miles from Tokyo and some 600 miles from the Bonin Islands with its large military base, and all were situated in local, 'Japanese-controlled' waters. It was another warning to the Japanese command that the empire's capital city was within reach of the US carrier navy.

From early January 1942 Japanese air, ground, and naval forces intensified their southward offensive to expand the boundaries of the Empire in the south Pacific. After capturing Rabaul (February, 1942), on March 8 the Japanese attacked the north shore of New Guinea again, with landings at Salamaua and Lae. In response, on March 10, and from the south shore of New Guinea, Admiral Frank Fletcher launched air-carrier raids from TF 17 against those assets newly inserted at Salamaua and Lae. The surprise attacks sank an armed merchant cruiser, two transport ships, and a minesweeper and damaged several more shore craft and other assets; and it was the first American operation presenting a two-carrier (Yorktown and Lexington) task force—a prelude to future tactics.

The aircraft carriers Yorktown and Lexington, operating in the Southwest Pacific, could not take part in another sortie—the most audacious of all—Doolittle's Tokyo raid. On April 18, 1942, 16 North American B-25 Mitchell medium bombers taking off from the Hornet bombed the armament plants in the Japanese cities of Tokyo, Nagoya, and Kobe. With a small number of bombers used for this purpose, the industrial losses inflicted on Japan were insignificant. However, it did cause slight damage to the light aircraft carrier Ryūhō.

Meanwhile, on April 25, 1942, Hornet and the Enterprise escorting her on her way to Japan, safely returned to Pearl Harbor, ending the period of American raids before the great carrier battles of 1942. Due to this raid, however, both carriers could not participate in the first one, in the Coral Sea.

== The importance of raids ==
It remains an open question whether the American carrier raids in the first half of 1942 were worth the risk, given their negligible effect in terms of Japanese material losses. This is especially true of the Marshall Islands raid when Admiral Halsey's Task Force 8 was within range of three Japanese airfields for many hours. A series of American raids, however, gave ship crews and members of their air groups invaluable combat experience before the large air-sea battles awaiting them from mid-year—the battle of the Coral Sea, the battle of Midway, and two in the bloody campaign around Guadalcanal. These raids also showed the imperfections of the American ship air defense and the combat air patrol control system, which allowed for drawing conclusions and improving them.

However, the raid on the Japanese islands was of great importance. Not only for improving the morale of the American public in the face of the defeats of the Allies on all fronts of World War II in 1942, but also had great psychological significance for the Japanese society and the command of the Japanese armed forces, and consequently was of strategic importance for the entire war. It convinced the Japanese army, which had so far opposed Admiral Yamamoto's plans to attack Midway, that it was necessary to destroy the American aircraft carriers. Hence, the command of the imperial army agreed to assign its units for the Japanese Navy attack in the Central Pacific and the landing on Midway Atoll. As a result of the attack on the Japanese Islands, on April 20, the Japanese Army Command also agreed to delay the attack on New Caledonia, Samoa, and Fiji until the end of operations against American aircraft carriers in the Central Pacific.

== Bibliography ==
- Hone, Trent (2022). Mastering the Art of Command: Admiral Chester W. Nimitz and Victory in the Pacific. Annapolis: Naval Institute Press. ISBN 978-1682475959.
- Stafford, Edward P. (January 15, 2016). The Big E: The Story of the USS Enterprise, Illustrated Edition. Annapolis: Naval Institute Press. ISBN 978-1591148029.
- Stille, Mark (October 12, 2021). Pacific Carrier War: Carrier Combat from Pearl Harbor to Okinawa. Osprey. ISBN 978-1472826336.
- Toll, Ian W. (November 14, 2011). Pacific Crucible. Pacific War Trilogy. Vol. War at Sea in the Pacific, 1941–1942. New York City: Norton & Company. ISBN 978-0393068139.
- Zimm, Alan (2011). The Attack on Pearl Harbor: Strategy, Combat, Myths, Deceptions. Casemate Publishers. ISBN 9781612000107.
