= Northeast Area Fleet =

- Active: 5 August 1943 – 5 December 1944
- Country: (Empire of Japan)
- Branch: Imperial Japanese Navy
- Battle honours: Pacific Theatre of World War II

Commanders
- Notable commanders: Michitaro Tozuka

The Northeast Area Fleet (北東方面艦隊, Hokutō Hōmen Kantai) was a fleet of the Imperial Japanese Navy established during World War II.

== History ==
The Northeast Area Fleet was a short-lived operational headquarters of the Imperial Japanese Navy, established on August 5, 1943. As United States Navy forces had driven the Japanese out of the Aleutian Islands in late 1943 to early 1944, an organizational structure was required to coordinate Japan's northern defenses against the possibility that the United States would extend operations from the Aleutians into the Chishima Islands, Karafuto and to northern Japan itself. The new Northeast Area Fleet was a combined operational command containing surviving elements of the IJN 5th Fleet, IJN 12th Air Fleet and ground elements. As it became eventually evident that the United States had no intention of using the northern approaches to Japan as an invasion route, gradually most of its forces were reassigned to other theaters of the war. The Northeast Area Fleet itself was disbanded on December 5, 1944.

== Transition ==
Date	Higher unit	Lower units
5 August 1943 (original)	Combined Fleet	5th Fleet, 12th Air Fleet
1 April 1944	Combined Fleet	5th Fleet, 12th Air Fleet, 22nd Cruiser Division, Chishima Area Base Force
15 August 1944	Combined Fleet	5th Fleet, 12th Air Fleet, Chishima Area Base Force
5 December 1944	disbanded	

== Commanders of the IJN Northern Area Fleet ==
Commander in chief

	Rank	Name	Date	Additional post
1	Vice Admiral	Michitaro Tozuka	August 5, 1943 - September 15, 1944	Commander of the 12th Air Fleet
2	Vice Admiral	Eiji Goto	September 15, 1944 – December 5, 1944	Commander of the 12th Air Fleet

Chief of staff

	Rank	Name	Date	Additional post
1	Rear-Admiral	Yoshiyuki Ichimiya	August 5, 1942 – December 5, 1944	Chief of staff of the 12th Air Fleet
