= Siege of Gongenyama =

Siege of Gogenyama
- Part of the Sengoku period
Date	1510
Location	Gogen-yama Castle, Kanagawa Prefecture
Result	Uesugi victory

Belligerents
forces of Ueda Masamori	forces of Uesugi Tomoyoshi

Commanders and leaders
Ueda Masamori	Uesugi Tomoyoshi

The siege of Gongenyama (権現山の戦い) occurred in 1510 during the Sengoku period of Japan's history. The daimyō Uesugi Tomoyoshi (上杉朝良; died 1518) had a retainer Ueda Masamori (上田政盛) who rebelled against him and laid siege to his castle of Gongenyama. Masamori was defeated.
