= Battle of Samdunja =

1920 Korean rebel–Japanese army conflict

- Part of Korean Independence Movement
Date	June 4–6, 1920
Location	Samdunja, Jilin, Manchuria
Result	Korean victory

Belligerents
Empire of Japan: Nanyang Garrison; 19th Division; Kempeitai	Provisional Government of the Republic of Korea: Korean Northern Army Command

Commanders and leaders
Lt. Jiro Nihimi; Lt. Jiro Arayoshi	Park Seung-gil; Yi Heung-su; Hong Beom-do

Strength
One infantry company One military police company	30 fighters

Casualties and losses
One police officer wounded 60 soldiers killed.	2 fighters killed. 9 Korean civilians killed, and three wounded.

The Battle of Samdunja (Korean: 삼둔자 전투; Hanja: 三屯子戰鬪) was fought between June 4 and June 6, 1920 on the banks of the Wolshin River in Manchuria between the combined force of the Northern Korean Military Office and the Shinmindan against the Imperial Japanese Army.

One company of the Korean Independence Army joined forces and defeated one company of the Japanese Army's Nanyang Garrison (南陽守備隊) led by Lieutenant Jiro Nihimi at Samdunja on the banks of the Wolshin River in Hwaryong County, East Gando, Manchuria. The Korean Independence Army preemptively attacked the Japanese army with the aim of taking over the country. It led to the Battle of Bongo-dong and is broadly seen as a part of the Battle of Fengwudong.

After the battle, a unit of Japanese military police pursued the Korean force into Chinese territory on June 6. As they could not find the Korean force, the Japanese massacred civilians in retaliation. The Korean unit, which was hiding at Beomjinryeong Hill, ambushed the Japanese and then retreated.

The Battle of Samdunja in Wolshin River led to the Battle of Fengwudong on June 7, 1920. The Battle of Samdunja was a small-scale domestic incursion operation that the independence army had normally carried out until now. At the same time, it was the first time the Japanese army invaded mainland China.

== Overview ==
Launched on May 28, 1920, the combined independence army unit of the Korean Independence Army and Northern Korean Military Department attempted to invade Korea for the first time. On June 4, a platoon of the Korean Independence Army under the Korean New People's Army entered Gangyang-dong, Jongseong-gun, Hamgyeongbuk-do and patrolled the Japanese army's Jongseong. The platoon was attacked. That evening, the Japanese army dispatched a platoon of troops for the purpose of retaliation and crossed the Duman River to pursue the independence army. At Samdunja, the independence army of the Northern Korean Military Department defeated a company under the Namyang Garrison led by Jiro Arayoshi and a military police company.

== Preparing for a preemptive strike ==
In May 1920, independence army units active in Manchuria, including the independence army unit led by Hong Beom-do, the unit of the Military Affairs Command led by Choi Jin-dong, the Gando National Association unit led by An-mu, and the Shinmindan, gathered in Bongo-dong, Wangcheong - hyeon. In Bongo-dong, villages were located on the left and right valleys with the mountain in the middle, all of which were inhabited by Koreans. The combined forces of the independence army, with Hong Beom-do as commander-in-chief, camped on the ridge, dispatched a scouting party to the surrounding villages, and waited for the Japanese army to arrive. However, when the Japanese army did not appear easily, they planned and launched a preemptive attack.

At 5 a.m. on June 4, 1920, a 30-strong independence army small unit departing from Samdunja, Hwaryonghyeon, crossed the Duman River and defeated a Japanese platoon in Gangyang-dong, Jongseong-gun, Hamgyeong-do. The Japanese immediately sent Lieutenant Arayoshi Jiro (新美二郞), a former member of the 23rd Korean Military Academy, with a company from the Namyang Garrison and a company of military police to pursue them.

== Battle ==
=== Preemptive strike ===
On June 4, 1920, one platoon under the Korean Independence Army 's Hong Beom-do Unit and Choi Jin- dong Unit each departed from Samdunja, Hwaryong-hyeon, North Gando, crossed the Wolsingang River, passed through Gando, and crossed the Duman River and were stationed in Gangyang -dong, Jongseong -gun, Hamgyeongbuk-do. A platoon-sized Japanese military police border post was attacked and annihilated. At that time, the Japanese military obtained secret information about the independence army's operation to enter the country and was interested in the activities of the Korean independence army roaming around the border area of Manchuria and was seeking defense measures, which became the trigger for the battle. A small unit of the independence army, consisting of about 30 people, departed from Samdunja at dawn on June 4 of that year as part of the usual domestic invasion operation, crossed the Duman River, and advanced to Gangyang-dong (江陽洞), 5 ri (about 2 km (1.22 miles)) north of Jongseong-gun, from there to Fuku. After defeating the Japanese military police patrol platoon led by an officer named Fukue (福江), they returned across the Duman River at dusk and ended the operation. On the morning of June 4, when the Jongseong-gun military police patrol station was devastated, the Namyang Garrison recognized that it was the work of the independence army and immediately dispatched troops.

=== Ambushing the Nanyang Garrison ===
On the morning of June 4, as retaliation for the surprise attack, a company of the Namyang Garrison and military police company led by Army Lieutenant Jiro Nihimi and Lieutenant Arayoshi, crossed the Tuman River and attacked. The Japanese Army's Namyang Garrison (南陽守備隊), which received urgent information from the border post area that confirmed the surprise attack by the independence forces stationed at Samdunja.

When these troops reached Samdunja and could not find the independence army, they slaughtered some civilians. The independence army hid in the hilly area southwest of Samdunja. Choi Jin-dong (崔振東) of the North Korean Military Department lured the army into an ambush and destroyed the subordinate company of the Namyang Garrison. Arayoshi quickly fled with his remaining troops. With this, the battle ended in the early morning of June 6.

Accordingly, the Independence Army Combined Forces Command ambushed one platoon at the foot of Beomjinryeong, a hill in Bonghwa-ri, southwest of Samdunja, and stationed a small number of troops led by Platoon Commander Yi Hwa-il on the high ground to engage in a gunfight to lure the Japanese army out into the open. Upon learning of defeat in the battle, the Japanese Army's Namyang Garrison Headquarters and the Japanese Army's 19th Army Infantry Division dispatched troops around 6 a.m. on June 6, 1920. It was around 10 a.m. on June 6 when the Japanese pursued the Independence Army unit to the front of Beomjinryeong, where they were hiding.

Afterwards, at 10 a.m. on June 6, the Japanese army pursued the hidden independence army unit. By noon on June 6, the Independence Army fired simultaneously from a mountainous hill about 100 meters high, killing 60 soldiers from one company of the Japanese Army's Namyang Garrison. Two independence fighters were killed, and nine residents of a nearby village were killed by stray bullet fragments. The guidance operation of Platoon Commander Lee Hwa-il, who displayed outstanding skills in this battle, is highly regarded.

=== Retreat ===
The commander of the Japanese Army's 19th Infantry Division dispatched the Wolshin Pursuit Battalion, an infantry and machine gun battalion commanded by Major Jiro Yasukawa (安川二郞). Hong Beom-do and Choi Jin-dong, who learned of this fact within an hour or two through a letter sent by an Independence Army spy tied to a bird's leg, commanded the Independence Army to use the top hill as an operational advantage if they were to confront a superior enemy with an inferior force of less than one battalion. Deciding that it would be less disadvantageous to expand the view by climbing up the mountain, they retreated to the north and divided into groups, sending some to the top of the mountain and others to make a camp on the rear hill of Ansan Village, while setting up fences and scarecrows in the nearby area. were installed.

== Announcement by the Provisional Government and Japan’s announcement ==
Although the victory in the Battle of Samdunja had less significance, the Shanghai Provisional Government Military Affairs Department published a commentary on the Battle of Samdunja and left a report on the results. The Provisional Government's Military Affairs Department described the Battle of Samdunja as follows:

“At 5 a.m. on June 4, 1920, a platoon of our forces departed from Samdunja on the Wolsingang River in Hwaryong-hyeon and crossed to the upstream of Gangyang- dong, Jongseong-gun, about 5 ri north of Jongseong-gun, and met Gunjo Fukue (福江三太), the head of the Japanese enemy post in the area. They defeated about one platoon of enemy soldiers (military police) led by Gu, and as the weather was just about to set, they crossed the river and returned to guard against the enemy. While they were guarding against the enemy, Lieutenant Shinmi-gu, Infantry Lieutenant, commander of the Japanese Namyang Garrison, After investigating the report of Hwaryonghyeon's defeat, he immediately led one company of his subordinates and about 10 military police patrolmen, crossed the river with a revenge war strategy, and advanced toward the friendly forces. When the friendly forces' search troops discovered this and immediately alerted the main unit, the friendly commander Choi Jin-dong hid his subordinate's 1st platoon in the shadowy area southwest of Samdunja, sent out some soldiers, made a false attack, and then falsely retired, so the Japanese took chase action and took Eunbok. As soon as they arrived at the front line of our army's unit (at 10 p.m. on the 6th), the enemy's unit was destroyed by rapid fire, and the remaining soldiers retreated to the northern part of Samdunja, and the commander of the Japanese enemy's 39th division received urgent news of the defeat in the war and headed Yasukawa (安川).) Order to dispatch to the major.”

— Provisional Government Military Affairs Department

Meanwhile, the provisional government's report did not record the massacre of civilians. Meanwhile, the Japanese military records describe the progress of the Battle of Samdunja in which they suffered a crushing defeat and the facts of the massacre of civilians, but concealed the fact that they suffered a crushing defeat and the damage suffered in the battle with the Korean Independence Army. In addition, the Japanese report conceals most of the damage they suffered in various battles at the time.

== Aftermath ==
In Manchuria, the anti-Japanese fervor that had been growing since the March 1st Movement was followed by a growing mood to fight against Japanese imperialism by force. Therefore, small independent warlords in Manchuria attempted to enter Korea. At this time, large and small independence armies were organized in the Manchuria region, and the Korean Independence Army led by Hong Beom-do in eastern Manchuria, the Nationalist Army led by An Mu, and the Gunmu Dokbu Army commanded by Choi Jin-dong were linked and united with each other from the early 1920s . The first victory at the Battle of Samdunja boosted the morale of the Korean Independence Army and served as an opportunity to win the Battle of Bongo-dong that took place soon afterward.

The Battle of Samdunja was the independence army's first attempt to invade the country. At the time, the Japanese military regarded them as a threatening force and was seeking defense measures in response to the independence army's entry into the country and the active activities of the independence army appearing in the border area after the March 1st Movement in 1919, so the Battle of Gangyang-dong served as an opportunity for the Japanese army to take action to subdue the independence army.

== Significance ==
The Battle of Samdunja was a small-scale domestic entry operation that the Korean Independence Army had been carrying out until now, and it became the trigger. At the same time, it also set a precedent for the Japanese military to illegally invade China.

== See also ==
- Battle of Fengwudong
- Battle of Qingshanli
- Korean Independence Movement
  - List of militant Korean independence activist organizations
