= Lincoln High School (Milwaukee, Wisconsin) =

High school in Milwaukee, U.S.

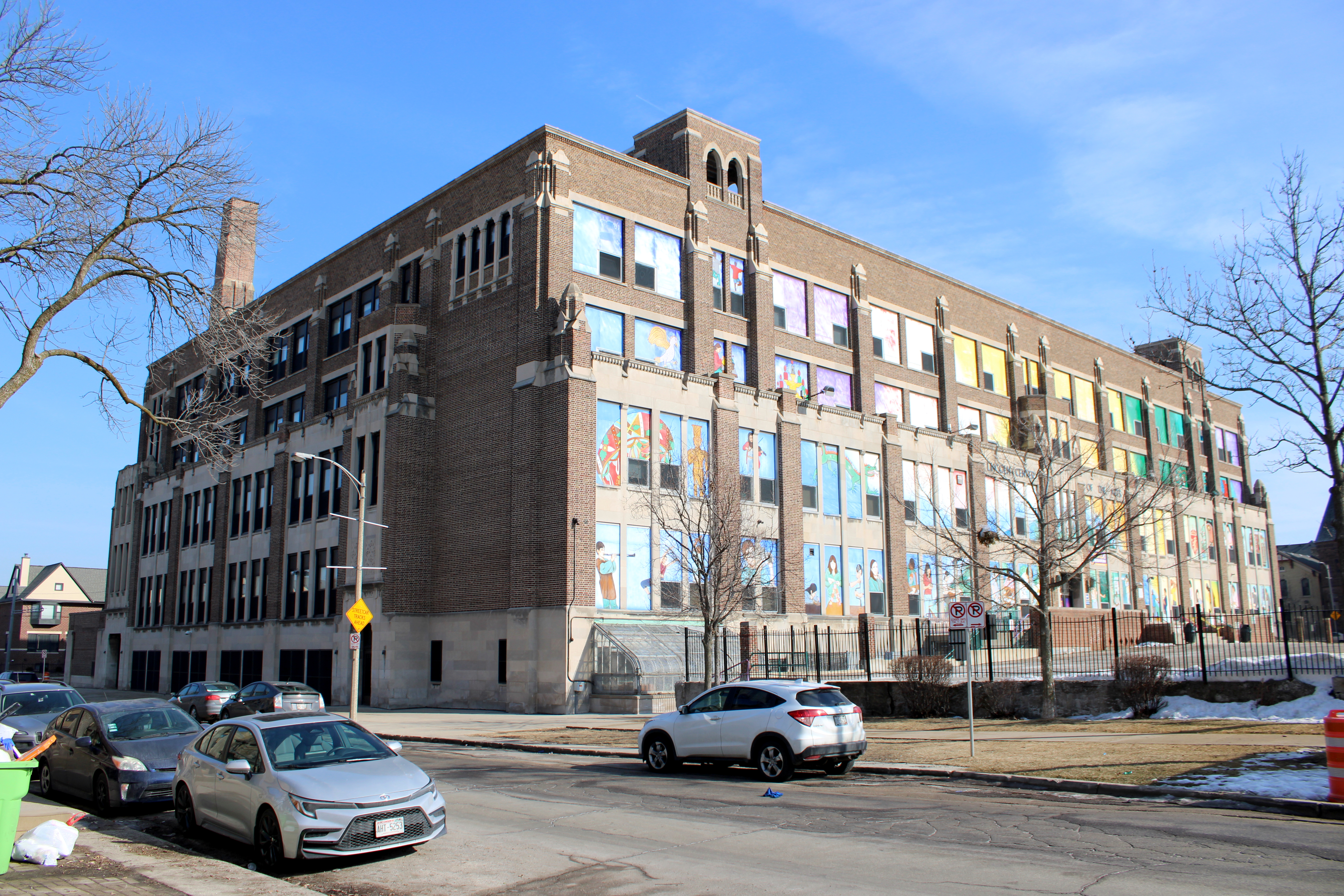
Lincoln Center of the Arts in 2026

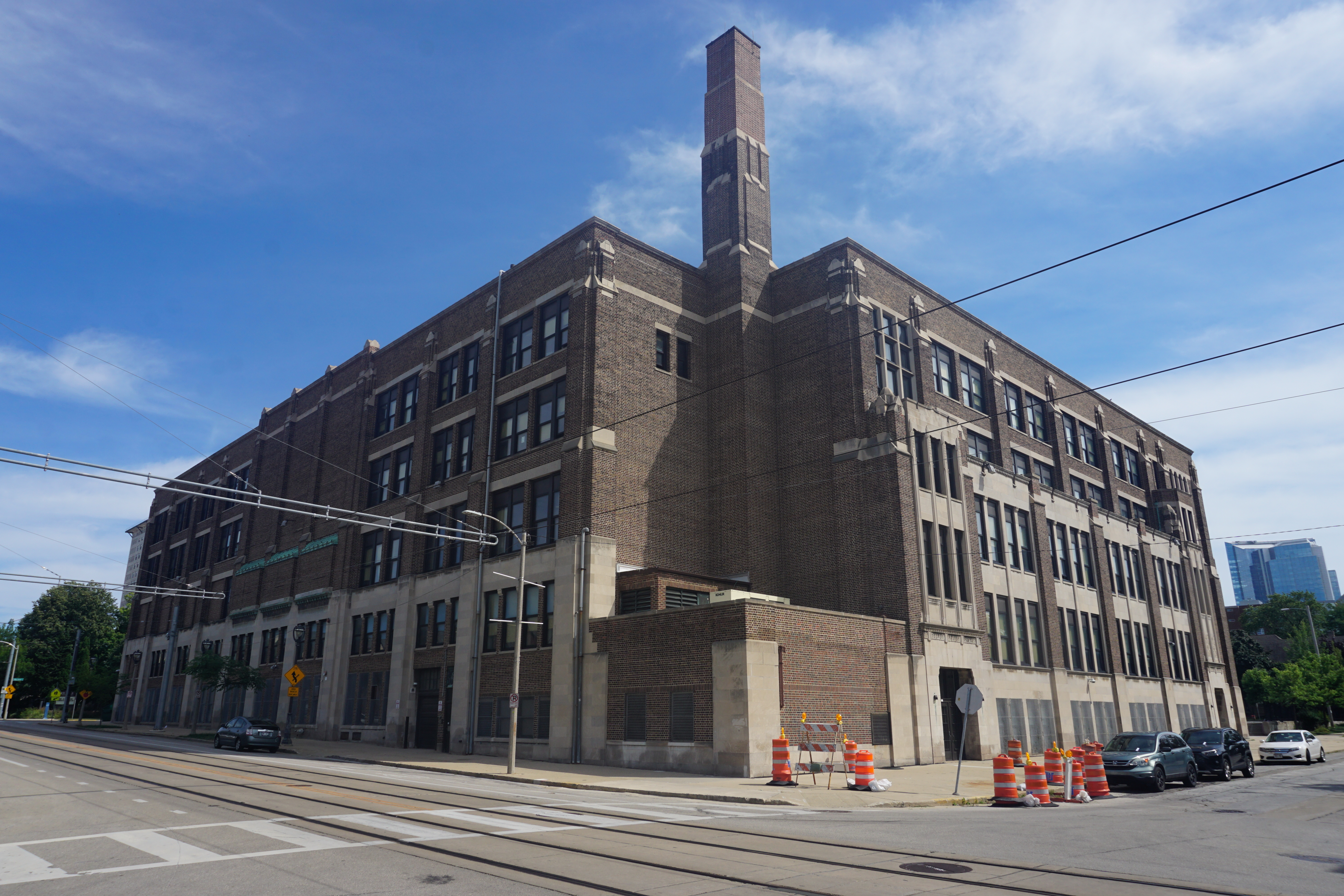
Lincoln Center of the Arts in 2022

Lincoln High School was a public high school in Milwaukee, Wisconsin at the corner of Cass and Knapp Streets. It was a part of the Milwaukee Public Schools system.

It was created in 1920 after the former East Division High School (now Riverside University High School) was moved to new quarters on the east side of the Milwaukee River in 1915.

The high school (by then the smallest high school in the MPS system) was disbanded at the end of the 1979 school year. The building now houses Lincoln Center for the Arts, a middle school.

Lincoln won state championships in the small-school division of boys' cross country in 1953, 1954, 1958 and 1963.

== Notable alumni and faculty ==
- Joseph F. Bellante, Jr., politician
- Fred Brown, aka "Downtown Freddie" Brown, NBA Player, First Team All American at University of Iowa
- Robert Bloch, writer
- Elizabeth M. Coggs, politician
- Lee Holloway, politician
- Al Jarreau, singer
- Gus Menos, politician
- Oprah Winfrey, talk show host
- Bruno Gaido, World War II Distinguished Flying Cross recipient
- Frank Balistrieri, mobster
