= Task Force 11 =

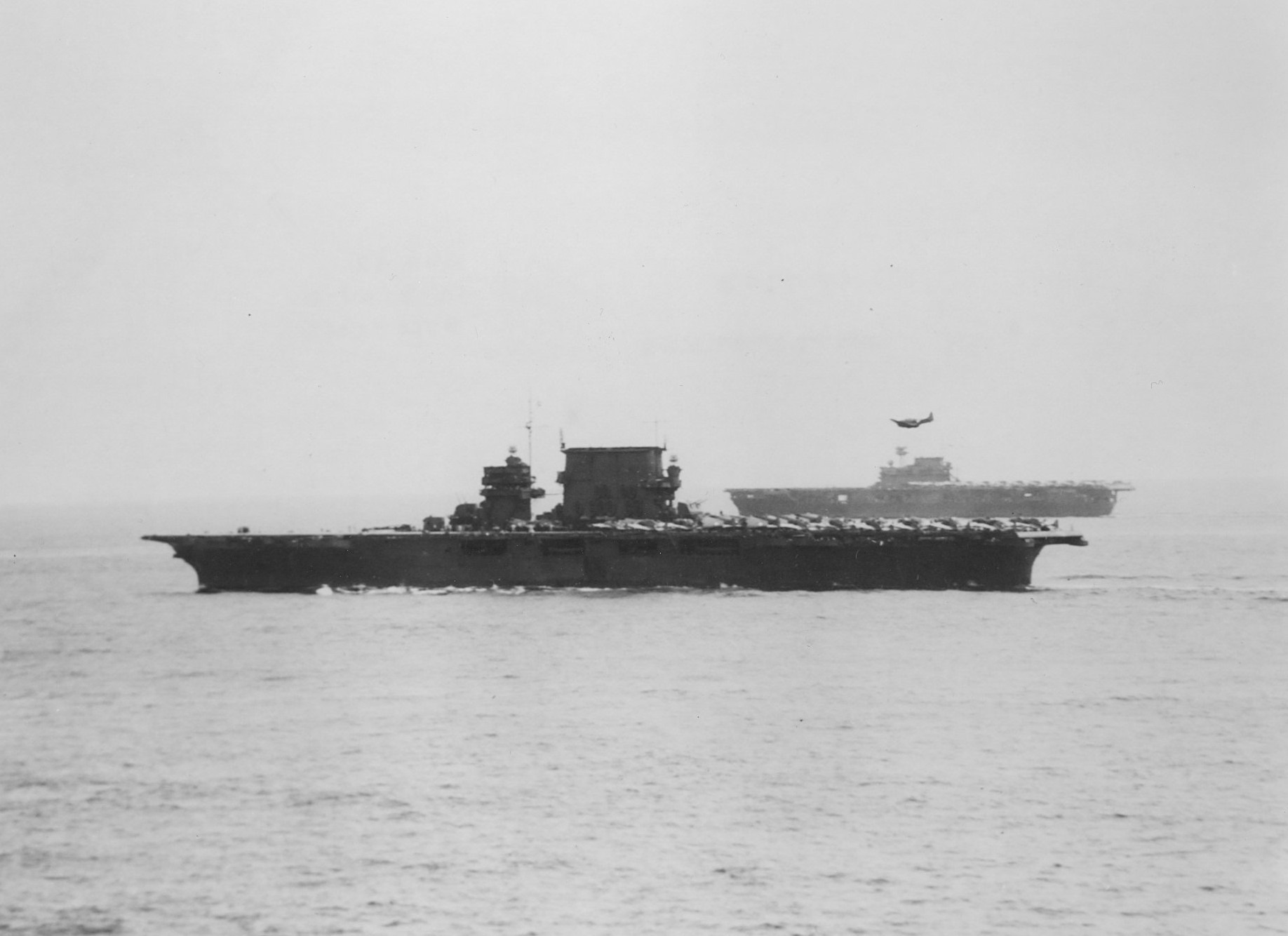
- TF 11's Saratoga (foreground) conducts aircraft operations with Task Force 16's Enterprise in the South Pacific in August 1942.
- Active: At least 1941–45, 2001–?
- Country: United States
- Allegiance: Allies of World War II
- Branch: United States Navy
- Engagements: Action off Bougainville; Battle of the Coral Sea; Battle of the Eastern Solomons; Marshall Islands Campaign

Commanders
- Notable commanders: Aubrey Fitch; Frank Jack Fletcher

Task Force 11 (TF 11 or alternately Commander Task Force 11, CTF 11) is a designation that has been used by the United States armed forces for two separate units.

== World War II ==
During World War II, Task Force 11 was a United States Navy aircraft carrier task force in the Pacific theater. After the attack on Pearl Harbor in December 1941, Destroyer Squadron 1 was attached to the task force, which was under the command of Vice Admiral Wilson Brown, made up of the aircraft carrier USS Lexington (CV-2) and the heavy cruisers USS Indianapolis (CA-35), USS Chicago (CA-29), and USS Portland (CA-33). On 14 December 1941, after delays due to bad weather, the task force cleared Pearl Harbor, Hawaii, as a diversion for an expedition under Rear Admiral Frank J. Fletcher in the aircraft carrier USS Saratoga (CV-3) to relieve Wake Island.

Originally formed around Lexington, TF 11 then was formed around her sister ship Saratoga until Saratoga was torpedoed and disabled by the Imperial Japanese Navy submarine I-6 on 11 January 1942. It then was formed around Lexington again for the Battle of the Coral Sea in which Lexington was sunk in early May 1942, then again around Saratoga after her repairs were completed.

TF 11 – as part of Task Force 61 along with Task Force 16 – was involved in the Battle of the Eastern Solomons in late August 1942, but Saratoga was again crippled by a submarine, and the task force shrank to just the carrier and some destroyers.

In September 1943, TF 11 was reorganized around the light aircraft carriers USS Princeton (CVL-23) and USS Belleau Wood (CVL-24) under Rear Admiral Willis A. Lee and supported landings on Baker Island and Howland Island. In early 1944, its task groups TG 11.1 and 11.2, now consisting of escort carriers, supported operations in the Marshall Islands.

== War on Terrorism ==
Task Force 11 was also the first designation given to the United States special operations forces composite grouping which has pursued terrorist high-value targets in Afghanistan and Iraq since October 2001. The grouping has been redesignated multiple times to avoid information leakages. Task Force 11 (seemingly in reference to 11 September) was only the first title used. It also used the title 'Task Force Sword' at the same time.

Initially it operated under the United States Joint Special Operations Command in Afghanistan searching for senior Taliban and al-Qaeda leaders. The unit included elements from Canada's JTF2 as well. JSOC frequently changed the name of the task force, and it has been designated Task Force 6-26, Task Force 121, and Task Force 145 with one of its most recently recorded names being Task Force 88.
