= Michitaro Tozuka =

Michitarō Tozuka
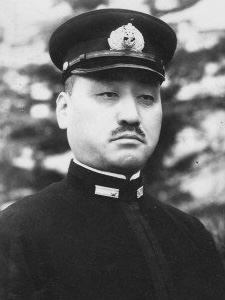
- Native name: 戸塚 道太郎
- Born: April 21, 1890; Tokyo, Japan
- Died: March 6, 1966 (aged 75)
- Allegiance: Empire of Japan
- Branch: Imperial Japanese Navy
- Service years: 1910–1945
- Rank: Vice Admiral
- Commands: Imperial Japanese Navy Aviation Bureau; Yokosuka Naval Air Group; Northeast Area Fleet
- Conflicts: Second Sino-Japanese War; World War II

Michitarō Tozuka (戸塚 道太郎, Tozuka Michitarō; April 21, 1890 – March 6, 1966) was a vice admiral in the Imperial Japanese Navy in World War II.

== Biography ==
Tozuka was a native of the former Sendagaya Village in Tokyo, now part of Shibuya. He graduated 33rd out of 149 cadets in the 38th class of the Imperial Japanese Naval Academy in July 1910. He served his midshipman tour on the armored cruiser Asama on its circumpacific voyage to Honolulu, San Francisco, Acapulco and Panama. Heb was subsequently assigned to Kurama and Naniwa. After attending gunnery and torpedo schools, he was promoted to lieutenant in 1913, and assigned to Kasagi. During World War I, he was attending junior officer courses at Naval Staff College, from which he emerged in 1917. He subsequently served on Tsushima, Mishima, and Hirado. He returned to the Naval Staff College in 1920, graduating 23rd out of 26 students, and with the rank of lieutenant commander. He subsequently served on the Ōi, Kiso and as cadet instructor on the training cruiser Iwate on its Shanghai – Hong Kong – Manila – Singapore – Batavia – Fremantle – Adelaide – Melbourne - Hobart - Sydney – Wellington - Auckland - Suva - Truk - Saipan voyage of 1925.

On his return, Tozuka was promoted to commander, and in 1928 was sent to Europe and the United States for a year to tour various countries and to learn about their naval operations. On his return, he served as Chief of staff of the Sasebo Naval District, and in 1931, received his first command: Tama. From 1932-1933, he served on the Imperial Japanese Navy General Staff, returning to sea as captain of Nachi.

In 1936, Tozuka was given command of the Tateyama Naval Air Detachment. This became the IJN 1st Air Fleet in 1937, and was subordinated to the China Area Fleet with the start of the China Incident. The same year, Tozuka was promoted to rear admiral. He is noted for pioneering transoceanic bombing from the Japanese home islands to Shanghai at the start of the Second Sino-Japanese War. Tozuka remained involved with naval aviation for the rest of his career, commanding the 1st, 2nd, and 12th Air Fleets into World War II; he also was commander of both carrier air wings involved in the attack on Pearl Harbor on 7 December 1941. On 4–5 August 1943, Imperial General Headquarters reorganized the military command structure in the North Pacific Ocean, abolishing the Northern Area Force and placing him in command of a new Northeast Area Fleet, which combined the forces of the 5th Fleet and the 12th Air Fleet and was responsible for the defense of the Kurile Islands. In September 1944, he became commander in chief of the Imperial Japanese Navy Air Service. In May 1945, he became final commander of the Yokosuka Naval District, which he formally surrendered to Rear Admiral Robert Carney, acting for Fleet Admiral William Halsey, Jr., and Rear Admiral Oscar C. Badger II on 28 August 1945.

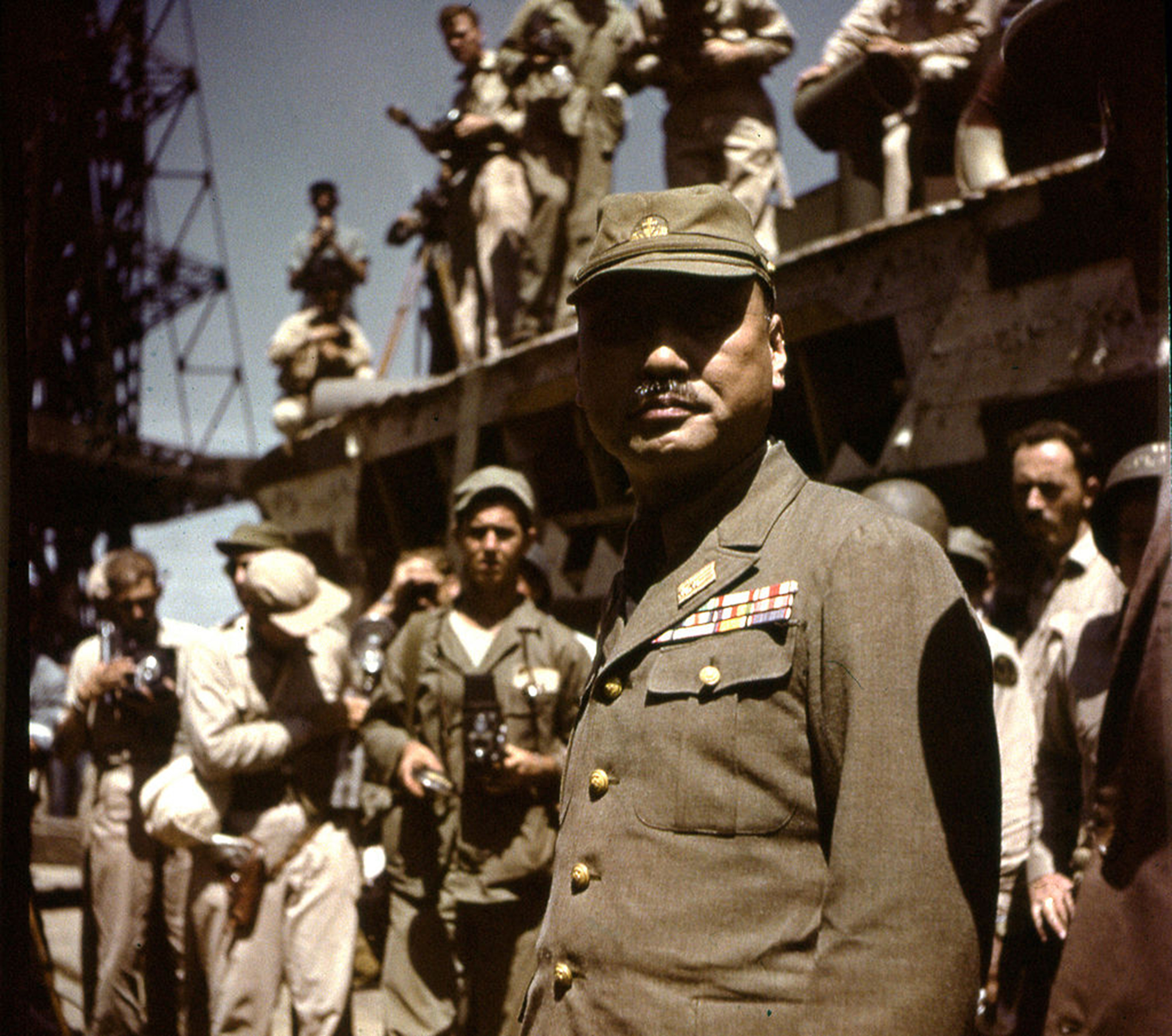
Vice Admiral Tozuka shortly after surrendering Yokosuka Naval Base to the United States, August 30, 1945

After the war, Tozuka went into retirement, but was later called upon by the post-war Japanese government to assist in the establishment of the naval academy of the Japanese Maritime Self-Defense Force. He also served as an honorary professor at Senshu University and assisted in establishing air routes for Japan Airlines. He died in 1966.

Military offices
Preceded by None; Fleet created	Commander-in-chief of the Northeast Area Fleet; 5 August 1943 - 15 September 1944	Succeeded by Gotō Eiji
Preceded by Tsukahara Nishizō	Commander-in-chief of Yokosuka Naval District; 1 May 1945 - 20 November 1945	Succeeded by None; Komura Keizō served as Acting Commander-in-Chief until 30 November 1945
