= Joseph F. Bellante Jr. =

American politician (1932–2011)

Joseph F. Bellante Jr. (December 6, 1932 – April 28, 2011) was an American educator and politician.

== Biography ==
Bellante was born on December 6, 1932, in Villa San Giovanni, Italy. He traveled to America by ship when he was only 6 years of age for his family to seek a better life. He graduated from Lincoln High School in Milwaukee, Wisconsin before graduating from the University of Wisconsin–Milwaukee. During the Korean War, he served in the United States Army. Bellante was an elementary school teacher. In 1967, Bellante served in the Wisconsin State Assembly and was a Republican from Milwaukee, Wisconsin. From 1980 to 1996, Bellante served on the Norway, Wisconsin Town Board. Then from 1996 until his death in 2011, Bellante served on the Racine County, Wisconsin Board of Supervisors. Bellante died suddenly on April 28, 2011, leaving behind his son Joe Bellante III and his grandson Joseph Bellante IV.
