= Marshalls–Gilberts raids =

1942 US naval offensive during World War II

- Part of the Pacific War and World War II
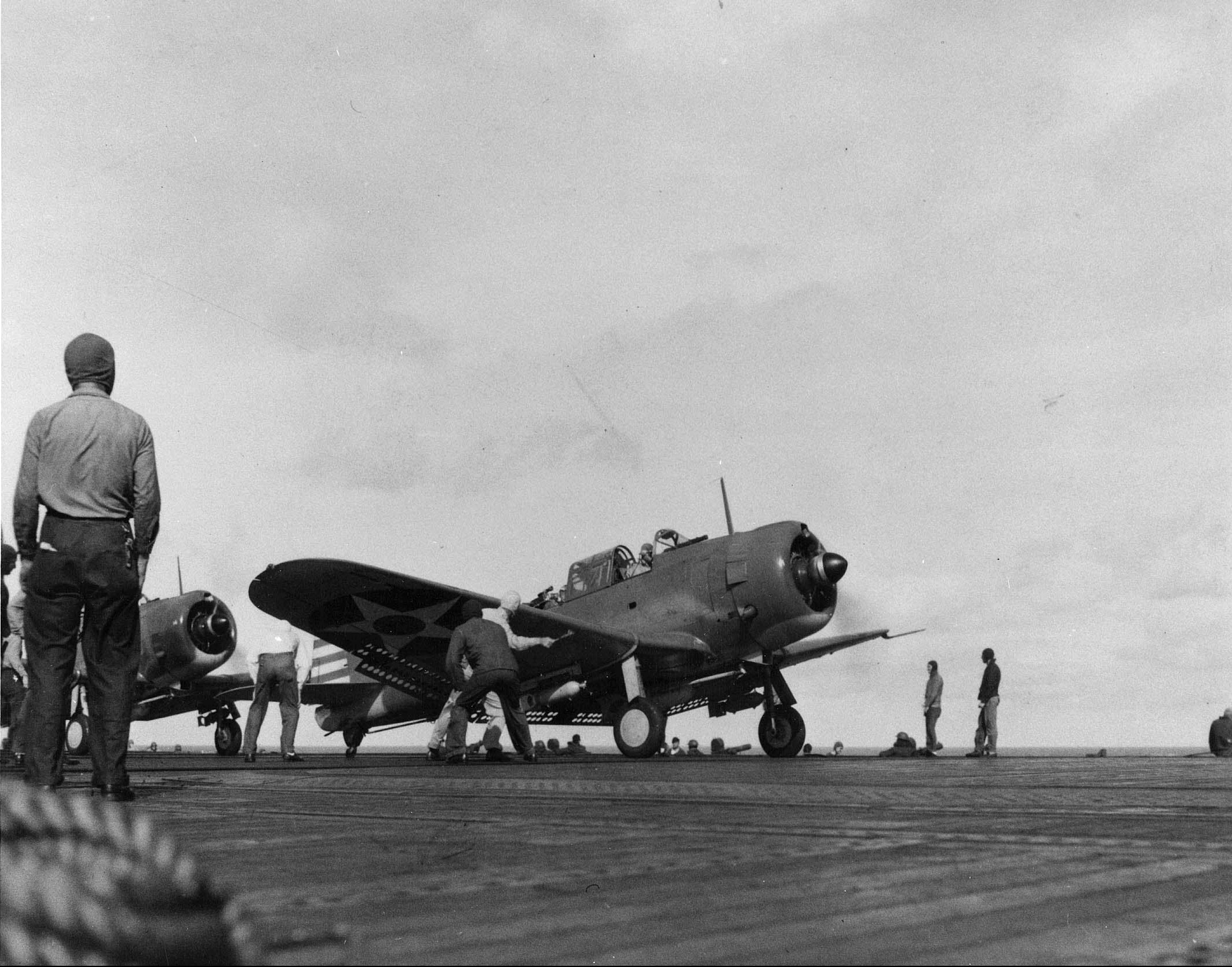
- A bomb-laden SBD-2 Dauntless dive bomber prepares to take off from the U.S. carrier Enterprise during the raids on February 1.
| Date | February 1, 1942 |
| Location | Marshall and Gilbert Islands, Micronesia 10.000°N 170.000°E |
| Result | Minor damage to Japanese garrisons |

Belligerents
| United States; Gilbert and Ellice Islands | Japan |

Commanders and leaders
| William Halsey, Jr. Frank Jack Fletcher | Shigeyoshi Inoue; Eiji Gotō |

Units involved
| Task Force 17 | 4th Fleet; 24th Air Flotilla |

Strength
| 2 aircraft carriers, 133 aircraft 4 heavy cruisers 1 light cruiser 12 destroyers 2 replenishment oilers | 51 aircraft |

Casualties and losses
| 1 cruiser damaged, 14 aircraft destroyed | 3 auxiliary ships sunk, 1 minelayer, 1 light cruiser damaged, 4 transports, 2 auxiliary ships damaged, 18 aircraft destroyed |

The Marshalls–Gilberts raids were tactical airstrikes and naval artillery attacks by United States Navy aircraft carrier and other warship forces against Imperial Japanese Navy (IJN) garrisons in the Marshall and Gilbert Islands on 1 February 1942. It was the first of six American raids against Japanese-held territories conducted in the first half of 1942 as part of a strategy.

== Units and commanders ==
The Japanese garrisons were under the overall command of Vice Admiral Shigeyoshi Inoue, commander of the 4th Fleet. Japanese aircraft in the islands belonged to the IJN's 24th Air Flotilla under Rear Admiral Eiji Gotō. The U.S. warship forces were under the overall command of Vice Admiral William Halsey Jr.

== Raids ==
The raids were carried out by two separate U.S. carrier task forces. Aircraft from Task Force 17 (TF 17), commanded by Rear Admiral Frank Jack Fletcher and centered on the carrier USS Yorktown, attacked Jaluit, Mili, and Makin (Butaritari) islands. The Yorktown aircraft inflicted moderate damage to the Japanese naval installations on the islands and destroyed three aircraft. Seven Yorktown aircraft were lost (4 TBD Devastators, 3 SBD Dauntlesses) as well as an SOC Seagull floatplane from USS Louisville, one of TF 17's cruisers.

Aircraft from TF 8, commanded by Halsey and centered on the carrier USS Enterprise, struck Kwajalein, Wotje, and Taroa. At the same time, cruisers and destroyers bombarded Wotje and Taroa. The strikes inflicted light to moderate damage on the three islands' naval garrisons, sank three small warships and damaged several others, including the light cruiser Katori, and destroyed 15 Japanese aircraft. The heavy cruiser USS Chester was hit and slightly damaged by a Japanese aerial bomb, the Enterprise caught fire after a near miss by a bomb, and six Enterprise aircraft - five SBD Dauntless dive bombers and one F4F Wildcat fighter - were lost. Additionally, a float plane from USS Salt Lake City was damaged during recovery and was abandoned and sunk. TF 8 and TF 17 retired from the area immediately upon completion of the raids.

== Aftermath and significance ==
The raids had little long-term strategic impact. The IJN briefly sent two aircraft carriers to chase TF 8 and TF 17 but quickly abandoned the pursuit and continued their support for the ongoing successful conquests of the Philippines and Netherlands East Indies. The raids, however, did help lift the morale of the U.S. Navy and the American public, still reeling from the Pearl Harbor attack and the loss of Wake Island. The raids also provided valuable experience in carrier air operations, which hardened the U.S. carrier groups for future combat against Japanese forces.

For their part the Japanese apparently did not realize that their concept of a perimeter defense using dispersed island garrisons had serious flaws in that the garrisons were too far apart to be sufficiently mutually supporting to prevent penetration by enemy carrier forces. Nevertheless the raids, along with the Doolittle Raid in April 1942, helped convince the IJN's Combined Fleet commander, Isoroku Yamamoto, that he needed to draw the American carriers into battle as soon as possible in order to destroy them. Yamamoto's plan to do so resulted in the Battle of Midway.
