= Japanese destroyer Makigumo (1941) =

Yūgumo-class destroyer

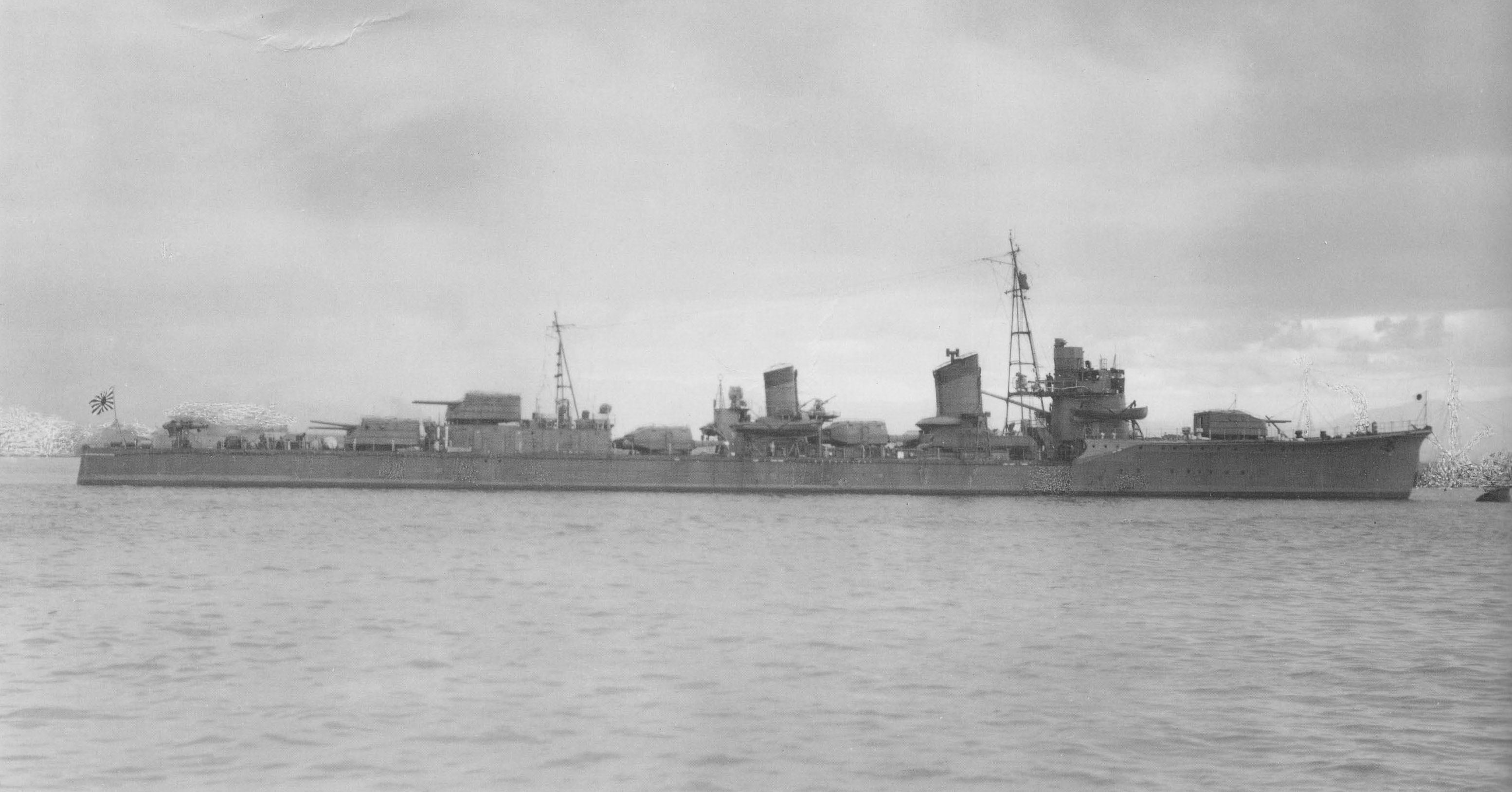
- Makigumo on 14 March 1942

History

Empire of Japan
- Name: Makigumo
- Builder: Fujinagata Shipyards, Osaka
- Laid down: 23 December 1940
- Launched: 5 November 1941
- Completed: 14 March 1942
- Stricken: 1 March 1943
- Fate: Scuttled, 1 February 1943

General characteristics
- Class & type: Yūgumo-class destroyer
- Displacement: 2,520 long tons (2,560 t)
- Length: 119.15 m (390 ft 11 in)
- Beam: 10.8 m (35 ft 5 in)
- Draught: 3.75 m (12 ft 4 in)
- Speed: 35 knots (40 mph; 65 km/h)
- Complement: 228
- Armament: 6 × 127 mm (5.0 in)/50 caliber DP guns; up to 28 × Type 96 25 mm (0.98 in) AA guns; up to 4 × 13.2 mm (0.52 in) AA guns; 8 × 610 mm (24 in) torpedo tubes for Type 93 torpedoes; 36 depth charges

Makigumo (巻雲) was a Yūgumo-class destroyer of the Imperial Japanese Navy. Her name means "Cirrus Clouds" (Rolling Clouds).

== Design and description ==
The Yūgumo class was a repeat of the preceding Kagerō class with minor improvements that increased their anti-aircraft capabilities. Their crew numbered 228 officers and enlisted men. The ships measured 119.17 meters (391 ft 0 in) overall, with a beam of 10.8 meters (35 ft 5 in) and a draft of 3.76 meters (12 ft 4 in). They displaced 2,110 metric tons (2,080 long tons) at standard load and 2,560 metric tons (2,520 long tons) at deep load. The ships had two Kampon geared steam turbines, each driving one propeller shaft, using steam provided by three Kampon water-tube boilers. The turbines were rated at a total of 52,000 shaft horsepower (39,000 kW) for a designed speed of 35 knots (65 km/h; 40 mph).

The main armament of the Yūgumo class consisted of six Type 3 127-millimeter (5.0 in) guns in three twin-gun turrets, one superfiring pair aft and one turret forward of the superstructure. The guns were able to elevate up to 75° to increase their ability against aircraft, but their slow rate of fire, slow traversing speed, and the lack of any sort of high-angle fire-control system meant that they were virtually useless as anti-aircraft guns. They were built with four Type 96 25-millimeter (1.0 in) anti-aircraft guns in two twin-gun mounts, but more of these guns were added over the course of the war. The ships were also armed with eight 610-millimeter (24.0 in) torpedo tubes in a two quadruple traversing mounts; one reload was carried for each tube. Their anti-submarine weapons comprised two depth charge throwers for which 36 depth charges were carried.

== Career ==
Following the Battle of Midway in June 1942, downed American aircrew SBD Ensign Frank W. O'Flaherty and AMM1c Bruno Gaido were pulled from the water by Makigumo. After an interrogation, the crew tied weights around the feet of O'Flaherty and Gaido and threw them into the Pacific to drown, instead of keeping them prisoner until they reached Japan. Makigumo's crew thought of it as payback for the loss in the battle of Midway of the aircraft carriers Akagi, Kaga, Sōryū, and Hiryū, which had formed two-thirds of the Kidō Butai Pearl Harbor attack force.

Shortly after the Battle of the Santa Cruz Islands during the early hours of 27 October 1942, Makigumo along with the destroyer Akigumo sank the heavily damaged and abandoned aircraft carrier USS Hornet. US destroyers had attempted to sink Hornet earlier but failed to do so before Japanese naval forces forced the US ships to withdraw. Despite this, the Japanese failed in their mission to bombard Henderson Field. The following day, Makigumo rescued a downed American airman, ARM3c Michael "Mick" Glasser from USS Enterprise, but unlike O'Flaherty and Gaido, Glasser was taken aboard and transferred to Truk and then to Japan, where he remained a Prisoner of War until the war ended.

On 1 February 1943, Makigumo was on a troop evacuation run to Guadalcanal. While maneuvering to avoid a PT boat attack, she struck a mine. The destroyer Yūgumo removed 237 survivors, including Cdr Isamu Fujita, and scuttled Makigumo with a torpedo, 3 miles (4.8 km) south-southwest of Savo Island (09°15′S 159°47′E).

== Bibliography ==
- Campbell, John (1985). Naval Weapons of World War II. Annapolis, Maryland: Naval Institute Press. ISBN 0-87021-459-4.
- Jentschura, Hansgeorg; Jung, Dieter & Mickel, Peter (1977). Warships of the Imperial Japanese Navy, 1869–1945. Annapolis, Maryland: United States Naval Institute. ISBN 0-87021-893-X.
- Sturton, Ian (1980). "Japan". In Chesneau, Roger (ed.). Conway's All the World's Fighting Ships 1922–1946. Greenwich, UK: Conway Maritime Press. pp. 167–217. ISBN 0-85177-146-7.
- Whitley, M. J. (1988). Destroyers of World War Two. Annapolis, Maryland: Naval Institute Press. ISBN 0-87021-326-1.
