= Action off Bougainville =

Naval engagement of World War II

- Part of the Pacific Theater of World War II
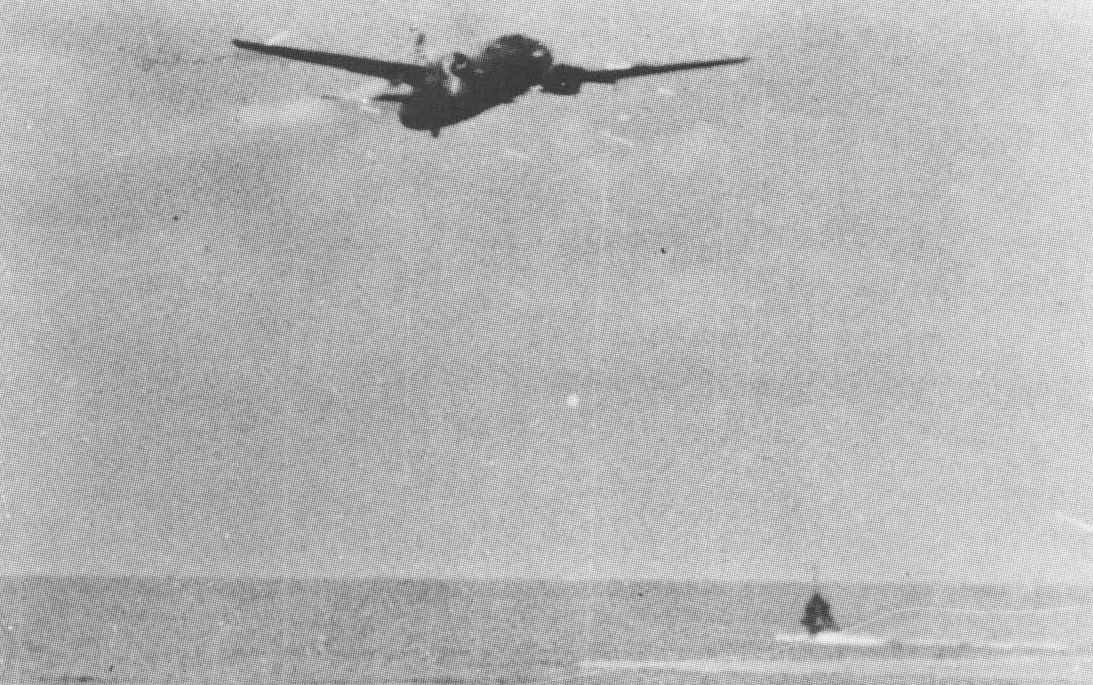
- Watanabe's plane attempting to crash into Lexington after the end of the attack. The bomber had already been badly damaged, losing the port engine nacelle due to fire from one of Lexington's fighters, piloted by Edward O'Hare, and had already expended its bombload previously, returned to attempt a ramming attack on the carrier but crashed shortly after this moment off the carrier's stern.
Date	20 February 1942
Location	450 mi (390 nmi; 720 km) east of Bougainville, Territory of New Guinea
Result	Japanese air group takes heavy losses; American raid turned back

Belligerents
United States	Japan

Commanders and leaders
(United States) Wilson Brown (United States) Frederick Carl Sherman	(Empire of Japan) Shigeyoshi Inoue (Empire of Japan) Eiji Gotō

Strength
1 aircraft carrier 4 cruisers 10 destroyers 19 fighters	17 bombers 5 scouts

Casualties and losses
2 fighters destroyed 1 killed	19 aircraft destroyed 130 killed

The action off Bougainville was a naval and air engagement on the South Pacific Theater of World War II near Bougainville, Papua New Guinea on 20 February 1942. A United States Navy aircraft carrier task force on its way to raid the Imperial Japanese military base at Rabaul, New Britain was attacked by a force of land-based bombers of the Imperial Japanese Navy. The US task force was commanded by Admiral Wilson Brown and the Japanese aircraft forces were under the command of Eiji Gotō.

In the ensuing engagement, the Japanese 4th Kōkūtai lost 15 of 17 bombers sent to attack the American carrier group. The United States lost only two fighters in defence, and no ships were damaged. As a result of the loss of surprise, however, the Americans retired without raiding Rabaul as originally planned. Because of the heavy losses in bombers, the Japanese were forced to delay their planned invasion of New Guinea, giving the Allies more time to prepare defences against the Japanese advances in the South Pacific.

== Prelude ==
Following the capture of the port of Rabaul during the battle of Rabaul, Japanese forces proceeded to turn it into a major base. The allied command was concerned the fall of Rabaul threatened the San Francisco-Australia sea lane supply line and ordered the supply line to be patrolled. Admiral Chester William Nimitz and Admiral Brown devised a plan to solve the threat on the supply line by attacking the newly captured Rabaul. Task Force 11 (TF 11) and the ANZAC Squadron were tasked with undertaking the raid. Unfortunately, the ANZAC Squadron fuel oil supply was inadequate to accompany TF 11 to its launching point north-east of Rabaul for the planned 21 February air strike.

== Battle ==
TF 11 with the carrier Lexington detected an unknown aircraft on radar 35 mi (30 nmi; 56 km) from the ship at 10.15 while still 450 mi (390 nmi; 720 km) from the harbour at Rabaul. A six-plane combat patrol was launched with two fighters directed to investigate the contact. These two planes, under command of Lieutenant Commander Thach, shot down a four-engined Kawanishi H6K4 "Mavis" flying boat about 43 mi (37 nmi; 69 km) out at 11.12. Two other planes of the combat patrol were sent to another radar contact 35 mi (30 nmi; 56 km) ahead, and shot down a second "Mavis" at 12.02. A third contact was made 80 mi (70 nmi; 130 km) out, but that plane reversed course and disappeared.

The Japanese search planes alerted Rabaul to the presence of US naval forces in the area. Vice Admiral Shigeyoshi Inoue, at the Imperial Japanese Fourth Fleet headquarters in Truk, ordered an initial air strike to be conducted from Rabaul; and ordered the heavy cruisers Aoba, Furutaka, Kinugasa, and Kako of cruiser Division 6 to intercept TF 11.

Seventeen Japanese Mitsubishi G4M1 "Betty" bombers of the 4th Kōkūtai took off from Vunakanau Airfield, Rabaul to attack TF 11. When Admiral Brown realised he had lost the element of surprise, he broke off the attack against Rabaul and started to retire from the area. A jagged vee signal was detected on air-search radar at 15.42. The contact was briefly lost, but reappeared at 16.25 47 mi (41 nmi; 76 km) west. Six Grumman F4F-4 Wildcats from Lexington were sent to intercept the incoming targets, while Lexington launched four more and another six, preparing to land, stood off to await developments. Their targets proved to be the 4th Kōkūtai's 2nd Chûtai, led by Lieutenant Masayoshi Nakagawa. Five of the nine incoming "Bettys" were shot down or cut out of formation during the approach. One of these was Nakagawa's lead plane, the loss of which caused a delay to the attack run while command was passed to the next ranking pilot. The remaining four "Bettys" then turned into their run, but were then set upon by the six standby fighters. This, combined with Captain Frederick C. Sherman's adroit ship-handling, caused their bombs to land 3,000 yards short of the carrier.

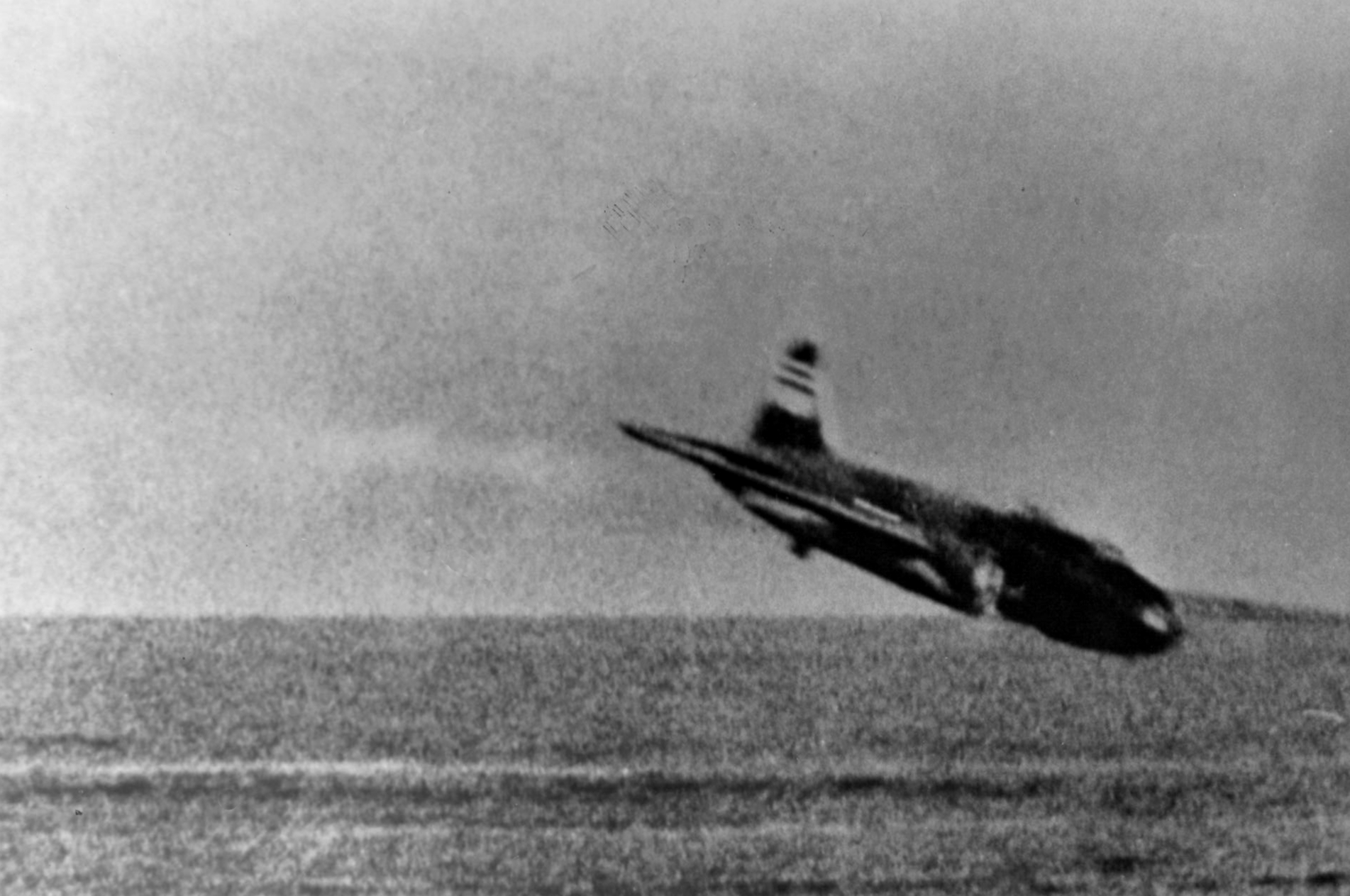
Nakagawa's bomber crashes into the ocean

Shortly afterwards, Nakagawa, still in control of his crippled plane, attempted to crash directly onto Lexington's flight deck. Sherman immediately put his stern to the attacker, while every available gun opened up on the incoming "Betty". Nakagawa's plane hit the water 75 yards astern of the carrier.

The remaining four "Bettys" attempted to clear the area, but were immediately swarmed by Wildcats. Three were shot down, at the cost of two F4Fs to return fire. The last managed to escape the fighters, but ran into an SBD piloted by VB-2's XO, Lieutenant Walter F. Henry. Henry overtook it and shot it down, leaving no survivors from the 2nd Chûtai. While returning to the carriers, Henry happened on a ditched bomber of the 2nd Air Group being abandoned by its crew, and promptly strafed its survivors.

A second formation of "Bettys" was detected by radar at 16.49, 12 mi (10 nmi; 19 km) out on the disengaged side of the task force. These were the 4th Kōkūtai's 1st Chûtai, led by the group CO, Lieutenant Commander Takuzo Ito. With the majority of fighters chasing the remains of the 2nd Chûtai, only two Wildcats, flown by Lieutenant Edward "Butch" O'Hare and Lieutenant (junior grade) Marion Dufilho, were available to confront the intruders. The two F4F pilots were directed eastward and arrived 1,500 feet (460 m) above eight "Bettys" (reported as nine) flying close together in V formation 9 mi (7.8 nmi; 14 km) out at 1700. During the first pass, Dufilho's guns jammed, leaving O'Hare to attack the bombers alone.

O'Hare employed a high-side diving attack from the right side of the formation, accurately placing bursts of gunfire into the outside "Betty"'s right engine and wing fuel tanks. When the stricken craft, commanded by Petty Officer 2nd Class Ryosuke Kogiku (3rd Shotai), lurched to starboard, O'Hare switched to the next plane up the line, that of Petty Officer 1st Class Koji Maeda (3rd Shotai leader). Maeda's plane caught fire, but his crew managed to put out the flames with "one single spurt of liquid...from the fire-extinguisher." Neither Maeda or Kogiku had sustained fatal damage, and would catch up with the group before bomb release.

With two "Bettys" knocked out of formation (albeit temporarily), O'Hare initiated another firing pass, this time from the left side. His first target was the outside plane, flown by Petty Officer 1st Class Bin Mori (2nd Shotai). Aiming across to the far side of Mori's bomber, O'Hare's bullets damaged the right engine and left fuel tank, forcing Mori to dump his bombs and abort his mission. With Mori out of combat, O'Hare next targeted Ito's senior wingman, Petty Officer 1st Class Susumu Uchiyama (1st Shotai), whose plane did not recover from its dive.

Having shot up four bombers, O'Hare returned to the left side for a third firing pass. By now, Ito was nearing the bomb release point, which left very little time to take action. The first plane to go down was Ito's deputy, Lieutenant (junior grade) Akira Mitani (2nd Shotai leader). Mitani's departure left Ito's command plane exposed, and O'Hare opened up on it. O'Hare's concentrated fire caused the plane's port engine nacelle to break free of the wing. The resulting explosion was so violent that the 1st Chûtai pilots were convinced that an AA burst had struck their commander's plane. With a gaping hole in its left wing, Ito's plane fell out of formation.

Shortly afterwards, O'Hare made another firing pass against Maeda (who had now caught up), but ran out of ammunition before he could finish him. Frustrated, he pulled away to allow the ships to fire their anti-aircraft guns. O'Hare believed he had shot down six bombers and damaged a seventh. Captain Sherman would later reduce this to five, as four of the reported nine bombers were still overhead when he pulled out. In fact, he had only shot down three bombers - Uchiyama's, Mitani's, and Ito's - a total backed up by his own CO. Lieutenant Commander John Thach, hurrying towards the scene with reinforcements after mopping up the 2nd Chûtai, arrived in time to see three enemy bombers falling in flames simultaneously.

With Ito knocked out, the remaining four pilots dropped their bombs, three of them targeting Lexington. Despite the last-minute disruption, the 1st Chûtai had set up their run much better than the 2nd, planting their nearest bomb just 100 feet astern of Lexington. Maeda, however, was unable to line up properly, and instead released his bombs on the cruiser Minneapolis. They missed 100 yards to port.

As the surviving "Bettys" withdrew, Ito's command pilot, Warrant Officer Chuzo Watanabe, managed to regain enough control to level his plane. He tried to steer his damaged plane into Lexington, but missed and flew into the water near the carrier at 17:12. Maeda, witnessing the event, believed that both Ito and Mitani (who had gone down moments earlier) had crashed "bombs, crew and all" into the carrier.

Although O'Hare could no longer shoot, the remaining 1st Chûtai pilots were not out of danger. A fourth, flown by Petty Officer 2nd Class Tokiharu Baba (2nd Shotai), was brought down eight miles out by Thach's wingman, Ensign Edward R. Sellstrom. Of the remaining four, Petty Officer 1st Class Kosuke Ono (1st Shotai) was badly shot up during the retreat, and forced to crash-land on Nugava Island at 19:25 with several dead crewmembers. Maeda and Kogiku managed to reach Vunakanau at 19.50, while Mori, lost in a storm, ditched at Simpson Harbor at 20.10.

== Aftermath ==
As a result of the loss of surprise, Brown cancelled the planned raid on Rabaul and retired from the area. Because of the high losses in bomber aircraft, the Japanese postponed their impending invasion of Lae-Salamaua, Papua New Guinea from 3–8 March 1942.

Two "Mavis" flying boats were also shot down which were shadowing the US force, as well as two other Japanese scout aircraft lost in operational accidents while participating in the day's action. The US lost two fighters to defensive gunfire from the bombers, but one pilot survived, while no damage was inflicted on the US warships. O'Hare was awarded the Medal of Honor for his actions.
