= Aviation machinist's mate =

United States Navy aircraft engine mechanic

Aviation Machinist's Mate (AD)
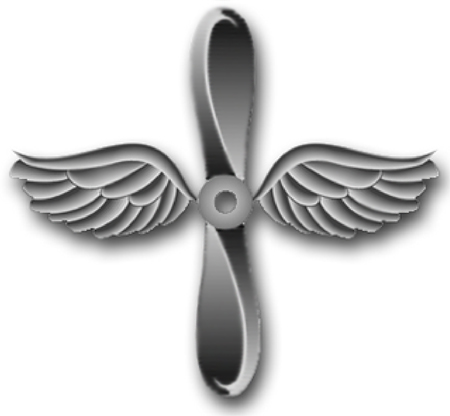
- AD rating insignia
- Issued by: United States Navy
- Type: Enlisted rating
- Abbreviation: AD
- Specialty: Aviation propulsion systems

Aviation Machinist's Mates (abbreviated as AD) are United States Navy aircraft engine mechanics that inspect, adjust, test, repair, and overhaul aircraft engines and propellers. More specifically, ADs install, maintain, and service various aircraft engine types as well as various accessories, gear boxes, related fuel systems, and lubrication systems; determine reasons for engine degradation using various test equipment; perform propeller repairs; handle and service aircraft ashore or aboard ship; and can also serve as aircrewman in various types of aircraft.

== History ==
In the early stages of Naval Aviation, this occupation was performed by Machinist's Mates with an aviation specialty, but qualifying for the aviation specialty required meeting the standards for the general rating as well as those required for the aviation specialty.

The Aviation Machinist's Mate rating was established on July 1, 1921, along with Aviation Metalsmith, Aviation Carpenter's Mate, and Aviation Rigger. These were the first ratings used specifically for aviation and based solely on aviation requirements. Aviation Machinist's Mate is the only one of the four that is still in use today, making it the oldest U.S. Naval Aviation Rating still in service.

In April, 1948, the rating's abbreviation was changed from AMM to AD, but the insignia has not changed since 1921.

== Aviation Machinist’s Mate functional areas ==
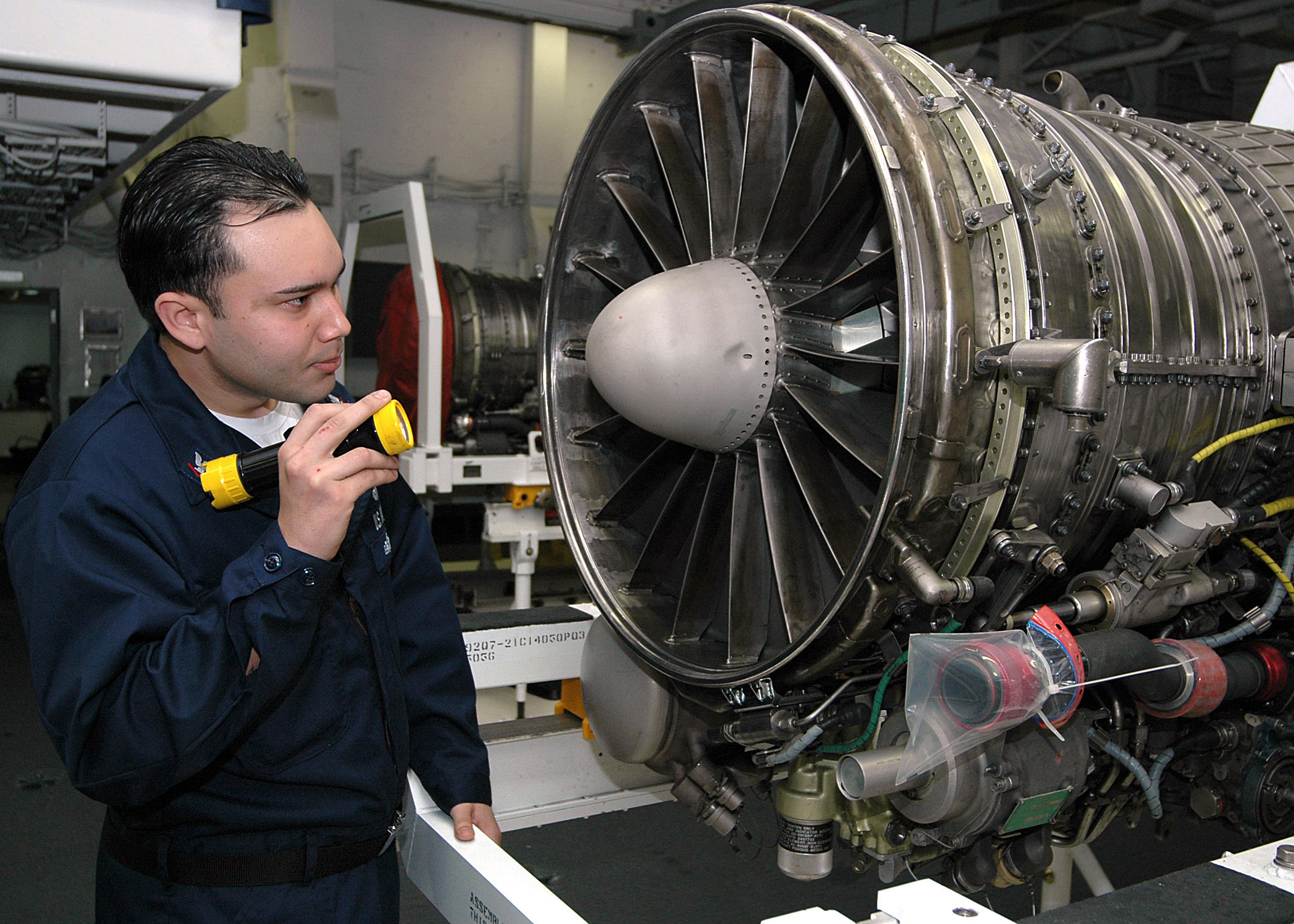
Aviation Machinist's Mate 3rd Class (AD3) Moreao Salinas inspecting a jet engine for foreign object damage in the jet shop on board USS George Washington (CVN-73).

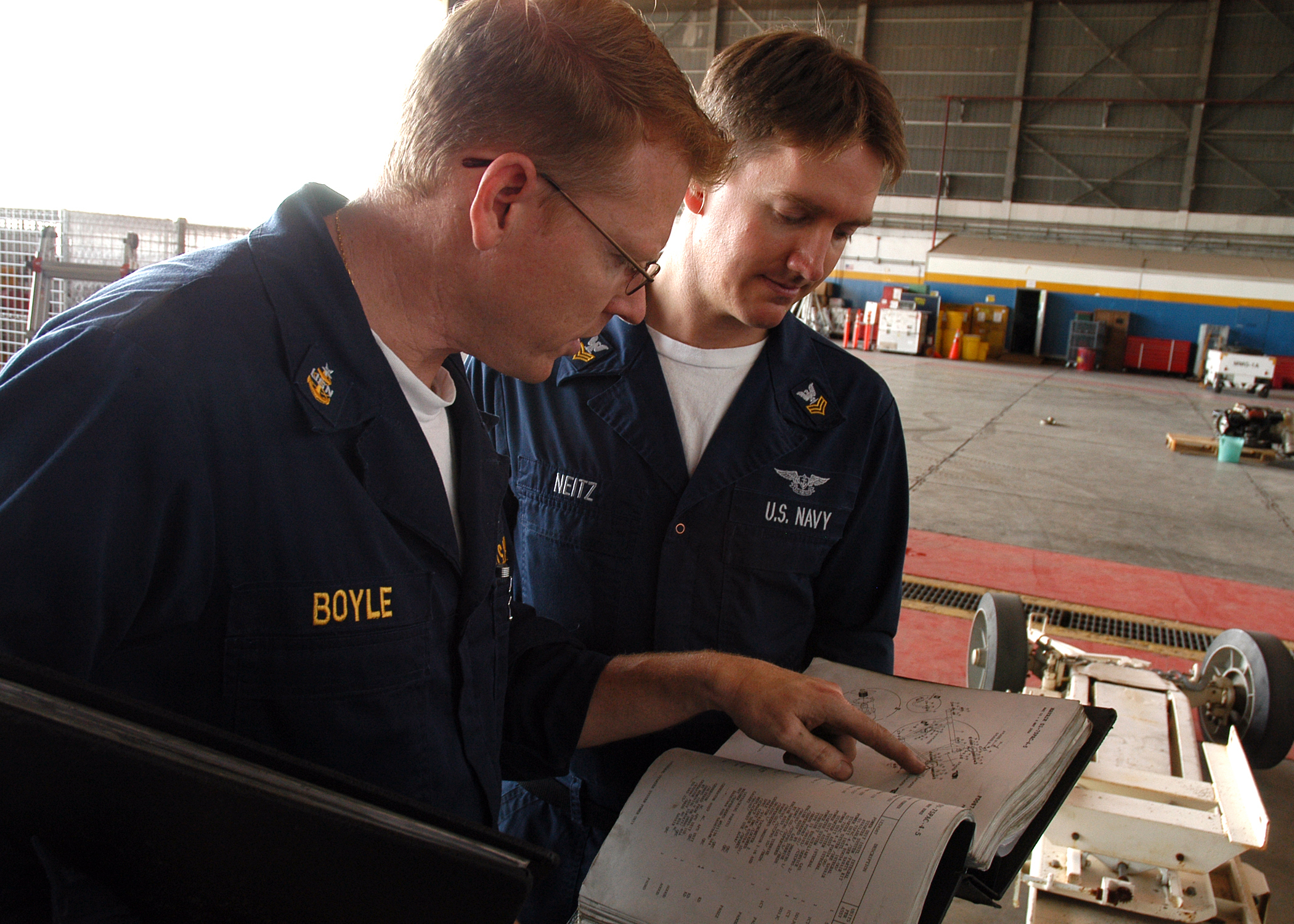
ADCS Bruce Boyle and AD1 Stephen Neitz from VP-16 reference a technical manual for proper installation of an auxiliary power unit on a P-3C Orion at an undisclosed location.

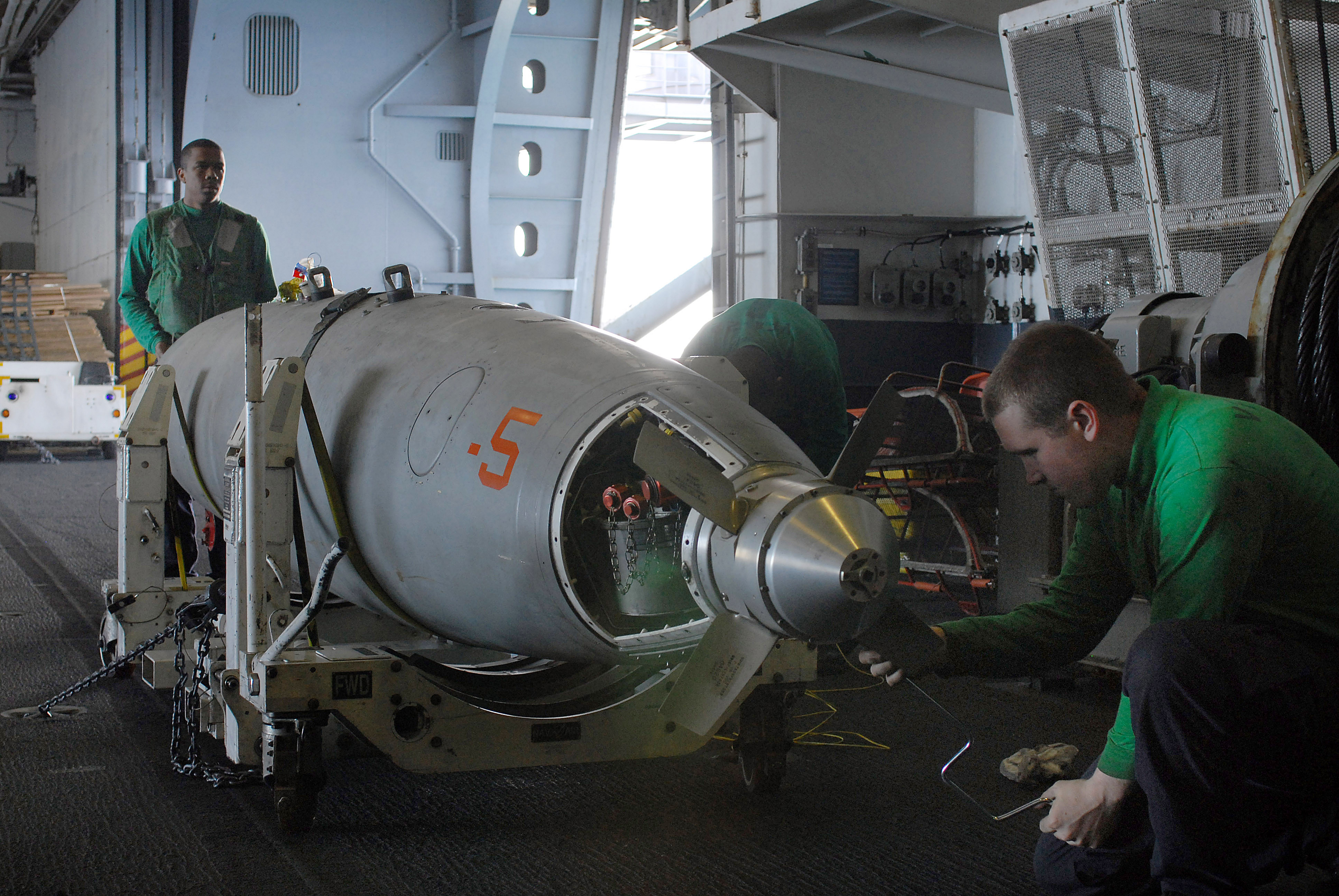
ADAN Jonathan Biles of VFA-22 helps reassemble an air refueling pod in the hangar bay of USS Ronald Reagan (CVN-76)

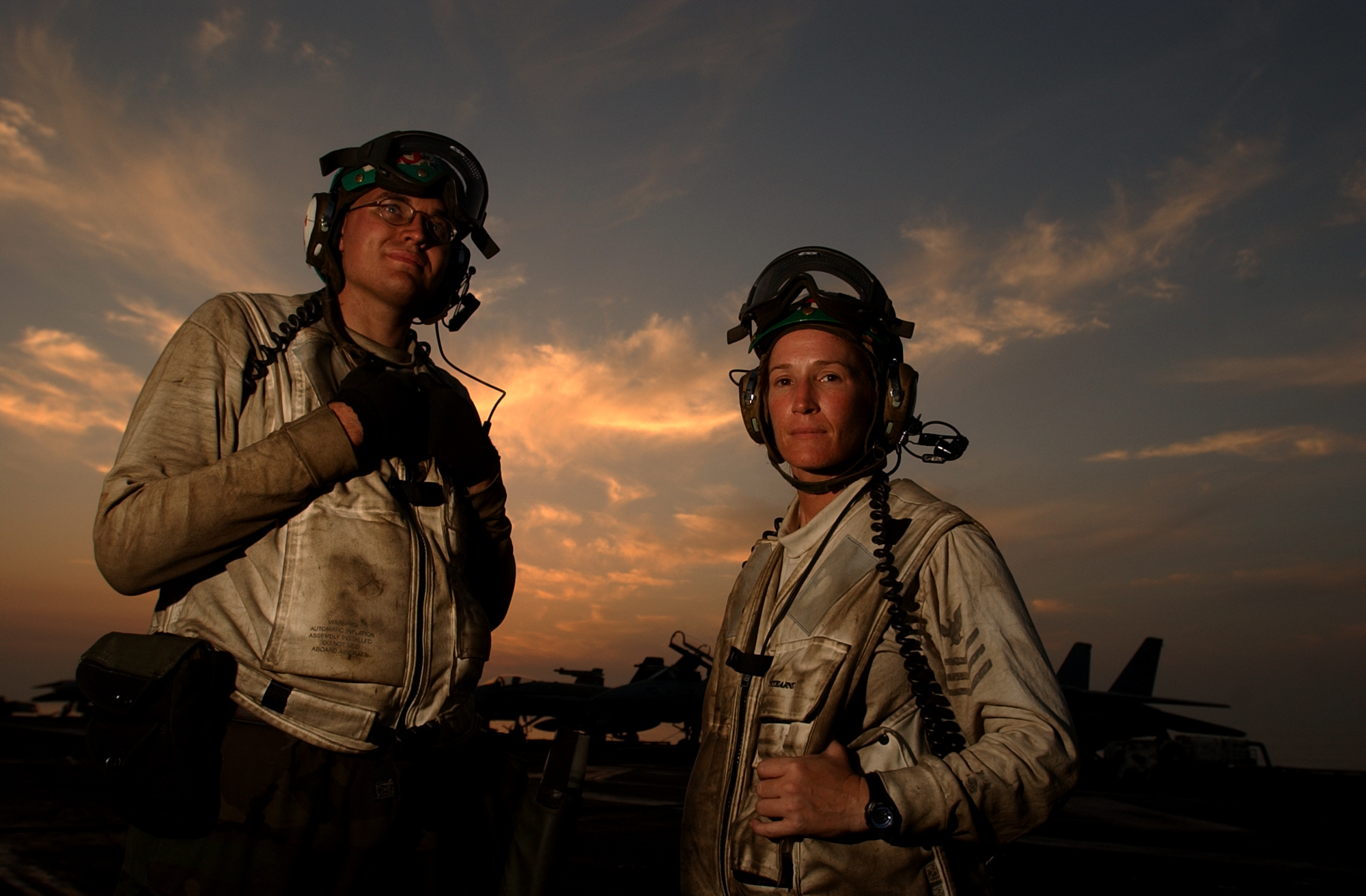
AD2 Corey Villasana and AD1 Julie Hollars of VFA-115 prepare for duty as flight deck troubleshooters during night operations on board USS Abraham Lincoln (CVN-72)

- General power plant maintenance
- Engine component inspection and maintenance
- Electro/Mechanical maintenance
- Engine linkage maintenance
- Auxiliary power
- Helicopter maintenance
- General maintenance
- Aviation support
- Corrosion control
- Hazardous material control and handling
- Maintenance administration
- Aircraft fuel systems maintenance
- Propeller systems

ADs may be assigned to sea or shore duty any place in the world, so their working environment varies considerably. They may work in hangars or hangar decks, outside on flight decks or flight lines at air stations. About 6,100 men and women work in this rating. Sailors in this rating are required to express themselves clearly in speech and writing, must have no speech impediment, and must pass hearing and color perception tests. ADs must have good memories and the ability to do repetitive tasks, perform detailed work, and keep accurate records.

Advanced technical and operational training is available in this U.S. Navy rating during later stages of an AD's career development.

== See also ==
- List of United States Navy ratings
- Aviation Maintenance Technician
