= Wilson Brown (admiral) =

United States Navy admiral (1882–1957)

Wilson Brown Jr.
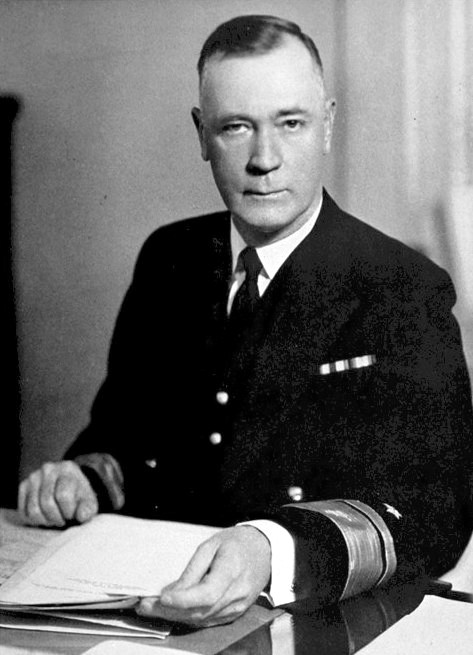
- Brown as a rear admiral
- Born: April 27, 1882; Philadelphia, Pennsylvania, U.S.
- Died: January 2, 1957 (aged 74); New Haven, Connecticut, U.S.
- Military career
- Allegiance: United States
- Branch: United States Navy
- Service years: 1902–1945
- Rank: Vice Admiral
- Commands: USS Parker; USS California; Task Force 11
- Conflicts: World War I World War II
- Awards: Navy Cross; Navy Distinguished Service Medal

Wilson Brown Jr. (27 April 1882 – 2 January 1957) was a vice admiral of the United States Navy who served in World War I and World War II. Brown turned 60 in April 1942, making him one of the oldest American naval officers to serve in combat during World War II.

== Biography ==
=== Early career ===
Brown, born in Philadelphia on 27 April 1882, graduated from the Naval Academy in 1902 standing 44th in a class of 59.

During World War I he served on the staff of Admiral William S. Sims in London, and commanded the destroyer Parker.

In 1921 he completed the Naval War College course and was promoted to the rank of commander; he then served as the executive officer of the battleship Colorado, before becoming aide to Presidents Calvin Coolidge and Herbert Hoover. In 1929 he was appointed Commander of the New London Submarine Base, and was promoted to captain in 1932, taking command of the battleship California.

In 1934 he became chief of staff of the Naval War College, and in 1936 he achieved flag rank as rear admiral, and was appointed commander of the Training Squadron Scouting Force (Atlantic Fleet). On 1 February 1938, he became Superintendent of the U.S. Naval Academy. On 1 February 1941, Brown assumed duty as Commander Scouting Force (Pacific Fleet) with the rank of vice admiral.

=== World War II ===
After the attack on Pearl Harbor Brown, though not an aviator, was placed in command of Task Force 11 based around the aircraft carrier Lexington. There was no requirement that a task force commander built around one or more aircraft carriers be aviators and many were not. Although Chief of Naval Operations Admiral Ernest King believed that Brown was "pretty good", his deteriorating health led King to have Pacific Fleet commander Chester W. Nimitz move him back to Pearl Harbor. Brown was appointed commander of the amphibious forces in the Pacific (ComPhibPac) on 10 April 1942, and command of TF 11 was given to Rear Admiral Aubrey W. Fitch.

However, his time at this post was short as on 15 July 1942, Brown was appointed commander (as a rear admiral) of the 1st Naval District.

== Further White House role ==
From 9 February 1943, Brown served as naval aide to President Franklin D. Roosevelt. Brown retired from the active list on 1 December 1944, with the rank of vice admiral, but remained as naval advisor to Roosevelt and his successor Harry S. Truman until the end of the war.

Brown wrote a book which described his experiences in serving four presidents as naval aide. The book was entitled Four Presidents as I Saw Them.

Brown died at the New Haven Naval Hospital, Connecticut, on 2 January 1957.

Eleanor Roosevelt wrote the following upon hearing of Brown's death:

"I was saddened to read in the paper of Vice Admiral Wilson Brown's death. He was with my husband for a long time and my husband was very fond of him.

He retired in 1945 and lived in Waterford, Conn., where I had the pleasure of visiting Mrs. Brown and the Admiral some years ago. He certainly had an active and interesting career and was highly valued by everyone with whom he served.

It must be a consolation when the evening of life draws near to look back on so many accomplishments, and I know Admiral Brown enjoyed his home in Waterford and was a valued member of that community.

To preserve the love of family and friends, and the respect and admiration of those with whom one has worked, is to end a life of service in this world with flags flying and a sense of a complete life."

== Awards ==
Brown received the Navy Cross for distinguished service as commanding officer of the USS Parker during World War I. He received the Navy Distinguished Service Medal for exceptionally meritorious service as a task force commander of the United States Pacific Fleet in February and March 1942.
