= USS Anderson =

Sims-class destroyer

Coordinates: 11°35′N 165°23′E

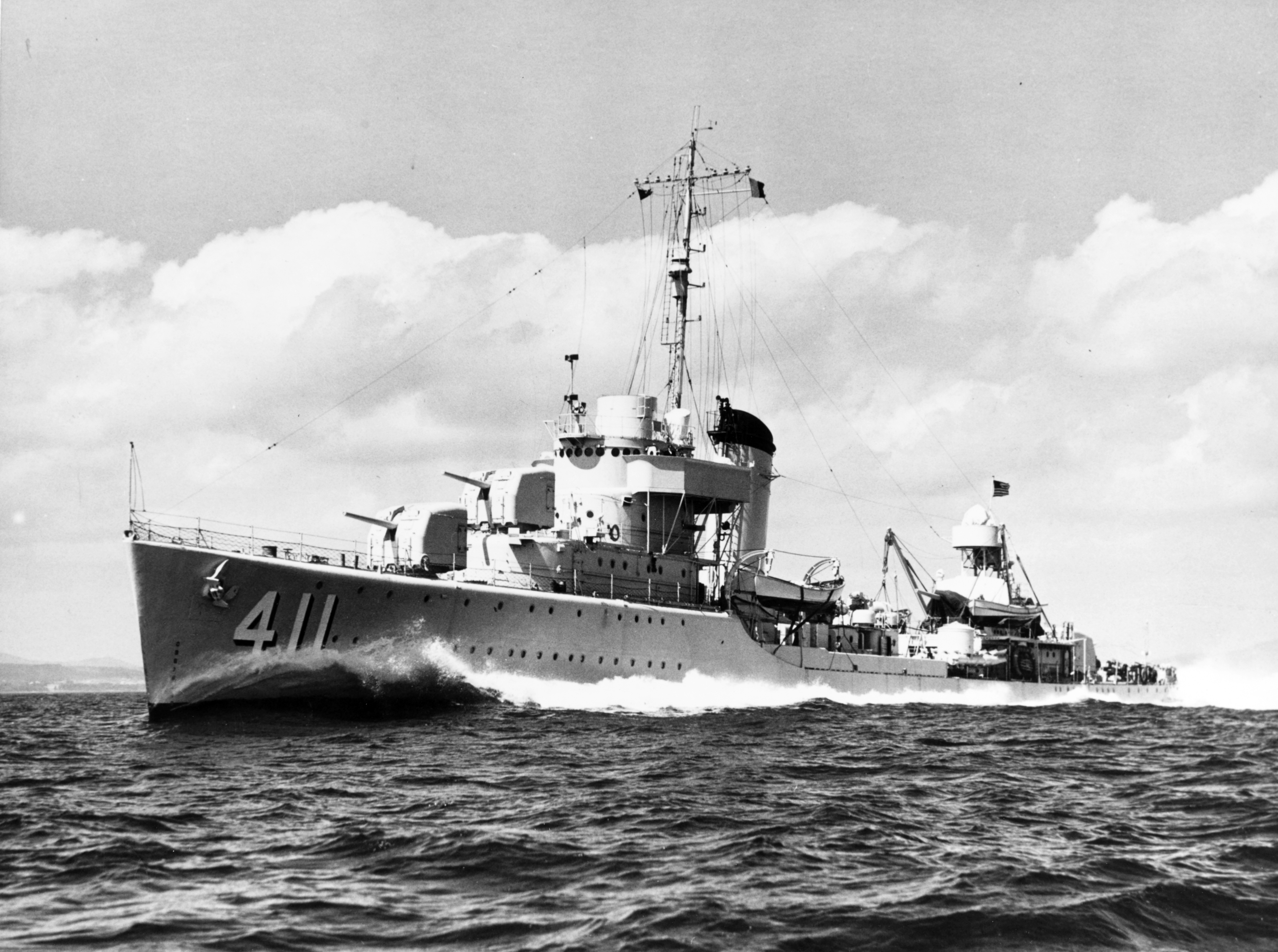
- Anderson running trials in 1939

History

United States
- Builder: Federal Shipbuilding and Drydock Company
- Laid down: 15 November 1937
- Launched: 4 February 1939
- Commissioned: 19 May 1939
- Decommissioned: 28 August 1946
- Stricken: 25 September 1946
- Honours and awards: 10 × battle stars; American Defense Service Medal ("Fleet" clasp, "A" device); Asiatic-Pacific Campaign Medal (2 stars); World War II Victory Medal; Navy Occupation Service Medal ("Japan" clasp)
- Fate: Sunk by Test "Able" (Operation Crossroads) at Bikini Atoll 1 July 1946

General characteristics
- Class & type: Sims-class destroyer
- Displacement: 1,570 long tons (1,600 t) (std); 2,211 long tons (2,246 t) (full)
- Length: 348 ft 3 1/4 in (106.2 m)
- Beam: 36 ft 1 in (11.0 m)
- Draught: 13 ft 4.5 in (4.1 m)
- Propulsion: High-pressure super-heated boilers; Geared turbines with twin screws; 50,000 hp (37,000 kW)
- Speed: 35 knots (65 km/h; 40 mph)
- Range: 3,660 nmi (6,780 km; 4,210 mi) at 20 kn (37 km/h; 23 mph)
- Complement: 192 (10 officers/182 enlisted)
- Armament: 5 × 5 inch/38, in single mounts; 4 × .50 caliber/90, in single mounts; 8 × 21 inch torpedo tubes in two quadruple mounts; 2 × depth charge track, 10 depth charges
- Armor: None

USS Anderson (DD-411) was a Sims-class destroyer in the United States Navy. She was named for Rear Admiral Edwin Alexander Anderson, Jr., a Medal of Honor recipient.

== Construction and commissioning ==
Anderson was laid down on 15 November 1937 at Kearny, New Jersey, by the Federal Shipbuilding and Drydock Company; launched on 4 February 1939; sponsored by Mrs. Mertie Loraine Anderson, the widow of Rear Admiral Anderson; towed to the New York Navy Yard, and delivered there to the Navy on 18 May 1939; and commissioned on 19 May 1939, Lieutenant Commander William M. Hobby, Jr., in command.

== Service history ==
=== Inter-War Period ===
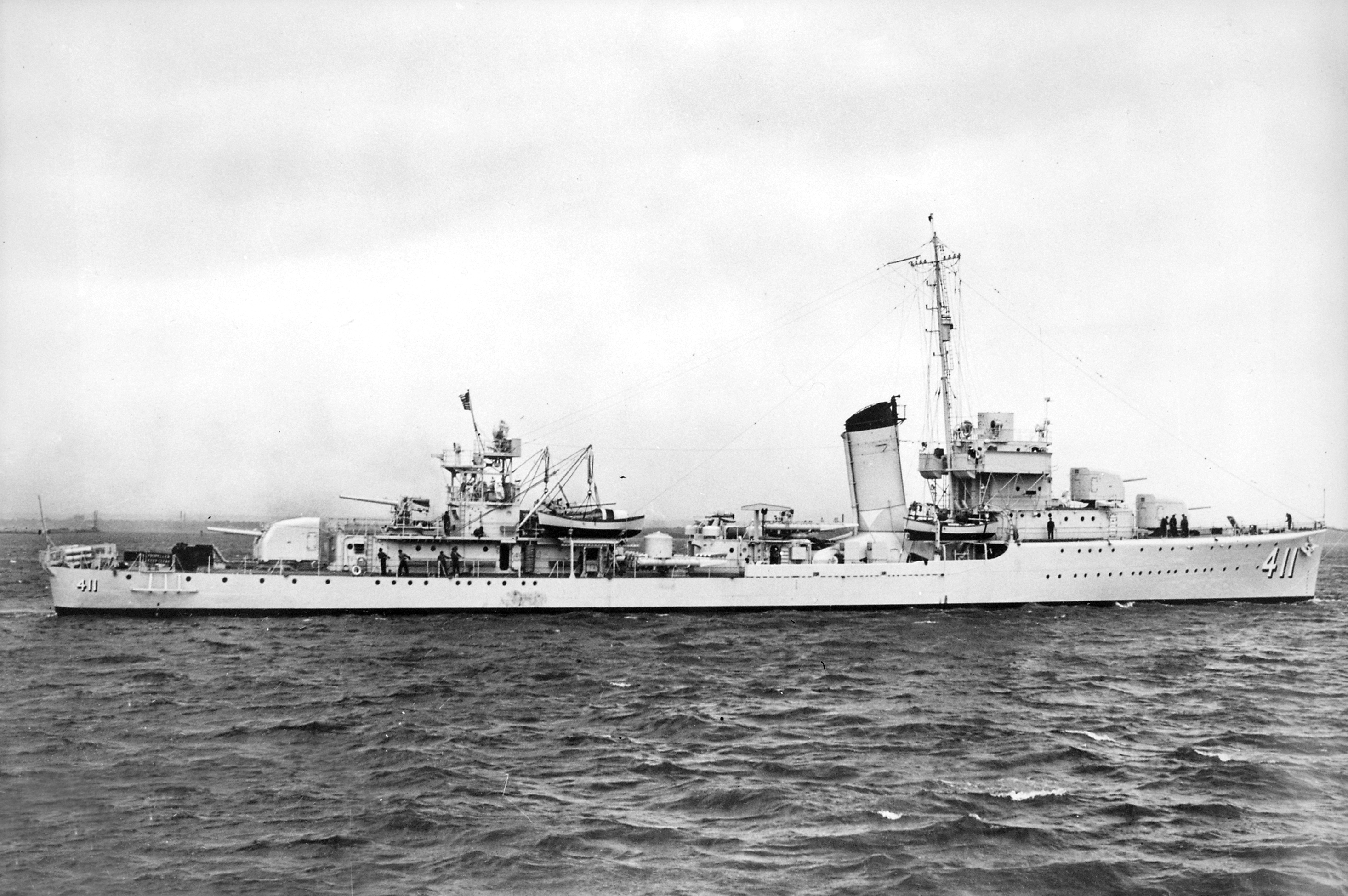
USS Anderson on 18 May 1939, just before commissioning.

Anderson was the first of the Sims class to be delivered in early 1939, and was found to be 150 tons overweight and dangerously top-heavy due to insufficient metacentric height. This touched off a redesign and rebuilding of the class, completed during 1941. One 5-inch gun (No. 3) and one quad torpedo tube mount were removed, with another torpedo tube mount relocated to the centerline. It was determined that an underestimate by the Bureau of Engineering of the weight of a new machinery design was responsible and that the Bureau of Construction and Repair did not have sufficient authority to detect or correct the error during the design process. This eventually led to the consolidation of the previous bureaus into the new Bureau of Ships on 20 June 1940.

After commissioning, Anderson remained at the New York Navy Yard through June, fitting out, during which time she contributed a landing party of sailors to march in the New York City Flag Day parade on 14 June 1939. Underway from her berth on 5 July, Anderson reached Newport, Rhode Island, on 7 July, mooring to the east dock at the Naval Torpedo Station, and taking on board torpedo warheads, exploders, and test equipment before returning to the New York Navy Yard the next day, pausing there only briefly before getting underway later that afternoon for Washington, D.C.

Anchoring off Quantico on the night of 9 July, Anderson steamed up the Potomac River, rendering the prescribed passing honors abeam of Mount Vernon, and arrived at the Washington Navy Yard at 0721 on 10 July. The next day, a number of high-ranking officers informally inspected the new destroyer, the first of the Sims-class to be placed in commission, Admiral Harold R. Stark, the Chief of Naval Operations, accompanied by Captain H. T. Markland; Rear Admirals Robert L. Ghormley, Director of War Plans, and William R. Furlong, Chief of the Bureau of Ordnance, as well as Charles Edison, the Acting Secretary of the Navy.

On 12 July, assisted by Tecumseh and Undaunted, Anderson got underway for Yorktown, Virginia. She loaded depth charges at the mine depot at Yorktown before moving to the Naval Operating Base (NOB) at Norfolk before getting underway on 14 July for Wilmington, North Carolina. Wilmington was the hometown of the man for whom the ship had been named, Admiral Anderson; and it accorded the ship a warm welcome. The local paper editorialized: "It is a pleasure to have you in port and to inspect the magnificent new destroyer named in honor of a distinguished son. The ship and its personnel are a credit to the record and memory of the man for whom your ship is named... Therefore, we bid you welcome, and if there is aught that can add to your entertainment while here, you have but to ask any resident and it is yours..." Anderson gave a tea for Mrs. Anderson, members of the late flag officer's family, and the city officials of Wilmington on the afternoon of 17 July. On the next day, assisted out into the stream by the tug Battler, the destroyer made a departure from Wilmington.

Reaching NOB, Norfolk, on 19 July, Anderson shifted to the Norfolk Navy Yard that same day to take onboard ammunition. After embarking six enlisted Marines for transportation to the Marine Barracks at Guantanamo Bay, Anderson got underway on 21 July for Cuban waters and the initial part of her shakedown cruise. Arriving at Guantanamo on 24 July, the destroyer disembarked her passengers before operating locally over the next few days.

Anderson then visited San Juan, Puerto Rico (from 1–5 August); Coco Solo, Panama Canal Zone (8–14 August); and Hamilton, Bermuda (19–21 August); St. John's, Newfoundland and Labrador (25–28 August); before she reached Montreal, Quebec, Canada, on the morning of 31 August. Underway on 5 September, the destroyer called briefly at Quebec (5 to 6 September) before she headed for Newport. On 8 September, while en route, Anderson sighted a merchantman eight miles (13 km) distant, identifying her as Norwegian by the display of national colors on ship's side. Soon thereafter, a plane, identified as "British" (possibly Royal Canadian Air Force) by the wing markings, circled Anderson at low altitude, obviously scrutinizing the ship thoroughly before banking away and heading for the coast.

Anderson made arrival at the Naval Torpedo Station at Newport the following day, 9 September, and over the next few days served as the underway "target" for torpedo practice conducted by Jouett on the testing range in Narragansett Bay. On 16 September, Anderson arrived back at the New York Navy Yard, her shakedown completed, for the installation of her main battery director. After brief periods underway for testing fire control equipment (21–22 September), Anderson took a departure from New York for NOB, Norfolk, arriving on 24 September.

Anderson conducted gunnery exercises on the Southern Drill Grounds off the Virginia Capes, firing at a target towed by Acushnet on 26 September before firing antiaircraft battery practice on 28 September. She arrived at the New York Navy Yard for post-shakedown availability on the morning of 1 October; these repairs and alterations continuing through the end of January 1940.

The destroyer then touched briefly at the Boston Navy Yard before she ran her final acceptance trials off Rockland, Maine, on 7 February 1940, with Rear Admiral H. L. Brinser, president of the Board of Inspection and Survey, embarked. Anderson then paid a return visit to the Boston Navy Yard on 9 February before returning to New York, via the Cape Cod Canal, Buzzards Bay and Oyster Bay, on 12 February.

Anderson remained at the Navy Yard through the end of March, after which time she sailed for Newport, for torpedo firing tests on 10 April. At 1130 on 12 April, the destroyer embarked the Honorable John Z. Anderson, a California Congressman and member of the House Naval Affairs Committee, and got underway shortly thereafter, reaching NOB, Norfolk, and mooring to Pier 7, at 2008 the following day, disembarking her passenger the next morning.

Underway in company with Manley, Anderson stood out, headed for Guantanamo Bay, on the afternoon of 15 April. The next day, 14 hours out of Norfolk, the ships ran into heavy weather. At 0440 on 16 April, the strongback of the port lifeboat was reported to be cracked. Lieutenant George R. Phelan, the executive officer, gathered men of the deck force in the lee of the galley, amidships, as the ship steered various courses in an attempt to lessen the roll and thereby facilitate efforts to secure the port lifeboat. Between rolls, Lieutenant Phelan and his men attempted to recover the boat and make it fast, but the effort soon became too dangerous, not worth the lives of the men, and the work had to be abandoned, the boat carrying away completely at 0718. Ultimately, Anderson reached Guantanamo Bay at 0618 on 19 April.

Underway again nine hours later, Anderson, again in company with Manley, reached the submarine base at Coco Solo, Panama Canal Zone, on 21 April. Transiting the Panama Canal on 23 April, Anderson proceeded independently up the west coast of Central America, reaching Acapulco, Mexico, on the 27th. The next morning, following by nine hours the visit of Commander W. M. Dillon, the naval attaché at the United States Embassy in Mexico City, Anderson sent ashore a working party to bring off "naval stores salvaged from the wreck" of Timber Rush (listed in the 1941 Merchant Vessel Register as "abandoned" during the previous year). Underway again four hours later, Anderson rejoined Manley on 30 April, and reached San Diego at 0900 on 1 May 1940.

After conducting a brief harbor cruise with 85 Army reservists embarked on 18 May, Anderson got underway to conduct a neutrality patrol off the coast of southern California. During the course of this operation on 20 May, the destroyer sighted a tug five miles (8.0 km) away at 0945 and altered course to close and investigate. Closer examination revealed Ray P. Clark, towing a barge laden with horses and bales of hay and flying a distress signal. Anderson immediately called away her fire and rescue party and stopped to render assistance, help which turned out to be only giving directions to the tug which had become lost and needed the course to San Nicolas Island. The assistance duly rendered, Anderson continued on her appointed rounds, arriving back at San Diego on the morning of 23 May.

The warship commenced the month of June as plane guard for Yorktown, as that carrier conducted local operations out of North Island; she later planeguarded for Enterprise from 19 to 21 June, interspersed with type training and gunnery practices out of Pyramid Cove, San Clemente Island. At 0900 on 22 June, as the ship prepared to sail for Hawaiian waters, Commander Allan E. Smith reported on board and broke his pennant in Anderson as Commander, Destroyer Division 3 (DesDiv 3); Anderson subsequently took a departure from San Diego on the morning of 25 June, sailing in company with Enterprise and Hammann, Mustin, Sterett, Hopkins and Rowan.

During the passage to Hawaii, Anderson alternated with the other destroyers in standing plane guard duty for Enterprise and then serving as an antisubmarine screen. On 28 June, during morning flight operations, a plane from Scouting Squadron (VS) 6 lost power after being catapulted from the flight deck and was forced to ditch. Hammann arrived on the scene first and rescued the pilot and his radioman, Enterprise later drew alongside the plane and recovered it. Subsequently, Anderson covered the arrival of the force at Pearl Harbor and then followed it in, mooring on the morning of 2 July.

For the next five months, Anderson operated locally put of Pearl Harbor and Lahaina Roads. Her operations within the Hawaiian chain took her to Palmyra (22 July) and Christmas Island (23 July); and included such evolutions as antiaircraft and machine gun practices; battle depth charge practices, and torpedo practices, often operating in company with destroyers, light cruisers, and battleships. Interspersed were periods of upkeep back at Pearl Harbor alongside Altair between 26 and 28 October, and drydocking (28 to 29 October and again from 30 October to 4 November). The ship also patrolled assigned areas adjacent to the Lahaina Roads anchorage, off Maui, and off Honolulu and Pearl Harbor, intercepting and identifying many merchantmen, and local craft, such as fishing boats, as well as noting the movements of American warships. Following this intensive period of operations in Hawaiian waters, Anderson took a departure from Pearl Harbor on 2 December 1940, bound for the West Coast in company with the rest of Destroyer Squadron (DesRon) 8.

Arriving at San Diego on the afternoon of 8 December, Anderson steamed to the Los Angeles Shipbuilding and Drydock Company, San Pedro, Los Angeles, the day after Christmas, and underwent an overhaul there through the first week of January 1941. Then, after operating locally out of Long Beach and San Diego, Anderson took a departure from San Diego on the morning of 14 January and rendezvoused with Enterprise and Lexington off San Pedro. The force conducted drills and exercises en route to the Hawaiian Islands, reaching Pearl Harbor on the morning of 21 January.

Anderson resumed operations in the Hawaiian area on 12 February, conducting such evolutions as depth charge practices, night battle practice runs, and gunnery drills, until returning to Pearl Harbor on 19 February. Underway again two days later she conducted more gunnery runs and damage control problems before returning to port that afternoon to provision from the storeship Arctic. Underway again on the morning of 22 February, Anderson patrolled off the entrance to Pearl Harbor and encountered a fishing craft trespassing in a security zone; lowering her motor whaleboat, Anderson investigated the craft and warned her owner to keep away from those waters. Anderson returned to Pearl Harbor the next morning, 23 February, before resuming the intensive schedule of operations with the other ships in her division that lasted through the end of February.

During March 1941, Anderson continued the rapid pace of operations out of Pearl Harbor, operating with the fleet and honing her skills in antisubmarine warfare tactics and in gunnery. She also operated for a time with Yorktown as plane guard. During flight operations on the morning of 17 March 1941, two TBD Devastators from Torpedo Squadron 5 collided at 1,000 feet (300 metres) and crashed into the sea, 2,500 yards (2.3 km) from the carrier. Yorktown's boats recovered the bodies of the pilots, but both planes sank in 2,910 fathoms (5,320 m) of water, carrying the other four men – two in each aircraft – with them. Anderson – detailed to remain in the vicinity and continue the search – found only small parts of the planes and pieces of clothing.

These evolutions in Hawaiian waters proved to be the last for some time; Anderson got underway for the West Coast of the United States shortly after noon on 24 March, and reached Mare Island Navy Yard on the last day of the month after first disembarking, at San Francisco, enlisted passengers transported from Pearl Harbor. The destroyer spent all of April 1941 undergoing repairs and alterations at the West Coast yard, and on 16 May got underway for her post-repair trials.

After operating briefly in San Francisco Bay, Anderson shifted to Long Beach on 21 May, and eight days later, took a departure, ostensibly, for the Hawaiian Islands, in company with her division mates, Hammann, Mustin, and Rowan. The ships soon received a change of orders. They rendezvoused with Philadelphia on the afternoon of 30 May, and soon proceeded down the coast, bound for Panama, as another increment of the Pacific Fleet was withdrawn to augment the Atlantic Fleet in its undeclared war with the German Navy in the Atlantic.

=== Atlantic Neutrality Patrols ===
Transiting the Panama Canal on the night of 8–9 June, Anderson, her hull number and name painted out for security reasons, passed the Cristobal breakwater at 0125 on 9 June, en route to Guantanamo Bay. Fueling there on 11 June, Anderson got underway the same afternoon, quickly taking up antisubmarine screening station off the port bow of Idaho, which she escorted up the eastern seaboard to the Philadelphia Navy Yard, arriving there on 15 June.

The respite in port proved brief, however, since Anderson took a departure early on the morning of 19 June. Joined by Rowan shortly thereafter, the destroyer stood down the Delaware River, and out into the Atlantic. They joined Tuscaloosa the following morning, and, later, Wasp shortly after noon on 21 June.

Together, these ships proceeded out into the central Atlantic on neutrality patrol, cruising almost as far as the Cape Verde Islands, "safeguarding the neutrality of the United States." Their voyage took them almost to the edge of the zones defined in operations orders of April and June 1941. Anderson served as plane guard for Wasp and as an antisubmarine screen for the carrier and for Tuscaloosa during the patrol that ultimately came to an end at Bermuda on Independence Day, 1941.

After a brief period in Bermudan waters, a break she utilized for a short stint of close-range battle practice, Anderson took a departure on 12 July for Norfolk, reaching her destination the following day. After getting underway from the Tidewater region for torpedo practice on 17 July, the warship sailed north for Boston, and reached the Boston Navy Yard on the afternoon of 19 July.

Anderson then underwent repairs and alterations into early August; during her time in the yard, her number three 5 inch (127 mm) mount was removed to save topside weight and allow the fitting of additional .50 caliber (12.7 mm) machine guns, extensions to her depth charge tracks, and a "Y"-gun (depth charge projector), in addition to two dozen additional depth charges. Thus refitted to better perform the escort role needed in the developing Battle of the Atlantic, she participated in intensive antisubmarine exercises out of Provincetown, Massachusetts, during the latter half of August 1941 before returning to Boston on the 30th. Anderson's operations now carried her farther north, as she sailed for Casco Bay, Maine, on 2 September, exercising with Tuscaloosa en route.

Assigned to Task Force 15 (TF 15), Anderson steamed as part of the escort force for the first major reinforcement convoy bound for Iceland, carrying an Army brigade to augment the Marines who had been there since July. The ships reached Reykjavík on the evening of 15 September after a passage enlivened by two "submarine" contacts in Anderson's vicinity: one summarily depth-charged by Walke on 8 September, the other by Hilary P. Jones on the 10th. Then, between 26 September and 3 October, Anderson escorted a convoy to Placentia Bay, Newfoundland.

Anderson remained at Placentia Bay for almost a week before getting underway on 10 October as part of the antisubmarine screen for TF 14, formed around Yorktown. This force reached Casco Bay, Maine, on the afternoon of 13 October. Moving down to Provincetown, Anderson again conducted antisubmarine exercises, and as in previous practices, the ship's performance was "outstanding in detecting the presence of a submarine and carrying out a successful attack." Later, after a tender availability alongside Denebola at Casco Bay, she resumed her operations at sea with TF 14.

Standing out of Casco Bay on the afternoon of 26 October, with Task Group 14.3 (TG 14.3), Savannah, Philadelphia, New Mexico, Yorktown, and seven destroyers as the escort for a convoy of six British cargo ships bound for the British Isles, Anderson, in the inner anti-submarine screen, plane guarded for the carrier as she conducted flight operations covering the convoy as it moved out into the Atlantic.

On 30 October, 700 mi (1,100 km) from St. John's, Newfoundland, Yorktown had just completed recovering planes and was proceeding to refuel Sims when, at 1219, Anderson made an underwater contact, 1,300 yards (1,200 m) distant. Anderson went to general quarters immediately and proceeded ahead to develop the contact dropping a standard pattern of six depth charges at 1225. Five minutes later, Morris dropped an "embarrassing barrage". Other ships in the vicinity, however, began sighting porpoises and blackfish, leading Commander Frank G. Fahrion, Commander, DesDiv 3 in Anderson, to report over the high-frequency radio (TBS) to Morris that, in view of the fish sightings, the contact was a false one.

Soon thereafter, however, Anderson's men saw an oil slick and lowered a bucket that, when drawn up, contained a mixture of oil, water, and burnt TNT. At 1305, the destroyer picked up a propeller noise and attacked with a second pattern of six depth charges. Soon thereafter, Hughes, also in on the "hunt", picked up a contact and requested Anderson to develop it. The latter dropped another pattern in 1409.

Anderson secured from general quarters at 1421, and then, in company with Hughes, tried to develop further contacts or to obtain concrete evidence of a "kill." Unfortunately, it appeared that their quarry had escaped.

After securing from the search at 1503, Anderson remained with TF 14 until detached on 6 November. At 1637 on that same day, while steaming in company with Hammann, Anderson sighted an unidentified ship which instituted radical course changes when she apparently sighted the two American destroyers. As Hammann parted company, Anderson investigated the stranger, finding her to be Trondheim, steaming singly from Belfast, Northern Ireland, to Halifax, Nova Scotia. The destroyer then trailed the tanker for a time until securing from the effort at 2246.

Reaching Hvalfjörður on 7 November and fueling from Sapelo upon arrival, Anderson then spent the next month operating in Icelandic waters, out of Hvalfjörður ("Valley Forge") and Reykjavík ("Rinky Dink"). The ship's last "peacetime" operations consisted of a sweep, in company with Idaho and Mississippi from Reykjavík across the southern end of the Denmark Strait, between Iceland and Greenland, between 1 and 6 December 1941.

=== World War II ===
==== Atlantic ====
Underway from Hvalfjörður, Iceland, on the morning of 9 December 1941, two days after the Japanese attack upon the Pacific Fleet at Pearl Harbor, halfway across the globe, Anderson reached the Norfolk Navy Yard on 17 December, tarrying only a short time before taking a departure at 0537 on 18 December for Charleston, South Carolina in company with Hammann, Mustin, and Morris, and reaching their destination the following morning. Unloading ammunition the following day, Anderson spent the rest of 1941 undergoing repairs and alterations at the Charleston Navy Yard, including the replacement of her .50-caliber (12.7 mm) machine guns with 20 mm antiaircraft guns.

Three days into 1942, Anderson sailed for Norfolk, Virginia and after calibrating her degaussing gear on the Wolf Trap degaussing range, near Norfolk, the destroyer arrived at NOB, Norfolk, on the morning of 5 January. mi Once again, the respite in port proved brief, and at midday on 6 January, Anderson cleared Hampton Roads in company with Morris and Hammann, ultimately taking a screening position on the port beam of Mississippi in the force escorting the battlewagons of BatDiv 3 back to the Pacific Ocean.

==== Pacific ====
Over the next four days, the destroyers guarded New Mexico, Mississippi, and President Hayes as they headed down the East Coast of the United States and across the Gulf of Mexico. Reaching Cristobal on the morning of 11 January, Anderson transited the Panama Canal during the day, mooring at Balboa that afternoon. After taking on fuel, the destroyer was underway once more, that evening, bound for San Diego, California. On the second leg of the voyage, all ships remained alert. Within two days of a departure from Panama, Anderson's lookouts reported a torpedo track at 0113 on 13 January. Over the next four days, the ships sighted, challenged and identified two ships, both of which proved to be friendly: the British-registry Ocean Voice and the American-registry Kishacoquillas, on 15 and 17 January, respectively.

During the passage, the ships honed up their gunnery skills, and OS2U Kingfishers simulated dive, torpedo, and high-level bombing attacks on the convoy. Off San Francisco Bay, the submarine jitters struck again, this time as Hammann reported a contact on the morning of 22 January and depth charged the "contact" with negative results. The odyssey from the East Coast completed, Anderson moored in a nest at Pier 54, San Francisco, at 1250 on 22 January 1942.

Anderson subsequently unmoored on the morning of 25 January, after having undergone a brief tender availability in a nest alongside Dixie and stood out of San Francisco Bay, bound for a rendezvous with Convoy 2019.

Hampered by the typical foggy conditions surrounding the bay area, assembly took some time, but ultimately, with all units present and accounted for, the convoy set out for the Hawaiian Islands. Anderson covered the entry of the ships into the Pearl Harbor channel shortly before noon on 2 February.

Anderson spent the next two weeks either at or operating locally from Pearl Harbor. Her underway periods included a turn at the Pearl Harbor entrance patrol (11–12 February) and duty screening Louisville as that ship conducted gunnery exercises on 14 February.

Underway at 0817 on 16 February, Anderson stood out to sea, joining up with Task Force 17 (TF17), consisting of Yorktown, Astoria, Louisville, Hammann, Sims, and Walke, under Rear Admiral Frank Jack Fletcher, later that afternoon. The next two weeks found the Yorktown task force working its way toward the southwest Pacific. On 6 March 1942, TF 17 rendezvoused with TF 11 under Vice Admiral Wilson Brown, to raid the Japanese stronghold of Rabaul.

While Brown's and Fletcher's ships were en route to that area, however, Australian reconnaissance planes detected a Japanese invasion force moving toward the settlements of Lae and Salamaua, on the eastern coast of New Guinea. Both fell with little resistance, but the incipient enemy base, and the airfields at both places, presented the Allies with a fine new target, and a chance to get back at the enemy at his most vulnerable time – before he had consolidated his beachhead. The raid on Rabaul was shelved.

To provide security for the carriers' operations in the Gulf of Papua, Brown detached a surface force to remain in the waters of the Louisiade Archipelago, near Rossel Island, to intercept any enemy thrust toward Port Moresby and cover the arrival of Army troops scheduled to arrive at about that time at Nouméa, New Caledonia. He placed this force, Astoria, Chicago, Louisville, Australia, Anderson, Sims, Hammann, and Hughes, under Rear Admiral John G. Crace, Royal Australian Navy. While the patrol proved uneventful for Grace's ships, which rejoined TF 11 on 14 March, the Lae-Salamaua raid carried out by planes from Yorktown and Lexington forced the Japanese to husband carefully their amphibious resources, already on the proverbial "shoestring", for their planned operations in the Solomon Islands.

Anderson, operated with Yorktown through late April, patrolling the Coral Sea as the sole barrier against Japanese expansion in that region, putting into Tongatapu, in the Tonga (or "Friendly") Islands, late that month. With intelligence data indicating that the postponed movement against Tulagi, in the Solomons, was imminent—confirmed by the Japanese landing men and supplies there on 29 April and establishing a seaplane base on the heels of the retreating Australian garrison, TF 17 moved north to deal with this threat.

==== Battle of the Coral Sea ====
On 4 May, Anderson, her men "anxious to get a chance to attack" the enemy, screened Yorktown as she launched three attacks on the incipient base at Tulagi, the carrier's planes sinking a destroyer and some small auxiliaries, at the relatively modest cost of only three aircraft (whose crews were later recovered).

Reinforced on 6 May by Rear Admiral Aubrey W. Fitch's TF 11, Fletcher planned to meet the Japanese in the Coral Sea on 7 May, to stop the enemy thrust toward Port Moresby. On that day, each side attempted to strike blows with carrier aircraft; the Americans enjoying more success in that planes from Yorktown and Lexington sank Shōhō. Japanese planes, attempting to strike the Americans, could not find them in the gathering darkness, and a twilight encounter between the returning Japanese air groups and American fighters robbed the enemy of experienced crews as well as virtually irreplaceable aircraft. Anderson, assigned to the Air Group (TG 17.5), operated in the screen of Lexington.

The Japanese Striking Force, however, formed around Shōkaku and Zuikaku was, on 7 May, well south of Guadalcanal. The same day that American planes had dispatched Shōhō, planes from the enemy carriers sank Sims and damaged Neosho so severely that she had to be sunk later.

The next morning some 170 mi (270 km) separated the two forces. The Americans struck first, crippling Shōkaku; anti-aircraft fire and combat air patrol aircraft soon decimated Zuikaku's air group. Meanwhile, the American carriers had taken divergent courses as the incoming Japanese strike neared them, Yorktown, Lexington, and their respective screens drawing three or four miles apart; Anderson continued to screen Lexington. About 1116 on 8 May, the first of the Japanese planes came in on the attack, which lasted until 1200. During the attack, Anderson maintained station on Lexington, constantly firing at the enemy, but scoring no hits. With the exception of one burst of machine gun fire, the destroyer was not attacked, the enemy concentrating his attack on Lexington.

"Lady Lex" took two hits on the port side. Then, Aichi D3A "Val" dive bombers punctured her with near misses and staggered her with two direct hits. A bomb smashed into the port forward gun gallery, and another exploded inside the carrier's funnel. During the afternoon her fires were brought under control and her list corrected. But the explosions had ruptured her gasoline pipes, and about 1445 a series of explosions occurred, setting off internal fires. Anderson stood by to render assistance and pick up survivors as the big carrier was abandoned, and rescued 377 men. Eventually, Phelps had to sink Lexington with torpedoes.

The first battle fought with neither side sighting the other except from the cockpits of their respective aircraft, the engagement in the Coral Sea stopped the Japanese thrust toward Port Moresby. It was a strategic victory for the Allies, but a tactical one for the enemy, since the Japanese had inflicted heavier damage on the American carriers. Besides the loss of Lexington, Yorktown had been badly damaged.

On 10 May, Anderson transferred the 377 Lexington sailors to Portland, and, the following day, put into Nouméa, New Caledonia, where she transferred five torpedoes to Phelps, which had expended torpedoes in attempting to sink Lexington. She sailed thence to Tongatapu, where she rejoined TF 17. On 28 May, she reached Pearl Harbor. Her rest, however, was to prove short, for forces were needed to thwart a new Japanese thrust, this one directed at Midway Island to draw out the United States fleet in a decisive battle. Anderson sortied again with TF 17 on 30 May, again in the screen for Yorktown, which had been hastily repaired.

===== Battle of Midway =====
On 4 June, Japanese planes struck the island of Midway with little opposition, and returned to their carriers to re-arm for a second strike. Confusion on the Japanese side as to what forces they found themselves facing proved fatal, as the American air attack from Yorktown, Enterprise, and Hornet caught the enemy at a vulnerable moment. While torpedo planes from the three carriers successively drew off the combat air patrols, dive bombers from Yorktown and Enterprise wrought mortal damage on three of the four enemy carriers engaged.

Planes from Hiryū, the one enemy aircraft carrier that had escaped destruction that morning, soon sought out the Americans and located TF 17. Although decimated by TF 17's combat air patrol, "Val" dive bombers managed to score damaging hits on Yorktown, causing her to go dead in the water. Anderson's gunners claimed two Japanese planes downed as they retired from the scene. Yorktown, however, was underway again two hours later, her fires put out and power restored, and commencing to launch fighters when a second attack wave, this time composed of Nakajima B5N "Kate" torpedo planes, showed up. In the developing melee, Anderson shot down one "Kate" before it had a chance to launch its torpedo, but others managed to penetrate the terrific barrage and drop their ordnance, scoring two hits on the carrier's port side amidships.

Anderson's gunners claimed one of the retiring planes with a direct hit. As Yorktown, mortally wounded, slowed to a halt for the second time that day, Anderson picked up Ensign Milton Tootle, IV, USNR, a pilot from Fighting Squadron 3 (VF-3) who had been shot down attacking a Japanese torpedo plane. The destroyer then closed Yorktown and picked up 203 more men.

While TF 17 gathered Yorktown's men and then cleared the area, the ship remained stubbornly afloat. When it became evident that the carrier would not sink immediately and might be saved, Admiral Fletcher ordered a salvage party put on board. Under tow by Vireo and with a salvage party on board composed of volunteers from the various ship departments, Yorktown appeared to be on the threshold of salvage. The arrival of Japanese submarine I-168 (2), however, changed all that, and the gallant carrier was torpedoed on 6 June, along with Hammann. The latter sank immediately; Yorktown lingered until the following morning when she, too, sank.

Anderson returned to Pearl Harbor on 13 June. From 8–15 July she escorted Fulton to Midway, and from 22 to 27 July, she escorted Long Island to Palmyra Island and back to Pearl Harbor.

===== Guadalcanal =====
On 17 August, Anderson sortied from Pearl Harbor with TF 17, en route to the Solomons area, where she sighted and joined TF 61 on 29 August. Anderson was assigned as screen for Hornet in TG 61.2. The Battle of the Eastern Solomons, which had taken place on 24 August, had turned back a major Japanese attempt to recapture Guadalcanal. Enemy submarines, however, still lurked in the waters east of Guadalcanal. On 31 August, Saratoga, in TG 61.1, was torpedoed and damaged, and forced to retire to Tongatapu. On 14 September, six transports carrying reinforcements and supplies for Guadalcanal departed Espiritu Santo, with the task groups formed around Wasp and Hornet in support.

Enemy submarines, however, again made their deadly presence felt. On 15 September, the Japanese submarine I-19 torpedoed Wasp. At that time, Anderson was screening Hornet, about six miles (9.7 km) northeast of Wasp. A few minutes later, torpedoes were spotted racing toward Hornet, which maneuvered to avoid them. They passed ahead, one smashing into North Carolina and the other into O'Brien. Anderson was ordered to stand by the damaged battleship, and escorted her to Tongatapu on 19 September.

During the remainder of September 1942, Anderson escorted a Dutch convoy to Dumbea Bay, New Caledonia, then on 3 October sortied with TF 17 en route to launch an air attack against enemy vessels in the Buin-Faisi area. On 3 October, Anderson was detached to proceed to the rescue of a downed pilot. The pilot was not found, and since the task force was by that time too far away to enable her to rejoin before the mission was accomplished, she proceeded singly to Nouméa.

===== Battle of the Santa Cruz Islands =====
She rejoined TF 17 on 8 October, and on 15 October, received orders to proceed north to the Guadalcanal area to strike enemy forces in order to relieve pressure there. Hornet launched strikes on 16 October, and on 24 October the force joined with TF 16 to form TF 61. On 26 October, the American ships engaged a numerically superior Japanese striking force in the Battle of the Santa Cruz Islands. Contact between the two opposing forces, as at Coral Sea, was almost simultaneous. During the day planes from Enterprise and Hornet damaged two enemy carriers, a cruiser, and two destroyers. American ship casualties, however, were considerably heavier.

At 1010 on that morning some 27 planes attacked Hornet. Anderson opened fire, scoring hits on two planes, and splashing one. One bomb hit Hornet's flight deck, then a "Val" crashed the ship. A moment later two "Kates" swept in, launching torpedoes which hit the carrier's engineering spaces. As she slowed to a halt, she was hit by three more bombs and another "Val". During this melee, Anderson succeeded in downing another torpedo plane, scored hits on several others, and took one machine gun bullet hit causing a small crack and dent in her side plating amidships.

At noon, Northampton attempted to take Hornet in tow, but at 1815, another flock of enemy dive-bombers and torpedo planes roared in to attack the crippled carrier. A veritable sitting duck, she took a torpedo and a bomb hit, and abandoned ship. Anderson moved in to pick up survivors, taking on board 247 men. Mustin was ordered to sink the hulk, and scored three torpedo hits, but Hornet remained stubbornly afloat. Anderson was ordered to finish the job and slammed six torpedoes into the target, but she still remained afloat. Anderson and Mustin shelled Hornet, but the arrival of Japanese destroyers on the horizon forced the two American destroyers to take a hurried a departure. On the morning of 27 October, Japanese destroyers performed the final rites for Hornet with four torpedoes.

During the Japanese attack on Hornet, the Enterprise group over the horizon had not gone unscathed. Porter was sunk inadvertently by torpedo from a Japanese submarine while rescuing a downed pilot; Enterprise suffered three bomb hits; Smith was severely damaged by a suicider; and both South Dakota and San Juan suffered minor damage from bomb hits. Although the American forces had suffered heavier damage, they had succeeded in stopping the Japanese thrust toward Guadalcanal.

In November 1942, Anderson participated in further operations in the waters off Guadalcanal, screening a transport group landing troops in Lunga Roads and providing call fire during landings on 4 to 6 November, and screening Enterprise during strikes against enemy shipping at Guadalcanal on 13–14 November.

From December 1942 to 23 January 1943, the ship operated with TF 16 out of Espiritu Santo on antisubmarine patrol and training. Between 23 January and 3 February, she escorted Task Unit 62.4.7 (TU 62.4.7), a merchant ship convoy, to Guadalcanal to unload, and returned to Espiritu Santo. While in the Solomons, she conducted a photographic reconnaissance and bombardment of enemy-held beaches on northern coast of Guadalcanal on 29 January in company with Wilson.

Anderson, continued to operate out of the New Hebrides Islands on hunter-killer missions, and escort runs for a fueling rendezvous with TF 67 and TF 68 until 7 March 1943. She arrived at Pearl Harbor on 22 March and received onward routing back to the United States. From 9 April to 8 June, she lay at San Francisco undergoing overhaul and repairs.

Following an escort run to Pearl Harbor and back in June, Anderson departed San Francisco on 11 July with TG 96.1 en route to Kodiak, Alaska, arriving on 21 July. Joining TG 16.17 on 30 July, she participated in bombardments of Kiska on 2 and 15 August 1943. The ship remained in the Aleutians on patrol duty until 21 September, when she departed for Pearl Harbor.

From 14 October to 1 November, Anderson lay at Wellington, New Zealand, staging with the transports for the next operation. With TF 53, she arrived at Tarawa Atoll on 19 November 1943. As a part of Fire Support Group No. 3, she took station off the eastern end of Betio on D-day, 20 November, and began conducting bombardments of assigned targets. Betio was captured by 24 November, but Anderson remained in the general area on radar picket patrol and rendered intermittent call fire until 29 November, when she departed for Pearl Harbor.

===== Battle of Kwajalein =====
By 21 December 1943, she was back in San Diego to escort the 4th Marine Division to Kwajalein. En route, Anderson was one of the units designated to conduct a diversionary strike at Wotje on 30 January 1944. As one of the leading destroyers she opened the bombardment at 0642 and began to maneuver to avoid enemy return fire. At 0646, a shell hit in her combat information center (CIC), killing the commanding officer, Lieutenant Commander John G. Tennent, III, two ensigns, and three enlisted men, and wounding 14 others. Her executive officer immediately assumed command and kept her firing until she could maneuver to seaward to act as antisubmarine screen until completion of the Wotje bombardment at noon. The next day, Anderson approached the objective islands of Roi and Namur, Kwajalein Atoll, and screened to seaward as the heavy units began the bombardment. On 1 February, while transferring her wounded, she struck an uncharted pinnacle and had to be towed to Pearl Harbor.

Following the completion of repairs on 15 June, the destroyer sailed to the southwest Pacific. Following an escort run to Oro Bay, New Guinea, Anderson arrived off Cape Sansapor, New Guinea, on 1 August with TG 77.3. During the landing operations she operated on antisubmarine station between Amsterdam Island and Cape Opmarai, then conducted patrols off Woendi Harbor, and Cape Sunsapor until 25 August. During the Morotai landings on 15 September 1944, the ship rendered call fire and conducted patrols off White beach.

===== Battle of Leyte Gulf =====
On 12 October, Anderson departed Seeadler Harbor with TG 78.2 for the landing operations at Leyte Gulf. Arriving in the area on 20 October, she took up patrol during the initial assault and until she joined TG 77.2 on 25 October. This group was under enemy air attack and Anderson fired on several planes without results. On 1 November, enemy air attacks were intense. The ship scored hits on several planes, splashing one. At 1812 on that day, a Nakajima Ki-43 "Oscar" fighter crashed into the ship's port side, aft of the break in the deck. Anderson suffered 14 dead and 22 wounded. Two of the wounded later died.

Departing Leyte on 3 November 1944 and steaming via Hollandia, Manus, and Majuro, Anderson arrived at Pearl Harbor on 29 November 1944. There she received orders to proceed to San Francisco, where she moored on 9 December to begin repairs.

===== Duty off Japan =====
On 11 May 1945, she arrived at Attu Island, Alaska where she was assigned to TG 92.2. Eight days later, Anderson took part in a bombardment of Suribachi Wan and a sweep in the Sea of Okhotsk. From 10 to 12 June, she participated in the bombardment of enemy shore installations on Matsuwa To, Kuril Islands, and another anti-shipping sweep in the Sea of Okhotsk. While the remainder of the task group entered that body of water to intercept an enemy convoy headed south from Paramushir from 23 to 25 June, Anderson, Hughes, and Trenton established a patrol east of the Kurils to thwart any attempt of the convoy to escape into the Pacific. From 15 to 22 July, Anderson conducted a patrol east of the Kurils, an anti-shipping sweep in the Sea of Okhotsk, and another bombardment of Suribachi Wan, Paramushiru To, Kuriles. Another sweep was made in the Sea of Okhotsk, coupled with another bombardment of Matsuwa To, Kuriles, on 11–12 August 1945.

Anderson remained with the Northern Pacific Force for the remainder of the war, and departed Alaskan waters for Japan on 27 August. She reached Ominato, Japan, on 8 September, and supported the occupation of northern Honshū through 30 October. She departed Japanese waters on that date, bound for the United States, and arrived at San Diego on 1 December. She was earmarked for retention in an inactive status in view of the experimental tests to which she would be subjected. Two days after Christmas, she got underway for Hawaiian waters.

=== Post-War ===
==== Operation Crossroads ====
Arriving at Pearl Harbor on 3 January 1946, Anderson was assigned to Joint Task Force 1 on 15 May, and was slated to be utilized in the tests of the atomic bomb at Bikini Atoll. She reached her ultimate destination on 30 May 1946.

On 1 July 1946, the bomb used in Test "Able" Operation Crossroads sank Anderson in Bikini lagoon. Her name was struck from the Naval Vessel Register on 25 September 1946.

== Awards ==
- American Defense Service Medal
- Asiatic-Pacific Campaign Medal with 10 battle stars for World War II service
- Navy Occupation Service Medal with "ASIA" clasp

== In media ==
Anderson was prominently displayed on a famous U.S. Navy recruitment poster of World War II which suggested people could "Join the Navy and Free the World."
