= USS Astoria (CA-34) =

New Orleans class heavy cruiser

Coordinates: 9°12′33″S 159°52′3″E

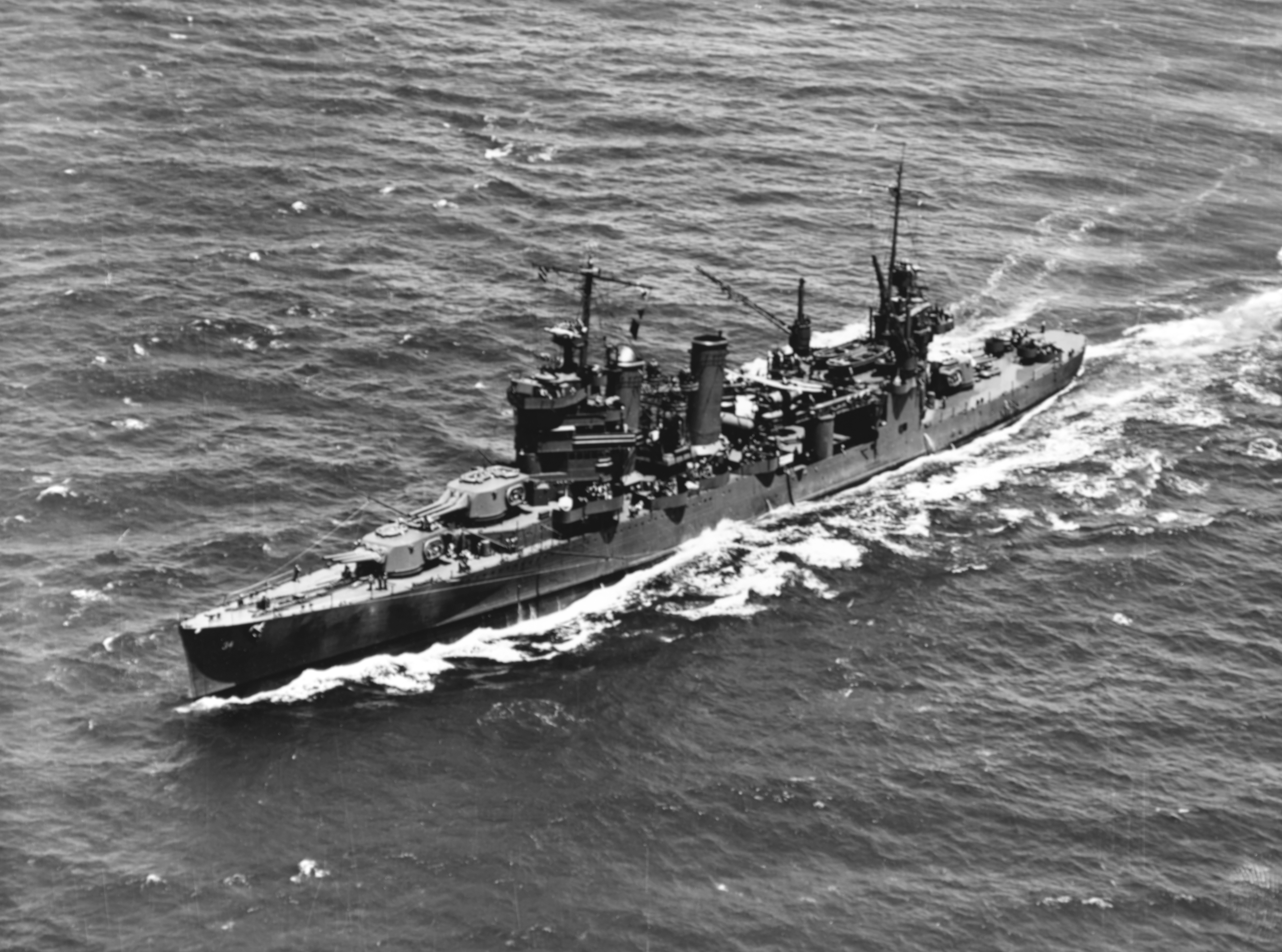
- USS Astoria (CA-34), operating in Hawaiian waters during battle practice, 8 July 1942: She appears to be recovering floatplanes from off her starboard side. Note the booms rigged below the forward superstructure to tow aircraft recovery mats, and starboard crane swung out.

History

United States
- Name: Astoria
- Namesake: City of Astoria, Oregon
- Ordered: 13 February 1929
- Awarded: 12 July 1929 (date assigned to ship yard); 2 June 1930 (beginning of construction period)
- Builder: Puget Sound Navy Yard, Bremerton, Washington
- Cost: $11,951,000 (limit of price)
- Laid down: 1 September 1930
- Launched: 16 December 1933
- Sponsored by: Miss Leila C. McKay
- Commissioned: 28 April 1934
- Reclassified: CA-34, 1 July 1931
- Identification: Hull symbol: CL-34; Hull symbol: CA-34
- Nickname(s): "Nasty Asty"
- Honors and awards: 3 × battle stars
- Fate: Sunk during the Battle of Savo Island 9 August 1942

General characteristics (as built)
- Class & type: New Orleans-class cruiser
- Displacement: 9,950 long tons (10,110 t) (standard)
- Length: 588 ft (179 m) oa; 574 ft (175 m) pp
- Beam: 61 ft 9 in (18.82 m)
- Draft: 19 ft 5 in (5.92 m) (mean); 23 ft 6 in (7.16 m) (max)
- Installed power: 8 × Babcock & Wilcox boilers; 107,000 shp (80,000 kW)
- Propulsion: 4 × Westinghouse geared turbines; 4 × screws
- Speed: 32.7 kn (37.6 mph; 60.6 km/h)
- Capacity: Fuel oil: 1,650 tons
- Complement: 104 officers 795 enlisted
- Armament: 9 × 8 in (200 mm)/55 caliber guns (3x3); 8 × 5 in (130 mm)/25 caliber anti-aircraft guns; 2 × 3-pounder 47 mm (1.9 in) saluting guns; 8 × caliber 0.50 in (13 mm) machine guns
- Armor: Belt: 3–5 in (76–127 mm); Deck: 1 1/4–2 1/4 in (32–57 mm); Barbettes: 5 in (130 mm); Turrets: 1 1/2–8 in (38–203 mm); Conning Tower: 5 in (130 mm)
- Aircraft carried: 4 × floatplanes
- Aviation facilities: 2 × Amidship catapults

General characteristics (1942)
- Armament: 9 × 8 in (200 mm)/55 caliber guns (3x3); 8 × 5 in (130 mm)/25 caliber anti-aircraft guns; 2 × 3-pounder 47 mm (1.9 in) saluting guns; 12 × single 20 mm (0.79 in) Oerlikon anti-aircraft cannons; 4 × quad 1.1 in (28 mm)/75 caliber anti-aircraft guns

The second USS Astoria (CL/CA-34) was a New Orleans-class cruiser of the United States Navy that participated in both the Battle of the Coral Sea and the Battle of Midway, but was then sunk in August 1942, at the Battle of Savo Island. Astoria was the first New Orleans-class cruiser to be laid down, but she was launched after and received a hull number higher than the lead ship New Orleans.

Immediately after the months-long Guadalcanal campaign ended in February 1943, the remaining ships of the class went through major overhauls to lessen top-heaviness due to new electrical and radar systems and advanced antiaircraft weaponry. In doing so, the ships took on a new appearance, most notably in the bridge.

== Construction and commissioning ==
Astoria was laid down on 1 September 1930, at the Puget Sound Navy Yard. Such ships, with a limit of 10,000 tons standard displacement and 8-inch calibre main guns may be referred to as "treaty" cruisers. Originally classified a light cruiser because of her thin armor, she was reclassified, after being laid down, as a heavy cruiser, because of her 8-inch guns. The term "heavy cruiser" was not defined until the London Naval Treaty in 1930. Launched on 16 December 1933, sponsored by Miss Leila C. McKay (a descendant of Alexander McKay, a member of the John Jacob Astor expedition that founded Astoria, Oregon), and commissioned on 28 April 1934, Captain Edmund S. Root in command.

During the summer of 1934, Astoria conducted a lengthy shakedown cruise, in the course of which she voyaged extensively in the Pacific. In addition to the Hawaiian Islands, the heavy cruiser also visited American Samoa, Fiji, Sydney in Australia, and Nouméa on the island of New Caledonia. She returned to San Francisco on 26 September 1934.

== Inter-war period ==
Between the fall of 1934 and February 1937, she operated as a unit of Cruiser Division 7 (CruDiv 7), Scouting Force, based at San Pedro, California. In February 1937, the warship was reassigned to CruDiv 6, though she continued to serve as an element of Scouting Force based at San Pedro. In both assignments, she carried out normal peacetime maneuvers, the culmination of which came in the annual fleet problem that brought the entire U.S. Fleet together in a single, vast exercise.

=== Special duty: Hiroshi Saito's ashes ===
At the beginning of 1939, Fleet Problem XX concentrated the fleet in the West Indies, and at its conclusion, Astoria, Richmond Kelly Turner commanding, made a hasty departure from Culebra Island on 3 March 1939 and headed for Chesapeake Bay. After taking on a capacity load of stores and fuel at Norfolk, Virginia, the heavy cruiser proceeded north to Annapolis, Maryland, where she embarked the remains of the former Japanese ambassador to the United States, the late Hiroshi Saito, for the voyage to Japan, a gesture that expressed America's gratitude to the Japanese for returning the body of the late U.S. ambassador to Japan, Edgar Bancroft, in the cruiser Tama in 1926. Astoria sailed from Annapolis on 18 March 1939, accompanied by Naokichi Kitazawa, second secretary of the Japanese Embassy in Washington.

Arriving in the Panama Canal Zone soon thereafter, where "various high officials and a delegation from the Japanese colony in Panama paid their respects to Saito's ashes," Astoria got underway for Hawaii on 24 March. She moored at Honolulu on 4 April, the same day that Madame Saito and her two daughters arrived on board the passenger liner Tatsuta Maru. Two days later, the heavy cruiser proceeded westward across the Pacific.

Accompanied by the destroyers Hibiki, Sagiri, and Akatsuki, Astoria steamed slowly into Yokohama harbor on 17 April, with her U.S. ensign at half-mast and the Japanese flag at the fore. The warship fired a 21-gun salute, which was returned by the light cruiser Kiso. American sailors carried the ceremonial urn ashore that afternoon, and funeral ceremonies took place the following morning.

After the solemn state funeral, the Japanese showered lavish hospitality on the visiting cruiser and her men. Captain Turner, for his part, pleased Ambassador to Japan Joseph C. Grew by his diplomatic role in the proceedings; the naval attaché in Tokyo, Captain Harold Medberry Bemis, later recorded that the choice of Turner for that delicate mission was "particularly fortunate...". In grateful appreciation of American sympathy and courtesy, a pagoda was later presented by Hirosi Saito's wife and child. That pagoda is located in front of Luce Hall at the United States Naval Academy.

Astoria sailed for Shanghai, China, on 26 April, and reached her destination on the morning of the 29th. She remained at Shanghai until 1 May. After receiving Admiral Harry E. Yarnell, commander-in-chief, Asiatic Fleet, on board for a courtesy call that morning, Astoria put to sea for Hong Kong in the afternoon. Following the visit to Hong Kong, Astoria stopped briefly in the Philippines before continuing on to Guam. When she arrived at Guam early on the morning of 21 May, the heavy cruiser was called upon to assist Penguin and Robert L. Barnes in their successful effort to refloat the grounded Army transport U. S. Grant. Soon thereafter, Astoria joined the search for noted author and adventurer Richard Halliburton, and the companions with whom he had attempted the voyage from Hong Kong to San Francisco in his Chinese junk, Sea Dragon. The cruiser combed more than 162,000 sq mi (420,000 km^{2}) of the Pacific, without success, before she discontinued the search on 29 May.

=== Reassigned to Pearl Harbor ===
Assigned to the Hawaiian Detachment in October 1939, Astoria changed home ports from San Pedro to Pearl Harbor. The following spring, she participated in Fleet Problem XXI, the last of those major annual exercises that brought the entire U.S. Fleet together to be conducted before World War II engulfed the United States. The maneuvers took place in Hawaiian waters, and instead of returning to the West Coast at their conclusion, the bulk of the fleet joined Astoria and the Hawaiian Detachment in making Pearl Harbor their base of operations.

On 2 April 1941, Astoria departed Pearl Harbor for the U.S. West Coast. She reached Long Beach, California, on 8 April and entered the Mare Island Navy Yard on the 13th. During her refit, she received quadruple-mount 1.1 in (28 mm)/75 cal antiaircraft (AA) guns and a pedestal fitted at her foremast in anticipation of the imminent installation of the new air-search radar. Emerging from the yard on 11 July 1941, the heavy cruiser sailed for Long Beach on the 16th. Later shifting to San Pedro, Astoria sailed for Pearl Harbor on 24 July 1941.

Following her return to Hawaii on 31 July, Astoria operated between Oahu and Midway through early September. That autumn, the specter of German raiders on the prowl in the Pacific prompted the Navy to convoy its ships bound for Guam and the Philippines. Astoria escorted Henderson to Manila and thence to Guam, before returning to Pearl Harbor on 29 October. Local patrols and training, alternated with upkeep in port, occupied Astoria during the final five weeks of peace.

== World War II ==
After rising tensions in the Pacific intensified his concern over the defenses of his outlying bases at the beginning of December 1941, Admiral Husband E. Kimmel, commander-in-chief, Pacific Fleet/U.S. Fleet, ordered reinforcements, in the form of Marine Corps planes, to be ferried to Wake Island and Midway. Astoria put to sea on 5 December in the screen of Rear Admiral John H. Newton's Task Force 12 (TF 12) built around Lexington. Once TF 12 reached open sea, Lexington's air group and the 18 Vought SB2U-3 Vindicators from Marine Scout Bombing Squadron 231 (VMSB-231) bound for Midway landed on the carrier's flight deck.

When the Japanese attacked Pearl Harbor on the morning of 7 December, Astoria was some 700 mi (1,100 km) west of Hawaii steaming toward Midway with TF 12. At 09:00 the following day, the heavy cruiser Indianapolis, flagship of Vice Admiral Wilson Brown, commander, Scouting Force, joined up with TF 12, and Brown assumed command. Its ferry mission canceled, TF 12 spent the next few days searching an area to the southwest of Oahu, "with instructions to intercept and destroy any enemy ship in the vicinity of Pearl Harbor...."

The cruiser re-entered Pearl Harbor with the Lexington force on 13 December, but she returned to sea on the 16th to meet with and screen a convoy, the oiler Neches and the seaplane tender Tangier – the abortive Wake Island relief expedition. When that island fell to the Japanese on 23 December, however, the force was recalled. Astoria remained at sea until the afternoon of 29 December, when she arrived back at Oahu. When Astoria was moored in Pearl Harbor, she had about 40 sailors from the battleship California transferred to her ranks. They were survivors of 7 December, when California was sunk at Berth F4 on Battleship Row.

Astoria departed Pearl Harbor again on the morning of 31 December with TF 11, formed around Saratoga, and remained at sea into the second week of January 1942. On 11 January, the Japanese submarine I-6 torpedoed the carrier, forcing her retirement to Pearl Harbor. Astoria and her colleagues in the task force saw the crippled carrier safely into port on the morning of 13 January 1942.

After a brief respite at Pearl Harbor, Astoria returned to sea on 19 January with TF 11 – the carrier Lexington, escorted by heavy cruisers Chicago and Minneapolis, and nine destroyers – to "conduct an offensive patrol northeast of the Kingman Reef-Christmas Island line." On the afternoon of the 21st, however, TF 11 received orders to meet with Neches, and then to conduct an air raid on Wake Island, followed by a surface bombardment "if practicable." Dispatches intercepted on the 23rd, though, revealed that Neches had fallen victim to a Japanese submarine, identified later as I-17. Without the oiler's precious cargo of fuel, TF 11 could not execute the planned strike. Ordered back to Oahu,TF 11 re-entered Pearl Harbor on the morning of 24 January.

=== Southwestern Pacific cruise: TF 17 (USS Yorktown) ===
On 16 February, Astoria put back to sea for what proved to be an extended cruise in the southwestern Pacific with TF 17, built around the carrier Yorktown and comprising the heavy cruiser Louisville, destroyers Sims, Anderson, Hammann, and Walke, and the oiler Guadalupe, all under the command of Rear Admiral Frank Jack Fletcher. Initially, TF 17's orders called for operations in the vicinity of Canton Island. However, after the Japanese discovered TF 11 on its way to attack their important new base at Rabaul and sent a determined raid that hit the Lexington task force off Bougainville on 20 February, Vice Admiral Brown asked for a second carrier to strengthen his force for another crack at Rabaul. Accordingly, TF 17 received orders to aid Brown in that attempt, and Astoria steamed with Yorktown to a meeting with TF 11 that took place southwest of the New Hebrides on 6 March.

The combined force, under Brown, stood toward Rabaul until the Japanese landings at Lae and Salamaua, New Guinea, prompted a change of plans. Late on 8 March, Brown and his staff decided to shift objectives and attack the two new enemy beachheads by launching planes from the Gulf of Papua in the south and sending them across the width of New Guinea to the targets on the northern coast. Astoria, meanwhile, joined a surface force made up of heavy cruisers Chicago, Louisville, and HMAS Australia, and destroyers Anderson, Hammann, Hughes, and Sims under the command of Rear Admiral John G. Crace, that Brown detached to operate in the waters off Rossel Island in the Louisiade Archipelago. The heavy cruiser and the other warships of that force carried out a threefold mission. They secured the carriers' right flank during their operations in the Gulf of Papua; they shielded Port Moresby from any new enemy thrust; and they covered the arrival of Army troops at Nouméa.

The raids on Lae and Salamaua, conducted by 104 planes from Yorktown and Lexington on 10 March 1942 proved devastating to the Japanese, causing heavy damage to their already depleted amphibious forces by sinking three transports and a minesweeper, as well as damaging a light cruiser, a large minelayer, three destroyers, and a seaplane carrier. More importantly, the attack delayed the Japanese timetable for conquest in the Solomons and prompted them to send aircraft carriers to cover the operation. The delay, which also allowed the U.S. Navy time to marshal its forces, coupled with the dispatch of Japanese carriers led to the confrontation in the Coral Sea.

=== Battle of the Coral Sea ===
Astoria rejoined TF 17 on 14 March and patrolled the Coral Sea for the rest of March. At sea continuously since 16 February, Astoria began to run low on provisions, so Rear Admiral Fletcher detached her to replenish from Bridge at Nouméa along with Portland, Hughes. and Walke. Arriving on 1 April, the cruiser remained there only briefly, returning to sea the following day. The warship marched and countermarched across the Coral Sea for two weeks before TF 17 headed for Tongatapu, where the Yorktown force and she spent the week of 20–27 April.

About this time, intelligence reports convinced Admiral Chester Nimitz that the enemy sought to take Port Moresby, on the southeastern coast of New Guinea, and he resolved to thwart those designs. He sent TF 11, built around a refurbished Lexington and led by a new commander, Rear Admiral Aubrey W. Fitch, to join Fletcher's TF 17 in the Coral Sea. Astoria returned to sea with TF 17 on 27 April to meet with TF 11. The two carrier task forces met in the eastern Coral Sea early on the morning of 1 May.

Late in the afternoon of 3 May, Rear Admiral Fletcher received word of the Japanese occupation of Tulagi in the Solomons. Astoria screened Yorktown the following day as the carrier launched three raids on the enemy ships off Tulagi. Admiral Fletcher first considered sending Astoria and Chester to finish off the crippled ships at Tulagi with surface gunnery, but demurred and kept his force concentrated in anticipation of further action.

Next came a two-day lull on 5–6 May, during which TF 17 fueled in preparation for the impending battle. Astoria screened Yorktown on the 7th as her planes joined those from Lexington in searches and strikes that located and sank the Japanese carrier Shōhō. Japanese planes, however, located and sank the oiler Neosho and her escort, Sims.

Fletcher's carriers launched aircraft again early on the morning of 8 May, while Astoria and the other units of the screen prepared their AA batteries to meet the retaliation expected from Japanese carriers Zuikaku and Shōkaku. Enemy planes found TF 17 just before 11:00 that morning and quickly charged to the attack. Almost simultaneously, planes from Yorktown and Lexington deployed to attack the enemy task force.

The Japanese aviators concentrated almost exclusively on the American carriers as the two drew apart with their respective screening ships, ultimately putting some 6 to 8 mi (9.7 to 12.9 km) of ocean between them by the end of the battle. Torpedo bombers opened the first phase of the attack, while torpedo and dive bombers co-ordinated attacks in the second phase.

The battle action on 8 May, as Astoria's executive officer, Commander Chauncey R. Crutcher, recounted, "was short and was accompanied by intense antiaircraft fire against a determined enemy...." Astoria assisted in putting up a protective barrage over Lexington at the outset, and after the task forces separated, she shifted to the AA umbrella over Yorktown. Her gunners claimed to have splashed at least four enemy planes in the attack that "seemed to end as suddenly as it had started."

Around 12:45, Lexington – heavily damaged though apparently in satisfactory condition afloat and underway – suffered severe internal explosions that rang her death knell. Fires raged out of control, and by 16:30, her engines stopped; 90 minutes later, Captain Frederick C. Sherman ordered the ship abandoned. Once rescue operations were completed, Lexington's end was hastened by torpedoes from Phelps, and TF 17 began a slow retirement from the Coral Sea, having suffered heavy losses, but also having inflicted a decisive strategic defeat on the Japanese by barring the Port Moresby invasion.

Astoria set course for Nouméa along with Minneapolis, New Orleans, Anderson, Hammann, Morris, and Russell. That force reached its destination on 12 May, but remained only overnight. On the 13th, the other warships and she got underway for Pearl Harbor, via Tongatapu, and arrived at Oahu on 27 May.

=== Battle of Midway ===
The heavy cruiser remained in Pearl Harbor only until the 30th. On that day, she returned to sea with the hastily repaired Yorktown to prepare to meet yet another major thrust by the Japanese fleet – this one aimed at Midway. Air searches from that island spotted the enemy's Midway Occupation Force – made up of transports, minesweepers, and two seaplane carriers – early on 3 June, but the enemy carrier force eluded detection until early in the morning of the 4th. The heavy cruiser screened Yorktown as the carrier began launching strike aircraft around 08:40. While the planes took off to contribute to the destruction of the Japanese carrier force, Astoria and her colleagues prepared for the inevitable Japanese reply.

The counterstroke, however, did not come until a few minutes before noon, as Yorktown's victorious aviators began to return to their ship. Some 18 Aichi D3A1 "Val" dive bombers came in to attack the carrier. Grumman F4F-4 Wildcat fighters from Fighting Squadron 3 (VF-3) accounted for 10 of the intruders, but the remaining eight managed to penetrate the combat air patrol (CAP). Astoria teamed up with Portland and the screening destroyers to splash another two of the attackers. The remaining six, however, succeeded in attacking Yorktown, and three of those scored hits. One of the three hit the carrier's stack, causing fires in her uptakes that literally smoked Rear Admiral Fletcher and his staff out of flag plot. Arounf 13:10, he shifted his flag to Astoria.

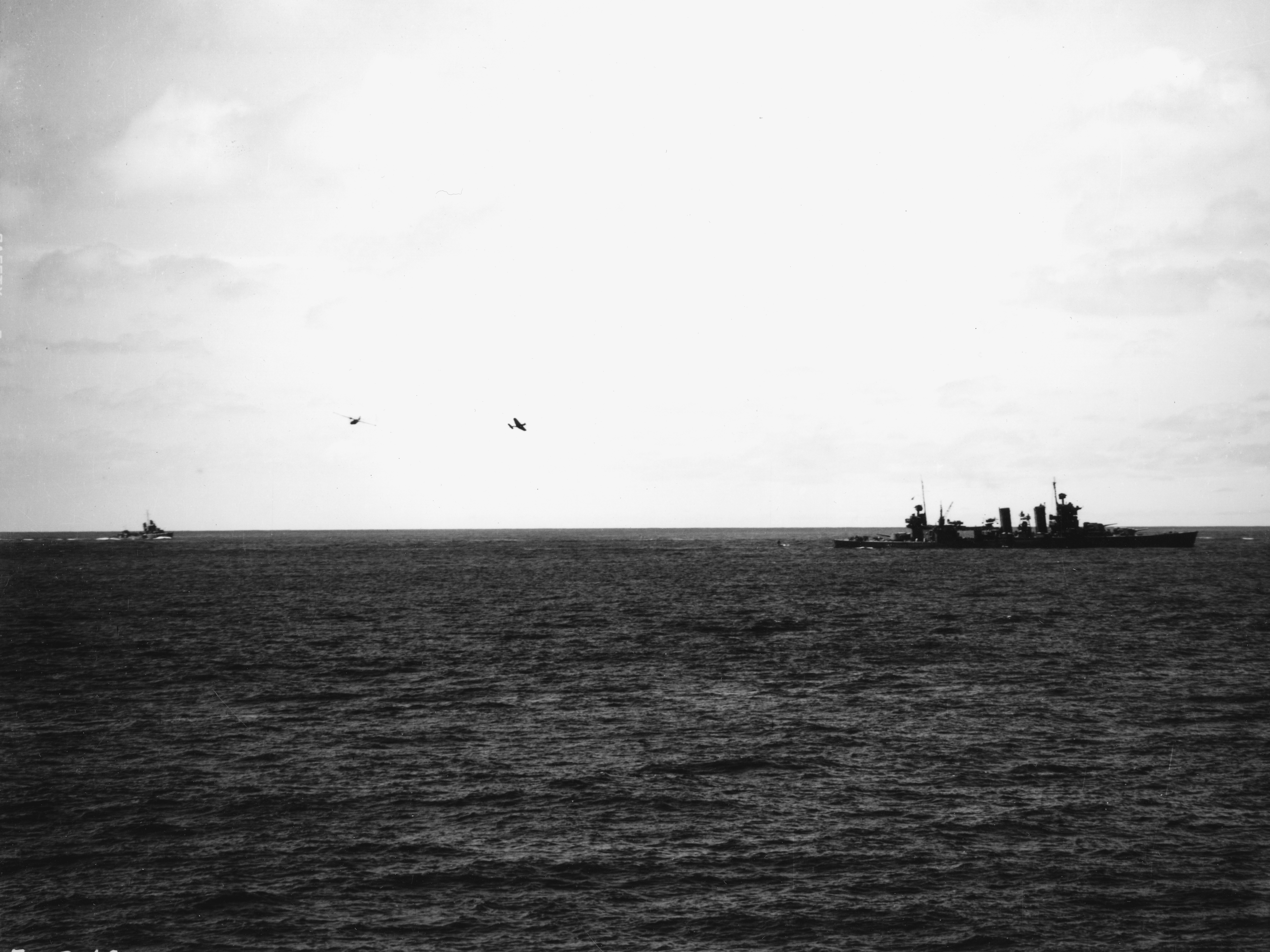
A VB-3 Douglas SBD-3 Dauntless ditching near Astoria on 4 June 1942.

Yorktown's damage-control parties worked feverishly, and by 13:40, she was again underway under her own power, albeit at only 18 to 20 kn (21 to 23 mph; 33 to 37 km/h). Near 14:30, the second attack – composed of 10 Nakajima B5N2 "Kate" torpedo bombers escorted by six Mitsubishi A6M Zero fighters – came in and eluded the weak CAP. Astoria and the other ships of the screen attempted to discourage attacks from four different directions by bringing every gun to bear and firing them into the sea to throw curtains of water into the path of the attackers. Nevertheless, four of the "Kates" made good their attacks and released their torpedoes within 500 yd (460 m). Yorktown dodged two, but the other two scored hits, which stopped the ship again. By 15:00, the order to abandon ship went out. Astoria called away lifeboats to assist in the rescue of Yorktown's survivors. That night, the heavy cruiser retired eastward with the rest of the task force to await dawn, while a single destroyer, Hughes, stood by the stricken carrier.

The following day broke with Yorktown still afloat, and efforts began to salvage the battered warship. Though the Japanese had abandoned the Midway attack and had begun retiring toward Japan, submarine I-168 had been given orders to sink Yorktown. After a 24-hour search, the enemy submarine found her quarry on the 6th and attacked with a spread of four torpedoes. One torpedo missed completely, two passed under destroyer Hammann alongside the carrier and detonated in Yorktown's hull, while the fourth broke Hammann's back. The destroyer sank in less than 4 minutes. The carrier remained afloat until early on the morning of the 7th. About dawn, she finally rolled over and sank.

Astoria remained as flagship for TF 17, as it operated north of Midway, until shortly after midday on 8 June, when TF 11 arrived on the scene, and Rear Admiral Fletcher transferred his flag to Saratoga, On 11 June, Admiral Nimitz – satisfied that the major Japanese thrust had been thwarted – ordered his carrier task forces back to Hawaii, and Astoria re-entered Pearl Harbor with them on 13 June. During the early summer of 1942, she completed repairs and alterations at the Pearl Harbor Navy Yard and carried out training in the Hawaiian operating area.

=== The Solomons (Battle of Savo Island) ===
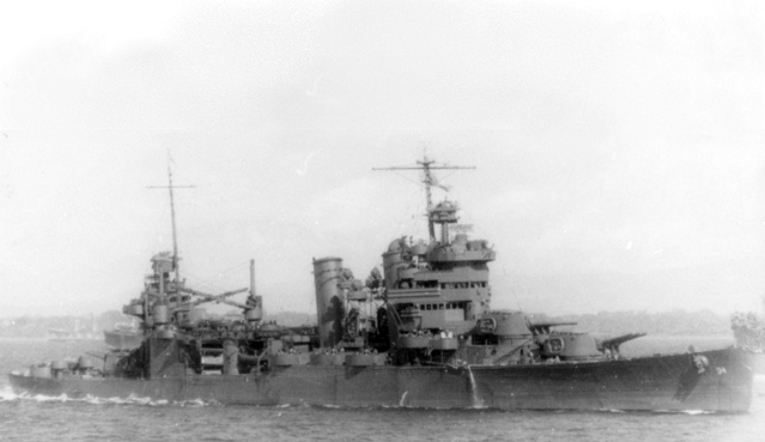
USS Astoria on 8 August 1942

By the beginning of August, Astoria had been reassigned to Task Group 62.3, Fire Support Group L, to cover the Guadalcanal-Tulagi landings. Early on the morning of 7 August, the heavy cruiser entered the waters between Guadalcanal and Florida Islands in the southern Solomons. Throughout the day, she supported the Marines as they landed on Guadalcanal and several smaller islands nearby. The Japanese launched air counterattacks on the 7th–8th, and Astoria helped to defend the transports from those attacks.

On the night of 8/9 August, a Japanese force of seven cruisers and a destroyer under Vice Admiral Gunichi Mikawa sneaked by Savo Island and attacked the American ships. At the time, Astoria had been patrolling to the east of Savo Island in column behind Vincennes and Quincy. The Japanese came through the channel to the west of Savo Island and opened fire on Chicago – HMAS Canberra force first at about 01:40 on the morning of the 9th, hitting both cruisers with torpedoes and shells. They then divided – inadvertently – into two separate groups and turned generally northeast, passing on either side of Astoria and her two consorts. The enemy cruisers began firing on that force around 01:50, and the heavy cruiser began return fire immediately. She ceased fire briefly because her commanding officer temporarily mistook the Japanese force for friendly ships, but soon resumed shooting. Astoria took no hits in the first four Japanese salvoes, but the fifth ripped into her superstructure, turning her into an inferno amidships. In quick succession, enemy shells put her number-one turret out of action and started a serious fire in the plane hangar that burned brightly and provided the enemy with a self-illuminated target.

From that moment on, deadly accurate Japanese gunfire pounded her unmercifully, and she began to lose speed. Turning to the right to avoid Quincy's fire around 02:01, Astoria reeled as a succession of enemy shells struck her aft of the foremast. Soon thereafter, Quincy veered across Astoria's bow, blazing fiercely from bow to stern. Astoria put her rudder over hard left and avoided a collision, while her battered sister ship passed aft, to starboard. As the warship turned, Kinugasa's searchlight illuminated her, and men on deck passed the order to the number-two turret to shoot out the offending light. When the turret responded with Astoria's 12th and final salvo, the shells missed Kinugasa but struck the number-one turret of Chōkai.

Astoria lost steering control on the bridge around 02:25, shifted control to central station, and began steering a zig-zag course south. Before she made much progress, though, the heavy cruiser lost all power. Fortunately, the Japanese chose that exact instant to withdraw. By 03:00, nearly 400 men, including about 70 wounded and many dead, were assembled on the forecastle deck.

Suffering from the effects of at least 65 hits, Astoria fought for her life. A bucket brigade battled the blaze on the gun deck and the starboard passage forward from that deck, and the wounded were moved to the captain's cabin, where doctors and corpsmen proceeded with their care. Eventually, however, the deck beneath grew hot and forced the wounded back to the forecastle. The bucket brigade made steady headway, driving the fire aft on the starboard side of the gun deck, while a gasoline handy-billy rigged over the side pumped a small stream into the wardroom passage below.

Bagley came alongside Astoria's starboard bow, and by 04:45, took all of the wounded off the heavy cruiser's forecastle. At that point, a small light flashed from Astoria's stern, indicating survivors on that part of the ship. Signaling the men on the heavy cruiser's stern that they had been seen, Bagley got underway and rescued men on rafts – some Vincennes survivors – and men who had been driven overboard by the fires blazing aboard Astoria.

With daylight, Bagley returned to the heavy cruiser and came alongside her starboard quarter. Since the ship appeared to be not salvagable, a crew of about 325 able-bodied men went back aboard Astoria. Another bucket brigade attacked the fires, while the ship's first lieutenant investigated all accessible lower decks. A party of men collected the dead and prepared them for burial. Hopkins came up to assist in the salvage effort around 07:00. After securing a towline, Hopkins proceeded ahead, swinging Astoria around in an effort to tow her to the shallow water off Guadalcanal. A second gasoline-powered handy-billy, transferred from Hopkins, promptly joined the struggle against the fires. Wilson soon arrived on the scene, coming alongside the cruiser near 09:00 to pump water into the fire forward. Called away at 10:00, Hopkins and Wilson departed, but the heavy cruiser received word that Buchanan was on the way to assist in battling the fires, and that Alchiba was coming to tow the ship.

==== Sinking ====
Nevertheless, the fire below decks increased steadily in intensity, and those topside could hear explosions. Her list increased, first to 10° and then 15°. Her stern lowered in the dark waters, and her bow was distinctly rising. All attempts to shore the shell holes – by then below the waterline due to the increasing list – proved ineffective, and the list increased still more. Buchanan arrived at 11:30, but could not approach due to the heavy port list. Directed to stand off the starboard quarter, she stood by while all hands assembled on the stern, which was now wet with seawater. With the port waterway awash at noon, Commodore William G. Greenman gave the order to abandon ship.

Astoria turned over on her port beam, rolled slowly, and settled by the stern, disappearing completely by 12:16. Buchanan lowered two motor whaleboats, and although interrupted by a fruitless hunt for a submarine, came back and assisted the men in the water. Alchiba, which arrived on the scene just before Astoria sank, rescued 32 men. Not one man from the salvage crew lost his life. Officially, 219 men were reported missing or killed.

== Rediscovery ==
The wreck of USS Astoria was discovered in early 2015 during a sonar-mapping project of Iron Bottom Sound led by Microsoft co-founder Paul Allen. The wreck lies upright in roughly 860 m (2,820 ft) of water. As with her sister ships, the bow forward of A turret detached during the sinking, and it now lies on top of the seaplane hanger aft.

== Awards ==
Astoria earned three battle stars during World War II.

== See also ==
- See List of U.S. Navy losses in World War II for other Navy ships lost in World War II.
