= Most decorated US Naval vessels of World War II =

This list catalogs the most honored US Naval vessels of the Second World War. It is placed in descending order of earned Battle Stars; descending accorded unit recognitions; descending ship size by type; and ascending hull number. It contains only vessels that earned 15 or more Battle Stars for World War II service.

Honors awarded that are not listed may include:

- Honors awarded by countries other than the United States (e.g., Philippine Presidential Unit Citation, British Admiralty Pennant)
- Honors awarded to all units for serving active duty during World War II; including active duty before US entry in the war (e.g., American Defense Service Medal, American Campaign Medal, Asiatic-Pacific Campaign Medal, World War II Victory Medal)
- Honors awarded to vessels for campaigns other than World War II service (e.g. Korean War service, Vietnam War service).

Vessel	World War II service awards
USS Enterprise (CV-6)	20 Battle Stars Presidential Unit Citation; Navy Unit Commendation
USS San Diego (CL-53)	18 Battle Stars (Note: The Naval History and Heritage Command notes 15 battle stars for San Diego.)
USS San Francisco (CA-38)	17 Battle Stars Presidential Unit Citation
USS O'Bannon (DD-450)	17 Battle Stars Presidential Unit Citation
USS New Orleans (CA-32)	17 Battle Stars,
USS Minneapolis (CA-36)	17 Battle Stars
USS Maury (DD-401)	16 Battle Stars Presidential Unit Citation
USS Nicholas (DD-449)	16 Battle Stars Presidential Unit Citation
USS Buchanan (DD-484)	16 Battle Stars Presidential Unit Citation
USS Portland (CA-33)	16 Battle Stars Navy Unit Commendation
USS Russell (DD-414)	16 Battle Stars
USS Saufley (DD-465)	16 Battle Stars
USS Thresher (SS-200)	15 Battle Stars Navy Unit Commendation
USS North Carolina (BB-55)	15 Battle Stars
USS Morris (DD-417)	15 Battle Stars
USS Fletcher (DD-445)	15 Battle Stars
USS Narwhal (SS-167)	15 Battle Stars
