= USS San Diego (CL-53) =

Atlanta-class light cruiser

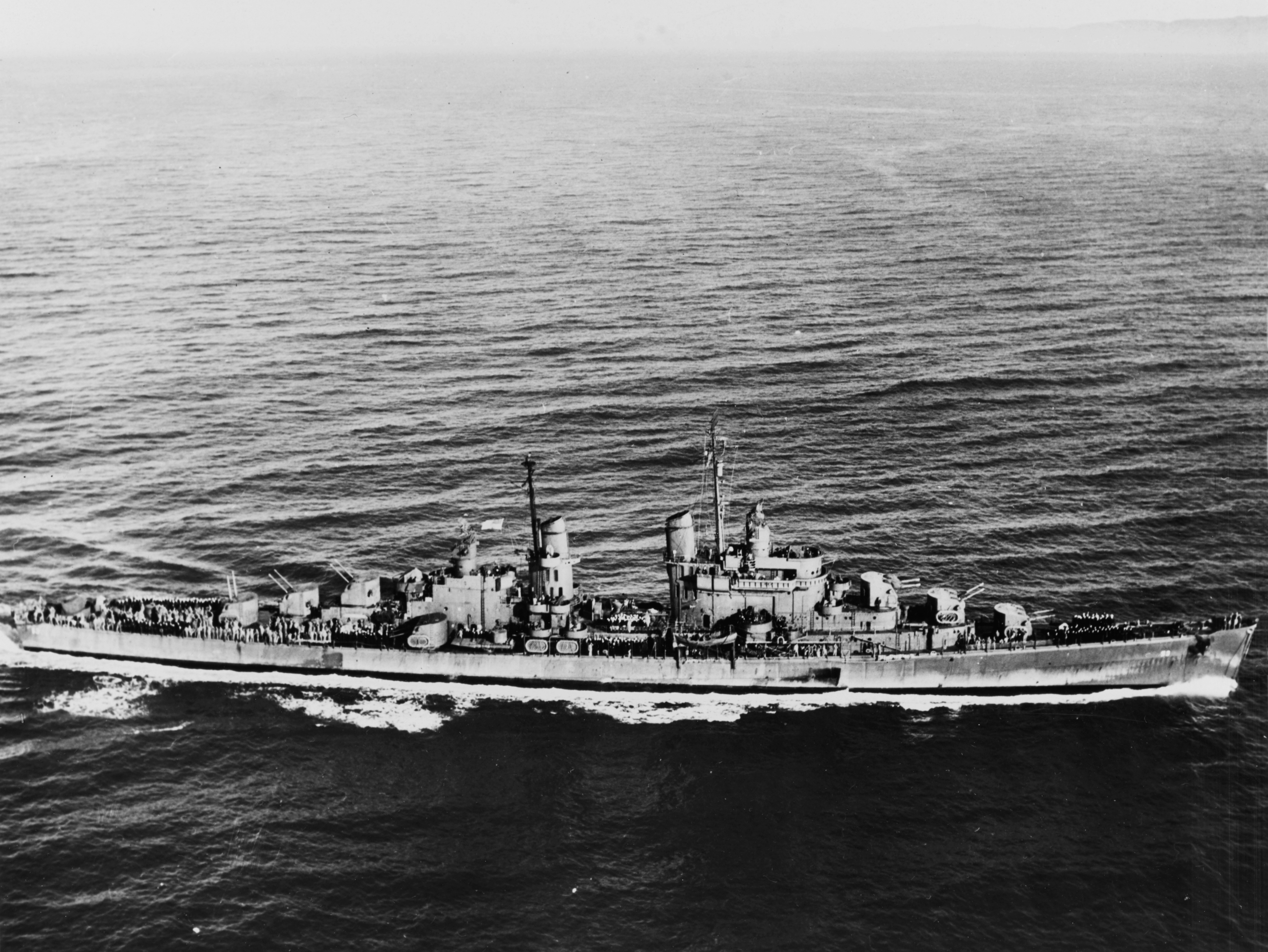
- USS San Diego, 8 March 1944

History

United States
- Name: San Diego
- Namesake: City of San Diego, California
- Builder: Bethlehem Shipbuilding Corporation's Fore River Shipyard, Quincy, Massachusetts
- Laid down: 27 March 1940
- Launched: 26 July 1941
- Sponsored by: Grace Legler Benbough
- Commissioned: 10 January 1942
- Decommissioned: 4 November 1946
- Reclassified: CLAA-53, 18 March 1949
- Stricken: 1 March 1959
- Identification: Hull symbol:CL-53; Hull symbol:CLAA-53; Code letters:NCDF
- Honors and awards: 18 × battle stars
- Fate: Sold for scrap December 1960

General characteristics (as built)
- Class & type: Atlanta-class light cruiser
- Displacement: 6,718 long tons (6,826 t) (standard); 8,340 long tons (8,470 t) (max)
- Length: 541 ft 6 in (165.05 m) oa
- Beam: 53 ft (16 m)
- Draft: 20 ft 6 in (6.25 m) (mean); 26 ft 6 in (8.08 m) (max)
- Installed power: 4 × Steam boilers; 75,000 shp (56,000 kW)
- Propulsion: 2 × geared turbines; 2 × screws
- Speed: 32.5 kn (37.4 mph; 60.2 km/h)
- Complement: 796 officers and enlisted
- Armament: 16 × 5 in (127 mm)/38 caliber Mark 12 guns (8×2); 16 × 1.1 in (28 mm)/75 anti-aircraft guns (4×4); 8 × single 20 mm (0.79 in) Oerlikon anti-aircraft cannons; 8 × 21 in (533 mm) torpedo tubes; 6 × depth charge projectors; 2 × depth charge tracks
- Armor: Belt: 1.1–3 3/4 in (28–95 mm); Deck: 1 1/4 in (32 mm); Turrets: 1 1/4 in (32 mm); Conning Tower: 2 1/2 in (64 mm)

General characteristics (1945)
- Armament: 16 × 5 in (127 mm)/38 caliber Mark 12 guns (8×2); 4 × quad 40 mm (1.6 in) Bofors anti-aircraft guns; 13 × 20 mm (0.79 in) Oerlikon anti-aircraft cannons; 8 × 21 in (533 mm) torpedo tubes; 6 × depth charge projectors; 2 × depth charge tracks

Service record
- Part of: Fast Carrier Task Force
- Operations: Solomon Islands campaign; Gilbert and Marshall Islands campaign; Mariana and Palau Islands campaign; Volcano and Ryukyu Islands campaign
- Awards: 18 battle stars

The USS San Diego (CL-53) was an Atlanta-class light cruiser of the United States Navy, commissioned just after the US entry into World War II, and active throughout the Pacific theater. Armed with 16 5 in (127 mm)/38 cal DP anti-aircraft guns and 16 Bofors 40 mm AA guns, the Atlanta-class cruisers had one of the heaviest anti-aircraft broadsides of any warship of World War II.

San Diego was one of the most decorated US Naval vessels of World War II, being awarded 18 battle stars, and was the first major Allied warship to enter Tokyo Bay after the surrender of Japan. Decommissioned in 1946, the ship was sold for scrapping in December 1960.

== Construction ==
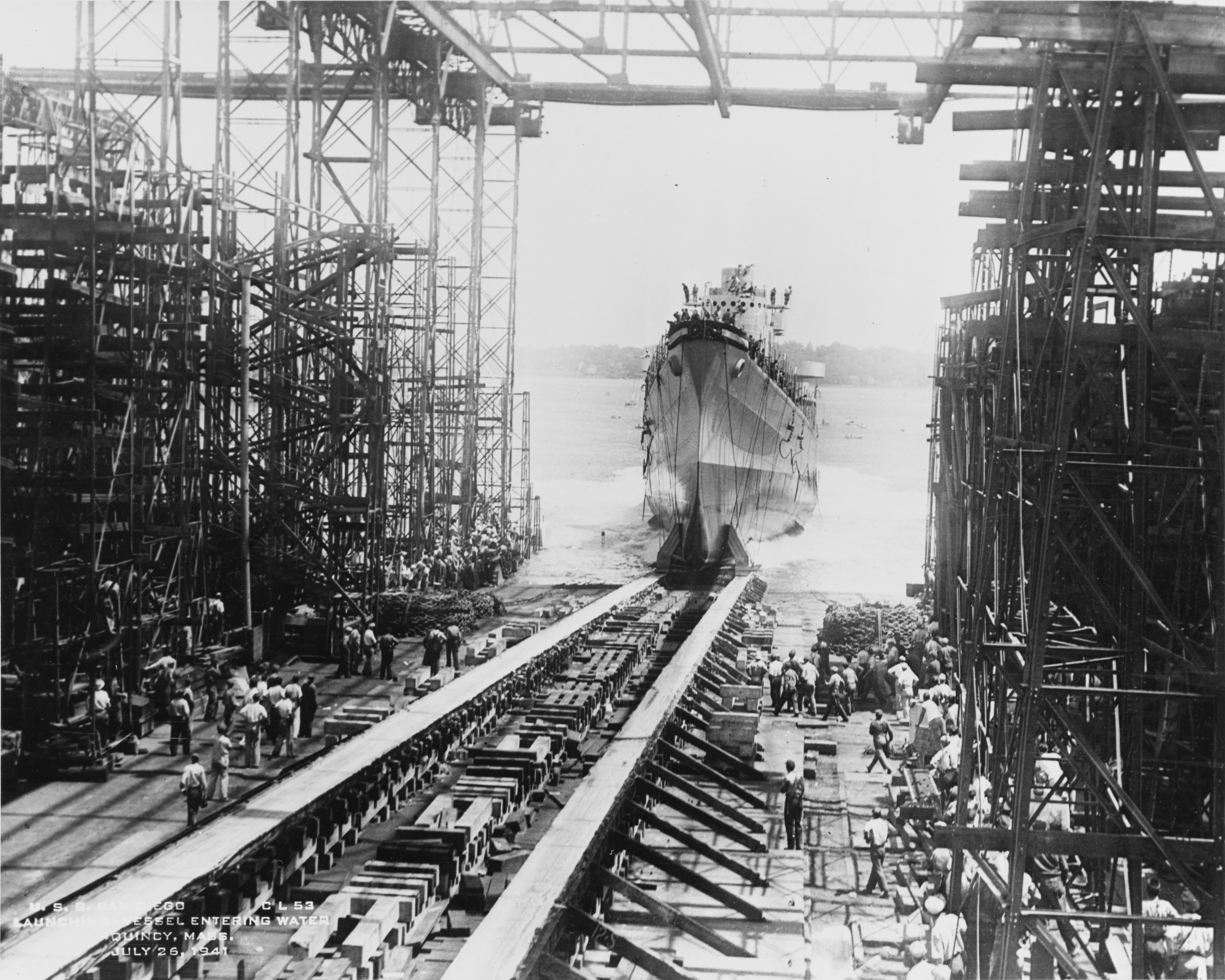
Launching of San Diego on 26 July 1941

San Diego was laid down on 27 March 1940 by Bethlehem Steel in Quincy, Massachusetts, sponsored by Grace Legler Benbough (wife of Percy J. Benbough, then-mayor of San Diego), launched on 26 July 1941, and acquired by the Navy and commissioned on 10 January 1942.

The City of San Diego selected U. S. Representative Edouard V. M. Izac (D-California), a retired lieutenant commander, to present a silver service set for use on the cruiser.

== Service history ==
=== 1942–1943 ===
After shakedown training in Chesapeake Bay, San Diego sailed via the Panama Canal to the west coast, arriving at her namesake city on 16 May 1942. Escorting Saratoga at best speed, San Diego barely missed the Battle of Midway. On 15 June, she began escort duty for Hornet in operations in the South Pacific. Early in August, she supported the first American offensive of the war, the invasion of the Solomons at Guadalcanal. With powerful air and naval forces, the Japanese fiercely contested the American thrust and inflicted heavy damage; San Diego witnessed the sinking of Wasp on 15 September and of Hornet on 26 October.

San Diego gave antiaircraft protection for Enterprise as part of the decisive three-day Naval Battle of Guadalcanal from 12–15 November 1942. After several months of service in the dangerous waters surrounding the Solomon Islands, San Diego sailed via Espiritu Santo, New Hebrides, to Auckland New Zealand, for replenishment.

At Noumea, New Caledonia, the light cruiser joined Saratoga, the only American carrier available in the South Pacific, and HMS Victorious in support of the invasion of Munda, New Georgia, and of Bougainville. On 5 November and 11 November 1943, she joined Saratoga and Princeton in highly successful raids against Rabaul. San Diego served as part of Operation Galvanic, the capture of Tarawa in the Gilbert Islands. She escorted Lexington, damaged by a torpedo, to Pearl Harbor for repairs on 9 December. San Diego continued on to San Francisco for installation of modern radar equipment, a Combat Information Center and 40 mm antiaircraft guns to replace her obsolete 1.1 in (27 mm) batteries.

=== 1944 ===
She joined Vice Admiral Marc Mitscher's Fast Carrier Task Force at Pearl Harbor in January 1944 and served as an important part of that mighty force for the remainder of the war. Her rapid-fire guns protected the carriers against aerial attack. San Diego participated in "Operation Flintlock", the capture of Majuro and Kwajalein, and "Catchpole", the invasion of Eniwetok, in the Marshall Islands from 31 January to 4 March. During this period, Task Force 58 (TF 58) delivered a devastating attack against Truk, the Japanese naval base known as the "Gibraltar of the Pacific."

San Diego steamed back to San Francisco for more additions to her radar and then rejoined the carrier force at Majuro in time to join in raids against Wake and Marcus Islands in June. She was part of the carrier force covering the invasion of Saipan, participated in strikes against the Bonin Islands, and shared in the victory of the First Battle of the Philippine Sea on 19–20 June. After a brief replenishment stop at Eniwetok, San Diego and her carriers supported the invasion of Guam and Tinian, struck at Palau, and conducted the first carrier raids against the Philippines. On 6 and 8 August, she stood by as the carriers gave close air support to Marines landing on Peleliu, Palau Islands.

On 21 September, the Task Force struck at the Manila Bay area. After replenishing at Saipan and Ulithi, she sailed with TF 38 in its first strike against Okinawa. From 12–15 October, the carriers pounded the airfields of Formosa while San Diego's guns shot down two of the nine Japanese attackers in her sector and drove the others away; however, some enemy planes got through and damaged Houston and Canberra. San Diego helped escort the two crippled cruisers out of danger to Ulithi. After rejoining the fast carrier force, she successfully rode out Typhoon Cobra in December, despite heavy rolling of the ship.

=== 1945 ===
In January 1945, TF 38 entered the South China Sea for attacks against Formosa, Luzon, Indochina, and southern China. The force struck Okinawa before returning to Ulithi for replenishment.

San Diego next participated in carrier operations against the home islands of Japan, the first since the Doolittle Raid of 1942. The carrier force finished the month of February with strikes against Iwo Jima.

On 1 March, San Diego and other cruisers were detached from the carrier force to bombard Okino Daijo Island in support of the landings on Okinawa. After another visit to Ulithi, she joined in carrier strikes against Kyūshū, again shooting down or driving away enemy planes attacking the carriers. On the night of 27–28 March, San Diego participated in the shelling of Minami Daito Jima; on 11 April, and again on 16 April, her guns shot down two attackers. She helped furnish anti-aircraft protection for ships damaged by suicide attacks and escorted them to safety. After a stop at Ulithi, she continued as part of the carrier force supporting the invasion of Okinawa, until she entered an advanced base drydock at Guiuan, Samar Island, Philippines, for repairs and maintenance.

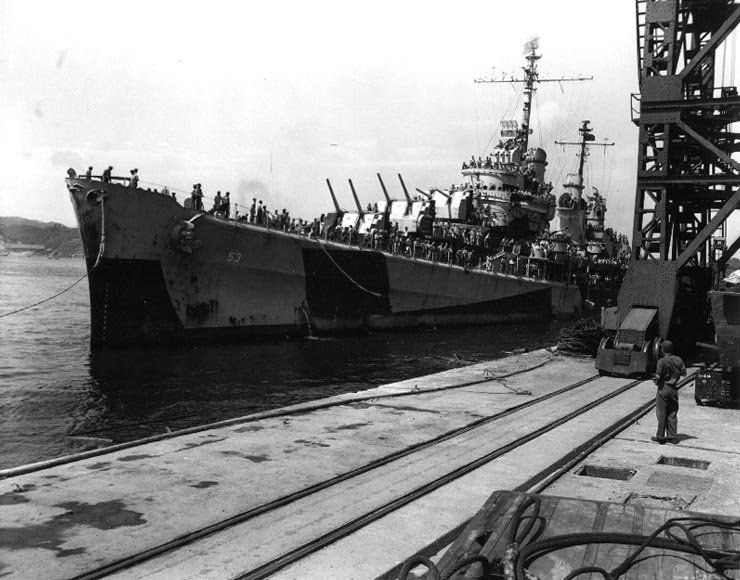
San Diego arrives at Yokosuka Naval Base, 30 August 1945

She then served once more with the carrier force operating off the coast of Japan from 10 July until hostilities ceased. On 27 August, San Diego was the first major Allied warship to enter Tokyo Bay since the beginning of the war, and she helped in the occupation of the Yokosuka Naval Base and the surrender of the Japanese battleship Nagato. After having steamed over 300,000 mi (480,000 km) in the Pacific, she returned to San Francisco on 14 September 1945. San Diego gave further service as part of "Operation Magic Carpet" in bringing American troops home.

=== Decommissioning and sale ===
San Diego was decommissioned and placed in the Pacific Reserve Fleet on 4 November 1946, berthed at Bremerton, Washington. She was redesignated CLAA-53 on 18 March 1949. 10 years later, she was struck from the Naval Vessel Register, on 1 March 1959. She was sold in December 1960 to Todd Shipyards, Seattle, Washington. Her bell is on the current San Diego (LPD-22).

== Awards ==
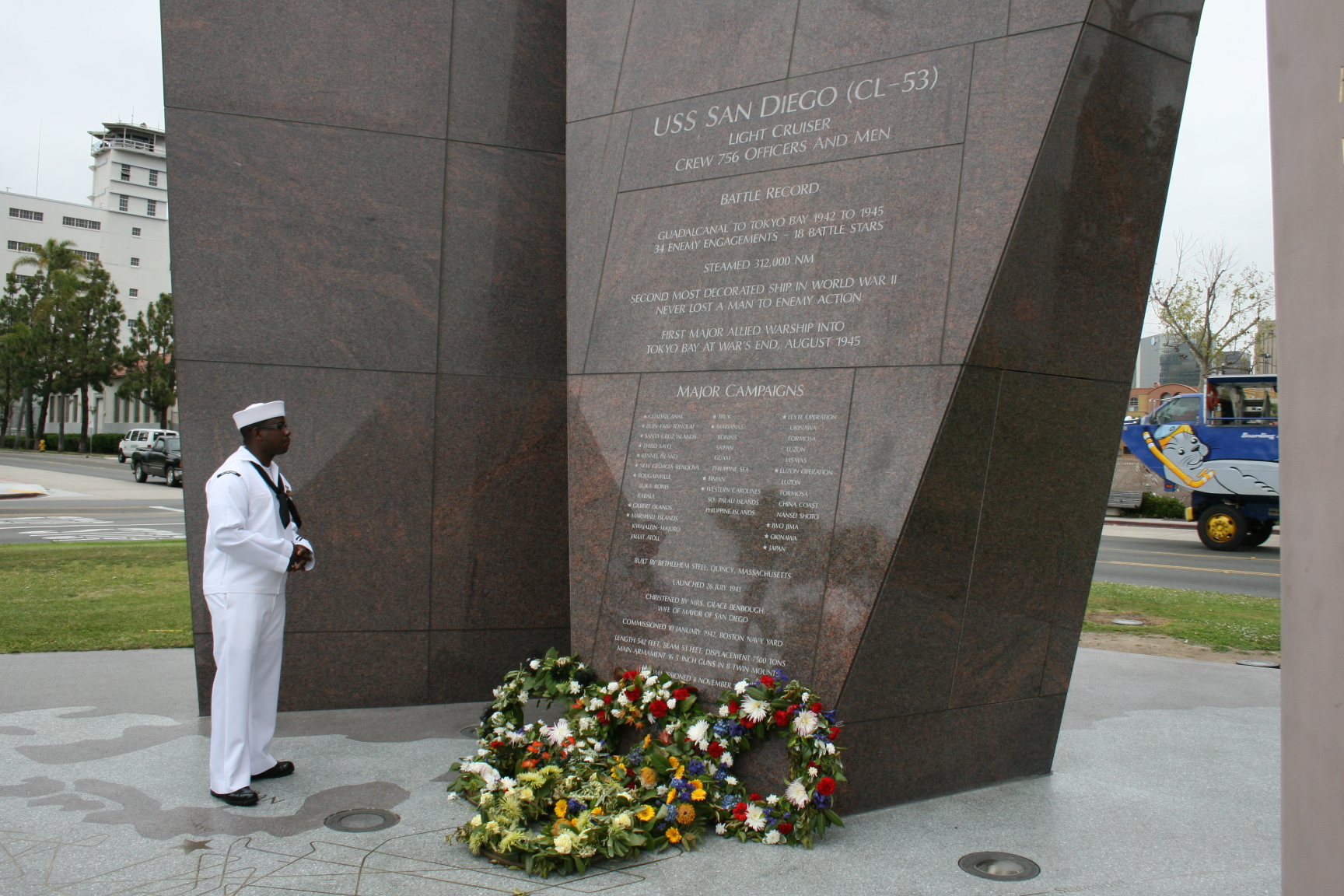
USS San Diego (CL 53) memorial, April 2012.

USS San Diego (CL-53) received 18 Battle Stars for service in World War II, placing her among the most decorated US Naval vessels of World War II.

Following is a list of the campaigns participated in:

- Guadalcanal Capture
- Buin-Faisi-Tonolai Raid
- Santa Cruz Islands
- Guadalcanal (Third Savo)
- Rennel Island Jan.
- New Georgia-Rendova-Vaugunu
- Buka-Bonins Strike
- Gilbert Islands Occupation
- Kwajelein-Wotje
- Truk Attack, 16–17 February 1944
- Saipan-Pagan Attacks
- Southern Palau Islands
- Southern Palau Islands, Philippine Islands Assaults
- Okinawa Attack
- Formosa Attacks
- China Coast Attacks
- Iwo Jima, 15 February To 16 March 1945
- Okinawa Assault And Occupation March, 17 To 11 June 1945
- Philippine Liberation
