= Sims-class destroyer =

Destroyer class of the US Navy

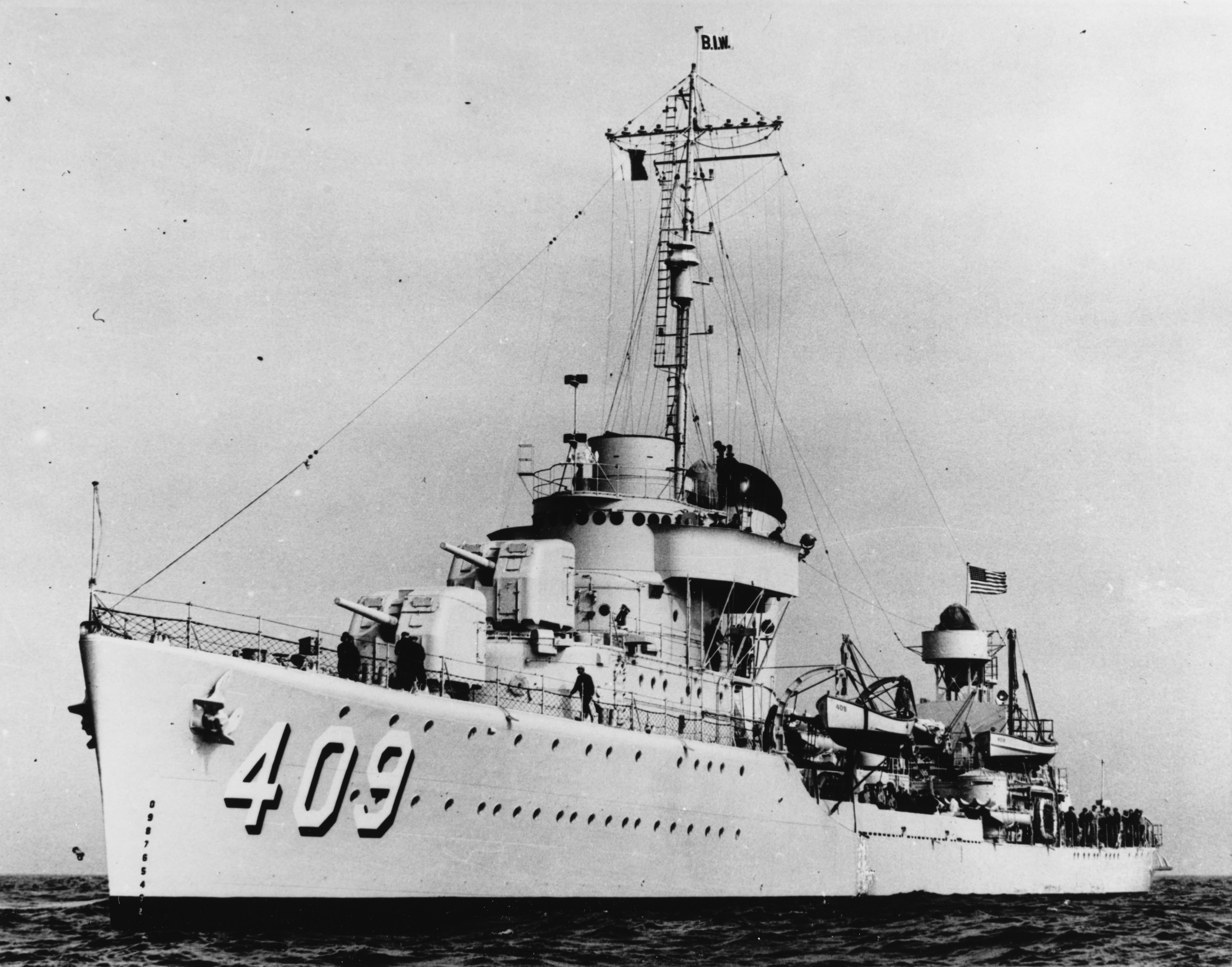
- USS Sims on trials in 1939, still missing its Mk37 director

Class overview
- Name: Sims class
- Builders: Bath Iron Works, ME (2); Federal Shipbuilding, NJ (2); Newport News Shipbuilding, VA (2); Boston Navy Yard, MA (2); Norfolk Naval Shipyard VA (2); Charleston Navy Yard, SC (1); Philadelphia Naval Shipyard, (1)
- Operators: United States Navy
- Preceded by: Benham class
- Succeeded by: Benson class
- Built: 1937–1940
- In commission: 1939–1946
- Completed: 12
- Lost: 5
- Retired: 7

General characteristics
- Type: Destroyer
- Displacement: 1,570 tons (light standard); 2,293 tons (full load)
- Length: 348 ft 3 in (106.15 m)
- Beam: 36 ft 1 in (11.00 m)
- Draft: 13 ft 4 in (4.06 m)
- Installed power: 3 Babcock & Wilcox boilers, 2 geared steam turbines, 51,138 shp (38,134 kW) on trials
- Propulsion: 2 shafts
- Speed: 37 knots (69 km/h; 43 mph) on trials
- Range: 5,640 nmi (10,450 km; 6,490 mi) at 12 knots (22 km/h; 14 mph)
- Complement: 10 officers, 182 enlisted (peacetime); 16 officers, 235 enlisted (wartime)
- Sensors & processing systems: Mk37 GFCS (introduced); 1 × SC radar
- Armament: As designed: 5 × 5 in (127 mm)/38 cal Mark 12 guns (5×1); 4 × .50 caliber machine guns (12.7 mm); 12 × 21 inch (533 mm) torpedo tubes (3 × 4) (one mount centerline); 2 × depth charge racks; Typical 1941: 4 × 5 in (127 mm)/38 cal Mark 12 guns (4×1); 8 × .50 caliber (12.7 mm) machine guns; 8 × 21 inch (533 mm) torpedo tubes (2 × 4) (both mounts centerline); 2 × depth charge racks; Typical 1944: 4 × 5 in (127 mm)/38 cal Mark 12 guns (4×1); 4 × 40 mm Bofors guns (1.6 in) (2 × 2); 4 × 20 mm Oerlikon guns (0.8 in); 8 × 21 inch (533 mm) torpedo tubes (2 × 4) (both mounts centerline); 6 × K-gun depth charge throwers; 2 × depth charge racks
- Notes: fuel capacity: 444 tons

The Sims-class destroyers were built for the United States Navy, and commissioned in 1939 and 1940. These twelve ships were the last United States destroyer class completed prior to the American entry into World War II. All Sims-class ships saw action in World War II, and seven survived the war. No ship of this class saw service after 1946. They were built under the Second London Naval Treaty, in which the limit on destroyer standard displacement was lifted, but an overall limit remained. Thus, to maximize the number of destroyers and avoid developing an all-new design, the Sims class were only 70 tons larger as designed than previous destroyers. They are usually grouped with the 1500-ton classes and were the sixth destroyer class since production resumed with the Farragut class in 1932.

The class served extensively in World War II, and five of the class were lost in the war. Of the five ships lost, four were at the hands of the Japanese and one at the hands of the Germans. The class served on Neutrality Patrols in the Atlantic in 1940-41. Except for Roe, Wainwright, and Buck, the class was transferred to the Pacific shortly after the attack on Pearl Harbor. All of the ships saw extensive combat service. At the war's end in August 1945, three of the seven survivors were undergoing overhauls that were left unfinished, and were ultimately scrapped. The remaining four seaworthy ships were used as targets during the 1946 Operation Crossroads atomic tests at Bikini Atoll. One was sunk by the first blast, while the other three were sunk as targets two years later after serving as experimental platforms.

== Design ==
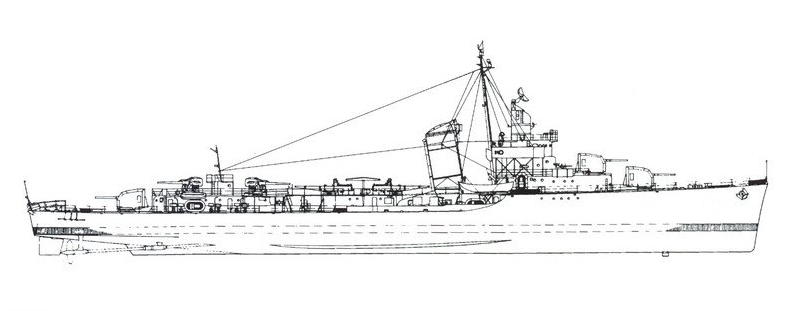
USS Russell, possibly as in 1941 with Mount 53 still equipped and K-guns added.

Compared with the Benhams, the Sims class were increased 8 feet (2.4 m) in hull length, and started a trend of increased size that led to the numerous larger 2100-ton destroyer classes that marked wartime construction. The class was designed by Gibbs & Cox. They incorporated streamlining of the bridge structure and the forward part of the hull, in an attempt to increase speed and improve fuel economy. They also had an additional 5-inch gun, with the torpedo tubes re-arranged so one less quadruple mount could be used while maintaining an eight-tube broadside.

When Anderson, first of the class to be delivered in early 1939, was found to be 150 tons overweight and dangerously top-heavy due to insufficient metacentric height, it touched off a redesign and rebuilding of the class. One 5-inch (127 mm) gun (No. 3) and one quad torpedo tube mount were removed, with another torpedo tube mount relocated to the centerline. It was determined that an underestimate by the Bureau of Engineering of the weight of a new machinery design was responsible, and that the Bureau of Construction and Repair did not have sufficient authority to detect or correct the error during the design process. Acting Secretary of the Navy Charles Edison proposed consolidation of the design divisions of the two bureaus. When the bureau chiefs could not agree on how to do this, he replaced both chiefs in September 1939. The consolidation into the new Bureau of Ships was finally effected by a law passed by Congress on 20 June 1940.

=== Engineering ===
The Sims class nearly duplicated the advanced machinery of the preceding Benham class, they were the last built with the boiler rooms adjacent forward and the engine rooms adjacent aft and therefore the last one-stack US destroyers. Steam pressure was 600 psi (4,100 kPa) (one reference says 565 psi), superheated to 715 °F (379 °C). Features that improved fuel economy included boiler economizers, double reduction gearing, and cruising turbines. The main turbines developed 51,138 shp (38,134 kW) on Sims' trials and were manufactured by Westinghouse.

=== Armament ===
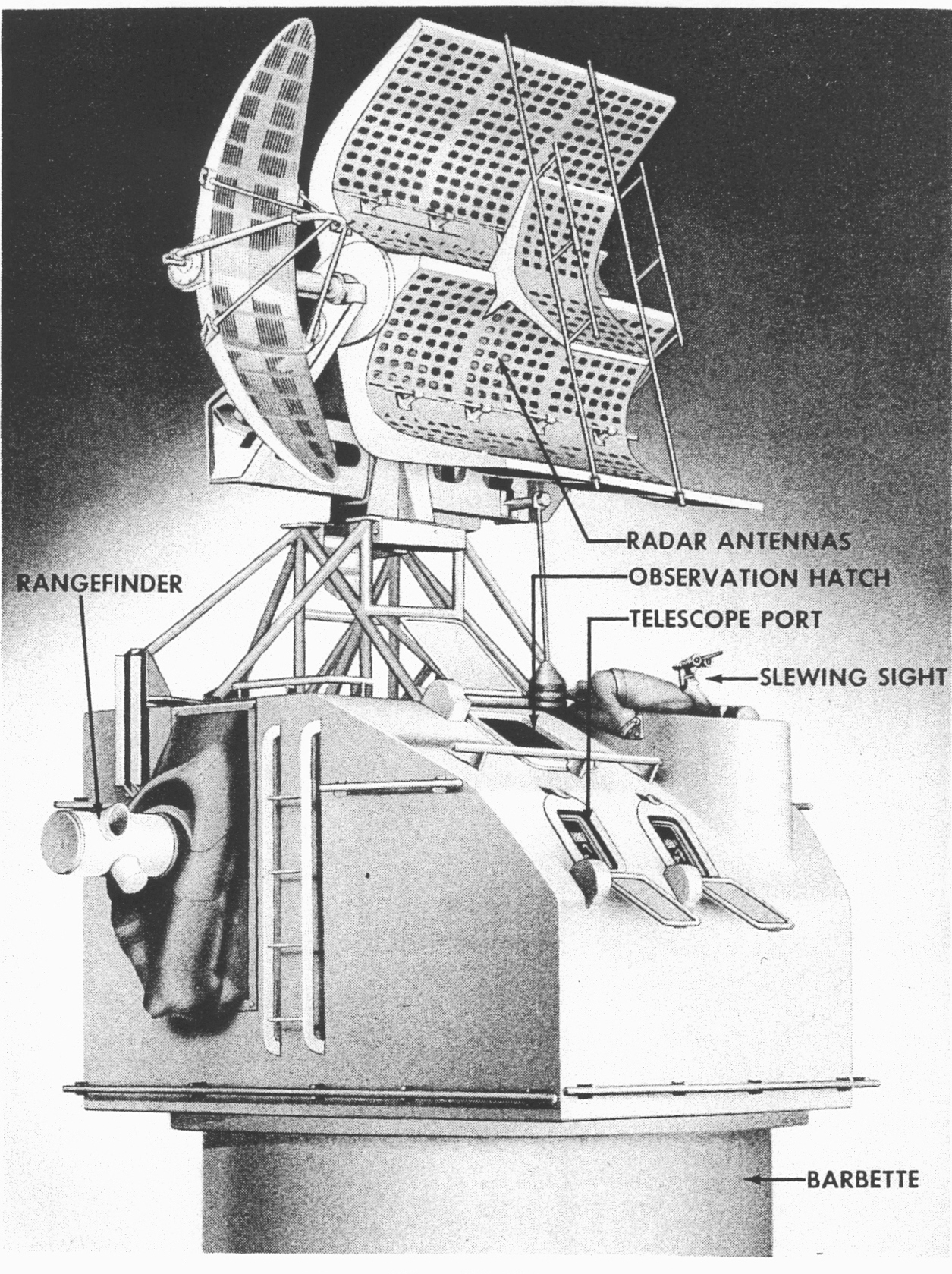
Mk 37 Director c. 1944 with Mk 12 (rectangular antenna) and Mk 22 "orange peel" radar antennas

The Sims class introduced the advanced Mark 37 Gun Fire Control System. With a turret-mounted gun director as in previous systems, the Mark 37 system incorporated the Ford Mark 1 Fire Control Computer mounted in a plotting room deep in the hull, which enabled automatic aiming of guns against surface or air targets with firing solutions in near real-time. The system would evolve and be used extensively to control most 5-inch guns on destroyers and larger ships, and remained in service on US ships until the 1970s.

The class was completed with five 5-inch dual purpose guns (anti-surface and anti-aircraft (AA)); the two forward mounts and the aftermost mount were enclosed. The class proved to be top-heavy, and a quadruple torpedo mount and one 5-inch gun (No. 3) were removed by 1941. Early units were completed with 12 torpedo tubes in three quad mounts, one mounted centerline, the others port and starboard, while later ships were completed (and all eventually modified) with eight in two quad mounts, all on the centerline. The Mark 15 torpedo was equipped. The 5 inch guns were removed some time after the torpedo tubes were removed in most cases.

The as-built light AA armament of four .50 caliber machine guns (12.7 mm), the same as previous 1500-ton classes, was inadequate. This was partially remedied by increasing the number of guns to eight by 1941. As with most US Navy warships, the light AA armament was replaced with 40 mm Bofors and 20 mm Oerlikon guns within 18 months after the attack on Pearl Harbor. Initially, this was four 40 mm in two twin mounts and four single 20 mm guns. In 1945, with the emerging kamikaze threat and the dwindling threat from Japanese surface ships, Mustin, Morris, and Russell had all torpedo tubes removed in favor of four additional 40 mm guns for a total of eight in four twin mounts and were authorized replacement of the 20 mm single mounts by twin mounts; the latter part was not completed.

The as-built anti-submarine armament of two depth charge racks was augmented by up to six K-gun depth charge throwers during the war.

== Service ==
The class served extensively in World War II, and five of the class were lost in the war. Of the five ships lost, four were at the hands of the Japanese and one at the hands of the Germans. The class served on Neutrality Patrols in the North Atlantic, Caribbean, and South Atlantic in 1940–41. Except for Roe, Wainwright, and Buck, the class was transferred to the Pacific shortly after the attack on Pearl Harbor, where they often screened aircraft carriers. Two were sunk as a direct result of this duty by the same torpedo spreads that killed their carriers; Hammann escorting USS Yorktown in the Battle of Midway and O'Brien escorting USS Wasp on 15 September 1942 (O'Brien did not sink until 19 October).

Walke became the only ship of the class to be sunk in action against enemy surface warships when she attempted to attack Japanese warships at the naval battle of Guadalcanal, 15 November 1942, but was ambushed by Japanese destroyers. She was hit once from a six torpedo spread, fired from the Japanese destroyer Ayanami, that blew off her bow as she promptly went down and sank.

In the Atlantic, Wainwright escorted the ill-fated convoy PQ 17, and with Roe supported Operation Torch, the invasion of North Africa. Buck, damaged in a collision, missed Torch but was sunk by a U-boat off Salerno, Italy in 1943. The remainder of the class saw hard service in the Pacific. At the war's end in August 1945, three of the seven survivors were undergoing overhauls that were left unfinished, and were ultimately scrapped. The remaining four seaworthy ships were used as targets during the 1946 Operation Crossroads atomic tests at Bikini Atoll. One was sunk by the first blast, while the other three were sunk as targets two years later after serving as experimental platforms.

== Ships in class ==
Ships of the Sims destroyer class
Name	Hull no.	Builder	Laid down	Launched	Commissioned	Decommissioned	Fate
Sims	DD-409	Bath Iron Works	15 July 1937	8 April 1939	1 August 1939	—N/a	Sunk by Japanese aircraft in the Battle of the Coral Sea, 7 May 1942 (14 survivors)
Hughes	DD-410	Bath Iron Works	15 September 1937	17 June 1939	21 September 1939	28 August 1946	Damaged during Operation Crossroads atomic tests at Bikini Atoll, July 1946. Sunk as target, 16 October 1948.
Anderson	DD-411	Federal Shipbuilding, Kearny, New Jersey	15 November 1937	4 February 1939	19 May 1939	28 August 1946	Sunk during Operation Crossroads atomic tests (Test "Able"), at Bikini Atoll, 1 July 1946
Hammann	DD-412	Federal Shipbuilding, Kearny, New Jersey	17 January 1938	4 February 1939	11 August 1939	—N/a	Sunk by I-168 during the Battle of Midway with the same torpedo spread (salvo) that also sank USS Yorktown, 6 June 1942. (80 killed)
Mustin	DD-413	Newport News Shipbuilding	20 December 1937	8 December 1938	15 September 1939	29 August 1946	Damaged during Operation Crossroads atomic tests at Bikini Atoll, July 1946. Scuttled off Kwajalein, 18 April 1948.
Russell	DD-414	Newport News Shipbuilding	20 December 1937	8 December 1938	3 November 1939	15 November 1945	Sold for scrap, September 1947
O'Brien	DD-415	Boston Navy Yard	31 May 1938	20 October 1939	2 March 1940	—N/a	Torpedoed by I-19, with the same torpedo spread (salvo) which also sank USS Wasp and damaged USS North Carolina, 15 September 1942. Sank 19 October 1942 after departing Suva, Fiji while en route to Pearl Harbor for repairs.
Walke	DD-416	Boston Navy Yard	31 May 1938	20 October 1939	27 April 1940	—N/a	Torpedoed and sunk by the destroyer Ayanami in the Naval Battle of Guadalcanal, 15 November 1942 (88 killed)
Morris	DD-417	Norfolk Navy Yard	7 June 1938	1 June 1939	5 March 1940	9 November 1945	Sold for scrap, 2 August 1947
Roe	DD-418	Charleston Navy Yard	23 April 1938	21 June 1939	5 January 1940	30 October 1945	Sold for scrap, August 1947
Wainwright	DD-419	Norfolk Navy Yard	7 June 1938	1 June 1939	15 April 1940	29 August 1946	Damaged in the Operation Crossroads atomic tests at Bikini Atoll, July 1946. Sunk as target in Pacific, 5 July 1948.
Buck	DD-420	Philadelphia Naval Shipyard	6 April 1938	22 May 1939	15 May 1940	—N/a	Sunk by U-616 off Salerno, Italy, 9 October 1943 (150 killed)

== See also ==
- Benham-class destroyer
- Gridley-class destroyer
- List of destroyer classes of the United States Navy
- List of United States Navy losses in World War II
