= USS Morris (DD-417) =

Sims-class destroyer

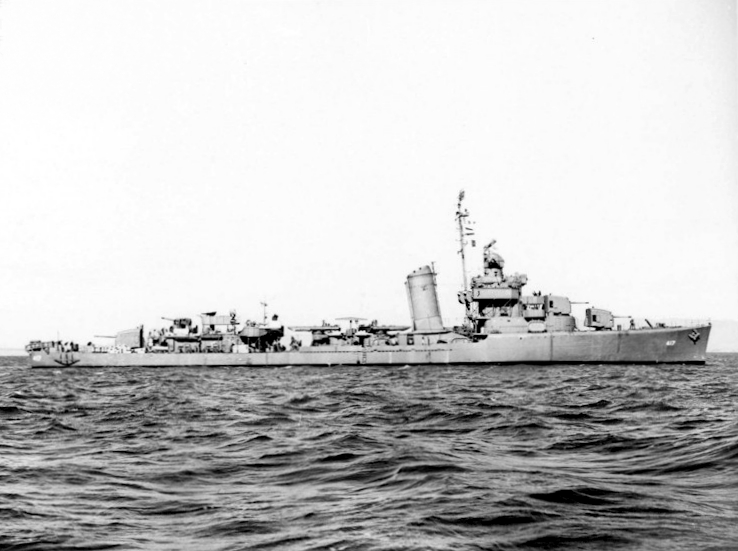
- Morris in October 1943

History

United States
- Builder: Norfolk Navy Yard, Portsmouth, Virginia
- Laid down: 7 June 1938
- Launched: 1 June 1939
- Commissioned: 5 March 1940
- Decommissioned: 9 November 1945
- Stricken: 28 November 1945
- Honors and awards: American Defense Service Medal ("Fleet" clasp, "A" device); Asiatic-Pacific Campaign Medal ( 15 × battle stars); World War II Victory Medal
- Fate: Sold on 2 August 1947, scrapped

General characteristics
- Class & type: Sims-class destroyer
- Displacement: 1,570 long tons (1,600 t) (std); 2,211 long tons (2,246 t) (full)
- Length: 348 ft 3 1/4 in (106.2 m)
- Beam: 36 ft 1 in (11.0 m)
- Draft: 13 ft 4.5 in (4.1 m)
- Propulsion: High-pressure super-heated boilers; Geared turbines with twin screws; 50,000 hp (37,000 kW)
- Speed: 35 knots (65 km/h; 40 mph)
- Range: 3,660 nmi (6,780 km; 4,210 mi) at 20 kn (37 km/h; 23 mph)
- Complement: 192 (10 officers/182 enlisted)
- Armament: 5 × 5 inch/38, in single mounts; 4 × .50 caliber/90, in single mounts; 8 × 21 inch torpedo tubes in two quadruple mounts; 2 × depth charge track, 10 depth charges

USS Morris (DD-417), a World War II-era Sims-class destroyer in the service of the United States Navy, was named after Commodore Charles Morris. She was among the most decorated US Naval vessels of World War II.

== Construction and commissioning ==
Morris was laid down at the Norfolk Navy Yard, Portsmouth, Virginia, on 7 June 1938; launched on 1 June 1939, sponsored by Mrs. Charles R. Nutter, great-granddaughter of Commodore Morris; and commissioned on 5 March 1940, with Commander Harry B. Jarrett in command.

== Service history ==
Morris, flagship of Destroyer Squadron 2, followed her shakedown with routine training schedules until the summer of 1941 when she joined the North Atlantic Patrol. With the entry of the United States into World War II, she entered Charleston Navy Yard, where she was equipped with the first fire-control radar for a destroyer. By 3 January 1942, she was underway for Pearl Harbor, rejoining her squadron there at the end of February.

Attached to Task Force 17 (TF 17), the destroyer sailed on 16 March for Noumea, and into her first major enemy engagement, the Battle of the Coral Sea. Prior to the battle, she guarded the carriers of TF 17 as their planes struck at enemy shipping in Tulagi Harbor and in the Louisiade Archipelago. From 4–8 May, she splashed one enemy plane and damaged two while screening for Yorktown and Lexington, and when the latter was heavily damaged, pulled alongside to rescue some 500 survivors. Damage received during the rescue forced her back to Pearl Harbor, where hurried repairs put her back into condition for the Battle of Midway a month later. In that action, she again pulled alongside Yorktown to rescue over 500 survivors.

Morris's next action came in late August, when she joined TF 61 in support of the Guadalcanal campaign. For the next 2 months, she screened carriers and patrolled among the Solomon Islands. On 25 October, following a 3-day independent sweep through the Gilbert Islands, she rejoined TF 17 and took part in the Battle of the Santa Cruz Islands. During the action, she destroyed six aircraft and once more came to the rescue of Hornet, from which she took on 550 survivors. As in other rescue operations, her superstructure was damaged, but after repairs at Espiritu Santo, she was back in the Guadalcanal area, first operating with Enterprise and then as supply unit escort to Russell.

In May 1943, Morris departed the southern Pacific and sailed north to support the capture and occupation of Attu Island and Kiska, the Aleutian end of the Japanese ribbon defense. Then she returned to San Francisco, California, for a 7-week overhaul. In November, she again joined an air support group escorting Liscome Bay, Coral Sea, and Corregidor in the Gilberts offensive, during which she went to aid Liscome Bay. As the task forces pressed further into the central Pacific, Morris sailed with them into the Marshall Islands. On 30 January 1944, she led a column of warships in a shore bombardment mission against Wotje Atoll. Thence, she steamed to Kwajalein Atoll, where while providing close fire support off Namur, she wiped out a Japanese counterattack force from an adjacent island. In mid-February, she departed Kwajalein and moved with TG 51.11 to support the seizure and occupation of Eniwetok. Arriving on 17 February, she continued carrier operations until 24 February, when she sailed for Pearl Harbor.

Morris returned to combat in April 1944, when as a unit of the 7th Fleet, she took part in all the western New Guinea landings, beginning with Hollandia. In May and June, she give fire support in the Toem-Wakde-Sarmi areas and then during the Biak Island operation. In July, she went against enemy guns on Noemfoor Island and then at Cape Sansapor. In August, she participated in operations against Halmahera and Morotai and then began preparations for the initial invasion of the Philippines.

On 16 October, with TG 8.6, she got underway for Leyte Gulf. Safely delivering her charges, transports with the first reinforcement groups aboard, on the 21st, she took up antiaircraft station and for several days experienced meetings with the newest Japanese tactics, the kamikaze. Throughout the next month, she continued to escort troops and supplies to Leyte. With the dawn of the new year, 1945, she was en route north for the Luzon operations. Arriving within the week, she participated in preinvasion bombardment and then provided fire support during the landings on 9 January. For 18 days, she patrolled, bombarded shore positions, and fought off kamikaze] planes.

Detached from the 7th Fleet after Luzon, Morris rejoined the 5th Fleet and prepared for Okinawa. On 1 April, she arrived off Kerama Retto with TG 51.11. For the next 5 days, she escorted transports and oilers and cruised in various assigned sectors on antiaircraft and antisubmarine patrols. On 6 April, while patrolling station A-11, a Nakajima B5N "Kate", carrying either a heavy bomb or torpedo, closed in on her. Morris's guns scored hits and set the plane afire, but could not stop it. Shortly after 18:15, it crashed into the ship on the portside, between the number 1 and 2 guns. Fires caused by the explosions spread quickly. Two hours were needed to bring them under control, with another 30 minutes to extinguish them. Morris then returned to Kerama Retto, where temporary repairs somewhat corrected her demolished bow and subsequent draft of 18 feet, 3 inches, her large protrusion of plating on the starboard side, and her damaged steering. The ship suffered 13 dead and 45 wounded.

On 22 May, she started out across the Pacific, and on 18 June, she entered the San Francisco Naval Shipyard. Declared neither seaworthy nor habitable, she was decommissioned on 9 November. Struck from the Naval Vessel Register on 28 November, she was stripped of gear and sold to Franklin Shipwrecking on 2 August 1947, then resold to the National Metal and Steel Corporation in Los Angeles on 17 July 1949, where she was scrapped.

== Awards ==
Morris received 15 battle stars for her action in World War II, placing her among the most decorated US Naval vessels of World War II.
