= USS Russell (DD-414) =

Sims-class destroyer

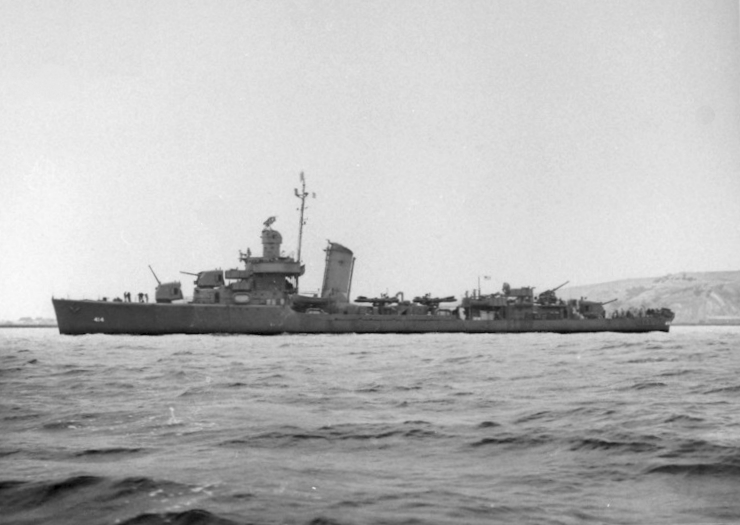
- IUSS Russell (DD-414)

History

United States
- Builder: Newport News Shipbuilding
- Laid down: 20 December 1937
- Launched: 8 December 1938
- Commissioned: 3 November 1939
- Decommissioned: 15 November 1945
- Stricken: 28 November 1945
- Honors and awards: 16 × battle stars
- Fate: Scrapped September 1947

General characteristics
- Class & type: Sims-class destroyer
- Displacement: 1,570 long tons (1,600 t) (std); 2,211 long tons (2,246 t) (full)
- Length: 348 ft 3 1/4 in (106.2 m)
- Beam: 36 ft 1 in (11.0 m)
- Draft: 13 ft 4.5 in (4.1 m)
- Propulsion: High-pressure super-heated boilers; Geared turbines with twin screws; 50,000 hp (37,000 kW)
- Speed: 35 knots (65 km/h; 40 mph)
- Range: 3,660 nmi (6,780 km; 4,210 mi) at 20 kn (37 km/h; 23 mph)
- Complement: 192 (10 officers/182 enlisted)
- Armament: 5 × 5 inch/38, in single mounts; 4 × .50 caliber/90, in single mounts; 8 × 21 inch torpedo tubes in two quadruple mounts; 2 × depth charge track, 10 depth charges
- Armor: None

USS Russell (DD-414) was a World War II-era Sims-class destroyer in the service of the United States Navy, named after Rear Admiral John Henry Russell. She was among the most decorated US Naval vessels of World War II.

Russell was laid down on 20 December 1937 by the Newport News Shipbuilding and Drydock Company, Newport News, Virginia; launched on 8 December 1938; sponsored by Mrs. Charles H. Marshall, granddaughter of Rear Admiral Russell; and commissioned on 3 November 1939.

== Service history ==
Commissioned two months after the outbreak of World War II in Europe, Russell cruised in the western Atlantic and in the Caribbean on neutrality patrol until the bombing of Pearl Harbor.

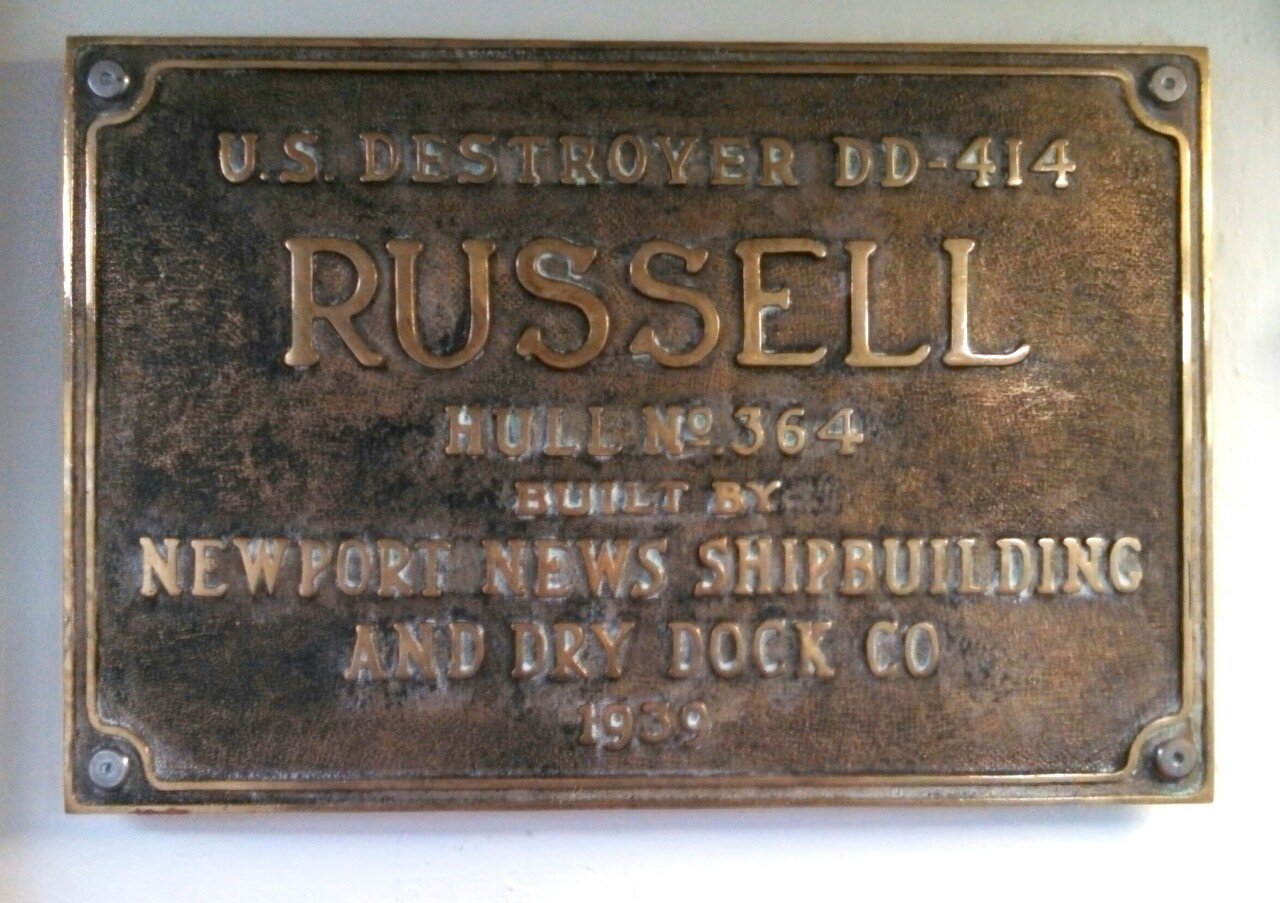
Plaque from USS Russell DD 414

=== World War II ===
==== 1942 ====
Russell was ordered to the Pacific, and she transited the Panama Canal and proceeded to San Diego, where on 6 January 1942, she sailed west, screening reinforcements to Samoa. By the time of her arrival, 20 January, the Japanese had moved into British Malaya, Borneo, the Celebes and Gilbert Islands, and the Bismarck Archipelago. Within the week, Rabaul fell and the Japanese continued on to New Ireland and the Solomons while further west they extended their occupation of the Netherlands East Indies.

On 25 January, Russell sailed north with Task Force 17 (TF 17), screened USS Yorktown (CV-5) as her planes raided Makin, Mili, and Jaluit on 1 February, then set a course for Pearl Harbor. In midmonth, the force sailed again. Diverted from its original destination, Wake Island, it covered forces establishing an airbase on Canton Island, important on the Hawaii-Samoa-Fiji route to Australia and less than 1,000 miles (1,600 km) from Makin. Raids on Rabaul and Gasmata were next ordered to cover a movement of troops to New Caledonia, but on 8 March the Japanese landed at Salamaua and Lae in New Guinea and Port Moresby was threatened. The force, again joined by the Lexington force, steamed into the Gulf of Papua, where on 10 March, planes were sent over the Owen Stanley Range to bomb the newly established Japanese bases on the Huon Gulf.

Through April, Russell continued to screen the Yorktown force, operating primarily in the ANZAC area. Detached on 3 May to screen USS Neosho (AO-23) during fueling operations with TF 11, she rejoined TF 17 early on 5 May and resumed screening duties for the force's heavier units. On 7 May in the Coral Sea, she engaged enemy planes closing the formation to threaten Yorktown and Lexington and to support Japanese forces in an assault on Port Moresby. Lexington hit and heavily damaged, but still in action, continued to recover and launch planes. Three hours later, however, she reported a serious explosion. A second followed. Her fires were no longer under control. She soon commenced abandoning ship. Russell joined her screen, circled the crippled ship as rescue ships evacuated personnel, and with the completion of that work, departed the scene of the Battle of the Coral Sea.

Retiring to Tonga, Russell debarked 170 survivors from Lexington and sailed for Pearl Harbor. Arriving on 27 May, she headed out again on 30 May, this time toward Midway Island. On 4 June, TFs 16 and 17 again met the enemy in an air duel, through which Russell steamed in the screen of Yorktown. In the afternoon, enemy torpedo planes broke through the screen and scored successfully on the carrier. The patched-up survivor of the Battle of the Coral Sea was abandoned. Russell took on 492 of her crew and aviation personnel. The next day she transferred 27 to Astoria to assist in salvage operations on the carrier, but Japanese torpedoes (from I-168) negated the effort and Yorktown and Hammann were lost. On 10 June, Russell covered the transferral of replacements from Saratoga to Hornet and Enterprise, and on 13 June, she returned to Pearl Harbor.

Engaged in training exercises for the next 2 months, Russell again sortied with TF 17 on 17 August, took station screening Hornet, and headed southwest. On the 29th, TF 17 joined TF 61, becoming Task Group 61.2 (TG 61.2). On the 31st, Saratoga took a torpedo and Russell conducted an unsuccessful submarine hunt, the first of many in the long and costly campaign for Guadalcanal. On 6 September, one of Hornet's planes dropped an explosive off Russell's starboard quarter to detonate a torpedo. Another submarine search commenced. At 1452, she established contact and dropped six 600-pound depth charges. At 1513, she sighted an oil slick 1 mile by one-half-mile, but contact was lost at 700 yards and never regained.

Through the remainder of the year, and into the new, Russell continued to operate in support of the Guadalcanal campaign. On 25–26 October, she participated in the Battle of the Santa Cruz Islands, during which she again joined in rescue operations for a sinking carrier, this time Hornet, from which she transferred the commander of TF 17, Rear Admiral George D. Murray and his staff to Pensacola, seriously wounded personnel to USS Northampton (CA-26), and other survivors to Nouméa where Russell's superstructure, damaged during rescue work, was repaired.

==== 1943 ====
In December 1942 – January 1943, she screened convoys to Guadalcanal and Tulagi, then to Rennell. In February, she screened Enterprise, then in March, resumed convoy escort work, making one run to Australia and back by mid-April.

On 1 May, the destroyer set a course for the west coast. At the end of July, after overhaul at Mare Island, she steamed north to join forces staging for the "invasion" of Kiska Island. Aleutian patrol duty followed, and with the arrival of autumn, she turned south to escort landing craft to Hawaii. In October, she continued on to Wellington, New Zealand; and, in early November, she escorted transports to the New Hebrides where she joined TF 53, then preparing to push into the Gilberts. Underway on 13 November with the Task Force, she arrived with the troop transports off Betio, Tarawa, on 20 November, then screened heavier units as they shelled the shore. Remaining in the area until 25 November, she provided gunfire support and screened the transports as they filled with Marine casualties. On 27 November, she joined TG 50.3 and, with TG 50.1, sailed for the Marshall Islands. On 4 December, carrier planes raided Kwajalein and Wotje, and on 9 December, the force returned to Pearl Harbor, whence Russell continued on to the west coast.

==== 1944 ====
On 13 January 1944, Russell, screening TG 53.5, departed the California coast. Training in the Hawaiian Islands followed. On the 22nd, the force headed west. On 30 January, Russell joined other destroyers and heavier units in shelling Wotje. On 31 January, she rejoined the main force off Kwajalein and, after initial screening duties, added her guns to the naval gunfire support line. On 2 February, she screened Carrier Division 22 (CarDiv 22) and on the 3rd, entered Kwajalein lagoon. Standing out 5 days later, she arrived at Pearl Harbor on 15 February and was directed on to Puget Sound for repairs.

Repairs completed in March, Russell returned to Hawaii in early April, then escorted Willard Holbrook to New Guinea where she rejoined DesRon 2. Arriving at Finschhafen on 4 May, she reported to the commander of TF 76 at Sudest on 6 May and commenced 5 months of intensive and navigationally difficult escort work along the New Guinea coast. Assigned initially to escort LSTs resupplying Hollandia and Aitape, she joined TF 77 on 16 May and covered LCIs and ATs to the Wakde-Sarmi area. From 17 to 20 May, she stood off Wakde, marking the approach channel on the first day of the campaigns there and providing fire support and screening services on the others. On 20 May, she returned to Humboldt Bay and 5 days later sailed with LSTs for Biak to commence Operation "Horlick." On 27 May, she shelled Padaido Islands, patrolled between Pai and Padaidori Islands, blasted targets on Biak, and then got underway to return to Humboldt Bay. Into June, she continued to escort convoys to and provide cover for operations at Biak and Wakde. In mid-June, she participated in a bombardment of the Toem area, then resumed escort runs along the coast. In early July, Noemfoor, with its two Japanese airfields, became the target. At midmonth Russell gained a brief respite at Manus Island, then at the end of the month commenced Operation "Globetrotter", the capture of Sansapor. Through August, she continued operations in support of the campaign and, in mid-September, moved forward to the Molucca Islands to cover the occupation of Morotai, the last stepping stone on the southern route to the Philippines and on the eastern route to Borneo and the Netherlands East Indies.

On 13 October, Russell sailed with TF 78 for the Philippines and on 20 October, as the troops of the Northern Attack Force landed south of Tacloban, patrolled off Alabat Point. On 21 October, she took up fire support duties to the north of the unloading area. Until 24 October, she remained in San Pedro Bay, resumed patrol in Leyte Gulf on 25 October, and on 26 October, got underway for New Guinea, where, in November–December, she escorted reinforcements to Leyte.

On 28 December, Russell departed Aitape for the invasion of Luzon, and steamed into the Mindoro Strait on 5 January 1945. Two days later, she joined three other destroyers in forming an interceptor force 5 miles on the starboard of the San Fabian Attack Force to destroy any enemy ships attempting a sortie from Manila Bay against the convoy. At 2230, Hinoki was detected and fired on. Hinoki exploded and sank within 20 minutes. Russell was ordered to pick up survivors from the Hinoki. Although several swimmers were seen in the water, they refused to be rescued.

==== 1945 ====
On 9 January, the force, having survived harassing attacks by planes, boats, and ships, arrived in Lingayen Gulf and Russell assumed screening duties off the transport area. For 9 days, she patrolled, illuminated, bombarded, and fought off kamikazes. From 18 to 23 January, she escorted damaged ships back to Leyte and, on 27 January, sailed north again. On 31 January, she arrived off Nasugbu Bay, covered YMSs (Motor Minesweepers) as they cleared approach channels, then fired on enemy emplacements on Nasugbu Point. Relieved in late afternoon, she returned to Lingayen Gulf, thence, on 2 February, to Leyte, New Guinea, and the Solomons.

Russell arrived at Guadalcanal on 15 February, rejoined the 5th Fleet and prepared for Operation "Iceberg", the Okinawa offensive. On 1 April, she arrived off the assault beaches and commenced screening the Northern Transport area. From 3–5 April, she patrolled north of Ie Shima, then returned to the transport area to escort a convoy to Ulithi. Returning to the Hagushi beaches with reinforcements on 21 February, she shifted to Kerama Retto, whence she patrolled in carrier operating area "Rapier", south of Okinawa, into May. Detached from carrier screening duty on 27 May, she proceeded to the Hagushi anchorage and got underway the following day for the United States and a yard overhaul.

Still undergoing overhaul at Seattle, Washington when the war ended, Russell was prepared for inactivation during September, and on 15 November, she was decommissioned. Thirteen days later she was struck from the Navy List and, in September 1947, she was sold for scrap to the National Metal and Steel Corporation, Terminal Island, Los Angeles.

== Awards ==
Russell earned 16 battle stars during World War II, making her among the most decorated US Naval vessels of World War II.
