= Ingram C. Sowell =

American rear admiral

Ingram Cecil Sowell
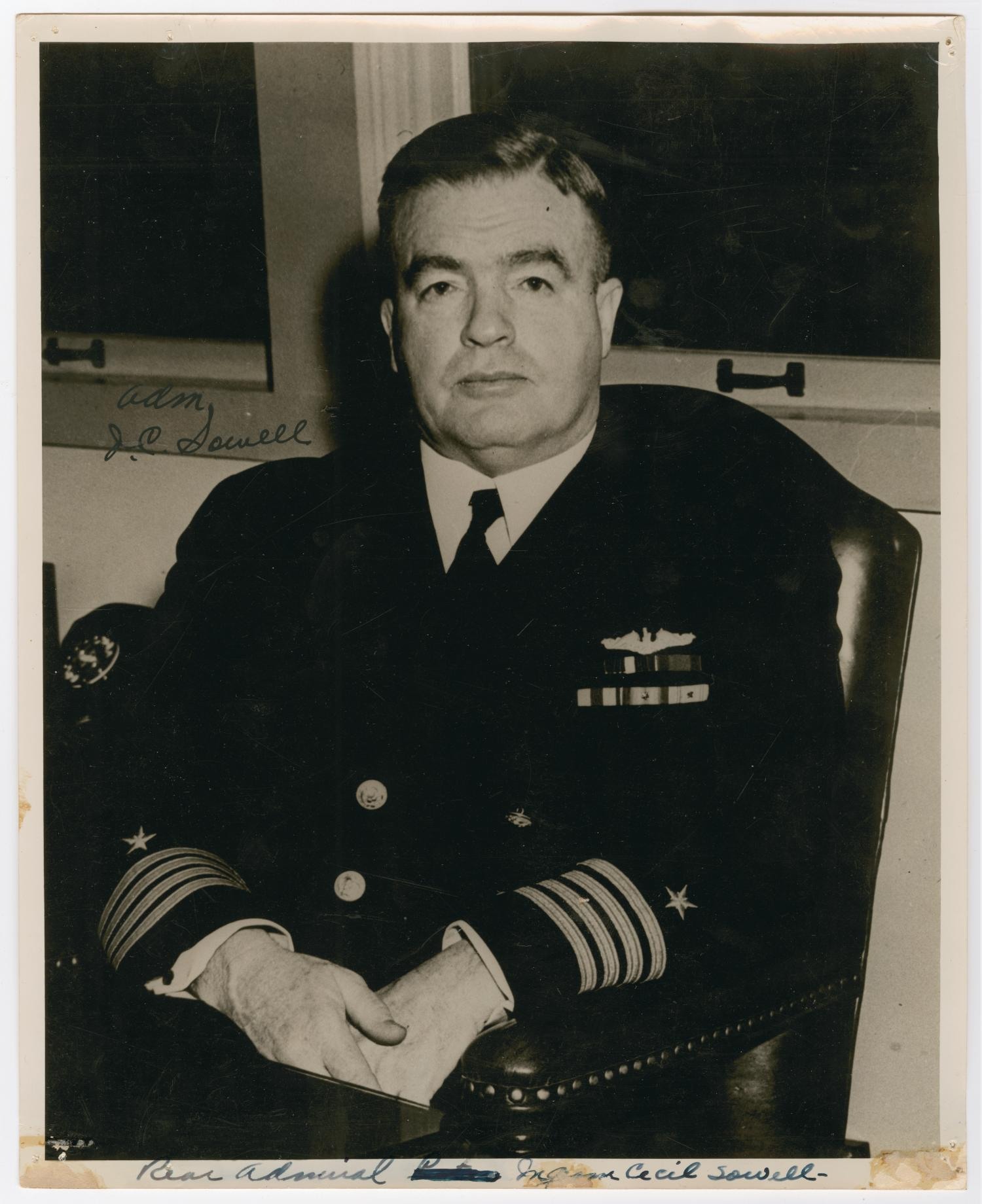
- Sowell as Captain, USN
- Born: January 2, 1892; Lawrenceburg, Tennessee, US
- Died: December 21, 1947 (aged 55); Los Angeles, California, US
- Burial place: Arlington National Cemetery
- Military career
- Allegiance: United States
- Branch: United States Navy
- Service years: 1912–1947
- Rank: Rear admiral
- Nickname: "Red"
- Commands: Inspector General, Atlantic Fleet; Battleship Division 8 Battleship Division 4 Battleship Division 5 USS Concord
- Conflicts: Veracruz Expedition; World War I: Atlantic U-boat campaign; World War II: Battle of Lingayen Gulf; Battle of Iwo Jima; Battle of Okinawa; Bombardment of Japan
- Awards: Navy Cross; Silver Star; Legion of Merit (2)

Ingram Cecil Sowell (January 2, 1892 – December 21, 1947) was a highly decorated officer in the United States Navy with the rank of rear admiral. A graduate of the United States Naval Academy, he was trained as submarine commander and distinguished himself as commanding officer of submarine USS K-2 during World War I and received Navy Cross, the United States Navy second-highest decoration awarded for valor in combat.

Sowell rose to the flag rank during World War II and commanded Naval Operating Base, Bermuda in 1943-1944. He was subsequently transferred to the Pacific theater, where he commanded several battleship divisions in the last phase of the war. Sowell died of cancer on December 21, 1947, while still on active duty as Inspector General, Atlantic Fleet.

== Early career ==
Ingram C. Sowell was born on January 2, 1892, in Lawrenceburg, Tennessee, the son of lawyer and farmer Henry Bascome Sowell and his wife Eustatia Goodloe. His parents were descendants of early settlers of Lawrence County and Ingram had together four siblings. He attended public schools in Lawrenceburg and Columbia Military Academy in Columbia, Tennessee, before received an appointment to the United States Naval Academy at Annapolis, Maryland, in July 1908.

While at the Academy, Sowell (nicknamed "Red" by classmates) excelled as an athlete and marksman and received badges as Expert Rifleman and for Expert Pistol Shot. He was a member of the wrestling and football squads and earned Football "N" for excellence in football. Sowell was a quarterback of the 1910 Navy Midshipmen football team during Army–Navy Game and although he suffered from a broken rib and probably a punctured lung, he played almost the entire game with the West Point cadets and the Navy team won 3–0.

Among his classmates were several future admirals including future Chief of Naval Operations, Louis E. Denfeld; four-star admiral DeWitt C. Ramsey; vice admirals Daniel E. Barbey, Elliott Buckmaster, Walter S. DeLany, Thomas L. Gatch, Edward Hanson, Charles P. Mason, Edward O. McDonnell, Charles H. McMorris, Alfred E. Montgomery, Mahlon Tisdale, Francis E. M. Whiting; and rear admirals Andrew C. Bennett, Richard E. Byrd, Daniel J. Callaghan, Campbell D. Edgar, and Carleton H. Wright.

Sowell graduated with Bachelor of Science degree on June 6, 1912, and was commissioned ensign on that date. He was subsequently assigned to the armored cruiser California and embarked for Nicaragua in order to protect american interests during the internal political disturbance. After a period of patrolling near Corinto, California was ordered to the west coast, where she cruised off California, and conducted patrols near Mexico in July 1914 during the ongoing Mexican Revolution. While aboard California (which was meanwhile renamed San Diego), he was promoted to lieutenant (junior grade) on June 8, 1915.

== World War I ==
In early 1917, Sowell was ordered to submarine tender Fulton stationed as base ship at Naval Submarine School New London, Connecticut. He completed submarine instruction few months later and assumed command of submarine L-2 operating along the Atlantic coast. The United States entered the World War I on April 6, 1917, and Sowell was promoted to the temporary rank of lieutenant on August 31, 1917.

By the end of March 1918, Sowell was ordered to Azores and assumed command of submarine K-2. He commanded her during a routine patrol cruises in Azorean waters to protect shipping and to deny the use of the Portuguese archipelago as a base for U-boats or as a haven for German surface raiders interspersed with periods of refit, repairs, and replenishment. During her assignment at Ponta Delgada, the submarine was dispatched in July to visit Lisbon, Portugal, where she drydocked, before making her return to Ponta Delgada in mid-August 1918. For his service with K-2, Sowell received Navy Cross, the United States Navy second-highest decoration awarded for valor in combat.

Sowell was promoted to the temporary rank of lieutenant commander on September 21, 1918, and transferred to the staff of the Commander, Naval Forces Europe under Admiral William S. Sims. He remained in that capacity for the remainder of the War.

== Interwar period ==
Following the war, Sowell returned to the United States and was sent to the Portsmouth Navy Yard for duty in connection with fitting out of submarine S-3. He was transferred to the Gunnery Exercises and Engineering Competition Office in the Navy Department in July 1920 and served under Captain William D. Leahy until October 1921.

Due to demobilization of the Navy to the peacetime strength Sowell was reverted to the rank of lieutenant and ordered to Lake Torpedo Boat Company in Bridgeport, Connecticut, where he assumed duty in connection with fitting out of submarine S-49. The submarine was commissioned on June 6, 1922, with Sowell in command and he led her during the series of experiments at Naval Submarine School New London, Connecticut. Sowell was promoted back to lieutenant commander on April 1, 1923, and transferred to submarine tender Savannah, operating in the Panama Canal Zone and Caribbean.

In August 1925, Sowell was transferred to the staff of Naval Academy at Annapolis, Maryland, and joined the Department of Navigation as an instructor. He remained there until June 1927, when he assumed command of old destroyer Henshaw, operating with the Pacific Fleet. The Henshaw was decommissioned in March 1930 for scrapping and Sowell was transferred to command of recommissioned destroyer Wasmuth, operating with the Battle Force.

During June 1931, Sowell was transferred to the Naval Station Great Lakes, Illinois, which served as the Navy's primary boot camp. He remained there until May of the following year, when he assumed command of Submarine Division 4 and was promoted to commander on June 30, 1933. His unit operated with the Atlantic Fleet and Sowell remained in command until June 1935, when he was ordered to the Naval War College in Newport, Rhode Island. He completed Senior course there one year later and was transferred to the Bureau of Construction and Repair under Rear Admiral Emory S. Land.

In November 1936, Sowell was assigned to the heavy cruiser New Orleans as Executive officer under Captain Augustin T. Beauregard. He participated in the patrols along the west coast and off Hawaii and was ordered to Naval Station San Diego in June 1938, where he assumed duty as officer-in-charge, Recruit Training School.

== World War II ==
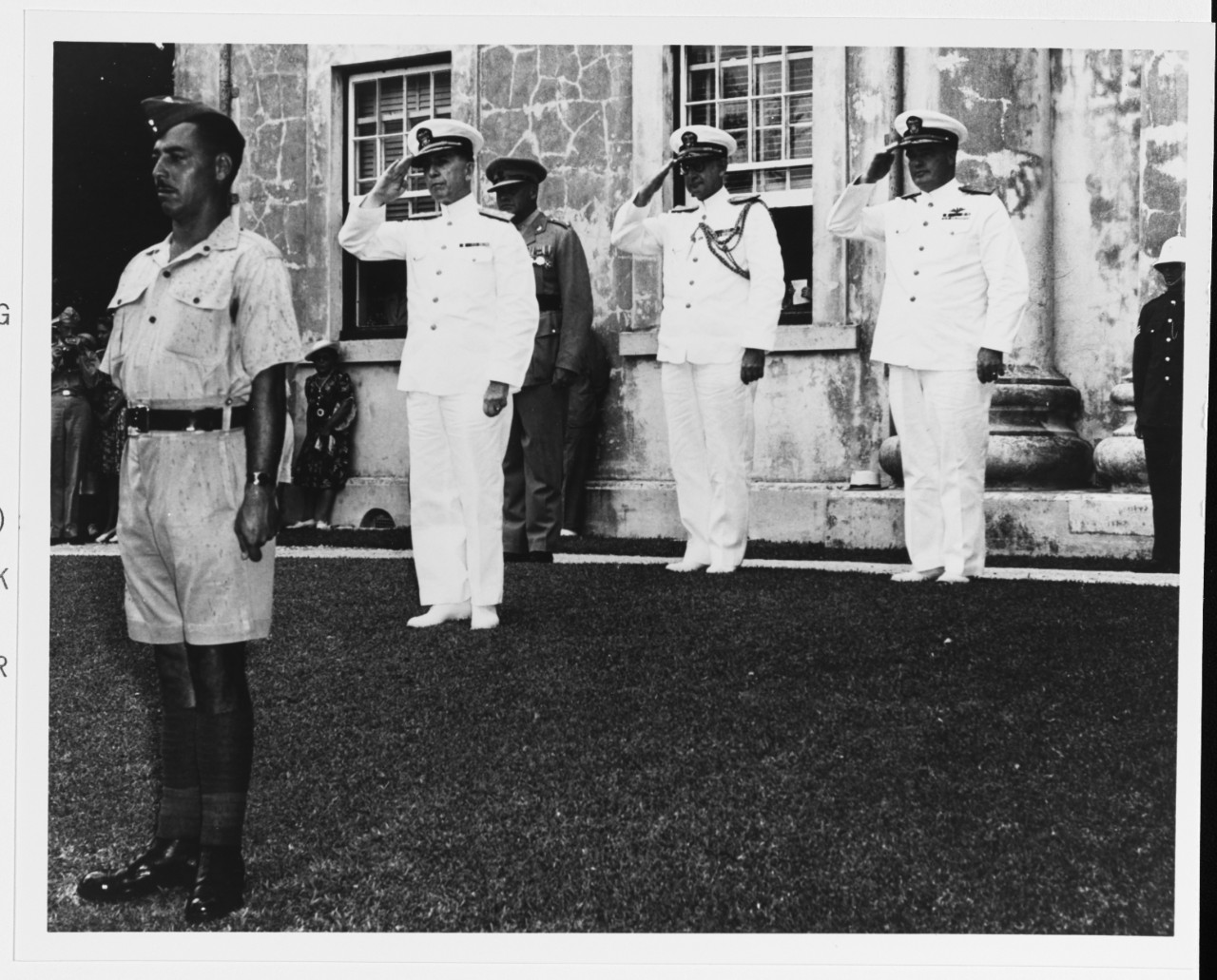
Sowell (extreme right) during the inspection of Admiral Royal E. Ingersoll at Bermuda in September 1944.

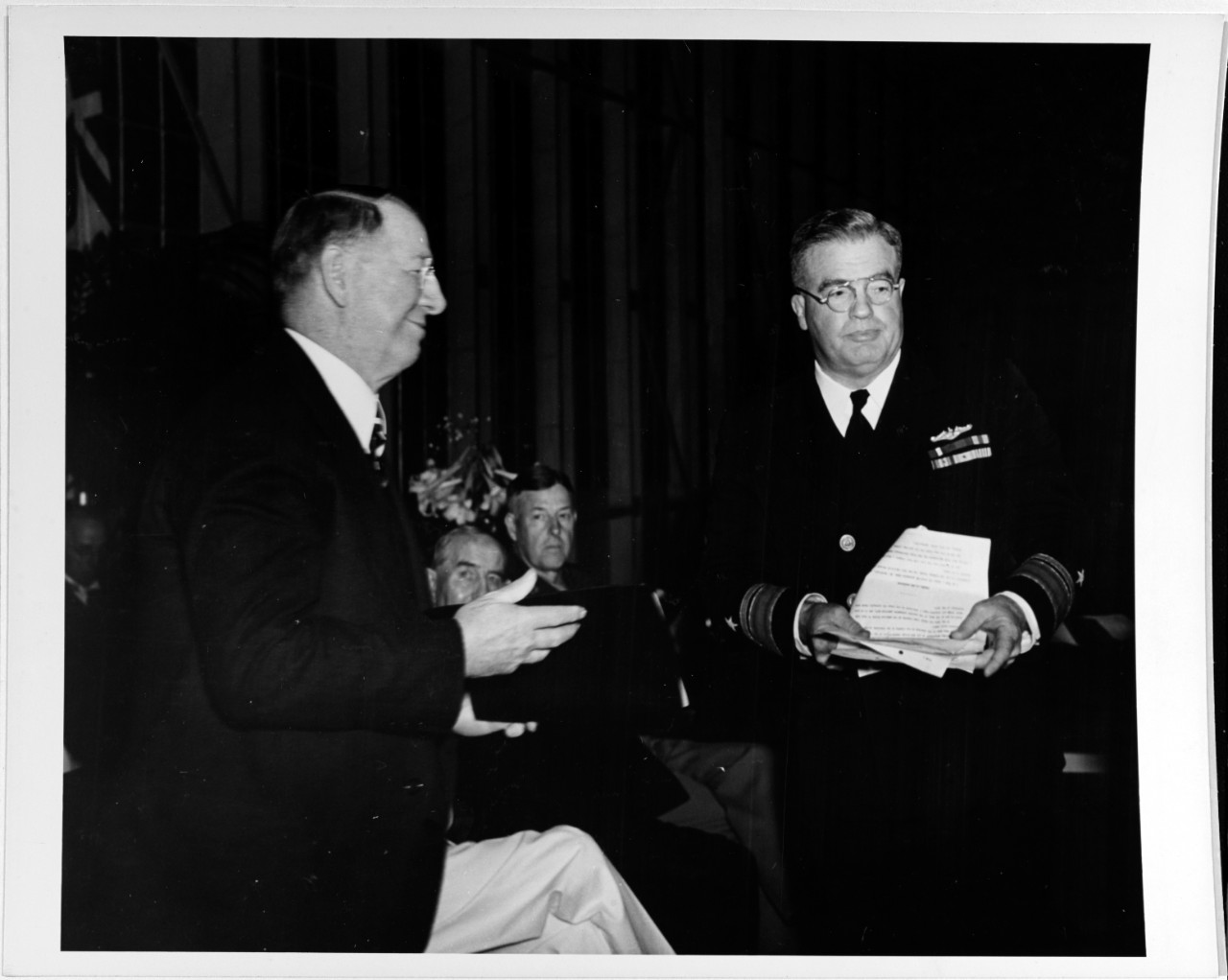
Sowell (right) and Secretary Frank Knox, attend the third anniversary celebration of the establishment of the U.S. naval base at Bermuda, British West Indies, April 6, 1944.

In January 1940, Sowell was appointed commanding officer of light cruiser USS Concord, which served as the part of Cruiser Division Three, Battle Force in the Pacific. Following the Japanese Attack on Pearl Harbor and United States entry into World War II, Concord took part in the escort convoy duties with the Southeast Pacific Force, escorting troops and supplies to Bora Bora in the Society Islands and then exercised in the Panama Canal Zone and patrolling along the coast of South America.

Sowell served with Concord until July 1942, when he was transferred to back to the States and assumed command of Farragut Naval Training Station, Idaho. He was responsible for the recruit training there until March 1943, when he was promoted to the rank of rear admiral and ordered to Bermuda, where he assumed duty as commander of Naval Operating Base there.

While in this capacity, he held additional duties as Task Group Commander in the Atlantic Fleet and as Deputy of the Commander-in-Chief, Atlantic Fleet under Admiral Royal E. Ingersoll. Sowell supervised the Fleet Base, maintained relations with civil and military authorities and conducted escort, salvage and rescue operations. He remained on Bermuda until September 1944, when he received orders for new command and was decorated with Legion of Merit for his service.

By the end of September 1944, Sowell was ordered back to States and after brief leave with family, he was sent to New York City, where assumed command of Battleship Division Five, which just arrived from Europe. His command consisted of old battleships Texas and Arkansas and after repairs and refit, he embarked for South Pacific. Sowell arrived to Pearl Harbor, Hawaii, on Christmas of 1944 and then proceeded further to South Pacific.

Sowell was transferred to command of Battleship Division Four on January 1, 1945, relieving Rear admiral Theodore D. Ruddock and flew his flag aboard battleship West Virginia. He led his division of battleships (West Virginia, Maryland and Colorado) during the Battle of Lingayen Gulf in early January 1945; and then conducted bombardment of enemy beach defenses prior and during the landings at Iwo Jima in February; and Okinawa in March and April 1945. Despite constant air attacks by kamikaze suicide planes against his ships and shelling by shore batteries, Sowell successfully commanded fire support group and conducted effective bombardment of enemy beach defenses. For his service in the Pacific, Sowell was decorated with Silver Star and second Legion of Merit with Combat "V".

He succeeded Rear Admiral John F. Shafroth Jr. in command of Battleship Division Eight in June 1945 and later participated in the naval operations near the coast of Kyushu, Japan. Following the surrender of Japan, Sowell participated in the surrender ceremony aboard battleship Missouri on September 2, 1945, in Tokyo Bay and then remained in the Japanese waters until the beginning of October 1945. He then led his division back to the United States, arriving to San Diego, California, on October 22, 1945.

== Death ==
Sowell's command was subsequently deactivated and he was ordered to Norfolk Navy Yard, Virginia, for duty as inspector general, Atlantic Fleet. While in this capacity, he served consecutively under Admirals Jonas H. Ingram, Marc Mitscher and William H. P. Blandy until early 1947, when he was diagnosed with cancer and ordered to the Brooklyn Naval Hospital for treatment. His health condition was getting worse and Sowell was transferred to the hospital in Long Beach, California.

Rear Admiral Ingram C. Sowell died there on December 21, 1947, aged 55, and was buried with military honors at Arlington National Cemetery, Virginia. His wife Frances Jack Sowell (1895-1986) is buried beside him. They had together three children: a son Ingram Jr., and two daughters Mary Ellen and Frances. The Ingram Sowell Elementary School in his native Lawrenceburg, Tennessee, was named in his honor.

== Awards and decorations ==
Here is the ribbon bar of Rear admiral Sowell:

Submarine Warfare insignia
1st Row	Navy Cross	Silver Star	Legion of Merit with Combat "V" and one 5/16" Gold Star
2nd Row	Nicaraguan Campaign Medal	Mexican Service Medal	World War I Victory Medal with Submarine Clasp
3rd Row	American Defense Service Medal with Fleet Clasp	American Campaign Medal	Asiatic–Pacific Campaign Medal with three bronze 3/16 inch service stars
4th Row	World War II Victory Medal	Navy Occupation Service Medal	Philippine Liberation Medal with one star

== See also ==
- USS Concord

Military offices
Preceded by Carleton F. Bryant	Commander, Battleship Division Five; October 1944 - January 1945	Succeeded by Peter K. Fischler
