= John F. Shafroth Jr. =

United States Navy admiral (1887–1967)

John Franklin Shafroth Jr.
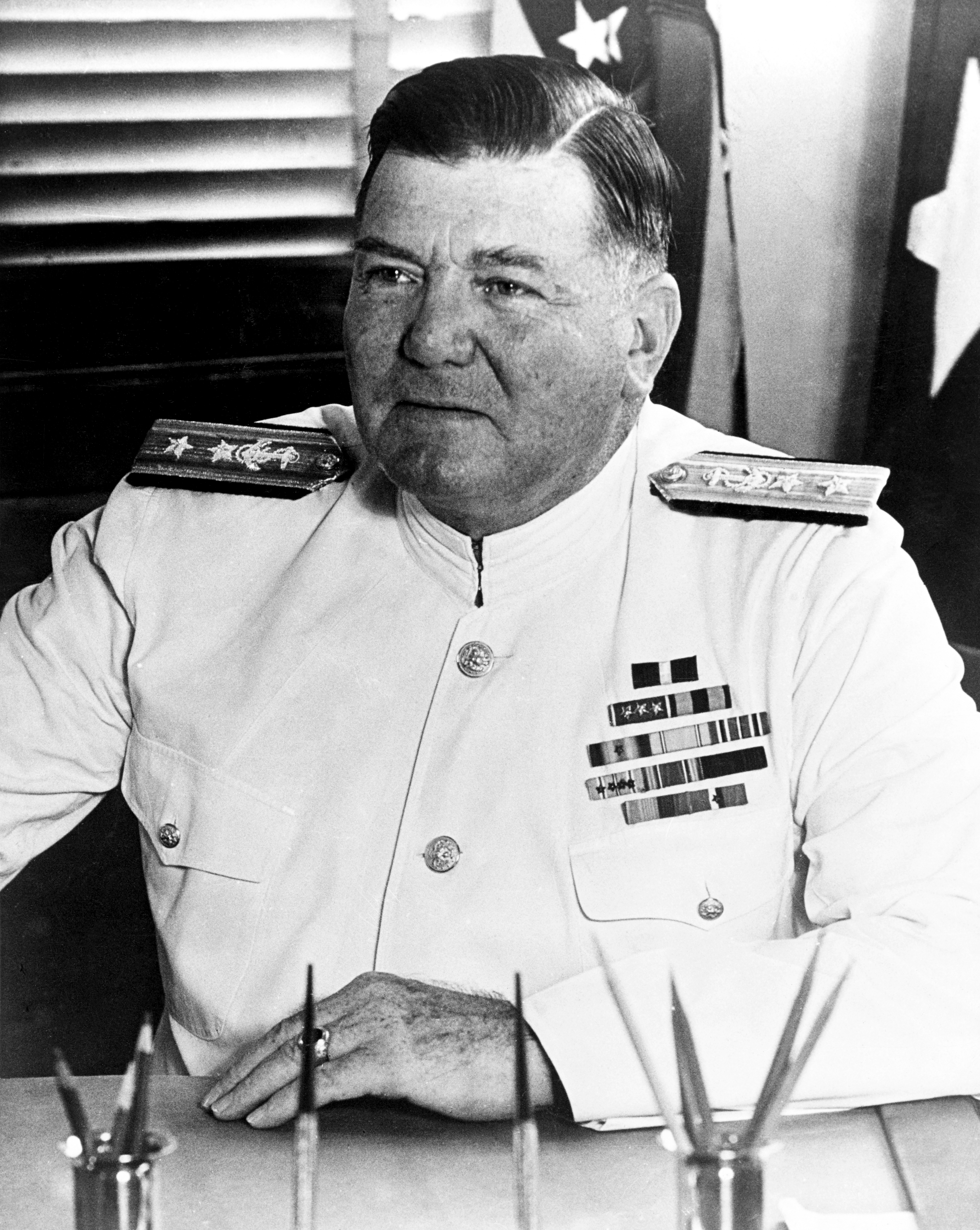
- VADM John F. Shafroth Jr., USN
- Born: March 31, 1887; Denver, Colorado, US
- Died: September 1, 1967 (aged 80); Westerly, Rhode Island, US
- Burial place: Arlington National Cemetery
- Relatives: John F. Shafroth (senator)
- Military career
- Allegiance: United States of America
- Branch: United States Navy
- Service years: 1908–1949
- Rank: Vice Admiral
- Nickname: Big Jack
- Commands: General Board of the Navy; Panama Sea Frontier; Seventh Naval district Southeast Pacific Area; Battleship Squadron 2 Battleship Division 8 Cruiser Division 3 USS Indianapolis
- Conflicts: Veracruz Expedition; World War I: Atlantic U-boat campaign; World War II: Solomon Islands campaign; Invasion of Lingayen Gulf; Battle of Iwo Jima; Battle of Okinawa; Bombardment of Japan
- Awards: Navy Cross; Legion of Merit (4)
- Other work: President, Naval Historical Foundation

John Franklin Shafroth Jr. (March 31, 1887 – September 1, 1967) was a highly decorated officer in the United States Navy with the rank of Vice Admiral. He distinguished himself as Commander of destroyer USS Terry during World War I and received the Navy Cross, the United States Navy second-highest decoration awarded for valor in combat.

Shafroth Jr. rose to the flag rank during World War II and commanded Southeast Pacific Area or Battleship Squadron 2 during Battle of Okinawa. He led the first naval bombardment of mainland Japan during the World War II, on July 14, 1945.

Following the War, Shafroth remained in the Navy and commanded Seventh Naval district, Panama Sea Frontier and General Board of the Navy. He served as President, Naval Historical Foundation from 1961 to 1967. He was the son of Senator and former Governor of Colorado, John F. Shafroth. Shafroth Jr. was nicknamed "Big Jack" due to his weight of 280 pounds.

== Early career ==
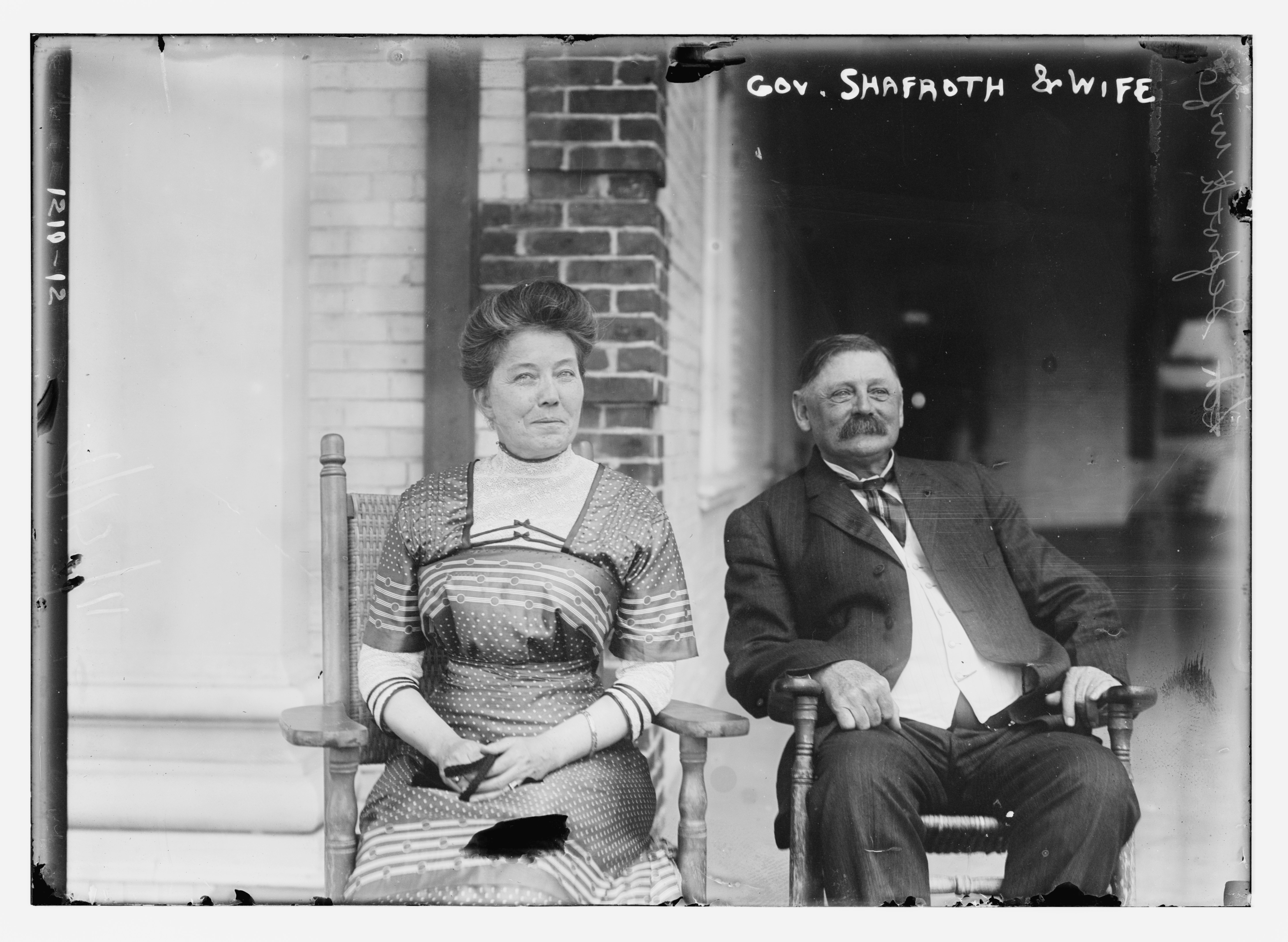
Shafroth's parents during his father's tenure as governor of Colorado

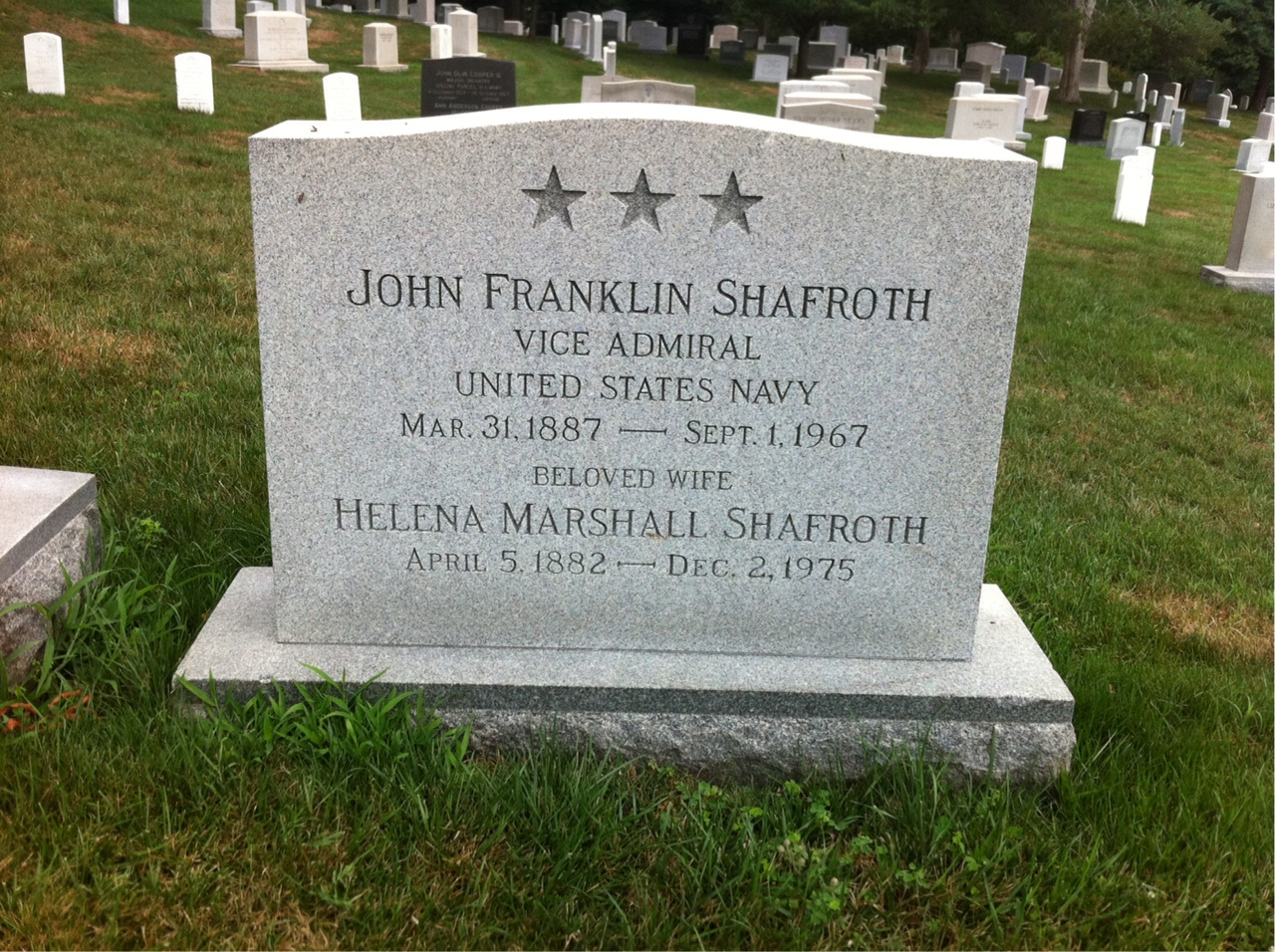
Grave at Arlington National Cemetery

John F. Shafroth Jr. was born March 31, 1887, in Denver, Colorado, a son of Colorado Senator and Governor John F. Shafroth and Virginia Morrison. He had four siblings, but only two reached adult age. His younger brother Morrison was a Colorado Democratic Candidate in 1924 United States Senate elections, but lost to Republican Rice W. Means, who later became Ku Klux Klan leader.

His youngest brother, Will, graduated from the University of Michigan and the University of California at Berkeley law school and became a lawyer. John Jr. did not followed his father's footsteps and after graduation from the Central High School in Washington, D.C., he earned an appointment to the United States Naval Academy at Annapolis, Maryland, in summer 1904.

While at the Academy, Shafroth was an universal athlete, becoming champion in heavyweight boxing and heavyweight wrestling; establishing high hurdle record while a member of the Track team; and also was active in the football team. He reached the rank of Cadet-Petty Officer 1st Class and was nicknamed "Shadrow" by his classmates.

Among his classmates were several future admirals including Harry A. Badt, John R. Beardall, Arthur S. Carpender, Jules James, James L. Kauffman, Thomas C. Kinkaid, Willis A. Lee Jr., William R. Munroe, William R. Purnell, Francis W. Rockwell and Richmond K. Turner.

He graduated with Bachelor of Science degree on June 15, 1908, and served as Passed Midshipman aboard the battleship USS Virginia during the cruise around the world with the Great White Fleet. While aboard Virginia, Shafroth visited Trinidad, Rio de Janeiro, Punta Arenas, Valparaíso, Hawaii, Melbourne, Sydney, Auckland, Manila, Yokohama, Singapore, Ceylon, Suez Canal, Port Said, and Gibraltar.

Shafroth then spent next three years aboard Virginia with training, participating in the Fleet Exercise in the Caribbean. He was commissioned Ensign on June 6, 1910, after serving two years at sea required then by law. Shafroth was promoted to Lieutenant (junior grade) on June 6, 1913, and served consecutively aboard destroyers USS Jouett, USS Beale, USS Jenkins. While aboard Jenkins, he served as ship's Executive officer under Lieutenant Frederick V. McNair and took part in the American occupation of Veracruz in April 1914.

== World War I ==
He was detached in September that year and ordered to the Bureau of Steam Engineering in Washington, D.C., where he served under Rear admiral Robert Stanislaus Griffin for next three years. While in this capacity, Shafroth was promoted to Lieutenant on August 29, 1916. Following the United States' entry into World War I in April 1917, Shafroth was promoted to the temporary rank of Lieutenant commander and assumed command of destroyer USS Terry at Charleston Navy Yard, South Carolina.

The Terry had just undergone extensive repairs and upon completion, she began patrolling along the Atlantic coast and escorting merchantmen bound for Europe. Shafroth commanded Terry within waters then infested with enemy submarines and mines and participated in escorting and protecting of important convoys of troops and supplies through these waters. For his service in this capacity, he was decorated with the Navy Cross, the United States Navy second-highest decoration awarded for valor in combat.

Shafroth was later transferred to command of Submarine Chaser Detachment 3 and was stationed in Berehaven, Ireland until December 1918, when he was ordered back to the United States.

== Interwar period ==
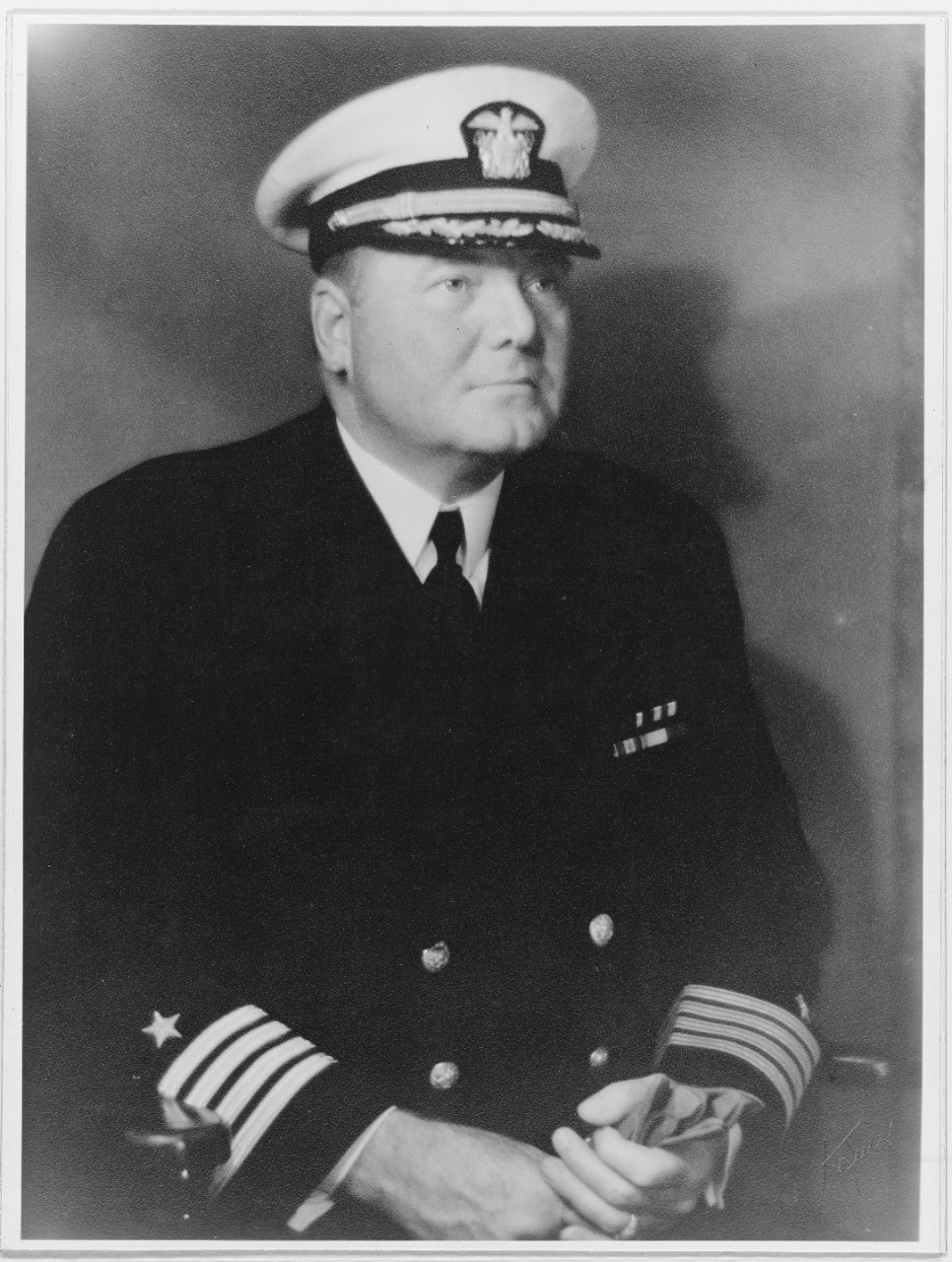
Shafroth as Captain, USN in 1936.

Upon his return, Shafroth served consecutively aboard destroyers Upshur, Waters, and Philip and participated in sea patrols off the Azores and in the Atlantic until March 1920, when he returned to the Bureau of Steam Engineering as Officer-in-Charge of the Fuel Division. In April 1922, he was appointed Aide and Flag Secretary on the staff of Commander, Special Service Squadron, which was then operating in the Caribbean under Rear admiral William C. Cole.

In June 1923, Shafroth was transferred to the staff of the United States Fleet and served as Aide and Flag Secretary to its Commander-in-Chief, Admiral Robert Coontz. He was ordered to the Naval War College in Newport, Rhode Island, in June 1925. He completed the senior course there in May of the following year. While at the college, Shafroth was promoted to Commander on November 16, 1925.

He was subsequently ordered for instruction to the Army War College in Washington, D.C., and upon graduation in June 1927, Shafroth served as a member of the faculty until June 1928. Shafroth was then ordered to the battleship USS Arkansas and served until May 1930 as ship's Navigator under Captain Hayne Ellis whilst the ship was patrolling the Panama Canal Zone and the Caribbean.

Shafroth was subsequently ordered to Washington, D.C., where he was assigned to the Bureau of Navigation (predecessor of the Bureau of Naval Personnel) and served there for next three years under Rear admiral Frank B. Upham. He was ordered for another tour of sea duty in June 1933, when he was appointed Executive officer aboard the battleship USS West Virginia under future Chief of Naval Operations, Captain Harold R. Stark.

When he finally got his own "sea command" in June 1935, Shafroth was ordered to the Naval Academy at Annapolis, where he was appointed commanding officer of USS Reina Mercedes, a former Spanish Navy unprotected cruiser captured in 1898 during Spanish–American War, a vessel now used as a receiving ship. While in this capacity, he was promoted to Captain on July 1, 1936.

In August 1938, Shafroth was given orders to assume command of the heavy cruiser Indianapolis, which was commissioned into service back in July 1931. He led his ship on various patrols in the Pacific until August 1940, when he was ordered back to the Bureau of Navigation in Washington, D.C., for duty as Director of the Naval Reserve Division. He reported to the Director of the Bureau, then-Rear admiral Chester Nimitz, and became his deputy in June 1941. While in this capacity, Shafroth befriended Nimitz and his family, which influenced Shafroth's later career.

== World War II ==
=== Panama and Hawaii ===
Following the Japanese attack on Pearl Harbor in December 1941, Shafroth was promoted to the temporary rank of Rear admiral and assumed temporary command of Cruiser Division 3 as substitute for his classmate, Abel T. Bidwell. His command consisted of the old cruisers Richmond and Trenton, and was originally designated as a Task Force for reinforcing of the garrison on Samoa. Before Shafroth could embark and lead his command to the South Pacific, he was replaced with the experienced Rear Admiral Frank J. Fletcher in early January 1942.

Shafroth was then appointed Commander, Southeast Pacific Area with headquarters in Balboa, Panama Canal Zone. The old cruisers Richmond and Trenton were meanwhile replaced with newer ships from their original mission and transferred to Shafroth's command. Shafroth also received a third cruiser, Concord, and several additional destroyers and auxiliary vessels. His area of responsibility extended from the Mexico-Guatemala border to the mid-Pacific near Clipperton Island and then southward to the South Pole.

Although his area of responsibility was huge and the force assigned to his command tiny, given the geographical area covered, it proved to be more than sufficient, due to a lack of Japanese activity. Shafroth focused on the escorting of convoys and helped transport 4,500 men to Bora Bora in French Polynesia and another 20,000 troops to New Caledonia as well as Kanton Island.

In December 1942, Shafroth was ordered to Hawaii and was attached to the headquarters of the Pacific Fleet under his old superior, now four-star Admiral Chester Nimitz, who appointed Shafroth to the role of Deputy Commander, South Pacific Area under Vice admiral William F. Halsey. While in this capacity, he was co-responsible for the administration of several subordinated commands, including South Pacific Amphibious Force; South Pacific Naval Forces; South Pacific Island Bases; South Pacific Aircraft command and South Pacific Service Squadron.

Shafroth remained in this capacity until March 1944, when he was appointed Inspector General, Pacific Fleet and Pacific Ocean areas under Nimitz. The posting was essentially non-combat duty and lasted until December 1944. While in this role, he served as a President of the Naval Board of Inquiry for the West Loch disaster in May 1944. For his service with Southeast Pacific Force; South Pacific Area and as Inspector General, Pacific Fleet, he was decorated with Legion of Merit.

=== Philippines, Okinawa and Japan ===
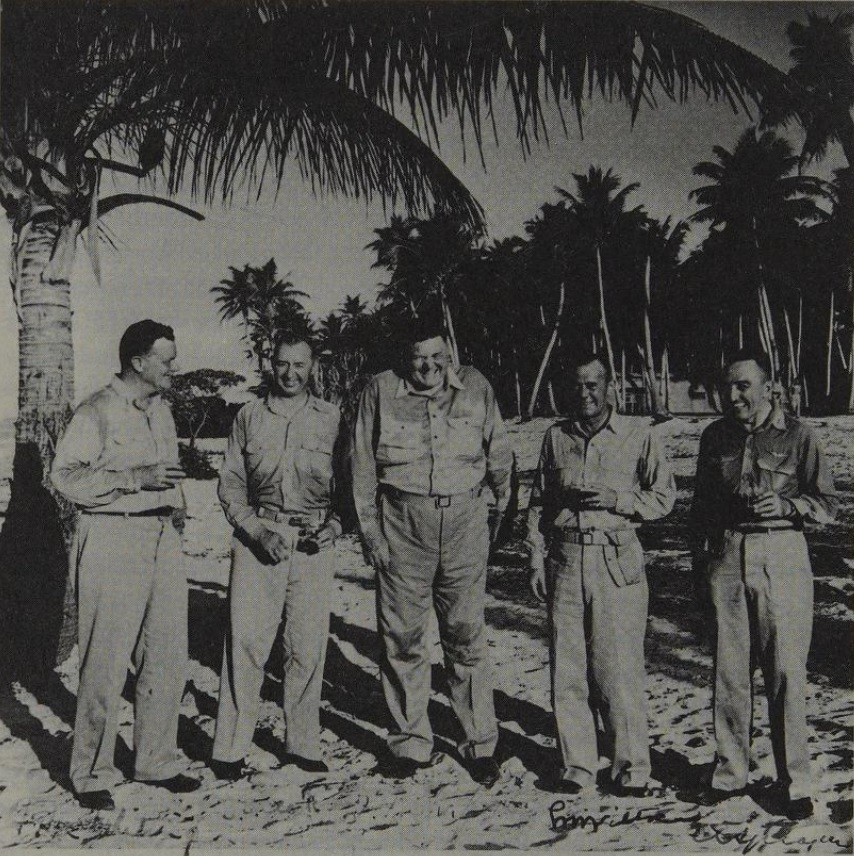
Admirals during Okinawa campaign on Ulithi Atoll in May 1945. Left to right: Whitting, Clark, Big Jack Shafroth, Wiltse, and Tommy Sprague.

On December 26, 1944, Shafroth was appointed Commander, Battleship Division 8 (BatDiv 8), built around the fast battleships Massachusetts and Alabama. His battleships then operated with the aircraft carriers of the Fast Carrier Task Force under Vice admiral Marc Mitscher, which made a series of raids on Formosa and Okinawa, to support the invasion of Lingayen Gulf in the northern Philippines.

Shafroth's Division was reorganized at the end of January 1945 and expanded to become the battleships Indiana, Massachusetts and South Dakota (his flagship). During the next four months, BatDiv 8 engaged in operations in support of amphibious operations at Iwo Jima in February that year; and conducted bombardment of the southeastern coast of Okinawa on March 24, 1945, the latter done in order to provide cover for minesweeping operations preparatory to the landing on Okinawa.

BatDiv 8 then provided cover for fast carrier operations against Tokyo, Kyushu, and in the Inland Sea area and destroyed 54 enemy planes by use of its anti-aircraft batteries. For his leadership of BatDiv 8 at Lingayen Gulf, Iwo Jima and Okinawa, Shafroth received his second Legion of Merit.

Shafroth was appointed Commander of Task Unit 34.8.1 of the Third Fleet under Admiral William F. Halsey on July 14, 1945. His command consisted of the battleships USS South Dakota, Indiana and Massachusetts, the heavy cruisers USS Quincy and Chicago, along with nine destroyers. He was tasked to attack the ironworks at Kamaishi in northern Honshu. At the time the city had a population of 40,000 and the ironworks was among the largest in Japan. However, due to shortages of coking coal and other raw materials, the ironworks was running at less than half its capacity. It was the first naval bombardment of mainland Japan during World War II.

A few nights later Shafroth led his command during another bombardment, this time on the city of Hamamatsu. Industrial and railroad targets were destroyed, inflicting heavy damage on the enemy, without any casualties to the U.S. and British warships present. For his leadership of the Task Unit during these bombardments of Japan, Shafroth received his third and fourth Legion of Merit.

== Postwar service ==
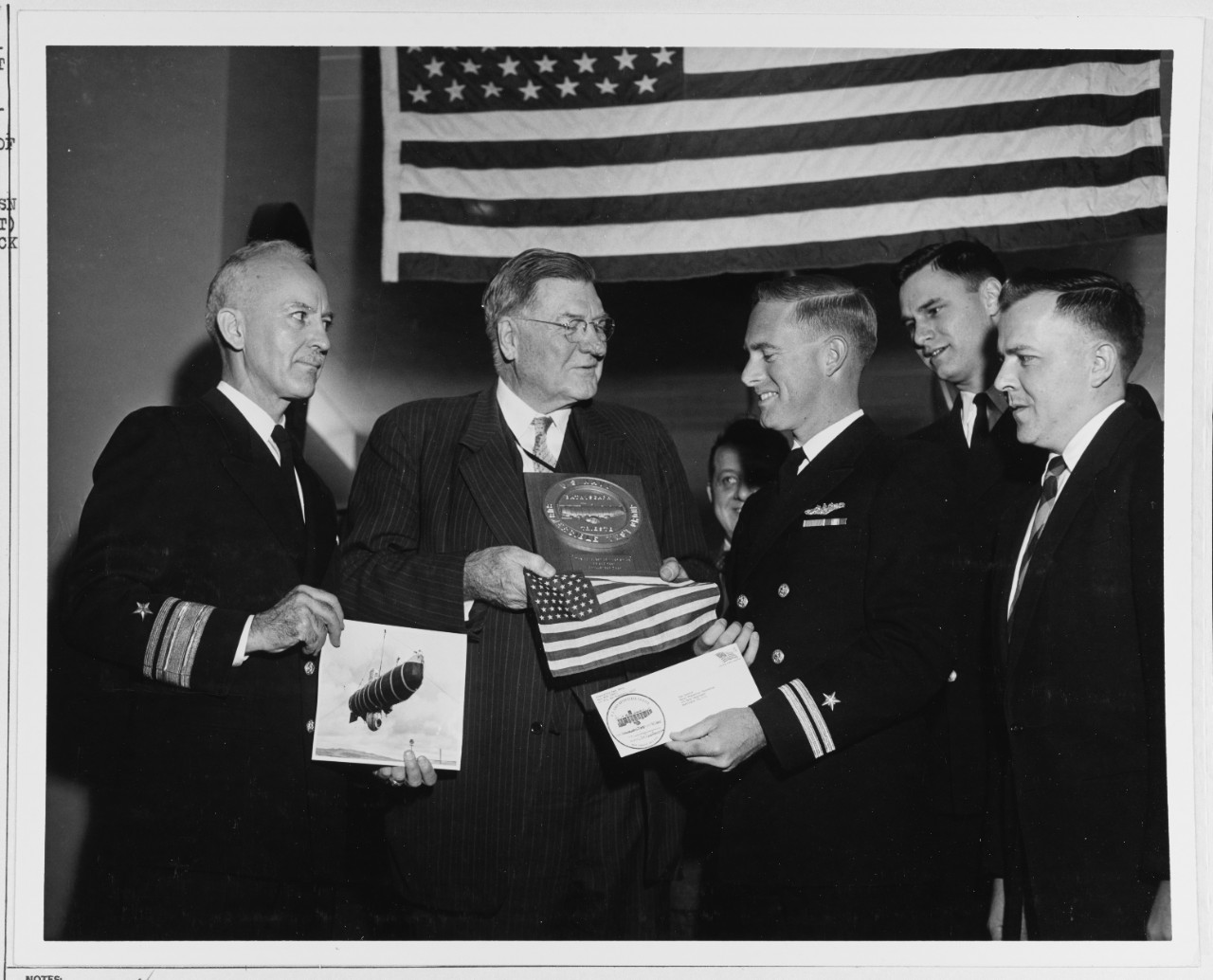
Shafroth (center in civilian clothes) receives gifts on behalf of Naval Historical Foundation in January 1960.

Upon the Surrender of Japan, Shafroth participated in the surrender ceremony aboard battleship Missouri in Tokyo Bay on September 2, 1945, and returned to the United States in December that year. He was subsequently ordered to Miami, Florida, where he assumed duty as Seventh Naval district with additional duty as Commander, Gulf Sea Frontier.

Shafroth served in this capacity until the beginning of July 1946, when he was transferred to Balboa, Panama Canal Zone, where he had served in 1942 and assumed duty as Commandant, Fifteenth Naval district with additional duty as Commander, Panama Sea Frontier. For his wartime and postwar service in Panama, Shafroth was decorated by the governments of Colombia, Ecuador, Panama, and Peru.

In April 1948, Shafroth returned to the United States and assumed duty as Chairman of the General Board of the Navy at the Navy Department. He remained in this assignment until his transfer to the Retired list of the Navy on April 1, 1949, after 40 years of service. Shafroth was advanced to the rank of Vice Admiral on the retired list for having been specially commended in combat.

== Retirement ==
Following his retirement from the Navy, Shafroth resided in Washington, D.C., and was active in the Naval Historical Foundation. He was elected President of the Foundation in 1961 and remained in that assignment until his death from a stroke on September 1, 1967, aged 80. Vice admiral John F. Shafroth Jr. was buried with full military honors at Arlington National Cemetery, Virginia, together with his wife, Helena Marshall Fischer (1882–1975). They had one daughter.

== Decorations ==
Here is the ribbon bar of Vice Admiral Shafroth:

1st Row	Navy Cross		Legion of Merit with three 5/16" Gold Stars
2nd Row	Mexican Service Medal	World War I Victory Medal with Destroyer Clasp	American Defense Service Medal
3rd Row	American Campaign Medal	Asiatic–Pacific Campaign Medal with four 3/16 inch service stars	World War II Victory Medal
4th Row	Philippine Liberation Medal with one star	Grand Officer of Order of the Sun of Peru	Grand Officer of the Military Order of Ayacucho (Peru)
5th Row	Order of Abdon Calderón, 1st Class (Ecuador)	Grand Cross of the Order of Boyaca (Colombia)	Grand Cross of the Order of Vasco Núñez de Balboa (Panama)

== See also ==
- Jones–Shafroth Act

Military offices
Preceded by John R. Beardall	Commandant, Fifteenth Naval district July 1, 1946 – April 27, 1948	Succeeded by Edward Hanson
Preceded by Walter S. Anderson	Commandant, Seventh Naval district December 1, 1945 – July 1, 1946	Succeeded by Ralph E. Davison
Preceded by Glenn B. Davis	Commander, Battleship Division Eight; December 1944 – June 1945	Succeeded by Ingram C. Sowell
Preceded by Abel T. Bidwell	Commander, Southeast Pacific Area; January 6, 1942 – December 25, 1942	Succeeded by Francis E. M. Whiting
