= Panama Sea Frontier =

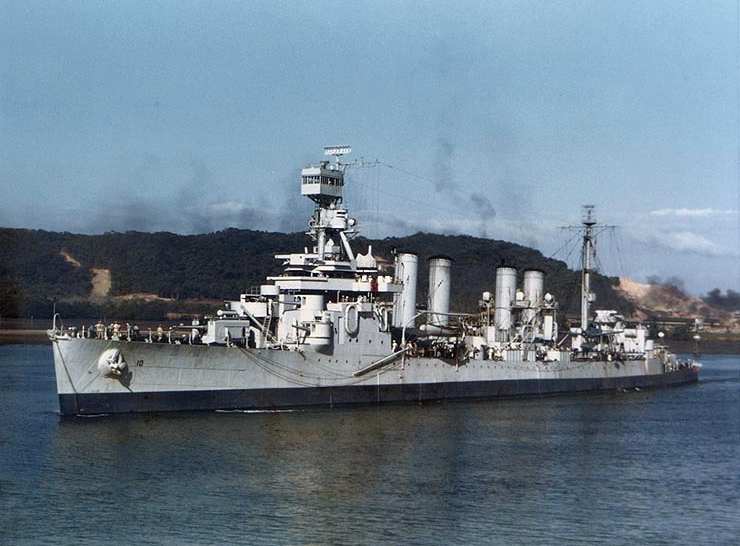
The light cruiser USS Concord off Balboa, Panama, on January 6, 1943

The Panama Sea Frontier was a U.S. Navy command responsible during and shortly after World War II for the defense of the Pacific and Atlantic sea approaches to the Panama Canal and naval shore facilities in the Central America region. The Sea Frontier headquarters were located in Balboa, Panama.

On the west coast of the Americas, the responsibility of the Panama Sea Frontier was to protect Allied shipping in an ocean area extending from the Mexico-Guatemala border and out around the Galapagos, then to latitude 5 degree south. On the eastern side of Panama, the sea frontier was responsible for the coastal areas from the Mexico-British Honduras boundary on the Yucatán Peninsula along latitude 18 degrees 5 minutes north to longitude 80 degrees 27 minutes west, and thence to Punta de Gallinas. However, the prime responsibility of this sea frontier was the protection and defense of the Panama Canal and its operating equipment.

The Panama Sea Frontier also had to contend with political as well as military forces, since the president of Panama, Arnulfo Arias, had pro-German leanings, and also because neutral Panama, like neutral Spain in Europe, was a haven for Axis agents, sympathizers, and spies. Anulfo Arias was replaced as president with the pro-Allied Ricardo Adolfo de la Guardia Arango, shortly before America was attacked at Pearl Harbor. However, pro-Axis sympathy continued for the followers of Anulfo Arias, and others, and German influence continued to be very strong in the region.

== Commanders ==
- Rear Admiral Frank H. Sadler: 7 December 1941 - 15 April 1942
- Rear Admiral Clifford E. Van Hook: 15 April 1942 - 14 October 1943
- Rear Admiral Harold C. Train: 14 October 1943 - 10 June 1944
- Captain Ellis S. Stone (Acting): 11 June 1944 - 3 November 1944
- Rear Admiral Howard F. Kingman: 3 November 1944 - 9 July 1945
- Captain Schuyler Mills (Acting): 9 July 1945 - 23 August 1945
- Rear Admiral John R. Beardall: 23 August 1945 - 27 June 1946
- Rear Admiral John F. Shafroth Jr.: 27 June 1946 - April 27, 1948.

== See also ==
- Panama Conference (1939)
- American Theater (1939-1945)
- Motor Torpedo Boat Squadron Two
