= Allied naval bombardments of Japan =

Allied naval bombardments of Japan may refer to:

- Allied naval bombardments of Japan during World War II (1945) by the United States, United Kingdom and New Zealand
- Shimonoseki campaign (1863–1864) by the United Kingdom, France, the Netherlands and the United States
