= Glenn B. Davis =

United States Navy admiral

Glenn Benson Davis
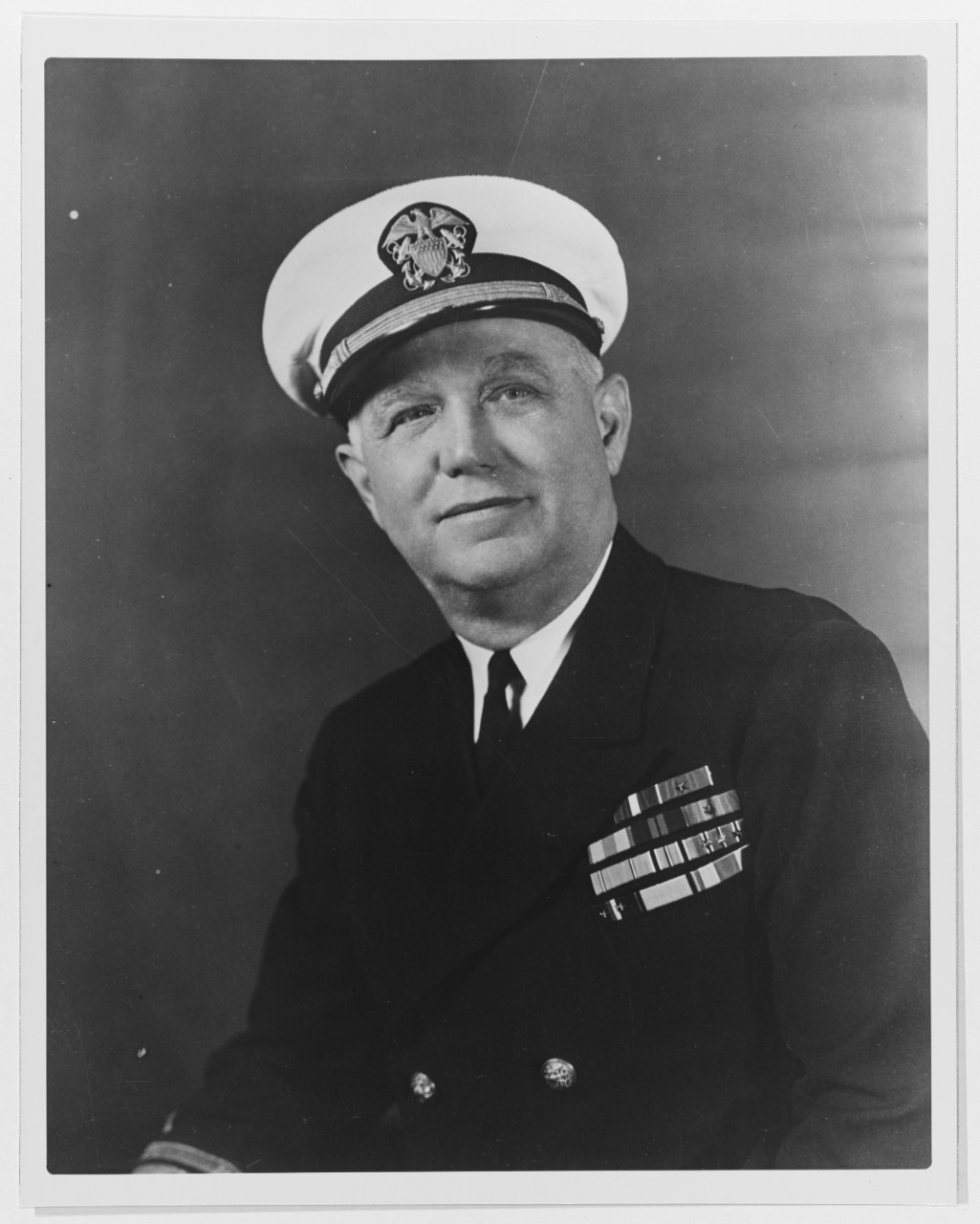
- VADM Glenn B. Davis, USN
- Born: January 2, 1892; Norwalk, Ohio, US
- Died: September 9, 1984 (aged 92); Hilton Head Island, South Carolina, US
- Burial place: Arlington National Cemetery
- Military career
- Allegiance: United States of America
- Branch: United States Navy
- Service years: 1913–1953
- Rank: Vice Admiral
- Commands: Sixth Naval district Potomac River Naval Command; Washington Navy Yard; Battleship Division 8 USS Washington
- Conflicts: Veracruz Expedition; World War I World War II: Naval Battle of Guadalcanal; Battle of Tarawa; Battle of Saipan; Battle of Tinian; Recapture of Guam; Battle of Leyte
- Awards: Navy Cross; Legion of Merit (2)

Glenn Benson Davis (January 2, 1892 – September 9, 1984) was a highly decorated officer in the United States Navy with the rank of Vice Admiral. He distinguished himself as Commanding officer of battleship USS Washington during the Naval Battle of Guadalcanal in November 1942, when Washington sank the Japanese battleship Kirishima.

Davis was subsequently promoted to Rear admiral and commanded Battleship Division 8 during the Mariana Islands campaign in summer 1944. He remained in the Navy following the War and completed his service as Commandant, Sixth Naval district in Charleston, South Carolina.

== Early years ==
Glenn Benson Davis Sr. was born on January 2, 1892, in Norwalk, Ohio, the son of Albert W. and Emma Benson Davis. He graduated from the Norwalk High School in May 1909 and received an appointment to the United States Naval Academy at Annapolis, Maryland in July that year. While at the academy, Davis reached the rank of cadet-lieutenant in charge of Cadet Company and served as manager of the basketball team. He was nicknamed "G.B" and "Dave" by his classmates.

Among his classmates were several future flag officers, including four-star admirals William H. P. Blandy, Laurance T. DuBose, and John L. Hall Jr.; Vice admirals Paul Hendren, Arthur G. Robinson, Leo H. Thebaud; and Rear admirals Frederick G. Crisp, Norman C. Gillette and Paulus P. Powell.

Davis graduated with a Bachelor of Science degree and was commissioned an Ensign on June 7, 1913. He was subsequently attached to the battleship USS Kansas and cruised the east coast for the next several months. Davis took part in the patrols in the Gulf of Mexico during the Veracruz Expedition in summer 1914 and then participated in another series of patrols in the Caribbean, protecting life and property during a revolution in Haiti in late 1915.

He was later transferred to the battleship USS Kentucky and patrolled along the east coast and in the Caribbean and was promoted to Lieutenant (junior grade) on June 7, 1916. Following the United States' entry into World War I in April 1917, Davis was assigned to the tanker USS Maumee and embarked for Britain to fuel allied ships. He was stationed about 300 miles south of Greenland and was promoted successively to the temporary ranks of Lieutenant and Lieutenant commander.

== Interwar period ==
Following the War, Davis reverted to the permanent rank of Lieutenant, but his temporary rank of Lieutenant commander was extended one month later, and he was sent to the Bureau of Ordnance in September 1919 and then to the Naval Postgraduate School. He graduated from the postgraduate course in ordnance in December 1920 and was ordered for additional instruction to the Midvale Steel in Philadelphia.

In July 1921, Davis was assigned to the battleship USS Tennessee and served with her within the Pacific Fleet until October 1924, when he was ordered to the Naval Proving Ground Dahlgren, Virginia as Experimental officer under Captain Andrew C. Pickens. Davis was promoted to the permanent rank of Lieutenant commander on June 8, 1923.

He later served at Dahlgren Ground in the same capacity under then-Captain and future CNO, Harold R. Stark and completed a course in chemical warfare. Davis later became known in the Navy as an Ordnance expert due to his service at Dahlgren. He was transferred to battleship USS Wyoming in June 1927 and took part in her extensive modernization at Philadelphia Navy Yard. After the completion of the works in November that year, Davis sailed with Wyoming to the Caribbean, where they patrolled off the coast of Cuba and the Virgin Islands.

Davis was ordered back to the Bureau of Ordnance in July 1930, and after a two-year duty there, he was appointed commanding officer of destroyer USS Blakeley and participated in the naval operations and exercises with the Scouting Fleet in the Atlantic until March 1934. While in this capacity, he was promoted to Commander on September 1, 1933. He was subsequently ordered back to Naval Proving Ground Dahlgren, Virginia and served as executive officer under Captain William R. Furlong until June 1937, when he was ordered to Philadelphia Navy Yard for duty in connection with fitting out of light cruiser USS Philadelphia. Upon the commissioning of the ship in January 1938, Davis was appointed her executive officer under Captain Jules James and took part in the shakedown cruise in the West Indies followed by additional alterations at Philadelphia and further sea trials off the Maine coast. During the official visits to Haiti and the Dominican Republic, Davis was decorated by those countries.

Davis returned to the Bureau of Ordnance in June 1939 and was appointed assistant to Chief of Bureau, now Rear Admiral William R. Furlong. Davis served as Furlong's deputy at Naval Proving Ground Dahlgren in 1936–1937. He was promoted to Captain on May 1, 1940.

== World War II ==
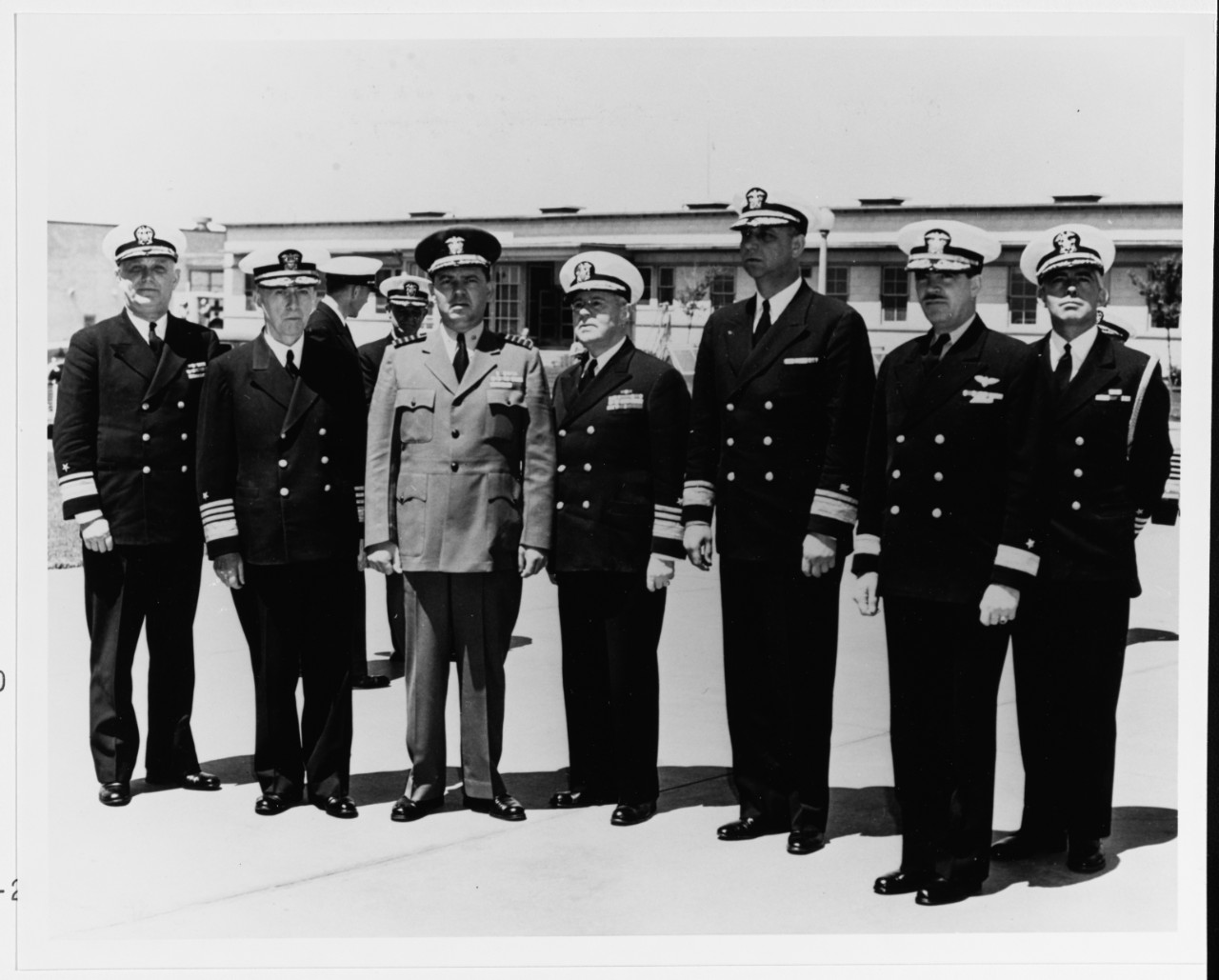
Davis (extreme left) as Deputy Commander and Chief of Staff to Admiral Royal E. Ingersoll, Commander, Western Sea Frontier (second from left) during inspection at Naval Supply Depot, Clearfield, Utah in June 1945. Among them is also Vice Admiral John W. Greenslade (center).

Following the Japanese attack on Pearl Harbor and the United States' entry into World War II, Davis still served with the Bureau of Ordnance in Washington, D.C., now under his classmate, Rear Admiral William H. P. Blandy. He was given sea command of the battleship USS Washington by the end of July 1942 and led the flagship of Commander, Battleship Division 6, Rear Admiral Willis A. Lee to the Southwest Pacific. The Washington was engaged in the covering of convoy operations that brought supplies and reinforcements to the marines fighting on Guadalcanal into early November 1942. On the night of November 14–15, 1942, Davis led Washington into a bitter fight off Savo Island together with the battleship USS South Dakota. The South Dakota was damaged in the battle, but Washington returned fire and fatally crippled the battleship Kirishima, which ultimately capsized and sank. For his leadership of Washington in the battle, Davis was decorated with the Navy Cross, the United States Navy's second-highest decoration awarded for valor in combat.

Davis commanded Washington until April 1943, when he was promoted to the temporary rank of Rear Admiral and assumed command of newly activated Battleship Division 8 (BatDiv 8), built around the battleships Indiana, Massachusetts, North Carolina, and South Dakota. He led his force during the Isolation of Rabaul, New Britain during the summer of 1943, and after a brief stop at Pearl Harbor, Hawaii, Davis returned with BatDiv 8 to the Southwest Pacific area.

In November 1943, BatDiv 8 participated in the assaults on Tarawa, Makin and Abemama in the Gilberts, and covered the aircraft carriers while they raided the islands. Davis then commanded BatDiv 8 during the Mariana Islands campaign at Saipan, Tinian and Guam in June–August 1944 and received the Legion of Merit for his service. He continued in the command of his division during the Invasion of Leyte, Philippines in late 1944 and was decorated with a second Legion of Merit.

Davis was succeeded by Rear Admiral John F. Shafroth Jr. in December 1944 and prepared for return to the United States, but Typhoon Cobra changed his plans. Admiral William F. Halsey unwittingly sailed the Third Fleet into the center of the typhoon, and due to 100 mph (87 kn; 45 m/s; 160 km/h) winds, high seas, and torrential rain, three destroyers capsized and sank, with 790 lives lost. Nine other warships were damaged, and over 100 aircraft were wrecked or washed overboard.

The Navy Department ordered Halsey to be court-martialed and Commander-in-Chief, Pacific Fleet, Fleet Admiral Chester Nimitz appointed a three-man court of inquiry with Vice Admiral John H. Hoover as the president of the court, and Davis and Vice Admiral George D. Murray as associate judges. Hoover, Davis, and Murray ultimately recommended Halsey face court-martial for sailing the Third Fleet into a typhoon, but the court's recommendation was ignored by the Chief of Naval Operations Ernest J. King and President Franklin D. Roosevelt, who likely felt Halsey was too much of a popular hero to be subjected to public rebuke.

Davis then returned to the United States and assumed duty as Deputy Commander and Chief of Staff, Western Sea Frontier, headquartered in San Francisco under Admiral Royal E. Ingersoll. He served in this capacity for the rest of the War.

== Postwar service ==
Following the War, Davis remained in San Francisco until the end of January 1946, when he was appointed Commandant of the Washington Navy Yard with additional duties as Superintendent of the Naval Gun Factory and Commandant, Potomac River Naval Command. Upon the reorganization of that command in July 1946, Davis remained in command of Potomac River Command, which was subordinated directly to the Chief of Naval Operations, Chester Nimitz and consisted of Washington Navy Yard, Naval Air Stations Anacostia and Patuxent River; Naval Gun Factory, Naval Proving Ground Indian Head, Naval Academy, Naval Research Laboratory, Naval Observatory, and Bethesda Naval Hospital.

Davis remained in that command until July 1951, when he was ordered to Charleston Navy Yard for duty as Commandant, Sixth Naval district. While in this capacity, he was responsible for the defense of the coast of South Carolina, Georgia, and North Carolina, and Navy installations in these states. Davis retired from active duty on July 1, 1953, after 40 years of service and was advanced to the rank of vice admiral on the retired list for having been specially commended in combat.

== Retirement and death ==
Upon his retirement from the Navy, Davis assumed duty as president of the Isthmian Steamship Company, a shipping company headquartered in New York City. During his tenure, the company was sold to States Marine Lines in 1956, and Davis later served as a chairman of the board of Isthmian Lines Inc. He retired from that company in 1958 and settled in Hilton Head Island, South Carolina.

Vice Admiral Glenn B. Davis died there on September 9, 1984, aged 92, and was buried with full military honors at Arlington National Cemetery, Virginia. His wife, Ruth Manahan Davis, sister of Commodore Stewart A. Manahan, is buried beside him. They had one son, Glenn B. Davis, Jr.

== Decorations ==
Here is the ribbon bar of Vice Admiral Davis:

1st Row	Navy Cross		
2nd Row	Legion of Merit with Combat "V" and one 5/16" Gold Star	Mexican Service Medal	Haitian Campaign Medal
3rd Row	World War I Victory Medal with Fleet Clasp	American Defense Service Medal	American Campaign Medal
4th Row	Asiatic–Pacific Campaign Medal with one silver and two bronze 3/16 inch service stars	World War II Victory Medal	National Defense Service Medal
5th Row	Philippine Liberation Medal with two stars	National Order of Honour and Merit, Commander (Haiti)	Order of Juan Pablo Duarte, Commander (Dominican Republic)

Military offices
Preceded by Robert W. Hayler	Commandant, Sixth Naval district July 1, 1951 – July 1, 1953	Succeeded by Heber H. McLean
Preceded by Ferdinand L. Reichmuth	Commandant, Potomac River Naval Command; January 28, 1946 – July 1, 1951	Succeeded by George H. Fort
Preceded by Ferdinand L. Reichmuth	Commandant, Washington Navy Yard; January 28, 1946 – July 1, 1946	Succeeded by Theodore D. Ruddock
Preceded by Aaron S. Merrill	Commander, Battleship Division Eight; April 1943 – December 1944	Succeeded by John F. Shafroth Jr.
