= Southeast Pacific Area =

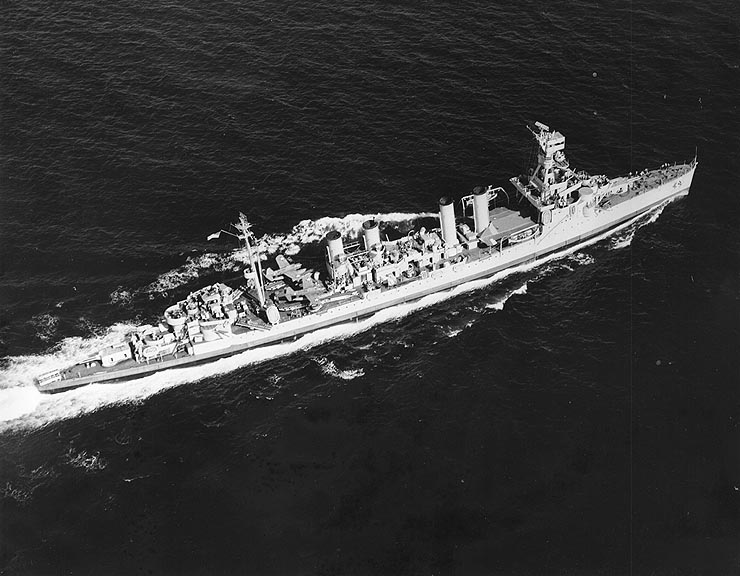
- USS Trenton in the Gulf of Panama in May 1943
- Founded: December 8, 1941
- Disbanded: September 2, 1945
- Country: United States
- Part of: Asiatic-Pacific Theater
- Garrison/HQ: Balboa, Panama
- Nickname: SoEastPac
- Engagements: Pacific War

Commanders
- Notable commanders: Abel T. Bidwell; John F. Shafroth Jr.; Francis E. M. Whiting; Harold C. Train; Ellis S. Stone; Howard F. Kingman; Schuyler Mills; John R. Beardall

The Southeast Pacific Area was one of the designated area commands created by the Combined Chiefs of Staff in the Pacific region during World War II. It was responsible to the Joint Chiefs of Staff via the Commander-in-Chief of the United States Navy (COMINCH), Admiral Ernest King. Rear Admiral Abel T. Bidwell, former commander of Cruiser Division Three, commanded the Southeast Pacific Area during the first months of the war.

== History ==
On 24 March 1942, the newly formed British and Combined Chiefs of Staff issued a directive designating the Pacific theater an area of American strategic responsibility. Six days later the Joint Chiefs of Staff (JCS) divided the Pacific theater into three areas: the Pacific Ocean Areas (POA), the Southwest Pacific Area (SWPA), and the Southeast Pacific Area.

The Southeast Pacific Force, SoEastPac, was a small force of cruisers and destroyers based at Balboa, Panama which formed the main force operating in the Southeast Pacific Area. The Southeast Pacific Force was formed by a directive of 28 August 1941 to Admiral Husband Kimmel:

CINCPAC CONSTITUTE THE SOUTHEAST PACIFIC FORCE CONSISTING OF TWO 7,500-TON LIGHT CRUISERS AND DISPATCH IT TO BALBOA. FOR TASK PURPOSES THIS FORCE WILL OPERATE DIRECTLY UNDER CNO AFTER ENTERING THE SOUTHEAST PACIFIC SUB AREA AS DEFINED IN WPL 46 PAR. 3222 EXCEPT WESTERN LIMIT IS LONGITUDE 100 WEST. WITHIN THE PACIFIC SECTOR OF THE PANAMA NAVAL COASTAL FRONTIER AND WITHIN THE SOUTHEAST PACIFIC SUB AREA THE COMMANDER PANAMA NAVAL COASTAL FRONTIER AND COMMANDER SOUTHEAST PACIFIC FORCE WILL IN COOPERATION AND ACTING UNDER THE STRATEGIC DIRECTION OF THE CHIEF OF NAVAL OPERATIONS EXECUTE THE FOLLOWING TASK: DESTROY SURFACE RAIDERS WHICH ATTACK OR THREATEN UNITED STATES FLAG SHIPPING.

Amongst ships assigned to the Southeast Pacific Force were the light cruisers USS Concord, USS Trenton, USS Detroit, and the destroyers USS Warrington and USS McDougal.

== Commanders ==
The Official Chronology of the U.S. Navy in World War II dates the establishment of the Southeast Pacific Area to 8 December 1941.

- Rear Admiral Abel T. Bidwell: 8 December 1941 – 6 January 1942
- Rear Admiral John F. Shafroth Jr.: 6 January 1942 – 25 December 1942
- Rear Admiral Francis E. M. Whiting: 25 December 1942 – 12 October 1943
- Rear Admiral Harold C. Train: 12 October 1943 – 8 June 1944
- Captain Ellis S. Stone (A): 8 June 1944 – 3 November 1944
- Rear Admiral Howard F. Kingman: 3 November 1944 – 9 July 1945
- Captain Schuyler Mills (A): 9 July 1945 – 23 August 1945
- Rear Admiral John R. Beardall: 23 August 1945 – 2 September 1945

== See also ==
- Panama during World War II
