= Allied naval bombardments of Japan during World War II =

Naval attacks on Japan by the Allies during the Pacific War

Allied naval bombardments of Japan
- Part of the Japan campaign, Pacific War
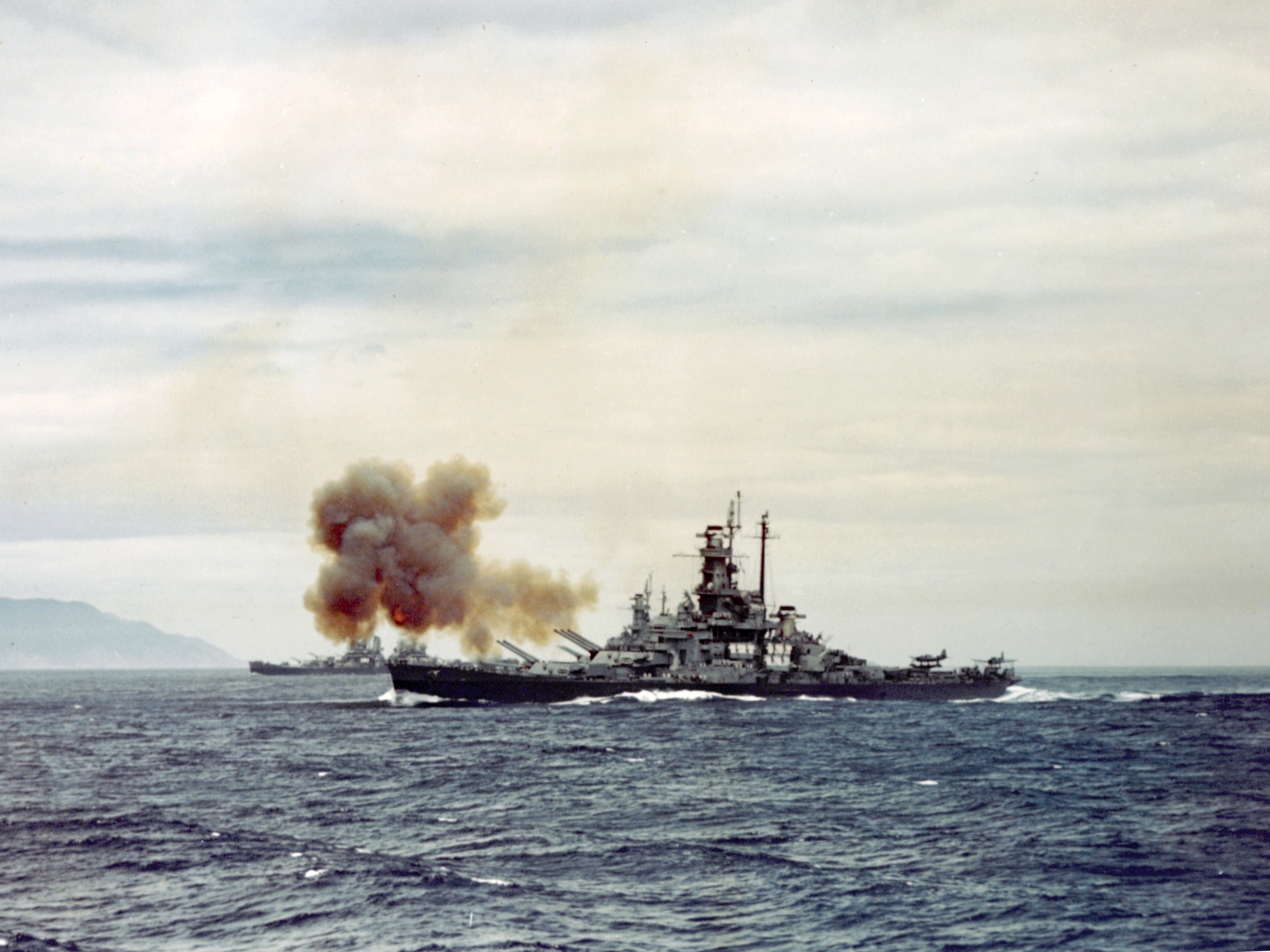
- USS Indiana bombarding Kamaishi, Japan on 14 July 1945
Date	July–August 1945
Location	Four Japanese cities and several military facilities and towns
Result	Allied victory

Belligerents
United States; United Kingdom; New Zealand	Japan

Casualties and losses
32 (POWs killed in the bombardments of Kamaishi)	Up to 1,739 killed Up to 1,497 wounded Damage to industrial facilities Damage to urban areas

During the last weeks of the Pacific War in 1945, warships of the United States Navy, the Royal Navy and the Royal New Zealand Navy bombarded industrial and military facilities in Japan. Most of these bombardments were conducted by battleships and cruisers, and caused heavy damage to several of the targeted factories, as well as nearby civilian areas. A major goal of the attacks was to provoke the Japanese military into committing some of its reserve force of aircraft into battle. However, the Japanese did not attempt to attack the Allied bombardment forces, and none of the involved warships suffered any damage.

The major bombardments began on 14 and 15 July 1945, when US Navy warships attacked the cities of Kamaishi and Muroran. The next attack was made by a joint American and British force against the city of Hitachi during the night of 17/18 July. Groups of cruisers and destroyers subsequently shelled the Nojima Saki area on 18 July, and Shionomisaki on the night of 24/25 July. On 29 July, American and British warships attacked Hamamatsu, and on the night of 30/31 several American destroyers shelled Shimizu. The final bombardment took place on 9 August, when Kamaishi was attacked again by American, British and New Zealand warships. Two US Navy submarines conducted small-scale attacks during June and July 1945; one of the submarines also landed a small raiding party.

The Allied naval bombardments disrupted industrial production in the cities targeted, and convinced many Japanese civilians that the war was lost. Up to 1,739 Japanese were killed in the attacks, and about 1,497 were wounded. The only Allied casualties were 32 Allied prisoners of war killed in the bombardments of Kamaishi.

== Background ==
By mid-1945, during the last weeks of the Pacific War, cities and industrial facilities in the Japanese home islands were under sustained attack from United States Army Air Forces (USAAF) B-29 Superfortress heavy bombers based in the Mariana Islands. Attacks by Allied submarines and surface ships had also cut most of the country's trade routes, and US Navy aircraft carrier task groups had raided locations in the home islands on several occasions. Shortages of fuel had confined most of the Imperial Japanese Navy's surviving ships to port and forced them and the Imperial Japanese Army Air Service to hold its air units in reserve against the Allied invasion that was expected late in the year. Prior to the war, the Japanese military had assessed that coastal artillery was no longer suited to the country's circumstances. As a result, only a few strategic ports were protected by artillery capable of engaging enemy warships, and most of these guns were of relatively small caliber.

During the Pacific War, the US Navy's fast battleships had mainly been used to escort the groups of aircraft carriers that formed the United States Pacific Fleet's main striking force. They had also occasionally bombarded Japanese positions near the shore and had fought some actions with Japanese warships.

Allied naval commanders decided to use battleships to conduct a series of attacks against Japanese coastal cities in mid-1945. It was hoped that the Japanese military would respond to these bombardments by attacking the Allied forces with the aircraft that were being held in reserve to respond to the planned invasion of Japan, thereby exposing these aircraft to destruction by Allied fighter aircraft. However, the Japanese Imperial General Headquarters had anticipated that the Allies would conduct bombardments and other operations with this goal and decided to not attack naval forces operating off Japan. Instead, the aircraft would remain in reserve until Allied landing operations in the home islands began.

== Bombardments ==
=== First attack on Kamaishi ===
On 1 July 1945, the United States Third Fleet sortied from Leyte Gulf in the Philippines under the command of Admiral William Halsey to attack the Japanese home islands. Halsey's plans included the use of battleships and cruisers to bombard military facilities and factories. To prepare for these attacks, US Navy submarines sailed into Japan's inshore waters to search for naval mines. USAAF B-29 Superfortress and B-24 Liberator aircraft also conducted photo reconnaissance flights over much of Japan in search of airfields and facilities which could be attacked by the Third Fleet.

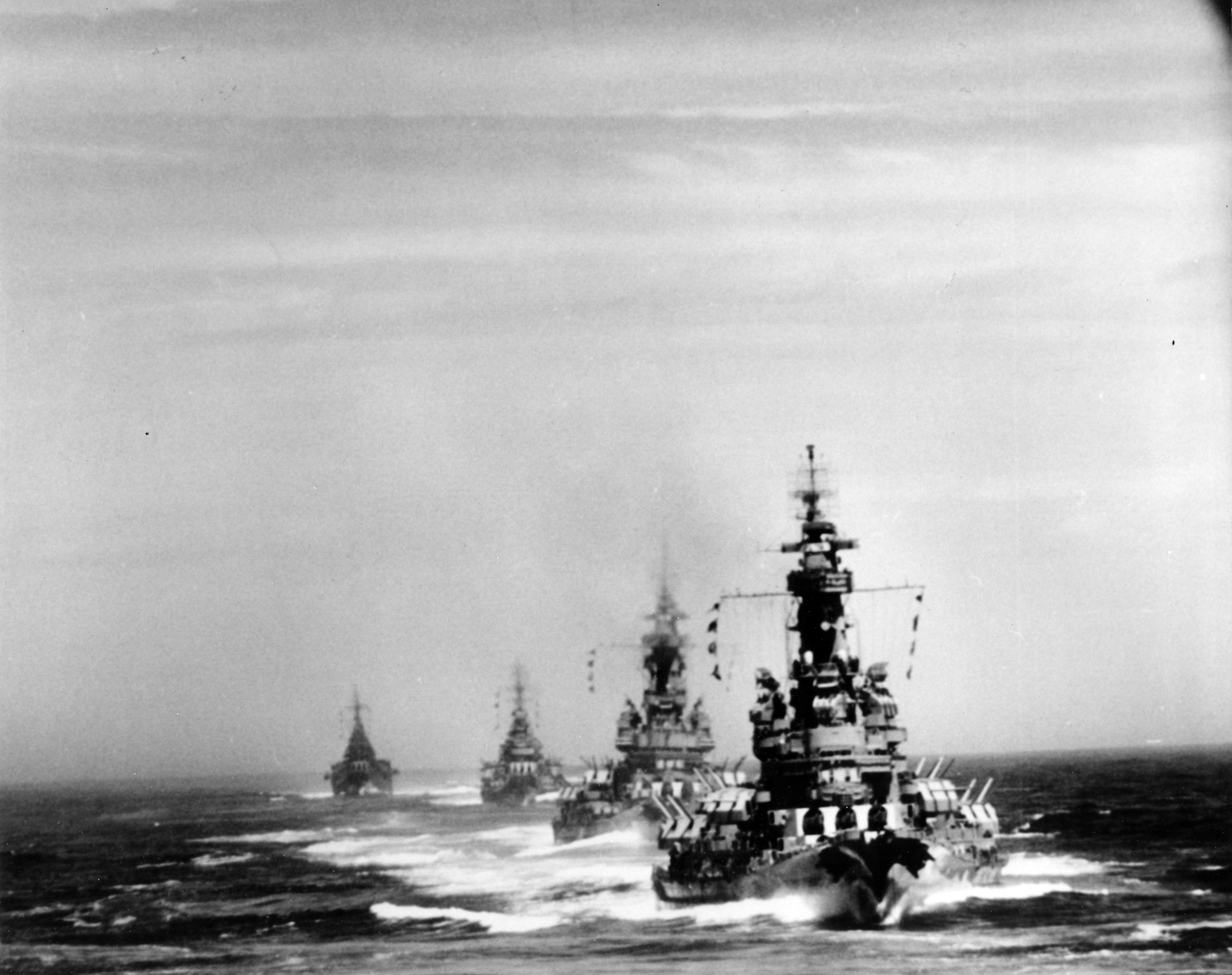
Ships of Task Unit 34.8.1 approaching Kamaishi on 14 July 1945

The Third Fleet's main component, Task Force 38 (TF 38), began striking targets in Japan on 10 July under the command of Vice Admiral John S. McCain. On this day, aircraft flying from the Task Force's aircraft carriers attacked facilities around Tokyo. Task Force 38 sailed north, and on 14 July began raids on Hokkaido and northern Honshu. These areas were outside the range of the B-29 Superfortress bombers, and had at that point not been attacked in the war. The American aircraft met little opposition, and sank 11 warships and 20 merchant ships. A further eight warships and 21 merchant ships were damaged, and the carrier aviators claimed to have destroyed 25 Japanese aircraft.

The first Allied bombardment of a Japanese coastal town was conducted on 14 July in conjunction with the air attacks on Hokkaido and northern Honshu. A bombardment group commanded by Rear Admiral John F. Shafroth Jr. designated Task Unit 34.8.1 (TU 34.8.1) was detached from TF 38 to attack the ironworks at Kamaishi in northern Honshu. At the time the city had a population of 40,000 and the ironworks was among the largest in Japan. However, due to shortages of coking coal and other raw materials, the ironworks was running at less than half its capacity. Allied prisoners of war had been assigned to work at the Nippon Steel Company, and were housed in two camps in Kamaishi. TU 34.8.1 comprised the battleships USS South Dakota, Indiana and Massachusetts as well as the heavy cruisers USS Quincy and Chicago and nine destroyers.

The bombardment group opened fire on the ironworks at 12:10 p.m. from a range of 29,000 yd (27,000 m). The ships then moved closer to the city, but did not cross the 100-fathom line as no minesweepers were available to clear the area of mines. The bombardment lasted for over two hours, during which time the force made six passes across the mouth of Kamaishi's harbor and fired 802 16-inch (406 mm) shells, 728 8-inch (203 mm) shells and 825 5-inch (127 mm) shells. While most of the shells landed within the grounds of the ironworks, the concussion from their explosions caused kitchen fires to break out across Kamaishi. The resulting smoke prevented US Navy aircraft from being able to support or spot for the warships, which continued to fire accurately on predetermined targets. No Japanese aircraft or coastal guns responded to this bombardment. Allied aircraft photographed the ironworks following the attack, but photo interpreters underestimated the extent to which they had been damaged. This was one of the first times that the Americans had used aerial photography to assess damage from a naval bombardment, and the interpreters placed too much weight on the fact that none of the ironworks' buildings had been destroyed. The Allies learned after the war that the ironworks had been extensively damaged and forced to cease production for a period. This resulted in a loss of the equivalent of four weeks of pig iron production and 2 1/2 months of coke production. The attack destroyed 1460 houses in the city, and killed 424 civilians. A total of 28 Japanese naval personnel also perished when their Type 28 submarine chaser was sunk in Kamaishi harbor by shellfire. Five Allied prisoners of war were killed by the bombardment.

=== Muroran ===
Major Allied naval air attacks and bombardments of targets in Japan in July–August 1945

On the night of 14/15 July, another bombardment unit—TU 34.8.2—was detached from TF 38 to attack Muroran on the south-east coast of Hokkaido. TU 34.8.2 was commanded by Rear Admiral Oscar C. Badger and comprised the battleships Iowa, Missouri and Wisconsin, the light cruisers Atlanta and Dayton, and eight destroyers. Admiral Halsey accompanied this force on board Missouri. The targets of this attack were the Japan Steel Company's facilities and the Wanishi Iron Works. Also that night, a force of four cruisers and six destroyers cruised along the east coast of Honshu seeking to attack Japanese shipping, but did not locate any targets.

TU 34.8.2's bombardment began at dawn on 15 July. The three battleships fired 860 16-inch shells at the city from a range of 28,000–32,000 yd (26,000–29,000 m). Aerial observation and spotting of damage was made difficult by hazy conditions, and only 170 shells landed within the grounds of the two plants. Nevertheless, considerable damage was inflicted on the industrial facilities, resulting in the loss of 2 1/2 months of coke production and slightly less pig iron production. Damage to buildings across the city was also extensive. As with the bombardment of Kamaishi, photo interpreters underestimated the scale of the damage. TU 34.8.2 was highly vulnerable to air attack throughout the more than six hour period in which it was visible from the shore of Hokkaido, and Halsey later wrote that these were the longest hours of his life. The failure of the Japanese to attack his ships convinced Halsey that they were preserving aircraft for use against the Allied invasion force. On 15 July, aircraft flying from TF 38's aircraft carriers struck again at Hokkaido and northern Honshu, devastating the fleet of ships that carried coal between the two islands.

=== Hitachi ===
The attacks on Hokkaido and northern Honshu ended on 15 July, and TF 38 sailed away from the Japanese coast to refuel and rendezvous with the main body of the British Pacific Fleet, which was designated Task Force 37 (TF 37). On the morning of 17 July, the British and American carriers attacked targets to the north of Tokyo. Later that day, TU 34.8.2 detached from the carrier force to bombard targets around the city of Hitachi, about 80 mi (130 km) northeast of Tokyo. This force was commanded by Rear Admiral Badger and comprised the battleships Iowa, Missouri, Wisconsin, North Carolina, Alabama, and HMS King George V, light cruisers Atlanta and Dayton, and eight American and two British destroyers. King George V and her two escorts sailed astern of the American force, and operated independently. Halsey again accompanied this force on board Missouri.

The bombardment of the Hitachi area took place on the night of 17/18 July. Rain and fog made locating the targets difficult and prevented spotting aircraft from flying, but several carrier aircraft flew protective patrols over the bombardment force. The Allied warships opened fire at 11:10 p.m., and aimed at their targets using radar and LORAN. The attackers targeted nine industrial facilities, and King George V was assigned similar targets to those engaged by the American battleships. By the time the bombardment ceased at about 1:10 a.m., the American battleships had fired 1,238 16-inch shells, and the British battleship 267 14-inch (356 mm) shells. The two light cruisers also fired 292 6-inch (152 mm) shells at radar and electronics installations south of Hitachi. All firing was conducted at a range of 23,000–35,000 yd (21,000–32,000 m).

The attack on Hitachi had mixed results. Only three of the bombardment's nine targets were hit, and the overall damage to the city's industrial area was assessed as "slight". However, the attack inflicted considerable damage on the city's urban area and essential services. This damage was greatly increased by a B-29 raid on Hitachi on the night of 18/19 July that destroyed or damaged 79 percent of the city's urban area. The official history of the US Navy in World War II states that "individual Japanese" considered the naval bombardment to have been more terrifying than the air attack.

=== Nojima Saki and Shionomisaki ===
On 18 July TFs 37 and 38 conducted further air strikes in the Tokyo area, with the American force's main effort being an attempt to sink the Japanese battleship Nagato at Yokosuka Naval Base. That night, Cruiser Division 17 (CruDiv 17), which comprised the light cruisers USS Astoria, Pasadena, Springfield, and Wilkes-Barre and six destroyers under the command of Rear Admiral J. Cary Jones, fired 240 6-inch (152 mm) shells at a radar station on Cape Nojima over a five-minute period, but did not hit it.

After completing its strikes on the Tokyo region, the Allied fleet conducted an at-sea replenishment from 21 to 23 July before attacking Kure and the Inland Sea from the 24th to the 28th of the month. On the night of 24–25 July, CruDiv 17 patrolled the Kii Channel and bombarded the naval seaplane base at Kushimoto, a landing field near Cape Shionomisaki, and a radio station. This attack lasted for only four minutes and caused little damage.

=== Hamamatsu ===
On 29 July, a group of warships was detached from the main body of the Allied fleet to bombard the city of Hamamatsu, which lies on the south coast of Honshu between Nagoya and Tokyo. This force comprised the same ships which had attacked Kamaishi on 14 July with the addition of King George V and the destroyers HMS Ulysses, Undine and Urania; the four British ships were designated Task Unit 37.1.2 (TU 37.1.2). The Task unit was again under command of Rear admiral John F. Shafroth Jr. The city had previously suffered extensive damage from air attacks.

The British and American ships engaged their targets independently. King George V opened fire at the Japan Musical Instrument Company's Plant No. 2 (which was being used to manufacture aircraft propellers) at 11:19 p.m. from a range of 20,075 yd (18,357 m). The battleship fired 265 14-inch rounds at the plant in 27 minutes and was able to make use of artillery spotting aircraft, with visibility being good. Even so, little damage was inflicted on the facility. Massachusetts fired at Plant No. 1 but scored only a few hits. Despite the limited physical damage, the shelling caused increased labor absenteeism and disruption to vital services that caused the factory to cease production. The American ships also shelled the Imperial Government Railway locomotive works and three other industrial facilities.

Of these targets, the locomotive works ceased operations for about three months due to damage, but two of the other facilities had almost ceased production before the attack and the third was not damaged. Two bridges on the important Tōkaidō Main Line were fired upon but not hit, though damage to rail infrastructure in Hamamatsu closed the line for 66 hours. During the bombardment Undine twice opened fire on small groups of ships that were probably fishing boats. No Japanese aircraft or shore batteries responded to the Allied attack. The bombardment of Hamamatsu was the last time a British battleship fired its guns in anger.

=== Shimizu ===
The next bombardment of Japan took place on the night of 30/31 July. On that night Destroyer Squadron 25 (DesRon 25), which was commanded by Captain J.W. Ludewig aboard USS John Rodgers, searched the Suruga Gulf for Japanese shipping to attack. No ships were located, and in the early hours of 31 July the squadron sailed deep into the gulf and fired 1,100 rounds of 5-inch shells during seven minutes at a railway yard and aluminum plant in Shimizu. The aluminum plant was hit, but this was of little importance as it had almost ceased production due to a shortage of raw materials. No damage was caused to the rail yard.

=== Second attack on Kamaishi ===
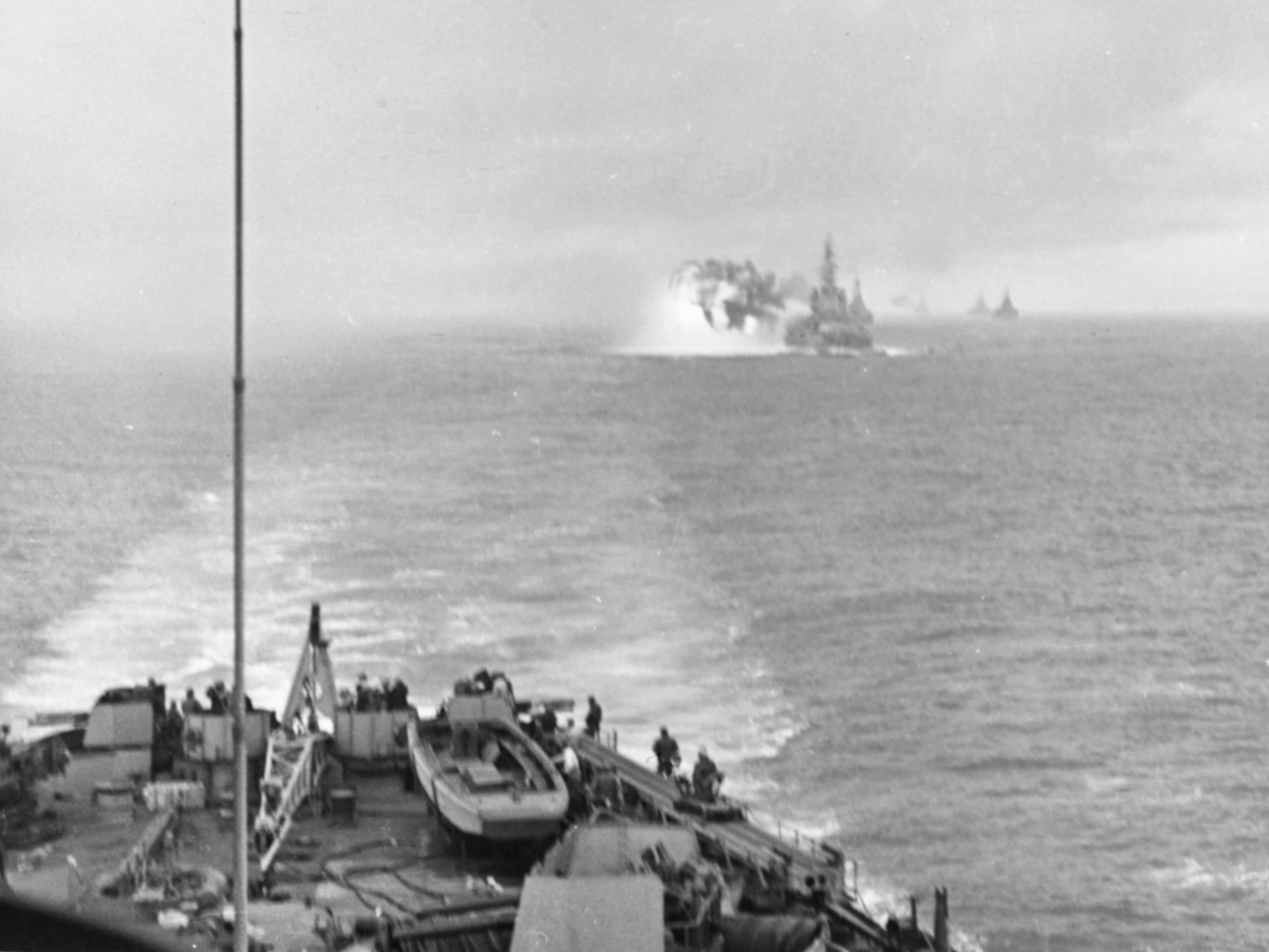
USS Massachusetts firing at Kamaishi on 9 August 1945

During the last days of July and into early August, the Allied fleet sailed away from the Japanese coast to avoid a typhoon and allow the ships to replenish their stocks of fuel and ammunition. The fleet then sailed north and, on both 9 and 10 August, the carrier aircraft attacked a large concentration of Japanese aircraft on airfields in northern Honshu. The carrier pilots claimed the destruction of 720 Japanese aircraft in this operation.

As part of these operations off northern Japan, Kamaishi was bombarded again on 9 August in the mistaken belief that the ironworks had not been badly damaged. TU 34.8.1 conducted this attack, and comprised the ships that had bombarded the city in July with the addition of the heavy cruisers USS Boston and Saint Paul, British light cruiser HMS Newfoundland, Royal New Zealand Navy light cruiser HMNZS Gambia, and destroyers HMS Terpsichore, Termagant, and Tenacious. King George V did not participate in this action as mechanical problems affecting two of her propeller shafts meant that she was unable to sail at the speed specified for the bombardment force.

The Allied ships opened fire on the ironworks and docks in Kamaishi at 12:54 p.m. The bombardment was conducted from an average range of 14,000 yd (13,000 m) and lasted for almost two hours. During this time, the ships made 4 passes across Kamaishi harbor and fired 803 16-inch shells, 1,383 8-inch shells, and 733 6-inch shells. Gambia fired the final shots of the attack. During the bombardment, several Japanese aircraft approached the Allied ships and two were shot down by Allied naval fighters. This bombardment caused more damage than the attack conducted in July, and large quantities of pig iron were destroyed. The attack was also directed against housing areas near the ironworks, destroying total of 1471 houses and killing 281 civilians. The sounds of this bombardment were broadcast live on radio in the United States via a radio relay on board Iowa. One of the prisoner of war camps in Kamaishi was destroyed by this second Allied attack, resulting in the deaths of 27 Allied prisoners.

A further bombardment by King George V, three light cruisers, and escorting destroyers was planned to be conducted against an unspecified Japanese target on 13 August. This attack was cancelled for both the battleship's mechanical problems and the atomic bombings of Hiroshima and Nagasaki. The Allied fleet did not conduct any other bombardments, as Japan surrendered on 15 August.

=== Submarine attacks ===
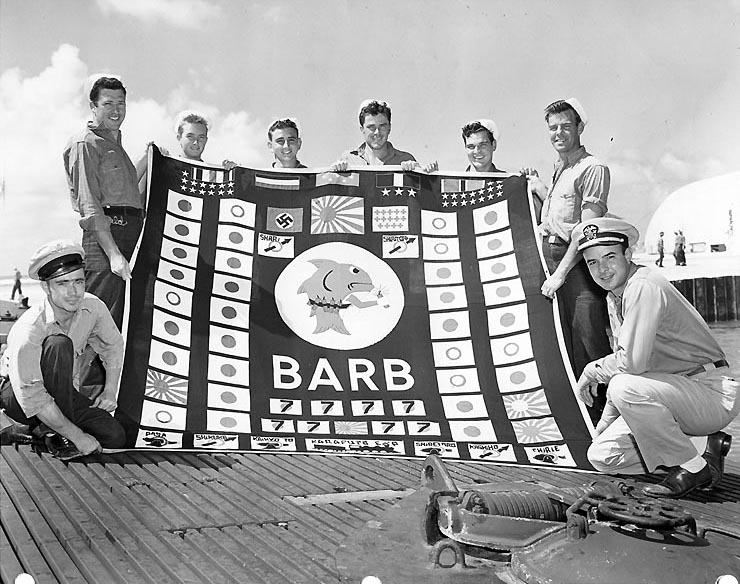
The members of USS Barb's crew who were landed in Japan on 23 July 1945 posing with the submarine's battle flag. It includes symbols marking the destruction of a train in this operation, shown in the middle bottom, as well as the submarine's shore bombardments.

Two US Navy submarines attacked locations in the Japanese home islands during June and July 1945. On 20 June USS Barb arrived off Japan's northern islands of Hokkaido and southern Sakhalin (now part of Russia's Sakhalin oblast) under the command of Commander Gene Fluckey. For this patrol the submarine had been fitted with an experimental 5-inch (127 mm) rocket launcher intended for shore bombardments. Shortly after midnight on 22 June the submarine fired 12 rockets at Shari in north-east Hokkaido. Barb then proceeded north, and on 2 July bombarded Kaiyo in south-east Sakhalin with its deck gun. This attack destroyed three sampans docked in the town, damaged a seal rookery and caused several fires to break out. The next day the submarine fired more rockets at Shisuka. A party of eight men from Barb was landed on the east coast of Sakhalin on 23 July and planted demolition charges on a railroad track. Shortly after the men began rowing back to the submarine the charges were triggered by a passing train; 150 people, including civilians, were killed. On 24 July, Barb fired 32 rockets at Shirutoru (ja:知取町) and 12 rockets at Kashiho, Motodomari (ja:元泊村). As the submarine returned to base it shelled Chiri on 25 July and Shibetoro the next day. The attack on Shibetoro targeted a shipyard building sampans, and destroyed 35 newly built vessels.

The other submarine bombardment took place during the morning of 24 June, when USS Trutta fired some shells at the island of Hirado Shima in the Tsushima Strait between Japan and Korea. This attack sought to convince the Japanese that a force of American submarines that had been operating in the Sea of Japan would attempt to depart via the Tsushima Strait, instead of their actual route far to the north through the La Pérouse Strait between Hokkaido and Sakhalin.

== Results ==
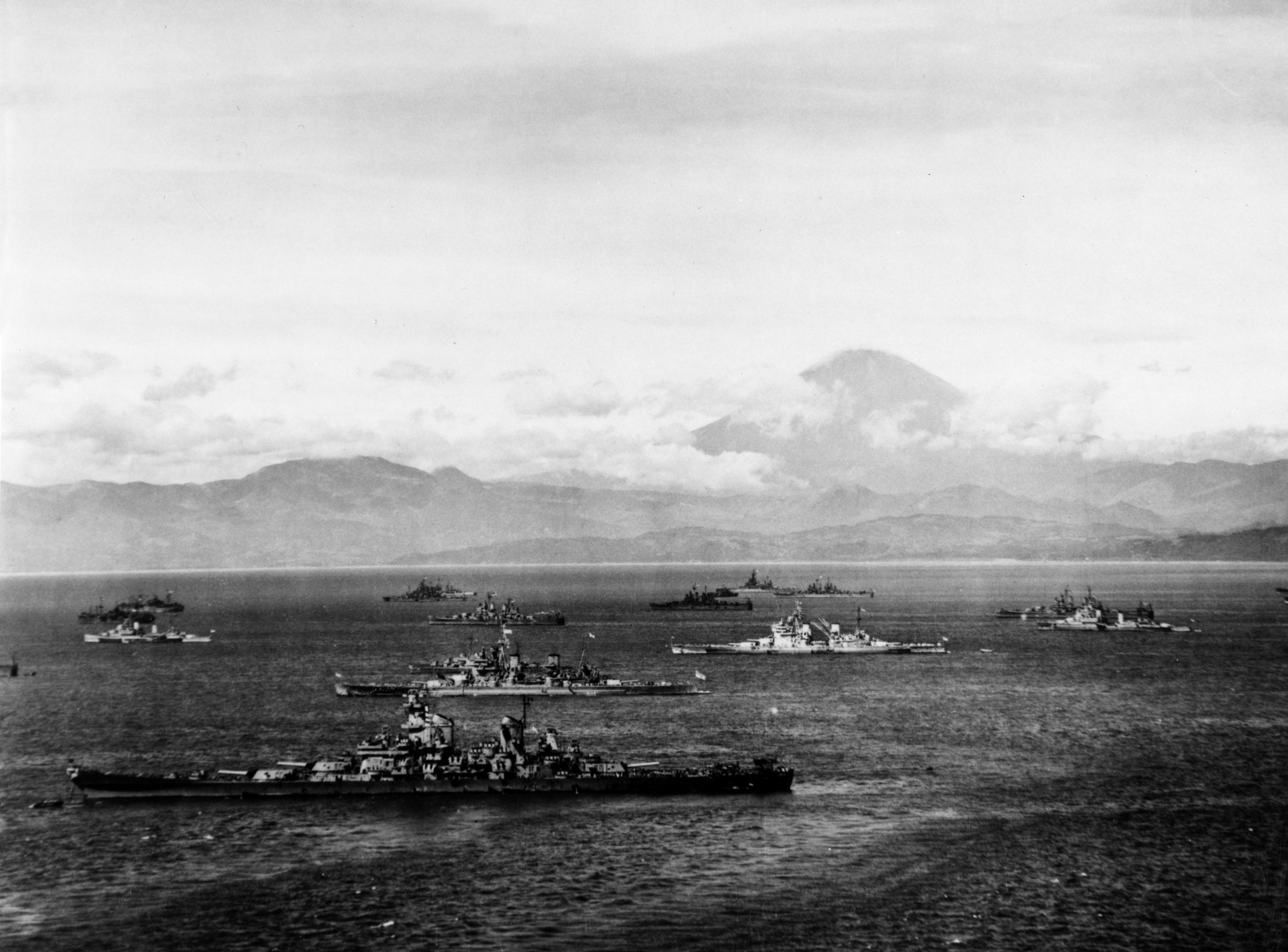
Battleships USS Missouri, HMS Duke of York, HMS King George V, and USS Colorado and other Allied warships in Sagami Bay on 28 August 1945

Although the naval bombardments did not result in the reaction the Allies were hoping for from the Japanese military, they disrupted the country's steel industry. While several of the factories attacked were operating at reduced capacity, the important Kamaishi and Wanishi Iron Works suffered heavy damage when they were bombarded in July and August. During both these attacks, the Allied gunnery was accurate and focused on the factories' coke batteries, which were critical to continued production. Post-war assessments found that the damage caused to industrial buildings by even the approximately 2,000 lb (910 kg) 16-inch naval shells was less than that which could be inflicted by the 2,000 lb (910 kg) and 1,000 lb (450 kg) general-purpose bombs that were used by Allied naval aircraft. While this supported a view put forward by Vice Admiral McCain that the aircraft assigned to protect the bombardment forces could have caused more damage than the ships themselves, the post-war United States Strategic Bombing Survey judged that the naval bombardments were justified as there had been little risk to the ships involved.

The bombardments also affected Japanese morale. Japanese civilians who experienced both air and naval bombardment found the naval attacks to be more terrifying due to their unpredictability and longer duration. Several of the industrial facilities that suffered little damage in bombardments incurred a significant loss in production due to absenteeism and reduced productivity. This was not the case for all facilities that were attacked though, and the morale among workers in two of the bombarded factories was reported to have increased. The appearance of Allied warships just off the coast also convinced many Japanese that the war had been lost. However, such attitudes did not contribute to bringing the war to an end as the views of civilians had little influence on the Japanese Government's decision to surrender.

In 1949, the Japanese Economic Stabilization Agency calculated that the Allied naval bombardments and other forms of attack other than bombing had caused 3,282 casualties, representing 0.5 percent of all casualties inflicted by the Allies in the Japanese home islands. The casualties attributed to naval bombardments and other causes included 1,739 fatalities, 46 persons who were still classified as missing and 1,497 people who were wounded.
