= USS Concord (CL-10) =

Omaha-class light cruiser

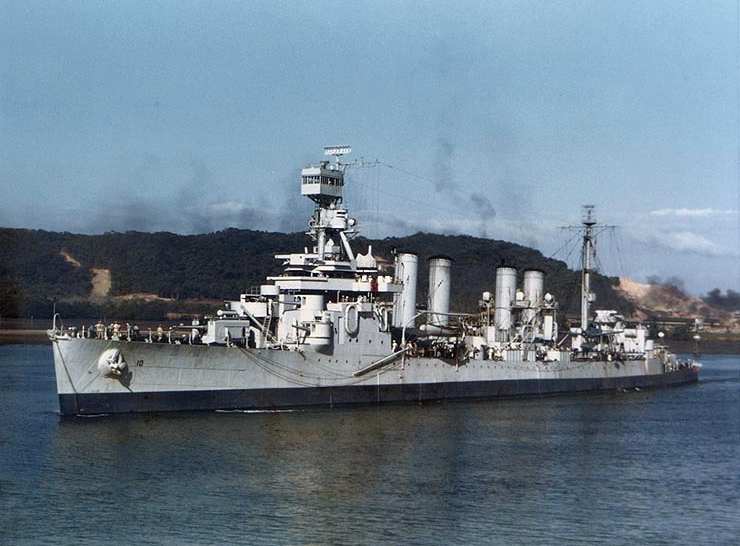
- USS Concord (January 1943)

History

United States
- Name: Concord
- Namesake: Town of Concord, Massachusetts
- Ordered: 29 August 1916; 4 March 1917
- Awarded: 30 July 1917; 11 July 1919 (supplementary contract)
- Builder: William Cramp & Sons, Philadelphia
- Yard number: 449
- Laid down: 29 March 1920
- Launched: 15 December 1921
- Sponsored by: Miss H. Butterick
- Commissioned: 3 November 1923
- Decommissioned: 12 December 1945
- Stricken: 8 January 1946
- Identification: Hull symbol: CL-10; Code letters: NIRV
- Honors and awards: 1 × battle star
- Fate: Sold for scrap 21 January 1947

General characteristics (as built)
- Class & type: Omaha-class light cruiser
- Displacement: 7,050 long tons (7,163 t) (standard); 9,508 long tons (9,661 t) (loaded)
- Length: 555 ft 6 in (169.32 m) oa; 550 ft (170 m) pp
- Beam: 55 ft (17 m)
- Draft: 14 ft 3 in (4.34 m) (mean)
- Installed power: 12 × White-Forster boilers; 90,000 ihp (67,000 kW) (Estimated power produced on trials)
- Propulsion: 4 × Parsons steam turbines; 4 × screws
- Speed: 35 knots (65 km/h; 40 mph); 33.7 knots (62.4 km/h; 38.8 mph) (Estimated speed on Trial)
- Crew: 29 officers 429 enlisted (peace time)
- Armament: 2 × twin 6 in (150 mm)/53 caliber guns; 8 × single 6 in/53 caliber guns; 4 × 3 in (76 mm)/50 caliber guns anti-aircraft; 2 × triple 21 in (533 mm) torpedo tubes; 2 × twin 21 in torpedo tubes; 224 × mines (removed soon after completion)
- Armor: Belt: 3 in (76 mm); Deck: 1 1/2 in (38 mm); Conning Tower: 1 1/2 in; Bulkheads: 1 1/2-3 in
- Aircraft carried: 2 × floatplanes
- Aviation facilities: 2 × Amidship catapults; crane

General characteristics (1945)
- Armament: 2 × twin 6 in/53 caliber; 6 × single 6 in/53 caliber; 8 × 3 in/50 caliber anti-aircraft guns; 2 × triple 21 in torpedo tubes; 3 × twin 40 mm (1.6 in) Bofors guns; 12 × single 20 mm (0.79 in) Oerlikon cannons

USS Concord (CL-10) was an Omaha-class light cruiser, originally classified as a scout cruiser, of the United States Navy. She was the fourth Navy ship named for the town of Concord, Massachusetts, the site of the first battle of the American Revolution. She spent the first nine years of her career in the Atlantic as part of the Scouting Force. Concord transferred to the Pacific in 1932 and spent the rest of her career, except for the winter of 1938–1939, stationed there. Her home port moved to Pearl Harbor in April 1940, but she escaped the attack on Pearl Harbor because she was in San Diego for an overhaul.

== Built in Philadelphia, Pennsylvania ==
Concord was authorized on 29 August 1916, and assigned to William Cramp & Sons, Philadelphia on 30 July 1917. She was laid down on 29 March 1920, and launched on 15 December 1921, sponsored by Miss H. Butterick. Concord was commissioned on 3 November 1923, with future Admiral, Captain Orin G. Murfin in command.

Concord was 550 feet (170 metres) long at the waterline with an overall length of 555 feet 6 inches (169.32 metres), her beam was 55 feet 4 inches (16.87 metres) and a mean draft of 13 feet 6 inches (4.11 metres). Her standard displacement was 7,050 long tons (7,160 t) and 9,508 long tons (9,661 t) at full load. Her crew, during peacetime, consisted of 29 officers and 429 enlisted men.

Concord was powered by four Parsons steam turbines geared steam turbines, each driving one screw, using steam generated by 12 White-Forster boilers. The engines were designed to produce 90,000 indicated horsepower (67,000 kW) and reach a top speed of 35 knots (65 km/h; 40 mph). She was designed to provide a range of 10,000 nautical miles (19,000 km; 12,000 mi) at a speed of 10 knots (19 km/h; 12 mph), but was only capable of 8,460 nautical miles (15,670 km; 9,740 mi) at a speed of 10 knots (19 km/h; 12 mph)

Concord's main armament went through many changes while she was being designed. Originally she was to mount ten 6 in (150 mm)/53 caliber guns; two on either side at the waist, with the remaining eight mounted in tiered casemates on either side of the fore and aft superstructures. After America's entry into World War I the US Navy worked alongside the Royal Navy and it was decided to mount four 6-in/53 caliber guns in two twin gun turrets fore and aft and keep the eight guns in the tiered casemates so that she would have an eight gun broadside and, due to limited arcs of fire from the casemate guns, four to six guns firing fore or aft. Her secondary armament consisted of two 3 in (76 mm)/50 caliber anti-aircraft guns in single mounts. Concord was initially built with the capacity to carry 224 mines, but these were removed early in her career to make way for more crew accommodations. She also carried two triple and two twin, above-water, torpedo tube mounts for 21 in (530 mm) torpedoes. The triple mounts were fitted on either side of the upper deck, aft of the aircraft catapults, and the twin mounts were one deck lower on either side, covered by hatches in the side of the hull.

The ship lacked a full-length waterline armor belt. The sides of her boiler and engine rooms and steering gear were protected by 3 inches (76 mm) of armor. The transverse bulkheads at the end of her machinery rooms were 1.5 inches (38 mm) thick forward and three inches thick aft. The deck over the machinery spaces and steering gear had a thickness of 1.5 inches. The gun turrets were not armored and only provided protection against muzzle blast and the conning tower had 1.5 inches of armor. Concord carried two floatplanes aboard that were stored on the two catapults. Initially these were probably Vought VE-9s until the early 1930s, when the ship may have operated OJ-2 until 1935, and Curtiss SOC Seagulls until 1940, when Vought OS2U Kingfishers were used on ships without hangars.

=== Armament changes ===
During her career Concord went through several armament changes, some of these changes were to save weight, but others were to increase her AA armament. The lower torpedo tube mounts proved to be very wet and were removed, and the openings plated over, before the start of World War II. Another change made before the war was to increase the 3–inch guns to eight, all mounted in the ship's waist. After 1940, the lower aft 6–inch guns were removed and the casemates plated over for the same reason as the lower torpedo mounts. The ship's anti-aircraft armament were augmented by three twin 40 mm (1.6 in) Bofors guns along with 12 20 mm (0.79 in) Oerlikon cannons by the end of the war.

== Service history ==
=== Inter-war period ===
On her maiden cruise, from 23 November 1923 – 9 April 1924, Concord called at Mediterranean ports, passed through the Suez Canal to round the Cape of Good Hope, and exercised with the fleet in the Caribbean before returning to Philadelphia. As flagship of Commander, Destroyer Squadrons, Scouting Fleet, she cruised the Caribbean and sailed through the Panama Canal to exercise in the Hawaiian Islands in 1924–1925. Continuing to operate in the Atlantic, she joined in the Presidential Fleet Review taken by Calvin Coolidge on 4 June 1927.

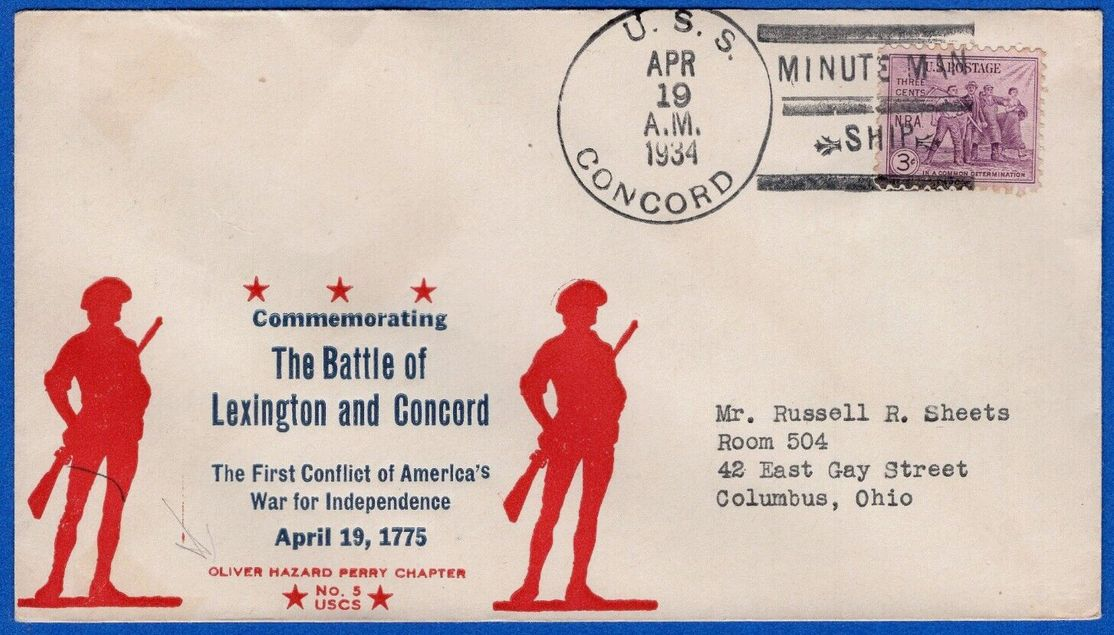
Official Naval Postmark and Cachet, mailed via Naval Post Office, USS Concord

Serving as flagship of Commander, Cruiser Division 3 (CruDiv 3), Battle Force, Concord cruised the Pacific from her base at San Diego after early 1932, exercising in the Canal Zone and the Caribbean in 1934. On 12 February 1935, she rescued 11 members of the crew of the downed airship USS Macon. She took part in Presidential Fleet Reviews taken by Franklin D. Roosevelt on 30 September 1935 and 12 July 1938, and joined in fleet exercises in the Hawaiian area, in the Canal Zone, and off Alaska. After operating on the east coast in the winter of 1938–39, she returned to Pacific operations, and from 1 April 1940, was based at Pearl Harbor for a training schedule which intensified as war came closer.

=== World War II ===
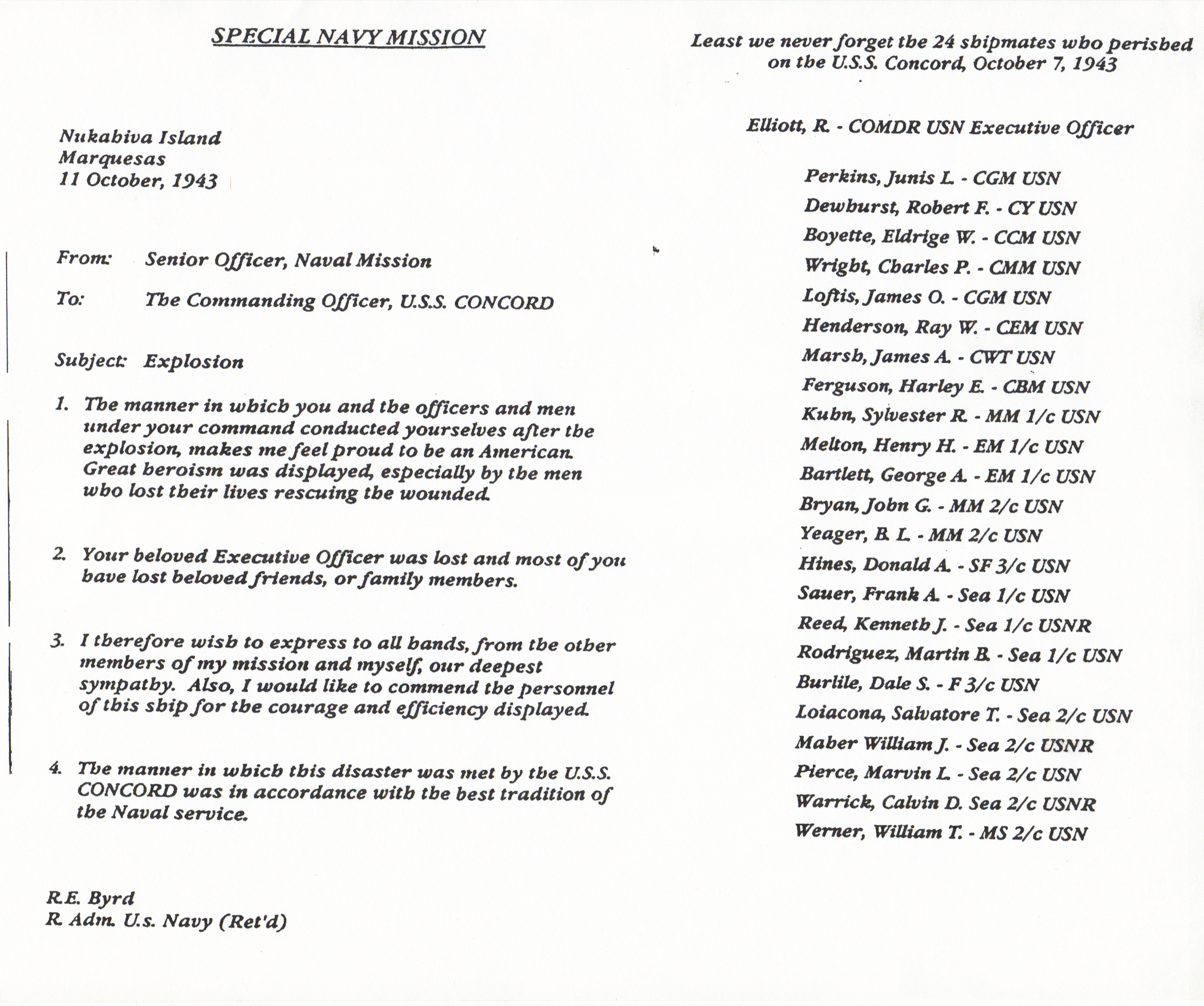
Letter from Admiral Byrd to Commanding Officer, Captain Irving Reynolds Chambers, USS Concord, commemorating the loss of 24 men during the special mission, September–November 1943

When the US entered the war, Concord was at San Diego preparing for a shipyard overhaul which she completed early in February 1942. Assigned to the Southeast Pacific Force, she escorted convoys to Bora Bora in the Society Islands, exercised in the Canal Zone, and cruised along the coast of South America and to the islands of the southeast Pacific, serving from time to time as flagship of her force.

From 5 September – 24 November 1943, with Captain Irving Reynolds Chambers, commanding, she carried Rear Admiral Richard E. Byrd on a tour to survey the potential use of a number of southeast Pacific islands in national defense and commercial aviation. During this cruise, she suffered a gasoline explosion which killed 24 men including her executive officer, and caused considerable damage, which was repaired at Balboa, Panama.

With repairs completed in March 1944, Concord set sail northward to join the Northern Pacific Force at Adak on 2 April. Serving as the flagship of Task Force 94 (TF 94) at the beginning of this duty, she joined in bombardments of the Kuriles which continued at intervals until the close of the war, preventing effective use by the Japanese of their bases there. Harassing the northern shipping lanes of Japan, her force sank several small craft, and on 25 August 1944, the destroyers of the force made an attack on a Japanese convoy.

On 31 August 1945, Concord stood out from Adak, covered the occupation landings at Ominato, Japan, from 8–14 September, and sailed on to Pearl Harbor, the Canal Zone, Boston, and Philadelphia, where she was decommissioned on 12 December, and sold for scrap on 21 January 1947. Before she was scrapped, the turret that fired the last shot of the War was removed. Concord's bell is displayed near Monument Square in her namesake town of Concord, MA.

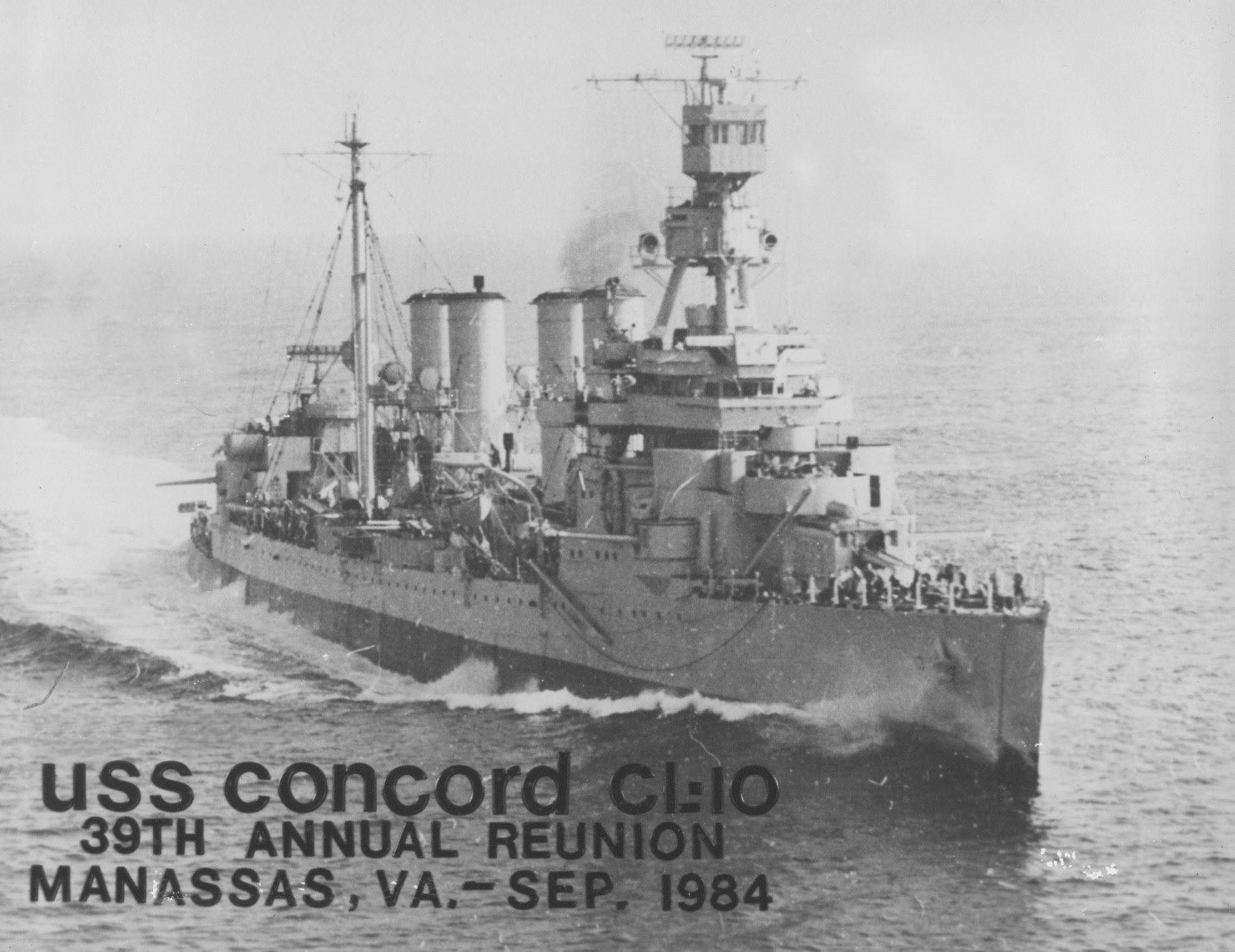
Photos of the USS Concord given out to former crew members at the 39th annual reunion.

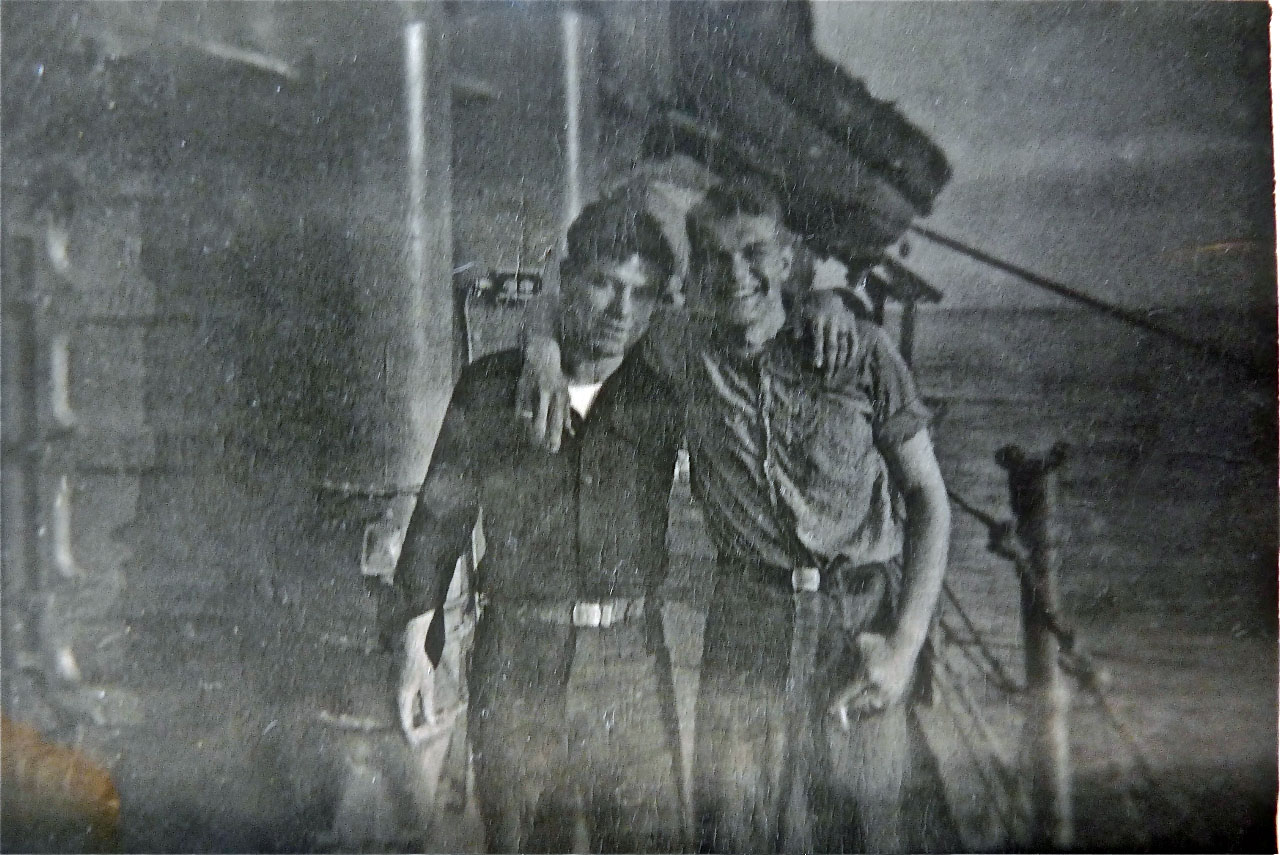
Photos of the USS Concord crew member Harold Clifford DeLong and other crew member on USS Concord at sea.

== Awards ==
- American Defense Service Medal with "FLEET" clasp
- Asiatic-Pacific Campaign Medal with one battle star for World War II service
- World War II Victory Medal
