= John R. Beardall =

United States Navy officer (1887–1967)

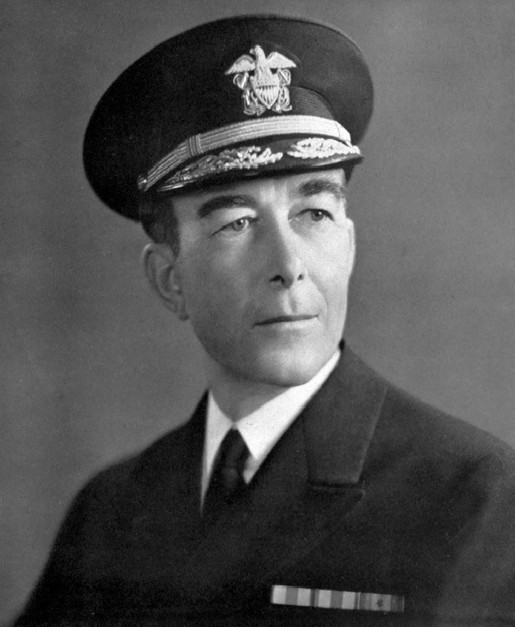
- Born: John Reginald Beardall; February 7, 1887; Sanford, Florida, U.S.
- Died: January 4, 1967 (aged 79); Winter Park, Florida, U.S.
- Burial place: Arlington National Cemetery
- Alma mater: United States Naval Academy
- Spouse: Edith Jett McCormick (m. 1917)
- Children: 3
- Military career
- Allegiance: United States
- Branch: United States Navy
- Service years: 1908–1946
- Rank: Rear Admiral
- Commands: Superintendent of the United States Naval Academy
- Conflicts: World War I World War II
- Awards: Legion of Merit (2); Navy and Marine Corps Medal

John Reginald Beardall (February 7, 1887 – January 4, 1967) was a rear admiral in the United States Navy. He was superintendent of the United States Naval Academy in Annapolis, Maryland, from January 31, 1942, to August 16, 1945. He was a 1908 graduate of the Naval Academy and aide to the Secretary of the Navy, from 1936 to 1939.

== Early life ==
John R. Beardall was born to Florence (née Bonser) and William Beardall. His father was a city engineer in Sanford, Florida. He attended school there until the family moved to Orlando following the death of his father in 1900. He then attended school in Orlando. He attended Porter Military Academy and later graduated from the United States Naval Academy in 1908.

== Career ==
Beardall served on USS Illinois as part of the Great White Fleet that toured the world in 1908. During World War I, he served on USS Kansas and was a gunnery officer on USS New Hampshire. He commanded the destroyer USS Sands and also commanded the destroyer USS Gilmer and the cruiser USS Vincennes. He served on the cruiser USS Minneapolis and the cruiser USS Rochester. Prior to World War II, he was an assistant naval aide to England.

Beardall was aide to Navy Secretary Carl A. Swanson from 1936 to 1939. President Franklin D. Roosevelt selected Beardall as his naval aide while Beardall was commanding USS Vincennes. He served as naval aide to Roosevelt from May 1941 to January 1942. In September 1941, he was selected by Roosevelt for promotion to rear admiral. He then served as superintendent at the United States Naval Academy from 1942 to 1945. He became commandant of the Fifteenth Naval District and the Panama Sea Frontier. He served in that role until June 1946. He retired on November 1, 1946.

== Personal life ==
Beardall married Edith Jett McCormick, daughter of A. M. D. McCormick, in February 1917. They had a daughter and two sons, Mrs. Y. Fitzhugh Hardcastle, Geoffrey Bonser and John R. Jr. His brother was Orlando mayor William Beardall. He was a member of the Army and Navy Club in Washington, D.C. He was an Episcopalian. After retiring, he lived in Berryville, Virginia. He moved to Winter Park, Florida, in 1958.

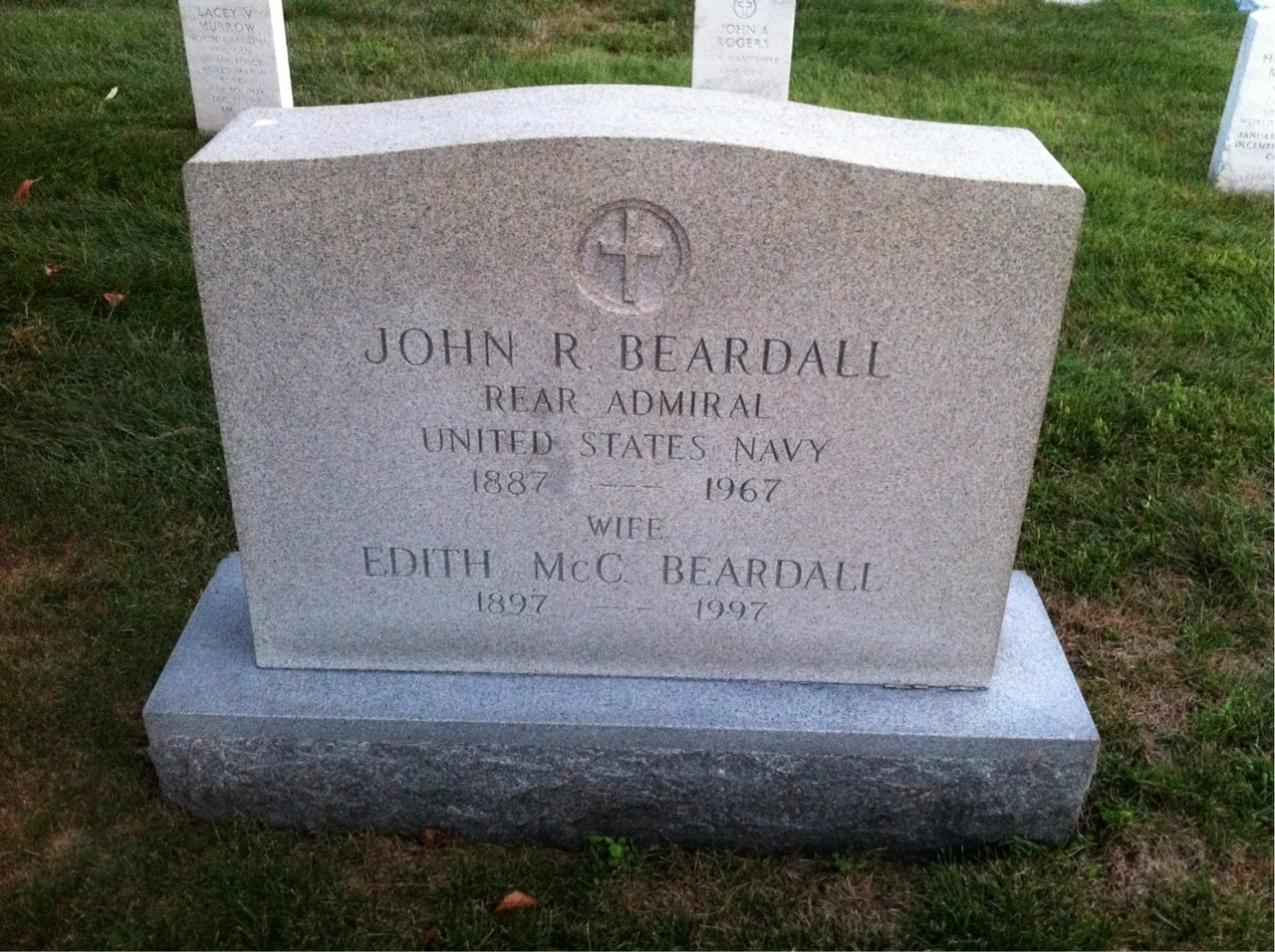
Grave of Beardall in Arlington National Cemetery

Beardall died from a stroke on January 4, 1967, aged 79, in Winter Park. He was buried in Arlington National Cemetery.

== Decorations ==

1st Row	Legion of Merit with Oak Leaf Cluster		
2nd Row	Navy and Marine Corps Medal	Navy Expeditionary Medal	Mexican Service Medal
3rd Row	World War I Victory Medal with Escort Clasp	American Defense Service Medal	American Campaign Medal
4th Row	World War II Victory Medal	Legion of Honour, Officer (France)	Order of Abdon Calderón, 1st Class (Ecuador)
5th Row	Grand Officer of the Order of Vasco Núñez de Balboa (Panama)	Grand Officer of the Order of the Sun of Peru	Grand Officer of the Military Order of Ayacucho (Peru)

== Awards ==
Beardall received an honorary Doctor of Laws degree from Temple University in 1942 and an honorary Doctor of Science degree from the University of California, Los Angeles in 1944. He received the William Fremont Blackman Medal for "service to mankind" from Rollins College in 1964.

Academic offices
Preceded by Russell Willson	Superintendent of United States Naval Academy; 1942-1945	Succeeded by Aubrey W. Fitch
