= William R. Munroe =

American Vice admiral

William Robert Munroe
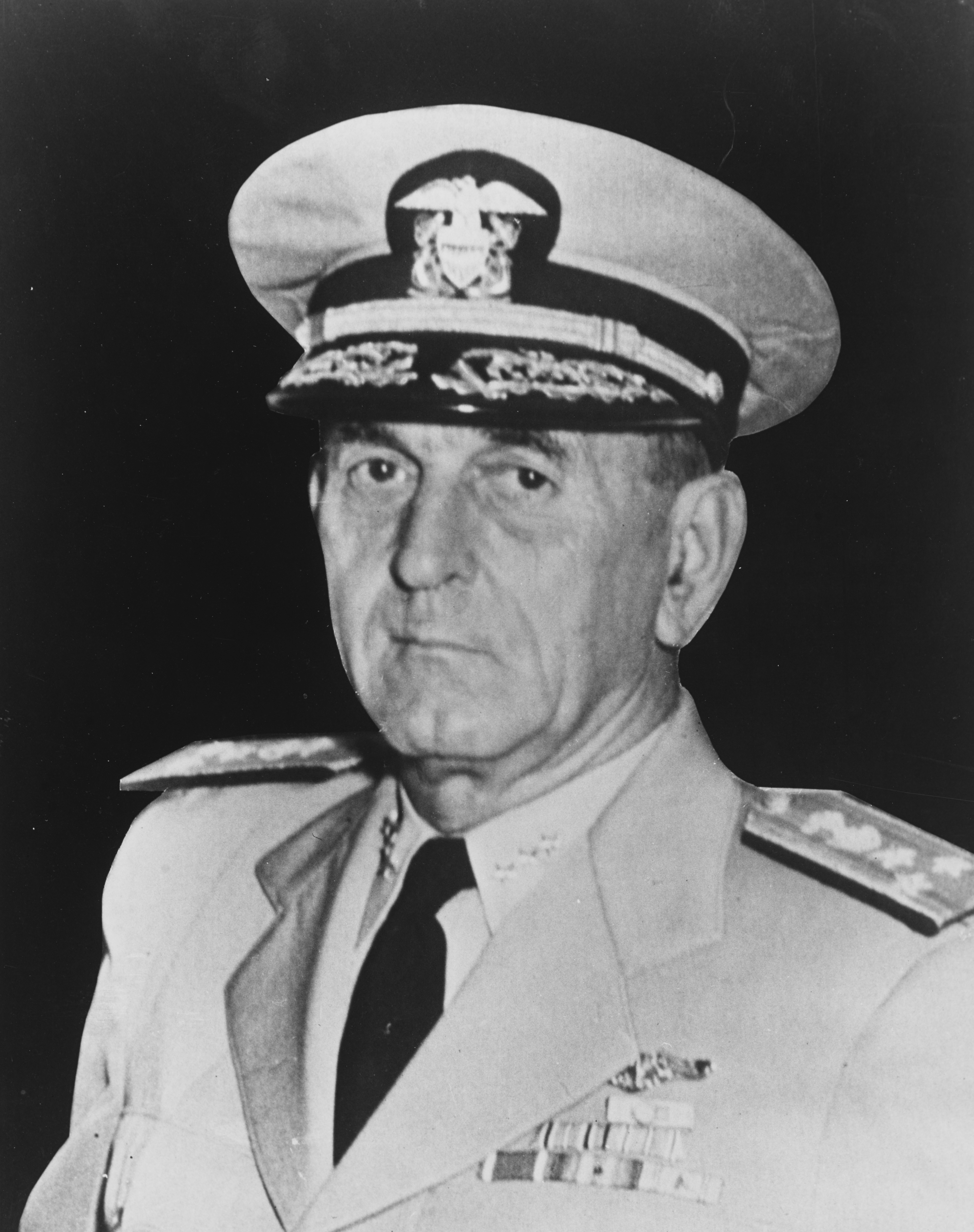
- VADM William R. Munroe, USN
- Born: April 8, 1886; Waco, Texas, US
- Died: March 1, 1966 (aged 79); La Jolla, California, US
- Burial place: Fort Rosecrans Cemetery
- Military career
- Allegiance: United States
- Branch: United States Navy
- Service years: 1908-1947
- Rank: Vice Admiral
- Nickname: "Bob"
- Commands: United States Fourth Fleet; Gulf Sea Frontier; Third Naval District; Battleship Division 3 USS Mississippi; USS R-17; USS N-3
- Conflicts: Cuban Pacification; World War I World War II: Battle of the Atlantic
- Awards: Distinguished Service Medal; Legion of Merit (2); Commendation Medal

William Robert Munroe (April 8, 1886 – March 1, 1966) was a decorated officer in the United States Navy with the rank of Vice Admiral. He trained as submarine commander and at the beginning of World War II, he served as Commander, Battleship Division 3 during Neutrality Patrol in the Atlantic ocean.

He later served as Commander, Gulf Sea Frontier and Seventh Naval District, tasked with the protection of both coasts of Florida, the Gulf of Mexico, the Yucatan Channel, and most of Cuba against threat of german U-boats. In later 1944, Munroe was promoted to command of United States Fourth Fleet patrolling South Atlantic until the end of War.

== Early career ==
William R. Munroe was born on April 8, 1886, in Waco, Texas, the son of Judge Richard Irby Munroe and Mary Lelia Davidson. He graduated from the high school and entered the Baylor University in Waco in summer 1902. Munroe remained there until the end of 1903, when he received an appointment to the United States Naval Academy at Annapolis, Maryland. While at the Academy, he was nicknamed "Bob" and was active in the German Class committee. Munroe was also fluent in Portuguese and qualified as interpreter.

Among his classmates were several future admirals including Harry A. Badt, Paul H. Bastedo, John R. Beardall, Abel T. Bidwell, Joseph J. Broshek, Arthur S. Carpender, Jules James, James L. Kauffman, Walter K. Kilpatrick, Thomas C. Kinkaid, Willis A. Lee Jr., William R. Purnell, Francis W. Rockwell, John F. Shafroth Jr. and Richmond K. Turner.

He graduated with Bachelor of Science degree on June 15, 1908, and served as Passed Midshipman aboard battleship USS Maine during the Cuban Pacification. Munroe was promoted to the rank of Ensign on June 6, 1910, after completing two years at sea required then by law. He then commanded the gunboat USS Biddle and later was transferred to the armored cruiser USS North Carolina, operating in the Caribbean and South Atlantic.

In September 1911, Munroe was transferred to the Charleston Navy Yard, South Carolina, where he served on the staff of Reserve Torpedo Division and completed submarine training. He was promoted to Lieutenant (junior grade) on June 6, 1913, and ordered to the Puget Sound Navy Yard for duty in connection with fitting out of submarine USS H-3 three months later. The H-3 was launched and commissioned in January 1914 and Munroe was placed in her command. He then led her during the patrols along the West Coast of the United States with the Pacific Fleet until November 1914, when he was transferred to the Bureau of Steam Engineering in Washington, D.C., where served as an Inspector.

Munroe was promoted to Lieutenant on August 29, 1916, and was ordered back to the Puget Sound Navy Yard, where he had duty in connection with fitting out of coastal submarine USS N-3. Following the United States entry into World War I, he was appointed Commanding officer of that submarine and led her from Puget Sound to Naval Submarine Base New London, Connecticut, arriving in early 1918. Munroe was promoted to the temporary rank of Lieutenant commander on January 1, 1918.

He was then ordered to the Union Iron Works, San Francisco, where he assisted with the fitting out of submarine USS R-17, which was commissioned in mid-August 1918. Munroe then assumed command of the submarine and patrolled off the Panama Canal Zone against possible U-boat attack and returned to San Francisco, California, in February 1919.

== Interwar period ==
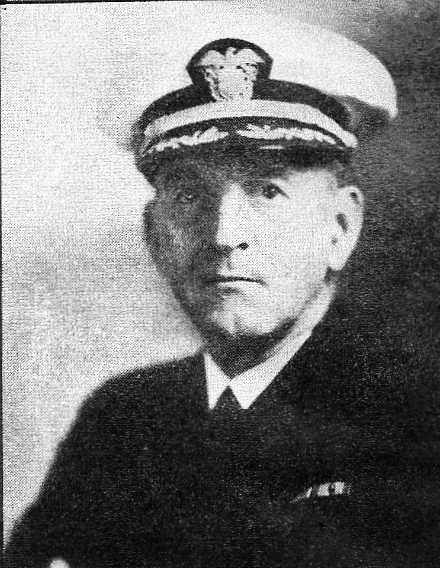
Vice Admiral William R. Munroe in the prewar photo.

Following the war, Munroe was attached to the battleship USS Mississippi, operating with the Pacific Fleet. He was appointed Naval Inspector of Machinery at Naval Submarine Base New London, Connecticut, in May 1921 and served there until December 1922, when he was appointed a member of the Naval Mission to Brazil. Munroe returned to the United States in January 1925 and assumed command of destroyer USS Paul Hamilton. He was promoted to Commander on June 4, 1925.

Munroe served with Paul Hamilton within Pacific Fleet until June 1927, when he was ordered to the Naval War College at Newport, Rhode Island, for senior course. He graduated in June of the following year and joined the War Plans Division in the Office of the Chief of Naval Operations in Washington, D.C. He later served as Naval aide to President Herbert Hoover.

After two years in Washington, Munroe was ordered back to sea duty and was appointed Commander, Submarine Division 11 in June 1930. He was later transferred to command of Submarine Division 8, but returned to Washington, D.C., in July 1932, when he was attached to the Office of Naval Intelligence under Captain Hayne Ellis as his Assistant Director of Naval Intelligence.

In July 1935, Munroe was appointed Commander, Destroyer Division 6, Battle Force and was promoted to Captain on July 1, 1936. His command took part in the patrols in the Pacific ocean and along the West Coast of the United States and Munroe was ordered for instruction to the Army War College at Fort Humphreys in Washington, D.C., in July 1937. He was then ordered back to the Office of the Chief of Naval Operations and remained there until February 1940, when he assumed command of battleship USS Mississippi, where he once served back in 1920. Munroe led Mississippi in the Pacific and the Caribbean patrols and was appointed Commander, Battleship Division 3, Pacific Fleet in January 1941. He led his division, consisting of battleships Mississippi, New Mexico and Idaho within the Neutrality Patrols in the Atlantic Ocean during the ongoing War in Europe.

== World War II ==
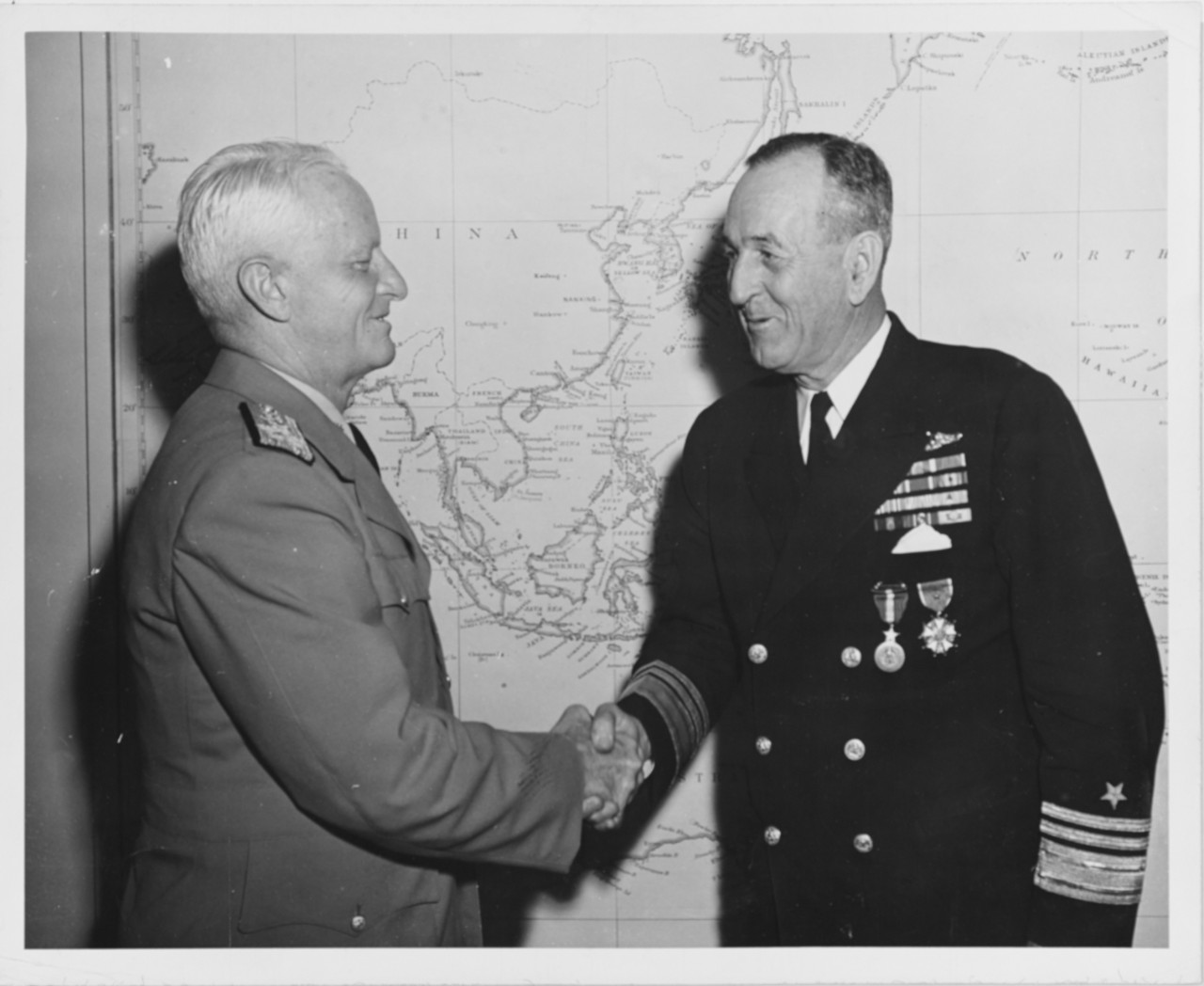
Munroe (right) receives Navy Distinguished Service Medal and his second Legion of Merit from Fleet Admiral Chester Nimitz.

Following the Japanese attack on Pearl Harbor and United States entry into World War II, Munroe was promoted to Rear Admiral on December 8, 1941, and his command continued in the operations in the Atlantic and returned to Pacific in mid-1942. He then conducted patrols between Hawaii and the West Coast of the United States and was transferred to Miami, Florida, in March 1942 for duty as Commander, Gulf Sea Frontier and Seventh Naval District.

While in this capacity, Munroe was responsible for the protection of both coasts of Florida, the Gulf of Mexico, the Yucatan Channel, and most of Cuba and directed antisubmarine campaign against German U-boats penetrating to the Caribbean. He distinguished himself in this capacity and was decorated with Legion of Merit for his service.

Munroe was transferred to New York City by the end of March 1944 and assumed duty as commandant, Third Naval District with responsibility of coastal defense of New York, Connecticut, and New Jersey. He was decorated with second Legion of Merit for his service in New York.

Following his promotion to the temporary rank of Vice Admiral on November 11, 1944, Munroe assumed command of United States Fourth Fleet with additional duty as Commander, South Atlantic Force. While in this capacity, he directed the anti-submarine campaign in the South Atlantic in the last months of World War II. Immediately following the capitulation of Germany, he launched and supervised a program to end the use of many shore facilities of the Navy in South America. Munroe was decorated with Navy Distinguished Service Medal for his service with Fourth Fleet.

By the end of August 1945, Munroe was ordered to San Juan, Puerto Rico, where he held temporary command of Caribbean Sea Frontier for one month, before he was ordered to command of Tenth Naval District with headquarters at Naval Station Great Lakes, Illinois. He held that command until October 1947, when he retired for health reasons after 39 years of active service. For his service in the Caribbean and Miami, Munroe also received foreign decorations from Brazil, Paraguay and Greece.

== Retirement ==
Upon his retirement from the Navy, Munroe worked for the brokerage company Merrill Lynch, Pierce, Fenner & Smith and later joined the Union Oil Company of California. He was also a member of Army and Navy Club in Washington, D.C.; New York Yacht Club; and Naval Order of the United States. Munroe was also awarded an honorary LL.D. by the Baylor University in 1943.

Vice Admiral William R. Munroe died on March 1, 1966, aged 79, at his home in La Jolla, California. He was buried with full military honors at Fort Rosecrans National Cemetery in San Diego. His wife, Katherine Barnewell Johnson, was buried beside him. They had one son, William Robert Munroe Jr., who also served in the Navy and retired with the rank of Commander.

== Decorations ==
Here is the ribbon bar of Vice Admiral Willard R. Munroe:

Submarine Warfare insignia
1st Row	Navy Distinguished Service Medal		
2nd Row	Legion of Merit with one 5/16" Gold Star	Army Commendation Medal	Cuban Pacification Medal
3rd Row	World War I Victory Medal with Fleet Clasp	American Defense Service Medal with "A" Device	Asiatic-Pacific Campaign Medal
4th Row	American Campaign Medal	World War II Victory Medal	Grand Officer of the Order of the Southern Cross (Brazil)
5th Row	Grand Officer of the Order of Naval Merit (Brazil)	National Order of Merit (Paraguay)	Commander of the Order of the Redeemer (Greece)

== See also ==
- USS Mississippi (BB-41)
- Neutrality Patrol

Military offices
Preceded by Robert C. Giffen	Commandant, Tenth Naval District; August 20, 1945 - May 1, 1947	Succeeded by Daniel E. Barbey
Preceded by Jonas H. Ingram	Commander-in-Chief, United States Fourth Fleet; November 1944 - August, 1945	Succeeded by Thomas R. Cooley
Preceded by Edward J. Marquart	Commandant, Third Naval District; March 25, 1944 - November 1, 1944	Succeeded by Monroe Kelly
Preceded by James L. Kauffman	Commandant, Seventh Naval District; April 1, 1943 - March 25, 1944	Succeeded by Walter S. Anderson
