= Richmond K. Turner =

American admiral (1885–1961)

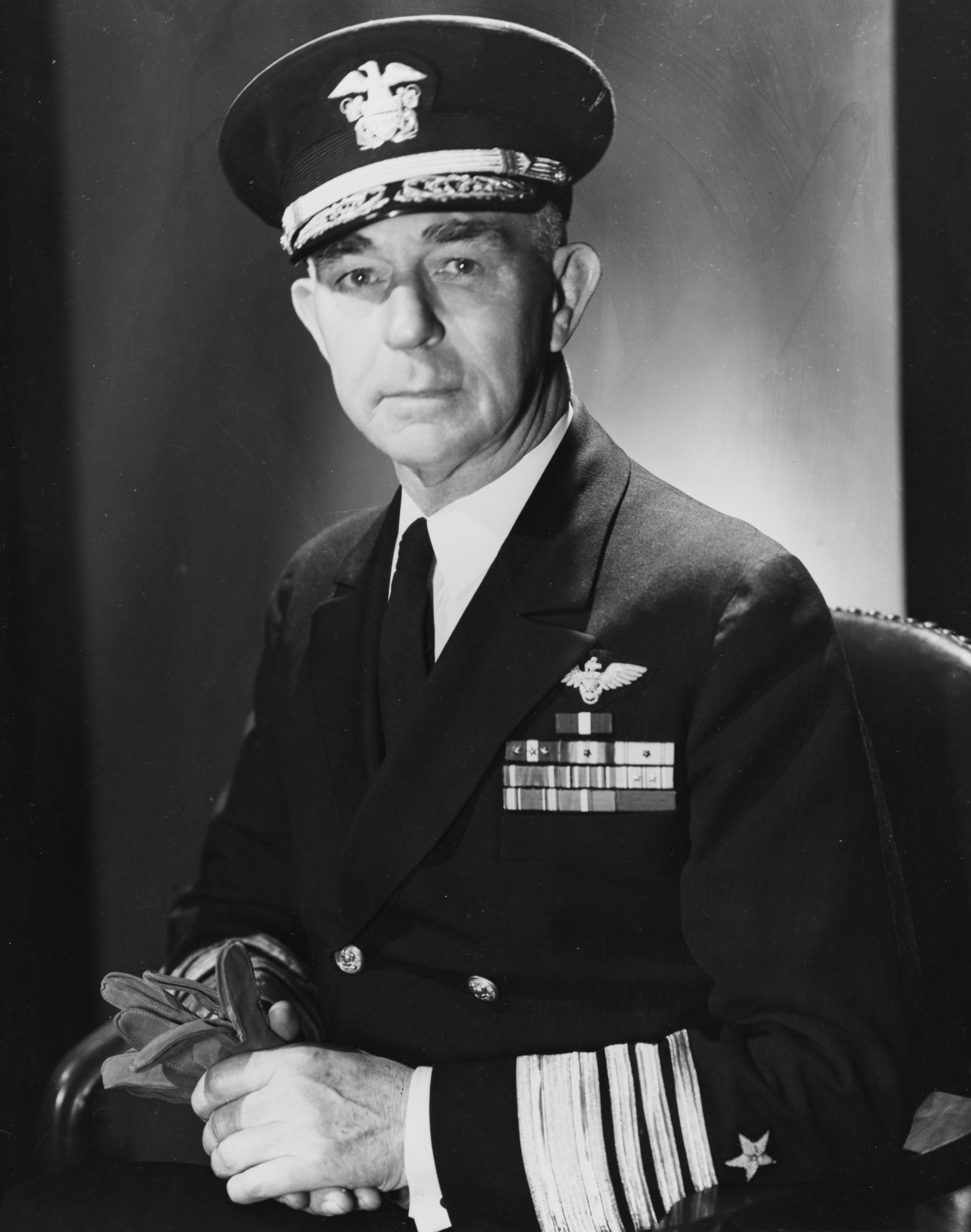
- Born: Richmond Kelly Turner; May 27, 1885; Portland, Oregon, US
- Died: February 12, 1961 (aged 75); Monterey, California, US
- Burial place: Golden Gate National Cemetery; San Bruno, California
- Military career
- Allegiance: United States of America
- Branch: United States Navy
- Service years: 1904–1947
- Rank: Admiral
- Nickname: Fighting Admiral
- Commands: USS Mervine (DD-322); USS Jason (AC-12); Commander Aircraft Squadrons, Asiatic Fleet; USS Saratoga (CV-3); USS Astoria (CA-34); Director of the War Plans Division; Assistant Chief of Staff to the Commander in Chief; Commander, Fifth Amphibious Force; Commander Amphibious Forces, U.S. Pacific Fleet (ComPhibPac)
- Conflicts: World War I; World War II; Guadalcanal campaign; Battle of Savo Island; Solomon Islands campaign; Mariana and Palau Islands campaign
- Awards: Navy Cross; Navy Distinguished Service Medal (4); Army Distinguished Service Medal; Order of the Sacred Treasure, 3rd Class

Admiral Richmond Kelly Turner (May 27, 1885 – February 12, 1961), commonly known as Kelly Turner, was an admiral of the United States Navy during the Second World War, where he commanded the Amphibious Force in the Pacific theater. Turner was also responsible for the creation of the Underwater Demolition Teams (UDT) in 1942 that were an early precursor to the United States Navy SEALs.

== Early life and career ==
Richmond Turner was born in Portland, Oregon on May 27, 1885, to Enoch and Laura Frances (née Kelly) Turner. His father alternated between being a rancher and farmer, and working as a printer in both Portland (for The Oregonian with his older brother Thomas) and Stockton, California (where he owned a small print shop). The young Richmond spent most of his childhood in and around Stockton, with a brief stop in Santa Ana, and he graduated from Stockton High School in 1904.

He was appointed to the Naval Academy from California's sixth district, his name put forward by Congressman James C. Needham, in 1904. He graduated on June 5, 1908 and served in several ships over the next four years. Among his classmates were several future admirals including: Harry A. Badt, Paul H. Bastedo, John R. Beardall, Abel T. Bidwell, Joseph J. Broshek, Arthur S. Carpender, Jules James, Walter K. Kilpatrick, James L. Kauffman, Thomas C. Kinkaid, Willis A. Lee Jr., William R. Munroe, William R. Purnell, Francis W. Rockwell, and John F. Shafroth Jr.

On August 3, 1910, he married Harriet "Hattie" Sterling in Stockton.

In 1913, Lieutenant (Junior Grade) Turner briefly held command of the destroyer USS Stewart. After receiving instruction in ordnance engineering and serving on board the gunboat Marietta, he was assigned to the battleships Pennsylvania, Michigan and Mississippi during 1916–19. From 1919 to 1922, Lieutenant Commander Turner was an ordnance officer at the Naval Gun Factory in Washington, D.C. He then was gunnery officer of the battleship California, fleet gunnery officer on the Staff of Commander Scouting Fleet and commanding officer of the destroyer Mervine.

After his promotion to the rank of commander in 1925, Turner served with the Bureau of Ordnance at the Navy Department. In 1927, he received flight training at Pensacola, Florida, was designated as a naval aviator, and a year later became commanding officer of the seaplane tender Jason and commander, Aircraft Squadrons, Asiatic Fleet. He had further aviation-related assignments into the 1930s and was executive officer of the aircraft carrier Saratoga in 1933–34. Captain Turner attended the Naval War College and served on that institution's staff in 1935–38 as head of the Strategy faculty.

Turner's last single ship command was the heavy cruiser Astoria, on a diplomatic mission to Japan in 1939. During his service with that vessel, Astoria, the body of deceased Japanese Ambassador to the United States, Hiroshi Saito, was returned to Japan. Saito died of tuberculosis in February 1939. Following World War II, Turner received Order of the Sacred Treasure, 3rd Class by the Emperor of Japan.

Turner was Director of War Plans in Washington, D.C., in 1940–41 and was promoted to rear admiral January 1941.

== Responsibility for Pearl Harbor ==
As Director of War Plans in the office of Chief of Naval Operations, Captain Turner became the Naval Member of the Joint Planning Committee of the Joint Board. Turner and Colonel Joseph T. McNarney, Air Corps, U.S. Army wrote "Study of the Immediate Problems concerning Involvement in War" in late December 1940. This led to Plan D, a strong offensive war in the Atlantic and a defensive war in the Pacific. This evolved into U.S. war plan "Rainbow Five".

On November 25, 1941, Turner drafted a dispatch to the Commander in Chief of the Asiatic Fleet for release by the Chief of Naval Operations (CNO), which contained the words: "I consider it probable that this next Japanese aggression may cause an outbreak of hostilities between the U.S. and Japan." CNO Admiral Harold Rainsford Stark took this message to President Roosevelt, who in relaying it to his High Commissioner to the Philippines softened the judgment words "probable" to "possible" and "may" to "might." Roosevelt also added the bad guess: "Advance against Thailand seems the most probable."

The Commander of the U.S. Pacific Fleet, Admiral Husband E. Kimmel, was highly aware of the threat of surprise Japanese attack at Pearl Harbor. The final and most important warning was sent from Washington to Pearl Harbor and other Pacific outposts on November 27, 1941. It was specifically designated as a "war warning."

Turner made the decision not to send Kimmel details of the intercepted Japanese diplomatic communications although they pointed strongly to an imminent air or sea attack on the Pacific Fleet's base at Pearl Harbor. Kimmel testified after the war that had he known of these communications, he would have maintained a much higher level of alert, and the fleet would not have been taken by surprise by the Japanese attack. As historian of the attack on Pearl Harbor, Professor Gordon Prange, wrote in Pearl Harbor: The Verdict of History that was correct, even allowing for Kimmel's desire to exculpate himself: "If Turner thought a Japanese raid on Hawaii ... to be a 50-percent chance, it was his clear duty to say so plainly in his directive to Kimmel ... He won the battle for dominance of War Plans over Intelligence, and had to abide by the consequences. If his estimates had enabled the U.S. to fend off ... the Japanese threat at Pearl Harbor, Turner would deserve the appreciation of a grateful nation. By the same token, he could not justly avoid his share of the blame for failure."

Vice Admiral Homer N. Wallin wrote a much more comprehensive analysis of the reasons for the U.S. defeat at Pearl Harbor. See also Rear Admiral Edwin T. Layton, Kimmel's chief intelligence officer, and his book, And I Was There. "To anyone who is familiar with the mutinous conditions provoked by Turner's interference in the intelligence process . . .throughout 1941, (Turner's) barefaced denial of any responsibility for its consequences was as outrageous as it was untrue." Page 142.

Admiral Turner testified to the Roberts Commission on January 19, 1942, the Admiral Thomas C. Hart Inquiry on the April 3rd and 4th, 1944, the Navy Court of Inquiry headed by Admiral Orin G. Murfin on September 15, 1944 and the Joint Congressional Committee Investigating Pearl Harbor in 1946.

== World War II ==
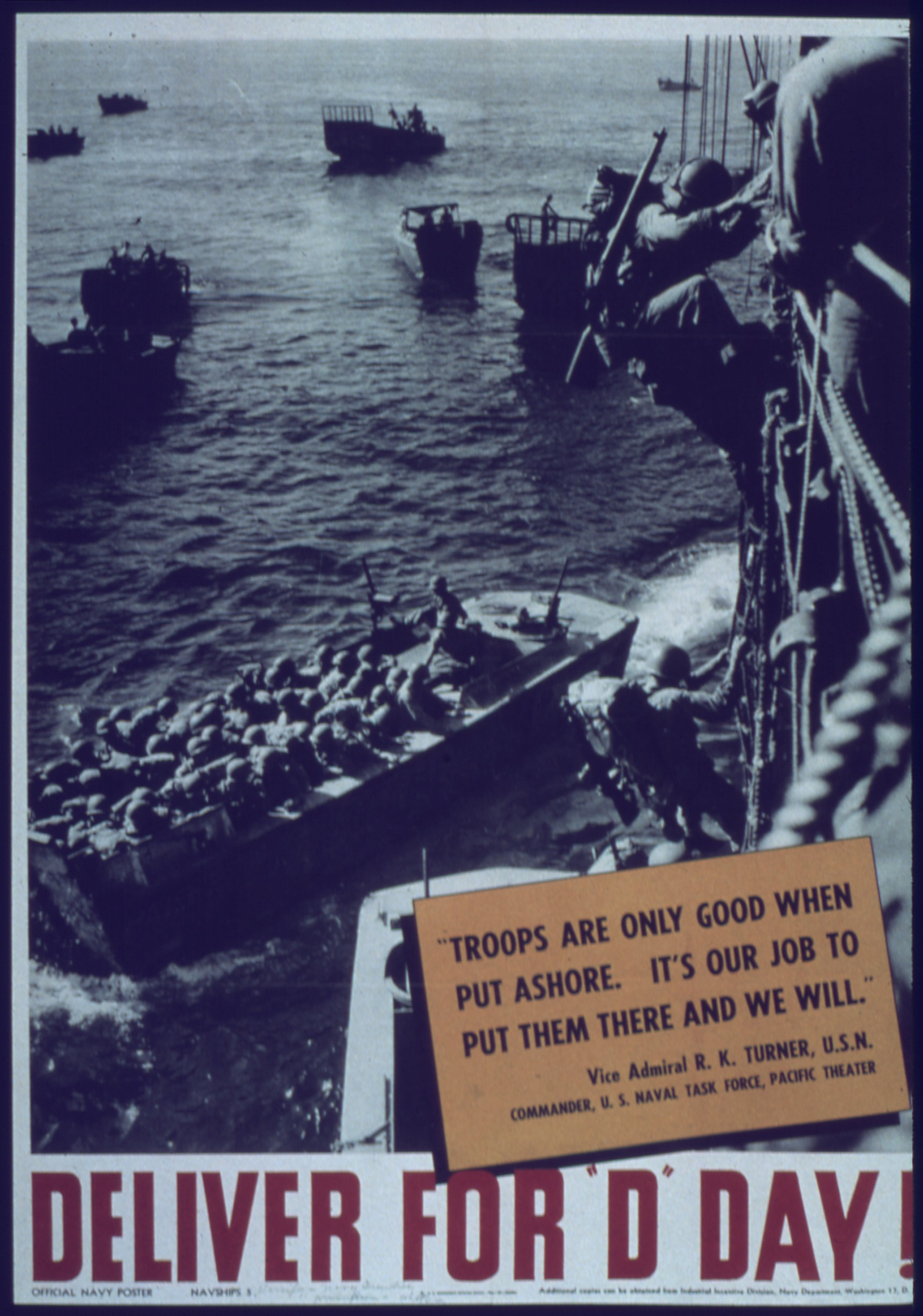
Quote,"Deliver for D-Day!"

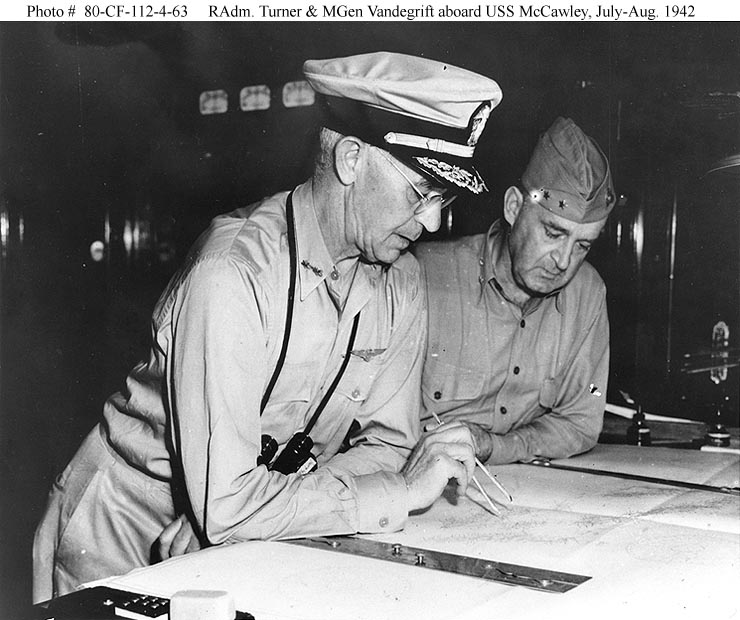
Turner with Marine Corps Major General Vandegrift during the planning of Operation Watchtower in July–August 1942.

In December 1941, Turner was appointed assistant chief of staff to the Commander in Chief, United States Fleet (a new position created after Pearl Harbor for Admiral Ernest King) and served until June 1942. He was then sent to the Pacific to take command of the Amphibious Force, South Pacific Force. Over the next three years, he held a variety of senior Amphibious Force commands as a rear admiral and vice admiral. He helped plan and execute amphibious operations against enemy positions in the south, central and western Pacific. He would have commanded the amphibious component of the invasion of Japan.

For the Guadalcanal campaign, Rear Admiral Turner was Commander, Amphibious Force South Pacific (ComPhibForSoPac), also known as Task Force 62 which included 9 Groups, including Landing Force, Marine Corps Major General Alexander Vandegrift and Screening Group, Rear Admiral Victor Crutchley, Royal Navy. He successfully fought the five-month campaign to victory which included the galling defeat at Savo Island.

For the assault on the Russell Islands, Rear Admiral Turner, ComPhibForSoPac, was named as the Commander of the Joint Force designated Task Force 61, with the Commanding General 43rd Infantry Division, Major General John H. Hester, U.S. Army, being the Commander Landing Force. For the assault on the New Georgia Groups of Islands, Rear Admiral Turner, ComPhibForSoPac, was named as the Commander Task Force 31 which included New Georgia Occupation Force, Major General Hester.

For the assault on Tarawa and Makin, Rear Admiral Turner was named as the Commander, Assault Force Task Force 51, which included 10 Groups, including Northern Attack Force for Makin and Southern Attack Force for Tarawa, Rear Admiral Harry W. Hill.

At Tarawa: "Rear Admiral Turner, the Task Force Commander and Immediate Senior in Command, was well over the horizon and busy with the problems of Makin. Vice Admiral Spruance, the Commander Central Pacific Force, was present at Tarawa in the Indianapolis, but with that quality which endeared him to all his subordinates, did not undertake to kibitz on the minute-by-minute performance of the local Task Force or Task Group Commanders. To Rear Admiral Harry Hill belongs full credit for a great and hard-fought victory at Tarawa."

For the assault on the Marshall Islands, Roi-Namur and Kwajalein, Rear Admiral Turner was the Commander, Joint Expeditionary Force, Task Force 51, which included 3 Task Forces and 9 Task Groups.

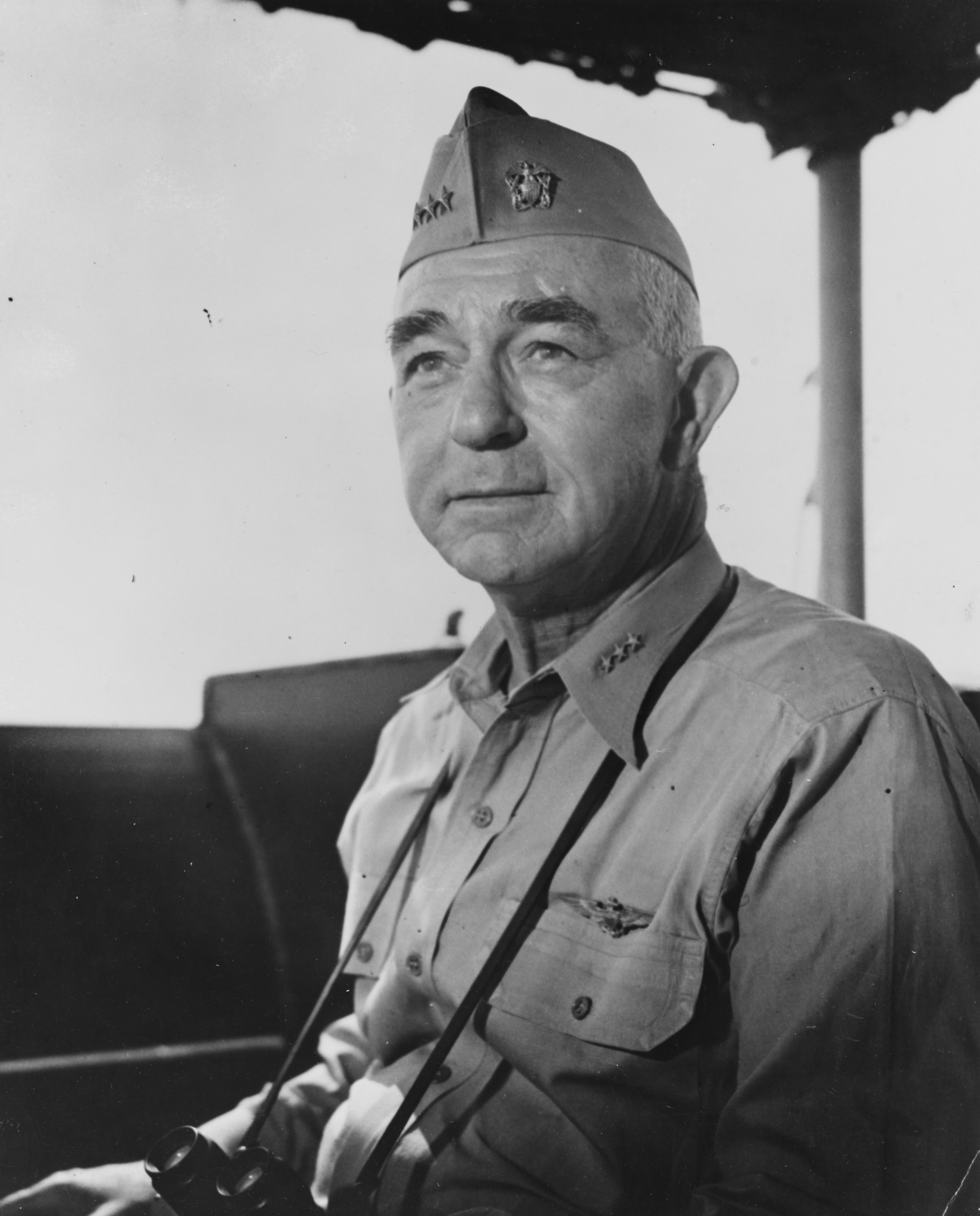
Vice Admiral Turner

As a result of his leadership in those many amphibious assaults, Turner was promoted to vice admiral on March 7, 1944.

For the assaults on Tinian, Guam and Saipan, Vice Admiral Turner was the Commander, Joint Expeditionary Force, Task Force 51, which included the Northern and Southern Task Forces, Expeditionary Task Force, Lt. General Holland Smith and 6 Task Groups.

For the assault on Iwo Jima, Vice Admiral Turner was the Commander, Joint Expeditionary Force, Task Force 50, which included the Attack Force, Rear Admiral Hill, and Expeditionary Task Force, Lt. General Smith. For both the Iwo Jima and Okinawa operations, Turner commanded from his flagship Eldorado, which served as his amphibious force command ship. Calvin John Pancheri, Yeoman 3rd Class, USNR, of Norway, Michigan, served as a yeoman aboard Eldorado during these campaigns; he was later interred with full military honors at Miramar National Cemetery, San Diego.

At the Battle of Okinawa Turner commanded Task Force 51 which included the Northern Attack Force, Rear Admiral Lawrence Fairfax Reifsnider, the Southern Attack Force, Rear Admiral Hill, Expeditionary Troops, Lt. General Simon Bolivar Buckner Jr., Western Island Attack Group, Rear Admiral Ingolf N. Kiland, Amphibious Support Force Rear Admiral William H. P. Blandy and Gunfire and Covering Force, Rear Admiral Morton Deyo. At the end of the Battle of Okinawa the Amphibious Forces under Admiral Turner's command were manned by 657,000 officers and men.

On May 24, 1945, Richmond Kelly Turner was promoted to full admiral. Had the Pacific war continued, he would have commanded the amphibious component of the invasion of Japan. Under Admiral Turner's command, there were to be 2,700 ships and craft in the Kyushu operation. There had been 1,213 ships and craft under his command for the Okinawa operation, 435 for the Marianas operation and 51 at Guadalcanal.

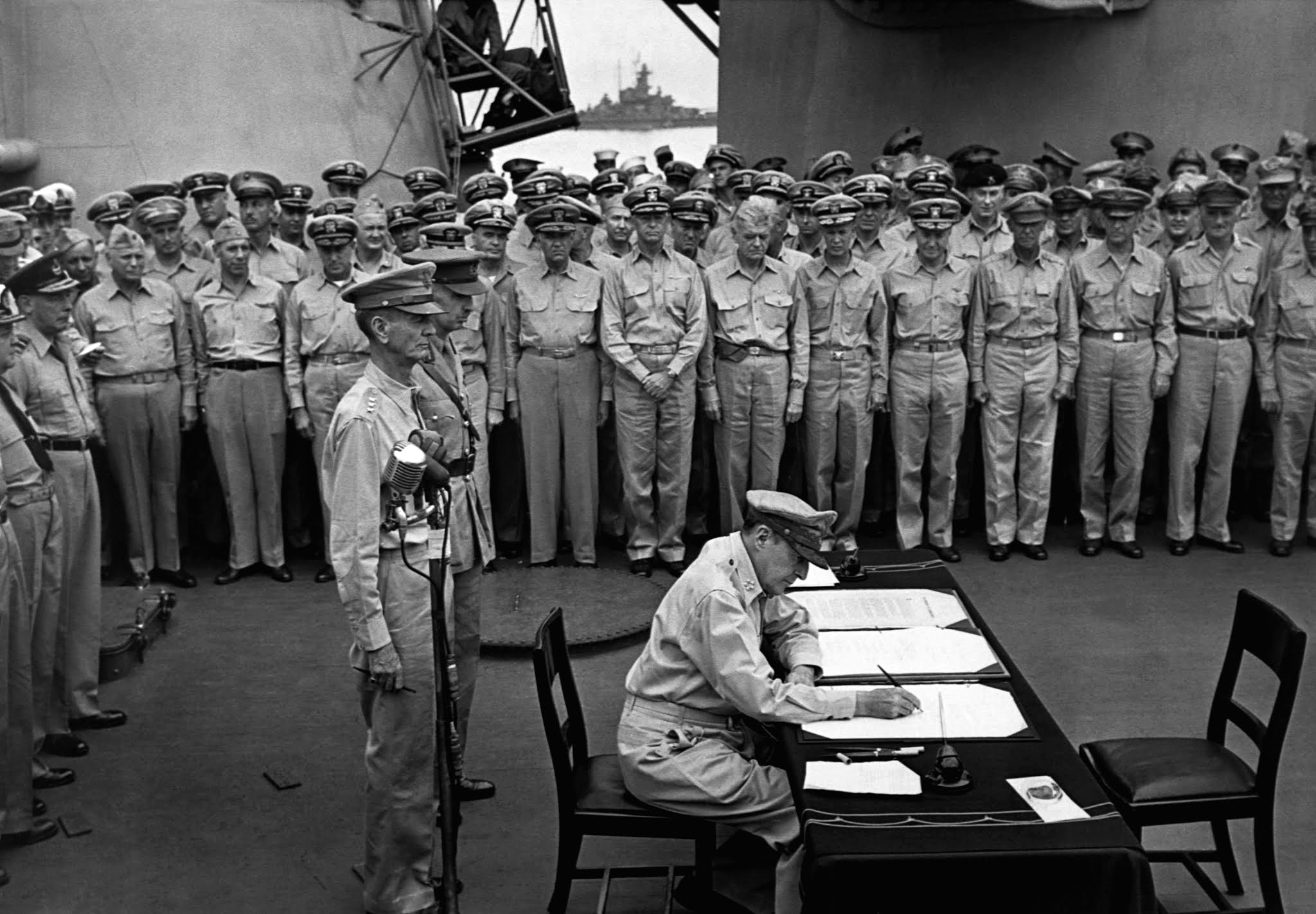
General Douglas MacArthur signs as Supreme Allied Commander during formal surrender ceremonies on the USS Missouri in Tokyo Bay. Behind General MacArthur are Lieutenant General Jonathan Wainwright and Lieutenant General Arthur Percival. Admiral Turner (hands folded) is standing in the row of officers. To his right is Admiral John Henry Towers and to his left is Admiral William Halsey.

Turner was present during the Japanese surrender on board the USS Missouri on September 2, 1945.

== Later life ==
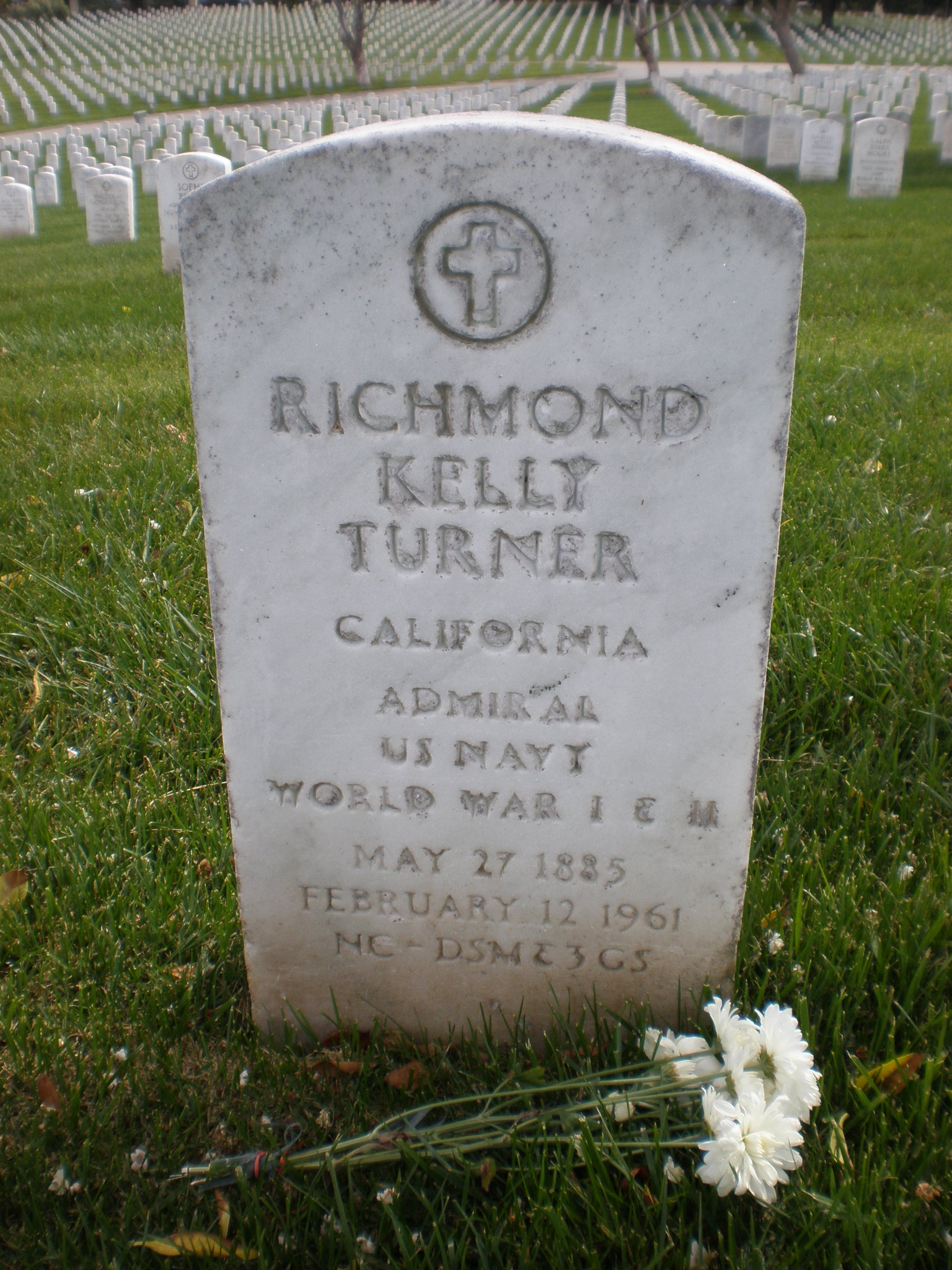
Turner's headstone at Golden Gate National Cemetery

After World War II, Admiral Turner served on the Navy Department's General Board and was U.S. Naval Representative on the United Nations Military Staff Committee. He retired from active duty in July 1947.

Admiral Turner died in Monterey, California, on February 12, 1961. He is buried in Golden Gate National Cemetery in San Bruno, California, alongside his wife and Admirals Chester Nimitz, Raymond A. Spruance, and Charles A. Lockwood, an arrangement made by all of them while living.

== Personal life ==
He was the brother of the socialist and pacifist writer John Kenneth Turner.

== Awards ==

Naval Aviator Badge
1st Row	Navy Cross	Navy Distinguished Service Medal with three Gold Stars	Army Distinguished Service Medal
2nd Row	Navy Unit Commendation	World War I Victory Medal with "ATLANTIC FLEET" clasp	American Defense Service Medal with "FLEET" clasp
3rd Row	American Campaign Medal	Asiatic Pacific Campaign Medal with two silver 3/16 inch service stars	World War II Victory Medal
4th Row	Philippine Liberation Medal	Companion of the Order of the Bath (United Kingdom)	Order of the Sacred Treasure, 3rd Class (Japan)

== Legacy ==
=== Personality ===
Admiral Turner was known for his complicated personality and furious temper. Nicknamed "Terrible Turner," many of his subordinates and colleagues recognized his command abilities, but on the other hand criticized his manners, heavy drinking and pedantry. When Admiral Chester Nimitz accepted Turner as commander of his assault force, Nimitz dryly said of the assignment that Turner was "brilliant, caustic, arrogant, and tactless – just the man for the job".

Future Marine general Robert E. Hogaboom, who served as his assistant chief of staff for operations, describes him as:

The greatness of Admiral Kelly Turner was in that Kelly Turner worked his plans out in minute detail himself, right down to the last position of every amphibious vessel; where they would be, when they should be there, what they were to do. I knew him personally and I know that he was a fighting man. He was tough ... he was not always fair, but he insisted on his people doing what they were supposed to do.

General Nathan Twining, who served as chief of staff of the Allied air forces in South Pacific during World War II, described Turner as:

A loud, strident, arrogant person who enjoyed settling all matters by simply raising his voice and roaring like a bull captain in the old navy. ... [His] peers understood this and valued him for what he was, a good and determined leader with a fine mind – when he chose to use it.

=== Honors and depictions ===
The Leahy-class destroyer leader (later classified guided missile cruiser) USS Richmond K. Turner (DLG-20/CG-20) in service from 1964 to 1995 was named in honor of Admiral Turner.

Turner appears in To the Shores of Iwo Jima, a documentary short film depicting the American assault on the Japanese-held island of Iwo Jima and the massive battle that raged on that key island in the Allied advance on Japan.

Turner was portrayed by actor Stuart Randall in the film The Gallant Hours.

== See also ==
- Guadalcanal campaign, first major amphibious operation
