= James L. Kauffman =

United States Navy officer

James Laurence Kauffman
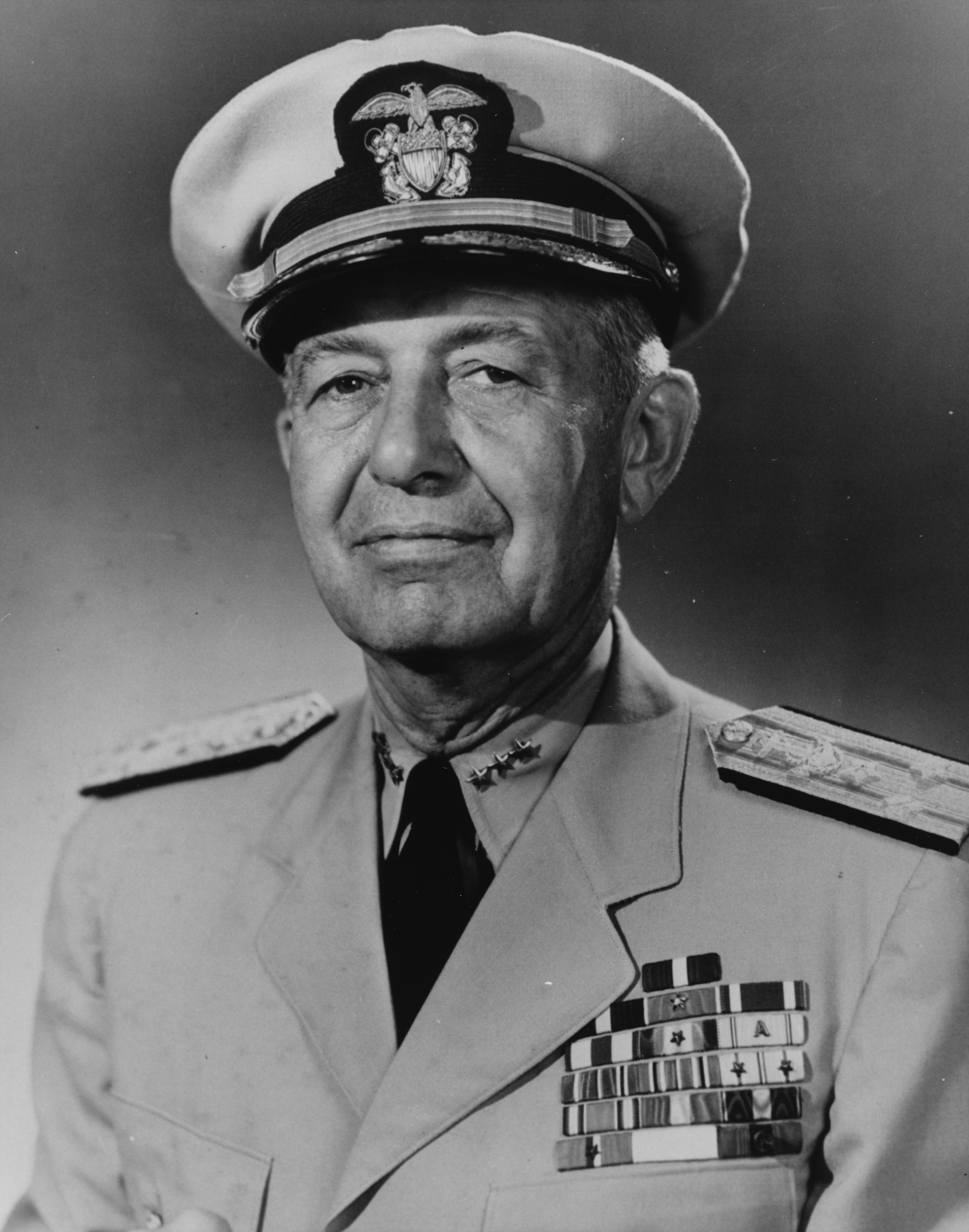
- Born: 18 April 1887; Miamisburg, Ohio, US
- Died: 21 October 1963 (aged 76); Bethesda, Maryland, US
- Burial place: United States Naval Academy Cemetery
- Relatives: RADM Draper Kauffman (son)
- Military career
- Allegiance: United States of America
- Branch: United States Navy
- Service years: 1908 – 1949
- Rank: Vice Admiral
- Commands: Fourth Naval District; Philippine Sea Frontier; Gulf Sea Frontier; COMDESPAC; Destroyer Squadron 7 USS Rainier; USS Jenkins (DD-42); USS Barney (DD-149); USS Memphis (CL-13)
- Conflicts: Veracruz Expedition; World War I; Battle of the Atlantic; World War II; Battle of Tarawa; Battle of Kwajalein; Battle of Leyte Gulf
- Awards: Navy Cross; Distinguished Service Medal; Legion of Merit (2); Navy Commendation Medal

James Laurence Kauffman (18 April 1887 – 21 October 1963) was a highly decorated officer in the United States Navy with the rank of vice admiral. He distinguished himself as commanding officer of destroyer USS Jenkins (DD-42) during World War I and received the Navy Cross, the United States second-highest decoration awarded for valor in combat.

Kauffman rose to flag rank during World War II and held several important assignments in both European and Pacific theaters. He retired as Commandant Fourth Naval District with headquarters in Philadelphia in 1949. His son, Draper Kauffman, also served in the Navy and retired as rear admiral in the 1970s. They were both the namesakes of USS Kauffman (FFG-59).

== Early career ==
James L. Kauffman was born on 18 April 1887 in Miamisburg, Ohio, the son of John A. Kauffman and Laura Hunt. He attended public school in Miamisburg and graduated from the Steele High School in Dayton, Ohio. Kauffman then attended Pennsylvania Military College in Chester, Pennsylvania for one year, before receiving an appointment to the United States Naval Academy at Annapolis, Maryland on 29 June 1904. While at the academy, he reached the rank of cadet ensign and was nicknamed "Reggie" by his classmates.

Among his classmates were several future admirals including: Harry A. Badt, John R. Beardall, Arthur S. Carpender, Jules James, Thomas C. Kinkaid, Willis A. Lee Jr., William R. Munroe, William R. Purnell, Francis W. Rockwell, John F. Shafroth Jr. and Richmond K. Turner.

He graduated with a Bachelor of Science degree on 15 June 1908 and served successively as passed midshipman aboard the protected cruiser USS Milwaukee and armored cruiser USS Tennessee with the Pacific Fleet. While aboard Tennessee Kauffman visited the Philippines, China, and Japan and returned to the United States in March 1910.

Kauffman was assigned to the destroyer USS Hopkins under Lieutenant Harold G. Bowen, stationed at Mare Island Navy Yard following a boiler explosion. He was commissioned ensign on 6 June 1910, after completing two years of service at sea then required by law. After a period of Hopkins repairs and service with the Reserve Fleet, he was appointed commanding officer of the Hopkins in November 1912. Kauffman was promoted to lieutenant (junior grade) on 6 June 1913 and commanded his ship until January 1914, when he was relieved by a new commanding officer more senior in rank and transferred to the capacity of ship's executive officer. He participated with the Hopkins in the naval operations in Mexican waters during the Veracruz Expedition in summer 1914 and was detached in November that year.

He was subsequently ordered to the Engineering Experiment Station at the Naval Academy, where he assumed duty as Assistant Manager. Kauffman participated in the testing of gasoline motors and other experimental work in the development of aviation and was promoted to lieutenant on 29 August 1916. He was transferred to the battleship USS Texas at New York Navy Yard in November 1916 and served aboard that ship until March the following year, when he was transferred to the receiving ship at Norfolk Navy Yard.

== World War I ==
Following the United States' entry into World War I, Kauffman was assigned to the transport ship USS Tenadores and served as the ship's executive officer during her first wartime voyage with the troops and supplies to Europe. He was detached one month later and returned to the United States for service as commanding officer of USS Rainier in July 1917 at Mare Island Navy Yard, California. The Rainer was originally a civilian schooner and Kauffman commanded that vessel just for one month, before returning to Mare Island for duty in connection with the fitting out of newly commissioned destroyer, USS Caldwell, under Lieutenant Commander Byron McCandless.

Kauffman served as executive officer under McCandless and sailed again to the European waters, where he took part in the anti-submarine patrols off the coast of Queenstown, Ireland. He was promoted to the temporary rank of lieutenant commander on 1 January 1918 and assumed command of destroyer USS Jenkins in June that year. Kauffman engaged in the exacting and hazardous duty of patrolling the waters infested with enemy submarines and mines, and escorting and protecting convoys of troops and supplies.

For his service with destroyer Jenkins, Kauffman was decorated with the Navy Cross, the United States second-highest decoration awarded for valor in combat. He was also appointed Officer of the Order of Leopold II by the King of Belgium, Albert I.

== Interwar period ==
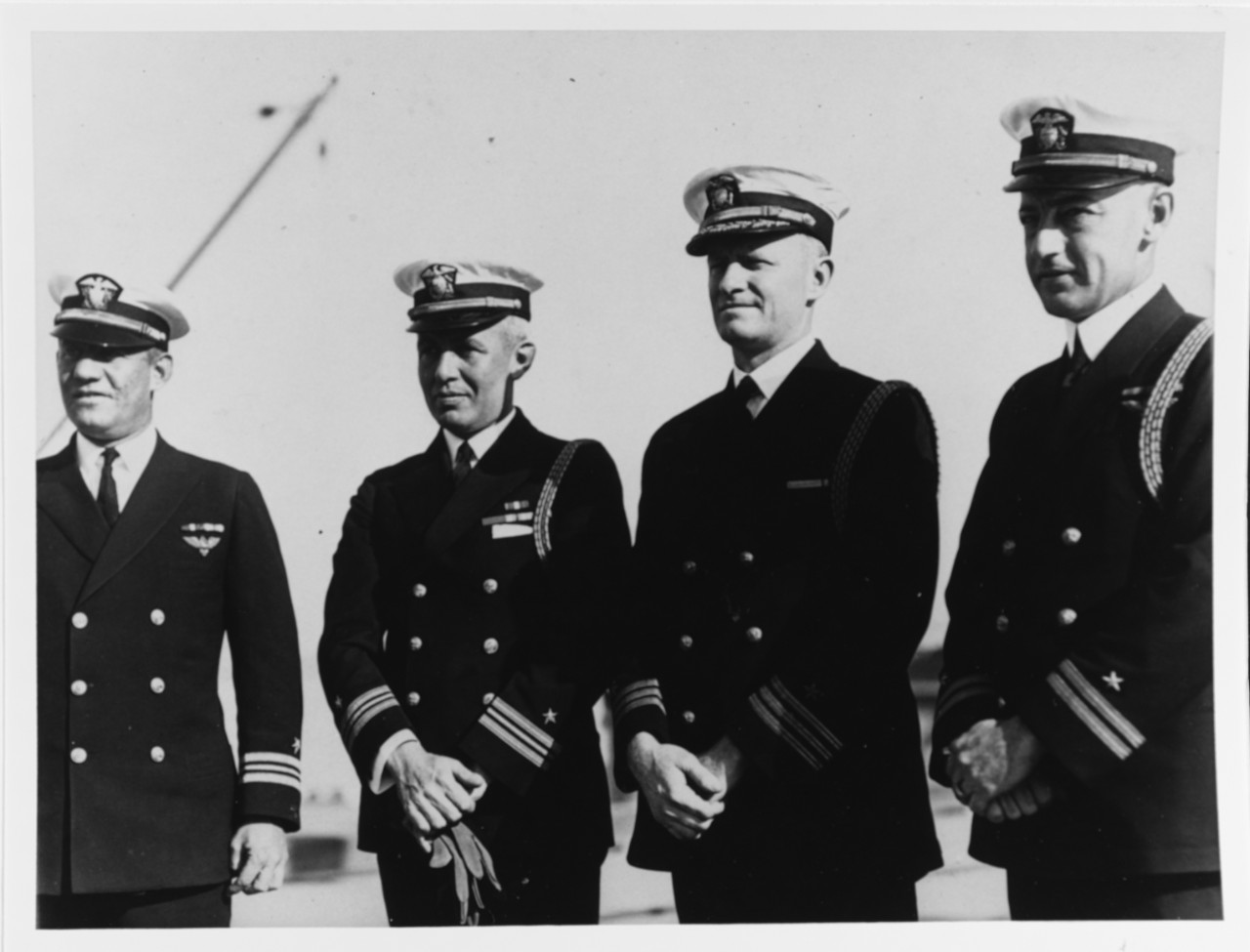
Staff at Naval Air Station, San Diego, California, November 1923. Kauffman (second from left), served as aide and flag secretary to Admiral Samuel S. Robison. Future admiral Chester Nimitz is second from right.

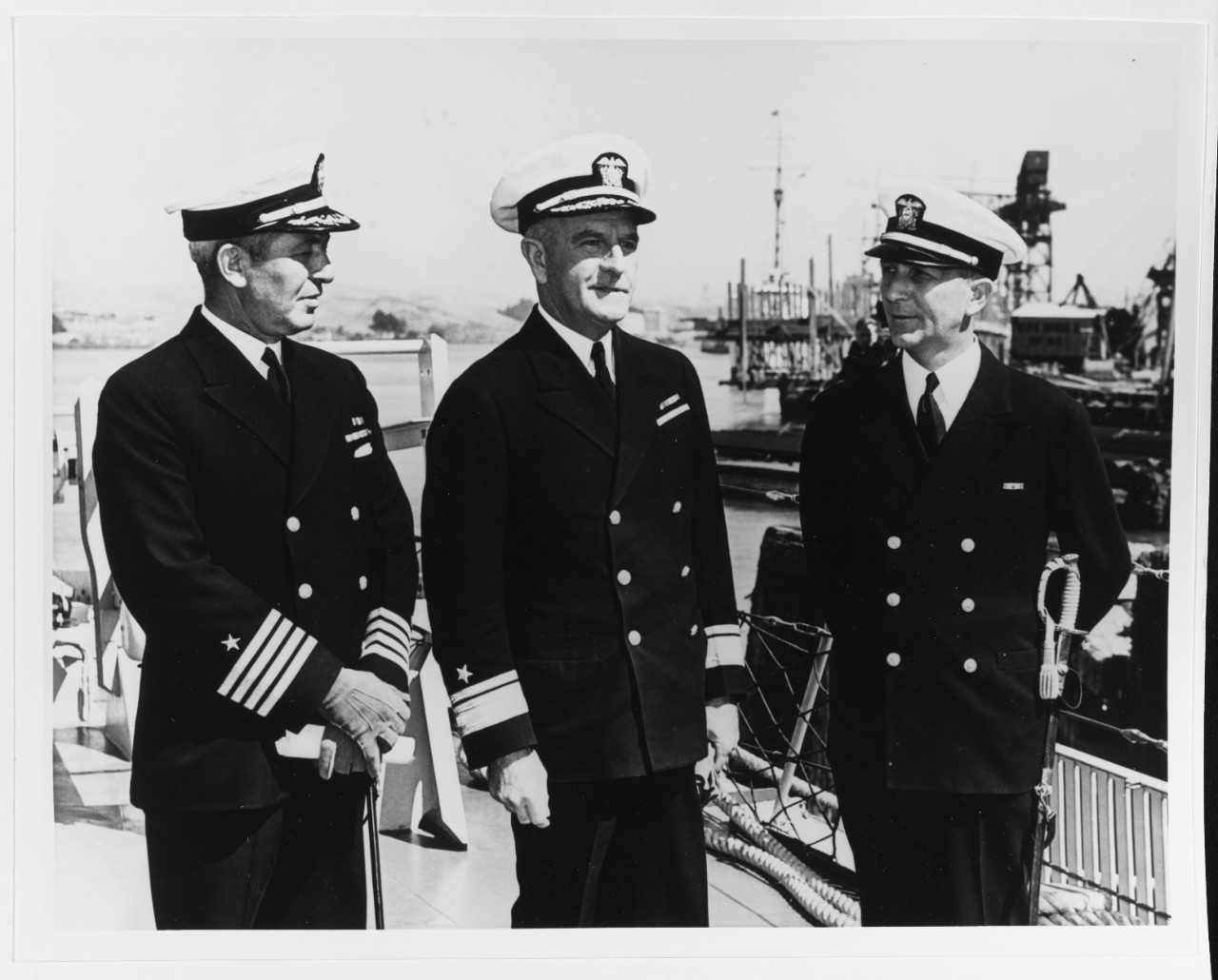
Commissioning ceremony of destroyer USS McCall at Mare Island Navy Yard in June 1938. Kauffman (left) with Rear Admiral David W. Bagley (center), Commandant of the Yard and Lieutenant Commander John Whelchel, commanding officer of McCall.

Upon the Armistice, Kauffman returned to the United States in March 1919 and assumed command of newly commissioned destroyer USS Barney at Philadelphia Navy Yard. He commanded his ship during the voyage with the Atlantic Fleet to Istanbul, Turkey, where he witnessed the collapse of the Ottoman Empire. Kauffman then conducted patrol cruises along the Atlantic coast of the United States and later in the Caribbean, before he was ordered to Washington, D.C. for duty at the Bureau of Engineering in January 1921.

Kauffman served in the Engineering's Radio Division until June 1923, when he assumed duty as Aide and Flag Secretary on the staff of Admiral Samuel S. Robison, Commander-in-Chief, Battle Fleet. While in this capacity, he was promoted to Commander on 4 June 1925. Kauffman was transferred to the Office of Naval Intelligence in February 1927 and joined the U.S. Naval Mission to Brazil, where he had duty in connection with that navy's destroyers until the end of January 1931.

Following his tour of duty in South America, Kauffman was assigned to his World War I battleship USS Texas, and assumed duty as navigator under Captain Julius C. Townsend. He took part in the visit of the Panama Canal and was promoted to capacity of ship's executive officer in April 1931. Kauffman then took part in the patrol cruises with the Pacific Fleet and was ordered to the Naval War College at Newport, Rhode Island in June 1933.

Upon graduation in May 1934, Kauffman assumed duty as executive officer of the Naval Station Newport under Captain Herbert C. Cocke until 30 June 1936, when he was promoted to captain and assumed command of light cruiser USS Memphis. He commanded his ship during the good will cruise to the Caribbean and later took part in the operations with the Pacific Fleet.

In January 1938, Kauffman was appointed Commandant of the Mare Island Navy Yard, California, where he oversaw constructions and repairs of many ships and submarines including USS Fulton, USS Tuna and USS Gudgeon. He remained at Mare Island until January 1940, when he was appointed commander of Destroyer Squadron 36 located at San Diego, California. Kauffman was transferred to command of Destroyer Squadron 7 in December 1940.

== World War II ==
=== Service in Atlantic ===
With the outbreak of the World War II, Kauffman assumed additional duty as Commander Destroyers, Support Force, Atlantic Fleet and participated in convoying troops and ships to Newfoundland and Iceland during intensive U-Boot activity from March to September 1941. For his service in this capacity, he received a letter of commendation from Secretary of the Navy Frank Knox.

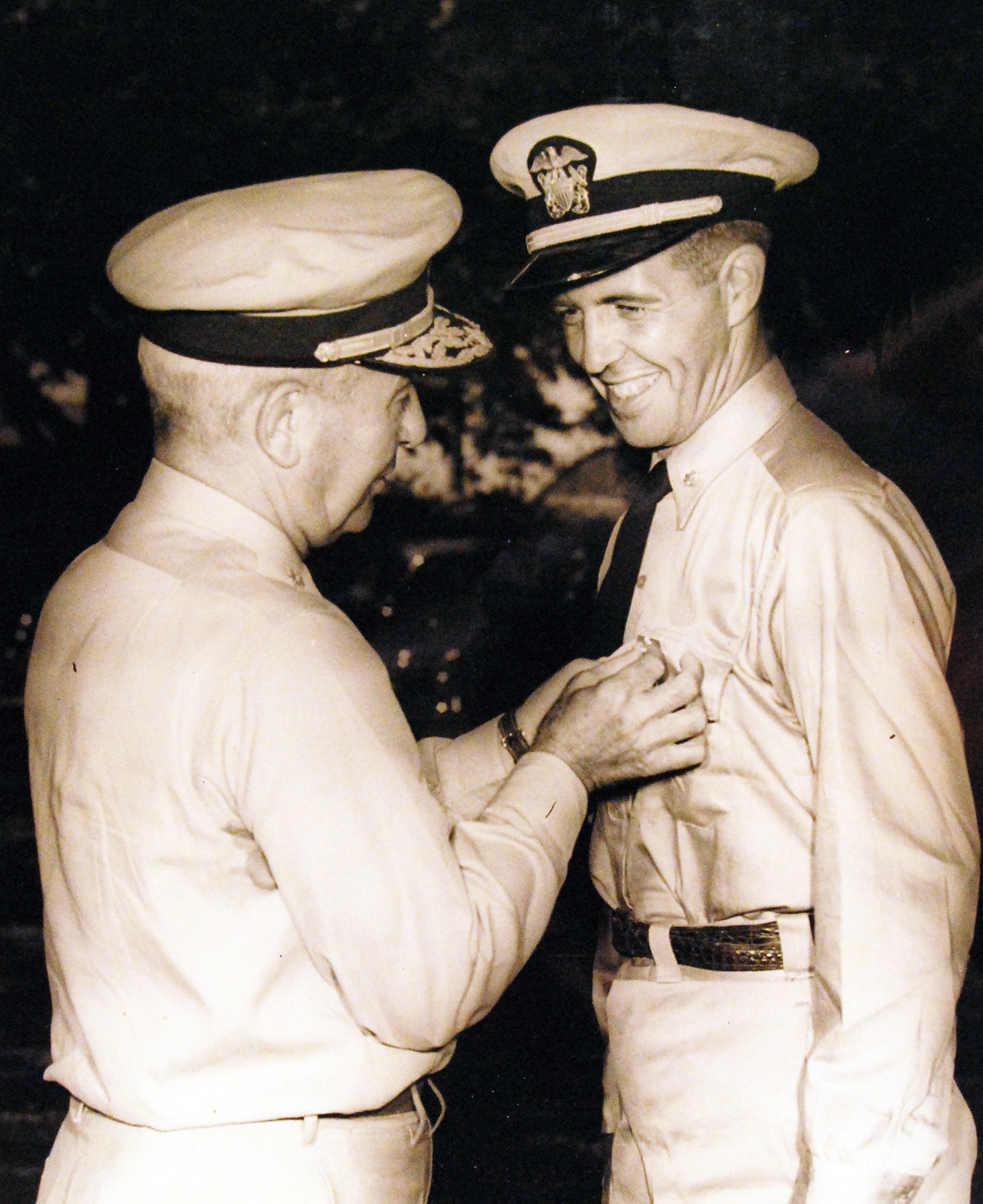
Kauffman (left) presents his son Draper L. Kauffman with a Gold Star in lieu of second Navy Cross for heroism under fire during the U.S. invasion of the Mariana Islands, 1 September 1944.

Kauffman was promoted to rear admiral on 1 November 1941 and appointed a member of the General Board of the Navy in Washington. He was detached from this post on 7 December, only one day after Japanese attack on Pearl Harbor and ordered to Iceland, where he was tasked with the establishing of Naval Operating Base Iceland at Hvalfjörður to ensure Nazi Germany would not seize that country.

He arrived to Iceland few days later aboard battleship USS Arkansas and became the Commandant of that base. There were no quarters ashore for him nor his staff and Kauffman transferred his flag to gunboat USS Williamsburg to make more space for receiving ship and provided quarters for the Army's port authority. He moved his staff ashore, when the naval facility known as Camp Knox was completed in May 1942. For his service in this capacity, Kauffman was later decorated with Order of the Falcon by the Government of Iceland.

In June 1942, Kauffman was transferred to Key West, Florida, where he assumed duty as Commandant of the Seventh Naval District and Commander Gulf Sea Frontier. he was responsible for the Allied effort to fight German U-boats in the area stretching from Jacksonville, Florida, to the Mexican coast, including the entire Gulf of Mexico and its strategic entrances. He served in this capacity until February 1943 and received Legion of Merit for his service against German submarines. Kauffman also received Cuban Order of Military Merit, and Order of the Southern Cross and Navy War Service Medal by the Government of Brazil.

Kauffman was subsequently ordered to Washington, D.C. and joined the headquarters of United States Fleet under Admiral Ernest J. King as the senior member of the Allied Antisubmarine Board. While in this capacity, he took part in the inspections of the Allied antisubmarine air and ship stations on both sides of the Atlantic and was stationed as an observer in London, England for a brief period.

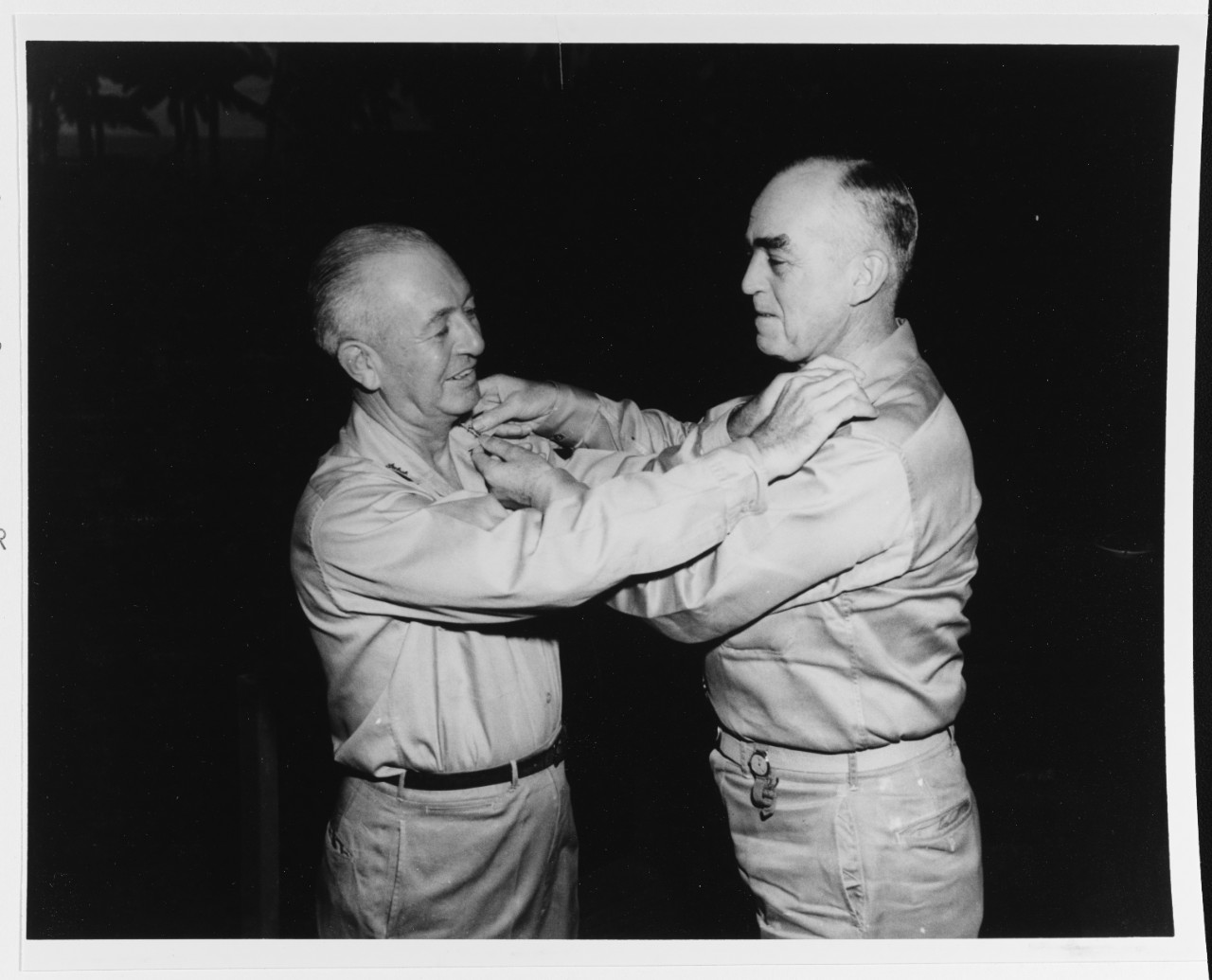
Classmates: Kauffman (left), and Admiral Thomas C. Kinkaid, Commander 7th fleet, both newly promoted, pin the insignia of their new rank, each on the other, at their Philippine headquarters, 6 April 1945.

=== Service in Pacific ===
While still serving on the Antisubmarine Board, Kauffman was ordered to the Pacific theater in October 1943 and served as Board observer attached to Aircraft Squadrons, Pacific, during the attacks on Tarawa and later Kwajalein. He assumed command of cruiser-destroyer forces of Pacific Fleet (COMDESPAC) with headquarters on Hawaii in January 1944 and was responsible for the maintenance of the ships under his command at a state of training, readiness, discipline and morale. Kauffman's command provided ships, personnel and material for U.S. Seventh Fleet and he was decorated with his second Legion of Merit at the end of his tenure in October 1944.

Kauffman reported to General Douglas MacArthur, Supreme Commander Southwest Pacific Area, and Admiral Thomas C. Kinkaid, Commander Allied Naval Forces, Southwest Pacific Area, and Seventh Fleet, at their headquarters in Hollandia, New Guinea and assumed duty as commander of newly established Philippine Sea Frontier. He helped organized this command and was tasked with the mission of safeguarding and protecting shipping in the area under his cognizance. During the early days of the Battle of Leyte Gulf in October 1944, Kauffman served as Senior Officer Present Afloat.

He established his headquarters initially at Leyte Gulf, then shifted to Manila. Kauffman remained in the Philippines until July 1945, when he was ordered back to the United States. For his service in that capacity, he was decorated with the Navy Distinguished Service Medal and also received the Distinguished Service Star by the Government of Philippines. Kauffman was meanwhile promoted to the temporary rank of vice admiral on 3 April 1945.

== Postwar service ==
Following his return stateside, Kauffman was appointed Commandant, Fourth Naval District with headquarters at Philadelphia Navy Yard. He also reverted to his peacetime rank of rear admiral for his assignment in Philadelphia. Kauffman retired from the Navy on 1 May 1949 after 41 years on active service and was advanced again to the rank of vice admiral on the retired list.

One day after he retired from the Navy, Kauffman became the President of Jefferson Medical College and Jefferson Medical Center. He also held additional duty as chairman of the board of the Eastern Pennsylvania Psychiatric Institute and remained in both positions until the end of June 1959. He then became chairman of the board of directors for the Central Philadelphia Branch of the American Red Cross. Kauffman was decorated with Grand Cross of the National Order of Merit "Carlos J. Finlay" by the Government of Cuba during his tenure at Jefferson Medical College.

As a religious man, Kauffman helped establish the mission structure of the Church of the Holy Trinity in South Philadelphia and commenced and continued the Sunday radio broadcasts of the church's worship services, largely as an outreach for people hospitalized or otherwise unable to attend the services. He later moved to Washington, D.C., but died of a heart attack at Bethesda Naval Hospital, Maryland on 21 October 1963, aged 76. Kauffman was buried with full military honors at the United States Naval Academy Cemetery at Annapolis, Maryland.

His wife, Elizabeth Draper Kauffman (1886–1966), is buried beside him. They had two children: a son, Draper, who graduated from the Naval Academy and distinguished himself as commander of the first Underwater Demolition Teams. He was decorated with two Navy Crosses and several other decorations and retired as rear admiral in 1973; and a daughter, Elizabeth Louise, who married Prescott Sheldon Bush Jr., the brother of future President of the United States, George H. W. Bush.

== Military decorations ==
Here is the ribbon bar of Vice Admiral James L. Kauffman:

| 1st Row | Navy Cross | | |
| 2nd Row | Navy Distinguished Service Medal | Legion of Merit with one 5/16" Gold Star | Navy Commendation Medal |
| 3rd Row | Mexican Service Medal | World War I Victory Medal with Fleet Clasp | American Defense Service Medal with "A" Device |
| 4th Row | European-African-Middle Eastern Campaign Medal | American Campaign Medal | Asiatic-Pacific Campaign Medal with two 3/16 inch bronze service stars |
| 5th Row | World War II Victory Medal | Commander of the Order of the Southern Cross (Brazil) | Brazilian Navy War Service Medal |
| 6th Row | Distinguished Service Star (Philippines) | Philippine Liberation Medal with one star | Order of Naval Merit, 1st class with white ribbon (Cuba) |
| 7th Row | National Order of Merit "Carlos J. Finlay", Grand Cross (Cuba) | Knight Commander of the Order of the Falcon (Iceland) | Officer of the Order of Leopold II (Belgium) |

== See also ==
- USS Kauffman (FFG-59), named for VADM Kauffman and his son RADM Draper Laurence Kauffman

Military offices
| Preceded by Milo F. Draemel | Commandant, Fourth Naval District; 20 June 1946 – 28 May 1949 | Succeeded by Roscoe E. Schuirmann |
| Preceded by Mahlon Tisdale | Commandant, Destroyer Force, Pacific; 2 January 1944 – 31 October 1944 | Succeeded by Walden L. Ainsworth |
| Preceded by William H. Allen | Commander, Gulf Sea Frontier; 3 June 1942 – 3 February 1943 | Succeeded by William R. Munroe |
