= Operation Maritime Guard =

- Part of the NATO intervention in Bosnia
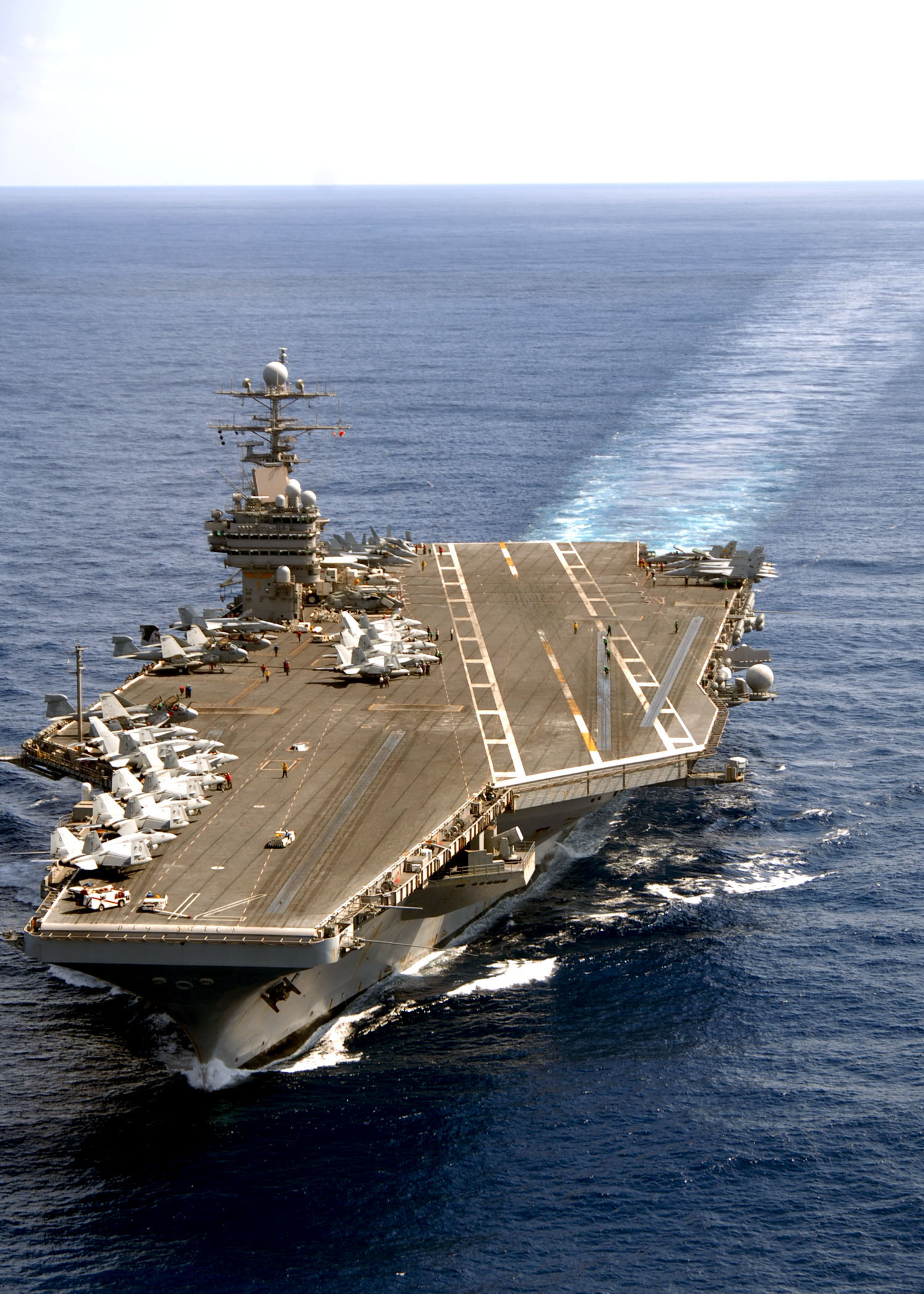
- USS Theodore Roosevelt, which participated in Operation Maritime Guard
- Objective: Blockade the former Yugoslavia.
- Date: November 22, 1992 – 1993
- Executed by: NATO

Operation Maritime Guard was a NATO blockade, in the international waters of the Adriatic Sea, of the former Yugoslavia.

== Scope ==
The operation began on November 22, 1992. It followed NATO Operation Maritime Monitor, and was in support of UN Security Council Resolution 787, which called upon states acting individually or otherwise to enforce the UN embargoes of the former Yugoslavia ("calls upon States ... to use such measures commensurate with the specific circumstances as may be necessary" to enforce the embargo).

It authorized NATO to use force, and included stopping, inspecting, and diverting ships bound for the former Yugoslavia. All ships bound to or coming from the territorial waters of the former Yugoslavia were halted for inspection and verification of their cargoes and destinations.

With support from Turkey, the Netherlands, and Germany, the operation was strengthened to allow for NATO aircraft to shoot down aircraft that violated the blockade. An article in the academic journal International Affairs stated that Operation Maritime Guard was: "the first authorized use of force to back a UN Security Council resolution".

In April 1993, a NATO official said that warships would shoot if necessary to stop a ship to enforce the blockade, with inert munitions which could include machine gun bullets and armor-piercing cannon shells.

== Forces and results ==
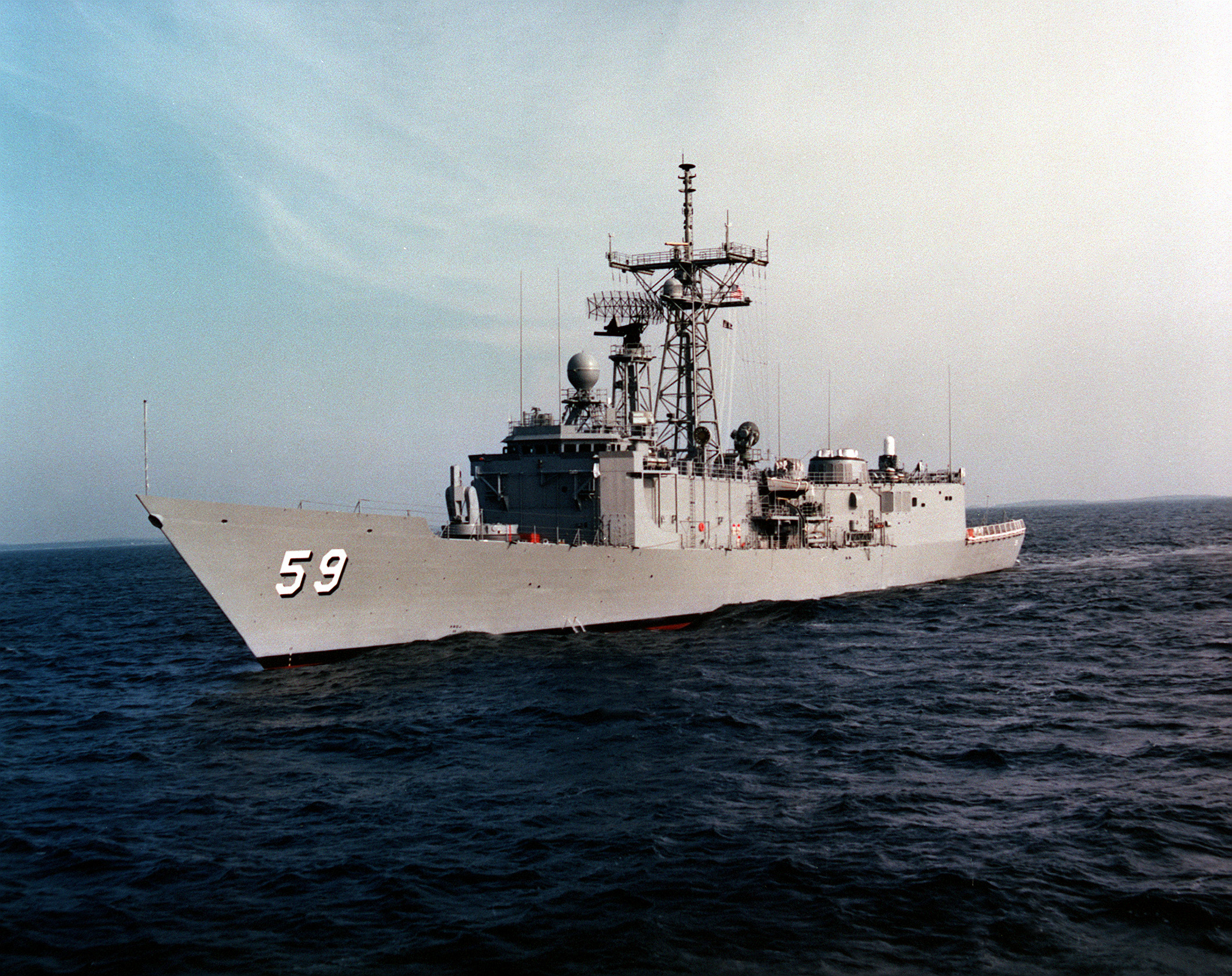
USS Kauffman

The blockade comprised destroyers from Turkey, Italy, Germany, Greece, and the United Kingdom, and frigates from the United States and the Netherlands, assisted by NATO Maritime Patrol Aircraft. The frigate USS Kauffman and aircraft carrier USS Theodore Roosevelt were among the warships that took part in the operation. AWACS supported the effort with its sophisticated maritime radar by providing blockading ships with long-range sea surveillance coverage.

The blockade was directed by the Commander-in-Chief Allied Forces Southern Europe, U.S. Admiral Mike Boorda.

Under the blockade, 12,367 ships were contacted, 1,032 of them were inspected or diverted to a port to be inspected, and 9 ships were found to be violating the UN embargoes.

== Successor ==
Its successor was Operation Sharp Guard. That was a multi-year joint naval blockade in the Adriatic Sea by NATO and the Western European Union on shipments to the former Yugoslavia that began on June 15, 1993, was suspended on June 19, 1996, and was terminated on October 2, 1996.

== See also ==
- Yugoslav Wars
- Legal assessments of the Gaza flotilla raid
