= USS Kauffman =

1986 Oliver Hazard Perry-class frigate

USS Kauffman (FFG-59)
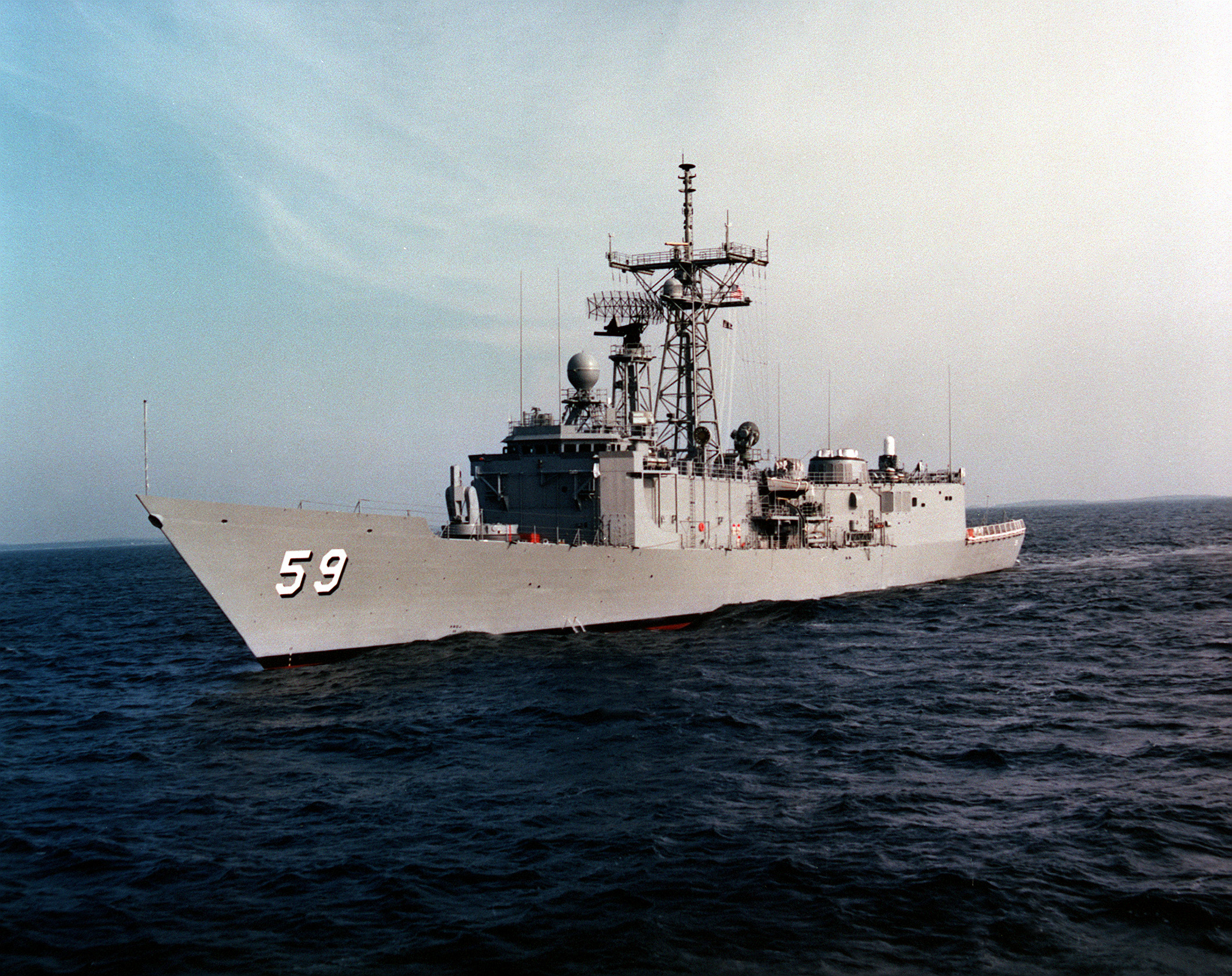
- USS Kauffman (FFG-59), in 1986.

History

United States
- Name: Kauffman
- Namesake: Vice Admiral James L. Kauffman; Rear Admiral Draper L. Kauffman
- Awarded: 28 October 1982
- Builder: Bath Iron Works, Bath, Maine
- Laid down: 8 April 1985
- Launched: 29 March 1986
- Sponsored by: Elizabeth Kauffman Bush
- Commissioned: 28 February 1987
- Decommissioned: 18 September 2015
- Home port: NS Norfolk, Virginia
- Identification: Hull symbol:FFG-59; Code letters:NJLK
- Motto: "Toujours en Vedette"; ("Always in the Lead")
- Nickname(s): Special K
- Status: decommissioned
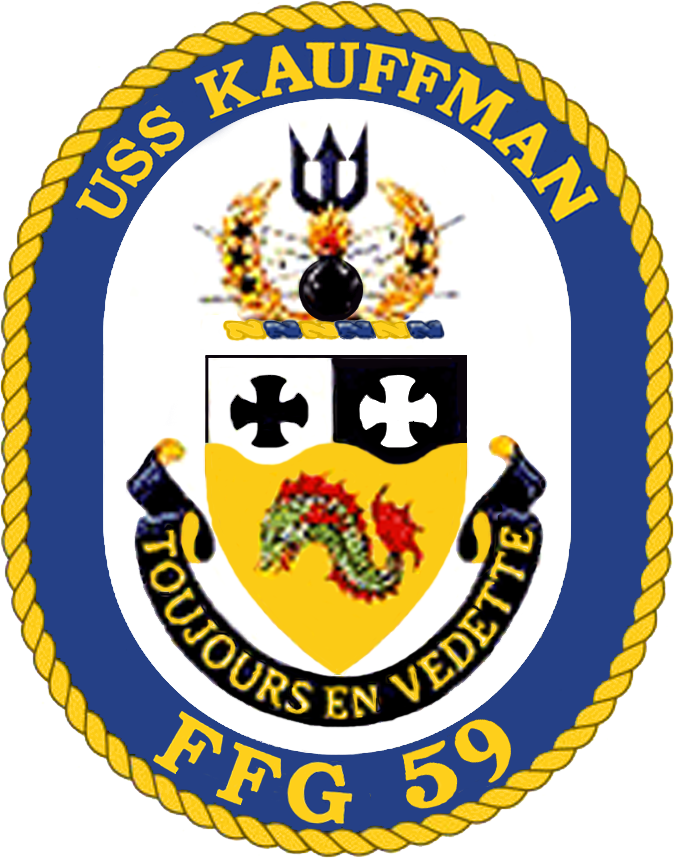
- Badge

General characteristics
- Class & type: Oliver Hazard Perry-class guided missile frigate
- Displacement: 4,100 long tons (4,200 t), full load
- Length: 453 feet (138 m), overall
- Beam: 45 feet (14 m)
- Draught: 22 feet (6.7 m)
- Propulsion: 2 × General Electric LM2500-30 gas turbines generating 41,000 shp (31 MW) through a single shaft and variable pitch propeller; 2 × Auxiliary Propulsion Units, 350 hp (260 kW) retractable electric azimuth thrusters for maneuvering and docking.
- Speed: over 29 knots (54 km/h)
- Range: 5,000 nautical miles at 18 knots (9,300 km at 33 km/h)
- Complement: 15 officers and 190 enlisted, plus SH-60 LAMPS detachment of roughly six officer pilots and 15 enlisted maintainers
- Sensors & processing systems: AN/SPS-49 air-search radar; AN/SPS-55 surface-search radar; CAS and STIR fire-control radar; AN/SQS-56 sonar.
- Electronic warfare & decoys: AN/SLQ-32
- Armament: As built: 1 × OTO Melara Mk 75 76 mm/62 caliber naval gun; 2 × Mk 32 triple-tube (324 mm) launchers for Mark 46 torpedoes; 1 × Vulcan Phalanx CIWS; 4 × .50-cal (12.7 mm) machine guns.; 1 × Mk 13 Mod 4 single-arm launcher for Harpoon anti-ship missiles and SM-1MR Standard anti-ship/air missiles (40 round magazine); Note: As of 2004, Mk 13 systems removed from all active US vessels of this class.
- Aircraft carried: 2 × SH-60 LAMPS III helicopters
- Aviation facilities: 2 × hangars; RAST helicopter hauldown system

USS Kauffman (FFG-59) is a decommissioned Oliver Hazard Perry-class guided missile frigate of the United States Navy named for Vice Admiral James L. Kauffman (1887–1963) and his son, Rear Admiral Draper L. Kauffman (1911–1979), both experts in sub-surface naval missions.

Kauffman was laid down on 8 April 1985 by the Bath Iron Works, Bath, Maine; launched on 29 March 1986; sponsored by Mrs. Elizabeth Kauffman Bush, the daughter of Vice Admiral James L. Kauffman and sister of Rear Admiral Draper L. Kauffman; and commissioned on 28 February 1987 at Bath, Maine.

As of 2012, Kauffman was homeported at NS Norfolk, Virginia, and assigned to Destroyer Squadron 22.

Kauffman deployed for the final time on 8 January 2015. She was decommissioned on 18 September 2015. At the time of her decommissioning, she was one of only two Oliver Hazzard Perry-class ships remaining; the last Oliver Hazard Perry-class ship to be decommissioned was USS Simpson (FFG-56).

== History ==
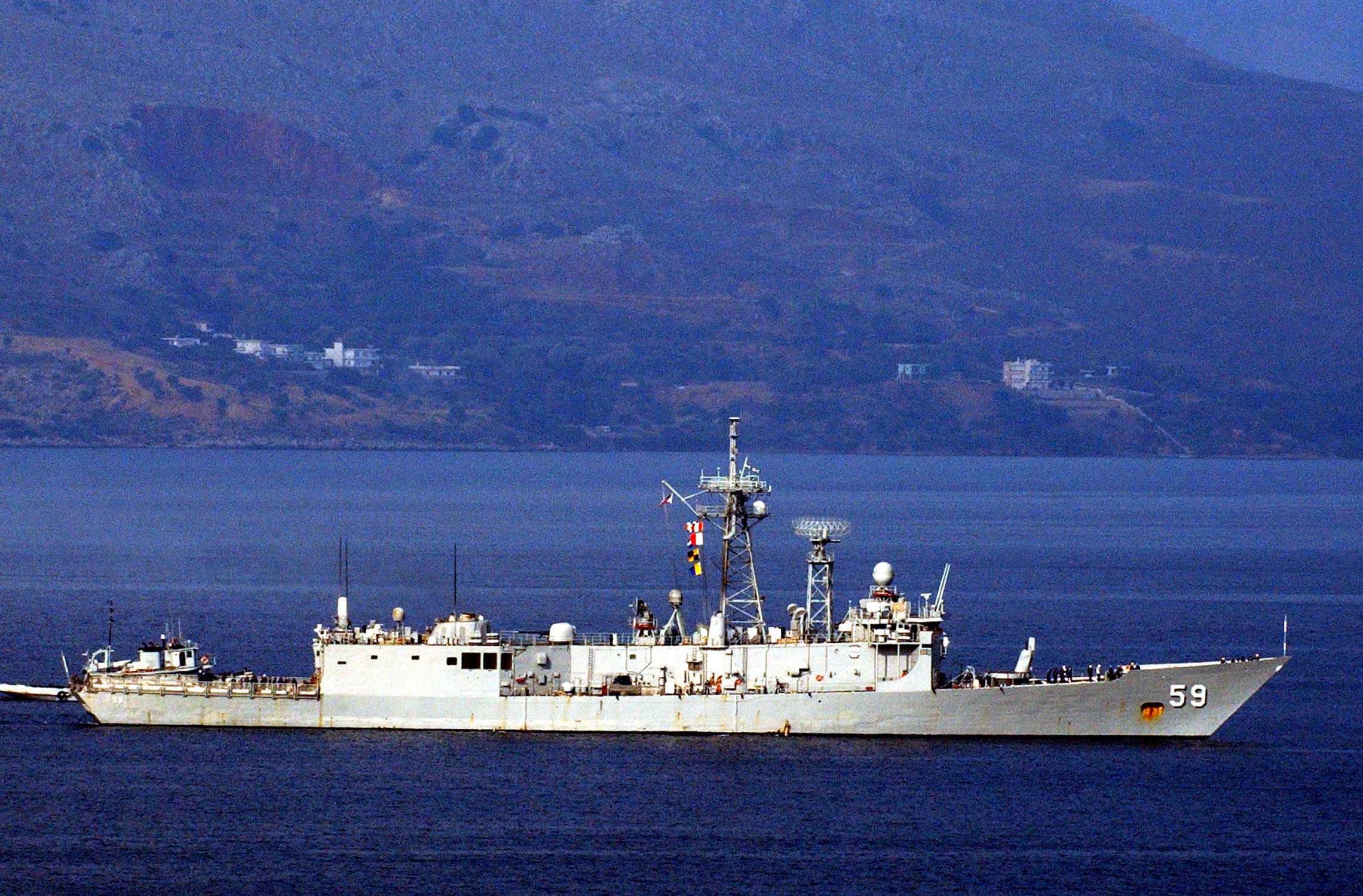
USS Kauffman sailing through Souda Bay, Crete, in August 2002.

Note: the milestones are extracted from the official command histories and no other sources. The set of command histories available is not complete, resulting in the partial record following.

1988

- 6 January – 28 May: 4100 ton modifications by Bath Iron Works in Bath, Maine.
- 12 August: a sailor died instantly when the Slewing Arm Davit broke from its mount and fell on him.

1989

- 31 May – 10 November: Maiden deployment, Med 3–89
- 4–7 August: Port visit to Sevastopol, Soviet Union
- October: Sixth Fleet "Hook'em" Award for best ASW platform in Sixth Fleet AO in 1989
- 13 September – 3 October: NATO exercise Display Determination-89

1990

- 9 January: presented with Battle 'E'
- 15 January – 15 March: ships restricted availability, #1A gas turbine engine and the Mk. 75 76mm gun mount are replaced
- 8–15 June: BALTOPS-90
- 27–30 June: Gdynia, Poland port visit

1991

- 26 April – 26 October: deployment, MEF 2–91
- 4 June – 16 September: Middle East Force (MEF) operations in the Persian Gulf

1992

- 6 January – 21 February: counter narcotic operations, Caribbean Sea
  - towed a vessel that had lost propulsion 250 nautical miles (460 km; 290 mi) to Guantanamo Bay, Cuba
  - rescued the crew from the stricken 237 feet (72 m) coastal freighter Ramsli just before she sank
- 2 August – 23 October: Ships Restricted Availability (Drydock), by Bath Iron Works Bath, Maine
- 15 September: presented with Battle 'E'

1993

- 11 March – 8 September: deployed, Med 2–93
- 29 April – 18 June: Operation Deny Flight in the Adriatic Sea, Operation Maritime Guard
- 22 June – 17 August: Maritime Interdiction Operations enforcing United Nations sanctions against Iraq, North Red Sea
- 7 November: provided assistance to the Argentine frigate ARA Granville (P-33) while in port at Roosevelt Roads Naval Station, Puerto Rico
- 9 November – 6 December: counter drug operations, Caribbean Sea

1994

- 13 May – 3 June: Maritime Interception Operations enforcing United Nations sanctions against Haiti
- 6 June: Homeport shift from Newport, Rhode Island, to Norfolk, Virginia
- 1 July – 1 August: Operation Support Democracy, Haiti with 3 US Army OH-58 Kiowa helicopters
- 5–6 July: rescued 787 migrants from Haitian waters, transported to Guantanamo Bay, Cuba
- 20–21 July: towed the Motor Vessel Valerie I from the south coast of Haiti to Guantanamo Bay, Cuba

1996

- 24 April: completion of an extended ships restricted availability period beginning September 1995, including installation of Mod 6 to the Mk 92 Guided Missile Fire Control System
- 8 July – 24 August: counter drug operations, Caribbean Sea
- 20 September: Commander John A. Kunert, USN relieves Commander David F. Britt, USN
- 10–31 December: Operation Carib Shield – counter drug operations, Caribbean Sea

1997

- 1–17 January: Operation Carib Shield – counter drug operations, Caribbean Sea
- 4 March – 24 June: ships restricted availability (drydock) by Norfolk Shipbuilding and Drydock Company

1998

- 13 March – 11 September: deployed, Med (originally tasked to Middle East Force)
- 12 October – 11 December: planned restricted availability

1999

- 15–18 September: sortied for Hurricane Dennis

2004

- 15 July – 22 September: ships restricted availability, installed Mk 53 "Nulka" Decoy Launching System (DLS)
