= Philippine Sea Frontier =

The Philippine Sea Frontier (PHILSEAFRON) was a United States Navy Sea Frontier active in 1941, and reformed in 1944.

On 8 December 1941 it was part of the 16th Naval District, a component of the United States Asiatic Fleet.

(Naval Coastal Frontier until 6 February 1942) Inactive from 6 May 1942 to 13 November 1944) Rear Admiral Francis W. Rockwell: 7 December 1941--18 March 1942 Captain Kenneth M. Hoeffel: 18 March 1942--6 May 1942

The Philippine Sea Frontier (Rear Admiral James L. Kauffman, Commander) was reestablished as a separate command under Commander Seventh Fleet (Southwest Pacific Area) on 13 November 1944. Rear Admiral J. L. Kauffman embarked in the amphibious force command ship USS Wasatch to establish his temporary headquarters aboard while the ship was berthed at San Pedro Bay, Leyte as Commander, Philippine Sea Frontier, from 29 November to 2 December 1944. Kauffman was later promoted to vice admiral. He was charged with the mission of safeguarding and protecting shipping in the area under his cognizance.

He maintained an Operations Board at his headquarters at Tolosa, Leyte, on which was kept a running record of the scheduled and actual arrival and departure of vessels of all categories in the area under his cognizance. His Headquarters was given intelligence of all submarine activity in the Philippine Sea.

During the period of the loss of the cruiser USS Indianapolis, Commander, Philippine Sea Frontier, Vice Admiral Kauffman was absent from his command since 1 July 1945, on temporary duty status in the United States; Commodore Norman C. Gillette was in temporary command; and the Operations Officer of the Headquarters Staff, Captain A. M. Granum, was intensively occupied in diversion of shipping in typhoon areas and operations.

Vice Admiral Kauffman handed over command on 2 September 1945.

USS Bumper served as a unit of Submarines, Philippine Sea Frontier, from September 1945 to April 1946.
