= Robert Alfred Theobald =

United States Navy admiral (1884–1957)

Robert A. Theobald
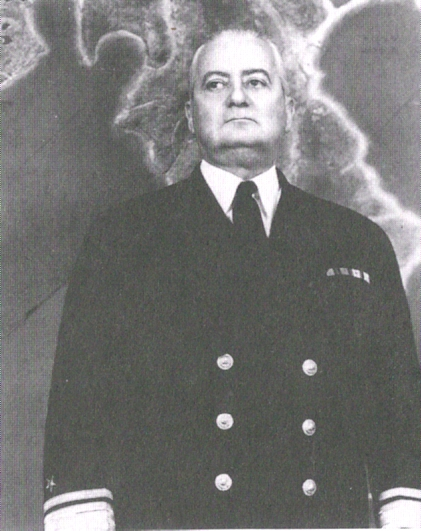
- Rear Admiral Robert A. "Fuzzy" Theobald standing in front of a map of Kiska in 1942
- Born: January 25, 1884; San Francisco, California, US
- Died: May 13, 1957 (aged 73); Boston, Massachusetts, US
- Burial place: Arlington National Cemetery
- Military career
- Allegiance: United States
- Branch: United States Navy
- Service years: 1907–1945
- Rank: Rear Admiral
- Nickname: "Fuzzy"
- Commands: USS Walke (DD-34); Naval Postgraduate School; USS Nevada (BB-36); Cruiser Division Three; Destroyer Flotilla One; Destroyers, Pacific Fleet; North Pacific Force (Task Force 8); First Naval District; Boston Navy Yard
- Conflicts: World War I; World War II; Pacific War; Attack on Pearl Harbor; Aleutian Campaign
- Awards: Legion of Honour
- Other work: Author

Robert Alfred Theobald (January 25, 1884 – May 13, 1957), nicknamed "Fuzzy", was a United States Navy officer who served in World War I and World War II, and achieved the rank of rear admiral. In retirement, he was the author of the 1954 book The Final Secret of Pearl Harbor: The Washington Background of the Pearl Harbor Attack.

== Biography ==
Born in San Francisco, California, on January 25, 1884, Theobald attended the University of California in 1902–1903 before entering the United States Naval Academy, from which he graduated ninth in his class in 1907. He was commissioned as an ensign in 1908. His first tour as a commanding officer was of the destroyer USS Walke (DD-34) in 1915.

=== World War I ===
During World War I, Theobald served as gunnery officer of the battleship USS New York (BB-34), the flagship of Battleship Division Nine, which served with the British Grand Fleet in 1917–1918. He received promotion to commander in September 1918.

=== Interwar years ===
Theobald served as executive officer of the Naval Postgraduate School from 1919 to 1921, then spent the years 1922 through 1924 serving in Destroyer Command, United States Asiatic Fleet, before returning to the School to serve as its commanding officer from 1924 to 1927. He then spent two years as the executive officer of the battleship USS West Virginia (BB-48), before studying in the senior class of the Naval War College.

In 1930, Theobald served as secretary of war plans at the Department of the Navy and as a member of the Joint Army-Navy Planning Committee. In February 1932 he received promotion to captain, and was Chief of Staff, Destroyers, United States Pacific Fleet from 1932 to 1934. He was a member of the advanced class at the Naval War College, engaged in a seminar study of "Japan and Pacific War" in 1934–1935, and was then put in charge of the college's Strategy Division.

In 1937 Theobald was appointed commanding officer of the battleship USS Nevada (BB-36), then served as Chief of Staff to Admiral Claude C. Bloch, the Commander-in-Chief of the United States Fleet, in 1939. Theobald joined the General Board of the United States Navy early in 1940, and was promoted to rear admiral in June 1940, serving as Commander of Cruiser Division Three and then as Commander of Destroyer Flotilla One in the Pacific Fleet.

=== World War II ===
On the morning of December 7, 1941, twenty ships of Destroyer Flotilla One were moored at Pearl Harbor, Territory of Hawaii, when the Japanese attacked. Theobald, from his temporary flagship, the destroyer tender USS Dobbin (AD-3), was ordered to provide anti-aircraft fire, and sent Destroyer Division Two out of the harbor to establish an off-shore patrol.

Theobald served as Commander of Pacific Fleet Destroyers (ComDesPac) from December 1941 until May 1942 before being appointed Commander of the North Pacific Force (Task Force 8) for operations in the Aleutian Islands in the Territory of Alaska. The Aleutian Islands Campaign began in June 1942 and, after suffering minor defeats against Japanese naval forces, including the Japanese capture of the islands of Attu and Kiska, Theobald was replaced by Rear Admiral Thomas C. Kinkaid.

In January 1943 Theobald was appointed Commandant of the First Naval District and of Boston Navy Yard in Boston, Massachusetts. He retired from active service in 1945. For his wartime service for the Allied cause, Theobald was appointed Officer of the Legion of Honour by the Government of France.

=== Post-World War II ===
After World War II, Theobald gained considerable notoriety with his 1954 book The Final Secret of Pearl Harbor: The Washington Background of the Pearl Harbor Attack, which accused the administration of President Franklin Delano Roosevelt of suppressing intelligence about the attack in order to bring the United States into the war.

== Personal life ==
Theobold was first married to Helen Reeves Berry (August 24, 1888 - February 23, 1938). They had two children, Robert Theobald Jr. (1910–1989) and Frances Theobald Brainerd (1913–2008). Robert Theobald Jr. was also a graduate of the United States Naval Academy (1931) and achieved the rank of captain in the U.S. Navy.

Theobald married the former Elizabeth Dartnell (August 9, 1909 – January 3, 1996) in 1941.

== Death ==
Theobald died in Boston, Massachusetts, on May 13, 1957. He is buried with his second wife Elizabeth at Arlington National Cemetery in Arlington, Virginia.

== Publications ==
- Theobald, Robert Alfred. The Final Secret of Pearl Harbor: The Washington Contribution to the Japanese Attack, New York: Devin-Adair, 1954.

== Awards and decorations ==
Here is the ribbon bar of Rear Admiral Theobald:

1st Row	Haitian Campaign Medal		
2nd Row	World War I Victory Medal with Escort Clasp	American Defense Service Medal with Fleet Clasp	American Campaign Medal
3rd Row	Asiatic-Pacific Campaign Medal with two 3/16 inch service stars	World War II Victory Medal	Officer of the Legion of Honour (France)
