= Sea Frontier =

US Naval coastal protection commands during World War 2

Sea Frontiers were several, now disestablished, commands of the United States Navy as areas of defense against enemy vessels, especially submarines, along the U.S. coasts. They existed from 1 July 1941 until in some cases the 1970s. Sea Frontiers generally started at the shore of the United States and extended outwards into the sea for a nominal distance of two hundred miles.

As early as 1927 the Navy's plans for the coastal defense of the United States and its Territories and possessions provided for the establishment of Naval Coastal Frontiers that would be larger operational commands than the individual Naval Districts. On 1 July 1941, the Chief of Naval Operations formally established several Naval Coastal Frontiers; on 6 February 1942, these were renamed Sea Frontiers. Each Frontier was a geographic area, usually comprising a number of Naval Districts but including in addition the outer shipping lanes in its sea area. The land areas of the Frontiers corresponded roughly to the Army's Defense Commands, but the boundaries were not identical. The Frontier Commander was usually also the commandant of a Naval District within the Frontier. The chief responsibilities of the Sea Frontiers during World War II were operational; Frontier forces engaged actively in scouting for enemy forces, particularly submarines, and in attack on any enemy units within their boundaries. Toward the end of the war the Frontiers were assigned administrative and logistic functions in addition to their operational responsibilities.

Navy General Order No. 143, issued on 3 February 1941, stated that Commandants of United States naval districts and Commanders of Naval Coastal Frontiers have administrative responsibility direct to the Navy Department for local and coastal forces; but Commanders of Naval Coastal Frontiers have task responsibility to the Chief of Naval Operations for Naval Coastal Frontier Forces.

In addition to U.S. Navy Sea Frontiers, the Canadian Northwest Atlantic was the responsibility of the Royal Canadian Navy. This formation was very active since the majority of trans-Atlantic convoys originated or terminated in Canadian waters.

== List of Sea Frontiers ==
=== Alaskan Sea Frontier ===
First established on 15 April 1944 with Vice Admiral Frank J. Fletcher in command, who remained in that capacity for the duration of the War as Task Force 91. From 1 January 1947 with the establishment of United States Pacific Command, Task Force 95, Rear Admiral Freeland A. Daubin's Alaskan Sea Frontier, was to operate under the commander-in-chief of the Alaskan Command, Major General Craig.

In March 1950, Rear Admiral Clifton Sprague was moved to Alaska, where he served as commandant of Seventeenth Naval District and commander of the Alaskan Sea Frontier on Kodiak Island.

Finally inactivated in 1971 as part of post-Vietnam military reductions. (jber.af.mil/library/factsheets, ALCOM)

=== Caribbean Sea Frontier ===
Caribbean Sea Frontier – The Caribbean Sea Frontier (CARIBSEAFRON) was under the command of Vice Admiral John H. Hoover, Commander Caribbean Sea Frontier or COMCARIBSEAFRON, and the responsibility of the frontier was the protection of Allied shipping in the Caribbean and along the Atlantic Coast of South America during World War II. The German U-boat made a last bitter stand in the Trinidad area in the fall of 1942. Since then, coastal waters continued to be relatively safe of the U-boat menace. Four admirals held command of the frontier during World War II:

- Vice Admiral John H. Hoover: 7 December 1941 - 12 August 1943
- Vice Admiral Arthur B. Cook: 12 August 1943 - 14 May 1944
- Vice Admiral Robert C. Giffen: 14 May 1944 - 20 August 1945
- Vice Admiral William R. Munroe: 20 August 1945 - 2 September 1945

=== Eastern Sea Frontier ===
Eastern Sea Frontier – proved to be a "rich hunting ground" for German submarines during early years of the war. See Second Happy Time. Following admirals held command of the frontier during the World War II:

- Vice Admiral Adolphus Andrews: 7 December 1941 - 1 November 1943
- Vice Admiral Herbert F. Leary: 1 November 1943 - 2 September 1945

=== Gulf Sea Frontier ===
Gulf Sea Frontier – Organized 6 February 1942 the Gulf Sea Frontier (GULFSEAFRON) was headquartered at Key West, Florida, and was later moved to Miami, Florida on 17 June 1942. It was responsible for protecting the waters of Florida and the Bahamas as well as the Gulf of Mexico, the Yucatán Channel and areas near Cuba. The following admirals held command of the frontier during World War II:

- Rear Admiral William H. Allen: 7 December 1941 - 3 February 1942
- Captain Russell S. Crenshaw (Acting): 3 February 1942 - 3 June 1942
- Rear Admiral James L. Kauffman: 3 June 1942 - 3 February 1943
- Captain Howard H. J. Benson (Acting): 3 February 1943 - 1 April 1943
- Rear Admiral William R. Munroe: 1 April 1943 - 25 March 1944
- Captain Howard H. J. Benson (Acting): 25 March 1944 - 17 July 1944
- Rear Admiral Walter S. Anderson: 17 July 1944 - 2 September 1945

==== Participating units ====
- VS-1D7

=== Hawaiian Sea Frontier ===
The Hawaiian Sea Frontier (HawSeaFron) was a formation of the United States Navy established during World War II. It was organized to defend the island of Oahu. Vice Admiral David W. Bagley served as COMHAWSEAFRON from 4 April 1942 until July 1943. The Hawaiian Sea Frontier did not actually come into a settled form until September 1942. The Assistant Chief of Staff (HawSeaFron) attempted to mold the organization to a degree similar to the Western Sea Frontier. The difficulty of selecting a site for the joint Operating Center delayed his plans. Originally, it was planned to have a district headquarters in Honolulu, with a part of the building devoted to the Frontier headquarters. When the plan did not prove feasible, it was decided to take two and a half tunnels at the Aliamanu Crater. Because of the limitations of space and the distance from the Commandant's headquarters, the location did not become more than an operational center. Since the Crater was on U.S. Army property, the construction of a Joint Operating Center with a major plot was never accomplished because of the fluctuations of the war and difficulties over appropriations. One service did not desire to build and pay more than its share of expenses from its limited appropriations for the benefit of another service. The Frontier suffered because of its unique location to the Pacific Fleet's sprawling auxiliary, ComServPac. These two echelons determined the number of vessels under its control as well as the complements of manpower. In cases of emergency, units of the Fleet took over convoy and antisubmarine patrols. Just as its surface units were controlled by higher echelons, so also were its air units by Air Forces, Pacific Fleet. The major functions of the Hawaiian Sea Frontier were the maintenance of picket ships outside Pearl Harbor and the Port of Honolulu, the escorting of inter-island shipping, and the establishment of air-sea rescue facilities. Following admirals held command of the frontier during the World War II:

- Rear Admiral Claude C. Bloch: 7 December 1941 - 2 April 1942
- Rear Admiral David W. Bagley: 2 April 1942 - 17 February 1943
- Vice Admiral Robert L. Ghormley: 17 February 1943 - 25 October 1944
- Commodore Marion C. Robertson (Acting): 25 October 1944 - 28 November 1944
- Vice Admiral David W. Bagley: 28 November 1944 - 25 July 1945
- Vice Admiral Sherwoode A. Taffinder: 25 July 1945 - 2 September 1945

=== Moroccan Sea Frontier ===
The Morocco Sea Frontier, sometimes called the North Africa Sea Frontier, was a U.S. naval unit on the east coast of French Morocco during World War II. It was established as a Sea Frontier under the command of Rear Admiral John L. Hall, Jr. Following admirals held command of the frontier during the World War II:

- Rear Admiral John L. Hall, Jr.: 19 November 1942 - 9 February 1943
- Captain Chester L. Nichols (Acting): 9 February 1943 - 19 February 1943
- Rear Admiral Frank J. Lowry: 19 February 1943 - 20 September 1943
- Captain Chester L. Nichols (Acting): 20 September 1943 - 13 October 1943
- Commodore Benjamin V. McCandlish: 13 October 1943 - 1 August 1945

=== Northwest Sea Frontier ===
Northwest Sea Frontier – established as the Pacific Northern Naval Coastal Frontier, became the Northwest Sea Frontier in 1942, with headquarters at Seattle. Its Commander was also Commandant of the Thirteenth Naval District, and its land area coincided with that of the District, which until April 1944. included Alaska, Washington, Oregon, Montana, Idaho, and Wyoming. For administrative and operational purposes the Frontier was divided into the Northwestern and the Alaskan Sectors. In conjunction with the Army the Frontier maintained the Joint Operations Center at Seattle. On 15 April 1944, the Seventeenth Naval District, which consisted of Alaska and the Aleutian Islands, was established, and the Northwest Sea Frontier was abolished. Following admirals held command of the frontier during the World War II:

- Vice Admiral Charles S. Freeman: 7 December 1941 - 21 November 1942
- Vice Admiral Frank J. Fletcher: 21 November 1942 - 15 April 1944

=== Panama Sea Frontier ===
Panama Sea Frontier was responsible for the defense of the Pacific and Atlantic sea approaches to the Panama Canal and for naval shore facilities in the Central America region during World War II. The Sea Frontier headquarters were located in Balboa, Panama. Following admirals held command of the frontier during the World War II:

- Rear Admiral Frank H. Sadler: 7 December 1941 - 15 April 1942
- Rear Admiral Clifford E. Van Hook: 15 April 1942 - 14 October 1943
- Rear Admiral Harold C. Train: 14 October 1943 - 10 June 1944
- Captain Ellis S. Stone (Acting): 11 June 1944 - 3 November 1944
- Rear Admiral Howard F. Kingman: 3 November 1944 - 9 July 1945
- Captain Schuyler Mills (Acting): 9 July 1945 - 23 August 1945
- Rear Admiral John R. Beardall: 23 August 1945 - 2 September 1945

=== Philippine Sea Frontier ===
Philippine Sea Frontier – organised after U.S. return to the Philippines in 1944. Following admirals held command of the frontier during the World War II:

- Rear Admiral Francis W. Rockwell: 7 December 1941 - 18 March 1942
- Captain Kenneth M. Hoeffel: 18 March 1942 - 6 May 1942
- Vice Admiral James L. Kauffman: 13 November 1944 - 2 September 1945

=== Western Sea Frontier ===
Western Sea Frontier – the Western Sea Frontier (WESTSEAFRON) headquartered in San Francisco, was responsible for the sea defense of the Pacific coast of the United States and Mexico during World War II. The frontier commander was designated Commander, Western Sea Frontier (COMWESTSEAFRON). The Western Sea Frontier was composed of many forces and commands, including the Eleventh, Twelfth, and Thirteenth Naval Districts. The Western Sea Frontier consisted of the Pacific Coastal regions lying west of the Cascade Range and Sierra Nevada as well as of Alaska. Western Sea Frontier's commander also served as commander of the Pacific Reserve Fleet as of 1937–38. Following admirals held command of the frontier during the World War II:

- Vice Admiral John W. Greenslade: 7 December 1941 - 1 February 1944
- Vice Admiral David W. Bagley: 1 February 1944 - 17 November 1944
- Admiral Royal E. Ingersoll: 17 November 1944 - 2 September 1945

== See also ==
- List of major U.S. Commands of World War II
