= USS Rainier (1917) =

Patrol vessel of the United States Navy

History

United States
- Name: Rainier
- Namesake: Mount Rainier in the Cascade Range in Washington
- Completed: 1917
- Acquired: 7 June 1917
- Commissioned: 30 July 1917
- Decommissioned: 28 May 1919
- Stricken: 8 September 1919
- Fate: Sold 5 August 1921

General characteristics
- Type: Patrol vessel
- Displacement: 340 long tons (350 t)
- Length: 119 ft 9 in (36.50 m)
- Beam: 26 ft (7.9 m)
- Draft: 8 ft 6 in (2.59 m)
- Speed: 5 kn (5.8 mph; 9.3 km/h)
- Complement: 41
- Armament: 2 × 4 in (100 mm) guns; 2 × machine guns

The first USS Rainier was a United States Navy patrol vessel in commission from 1917 to 1919.

Rainier, originally named Patrol and then Angel, was built as a civilian schooner in 1917 at Portland, Oregon. The U.S. Navy purchased her on 7 June 1917 for use as a patrol vessel during World War I. She was commissioned on 30 July 1917 at Mare Island Navy Yard at Vallejo, California, Lt. James L. Kauffman in command, as USS Rainier. She never received a section patrol (SP) number.

== Service history ==
Attached to Division 2, United States Pacific Fleet, Rainier was assigned to the Mexican Patrol. She operated off Southern California and Mexico's Baja California for the rest of World War I and until 1 March 1919.

Rainier was decommissioned on 28 May 1919 at Mare Island Navy Yard and was stricken from the Navy List on 8 September 1919. She was sold to E. W. Cullen of Alameda, California, on 5 August 1921.
