= COMDESPAC =

Defunct American naval command of the 1940s

The Destroyer Force, United States Pacific Fleet, usually known as COMDESPAC, was a type command of the United States Pacific Fleet from 1940 until the Destroyer Force was combined with Cruisers, Pacific Fleet and in 1975 type command functions of both were transferred to Commander, Naval Surface Forces Pacific. The Pacific Fleet Destroyer Force comprised the Destroyers of the fleet (DD) operating in Pacific Fleet area of responsibility. The Commander, Destroyers, Pacific Fleet supervised the assignments, basing, maintenance of the destroyers, the training of crews and reported to the Commander in Chief, United States Pacific Fleet (CinCPac), on Destroyer operations.

Forces were under the COMDESPAC were known as DesPac.

In 1940-1941 The Destroyer Force of the Pacific Fleet consisted of two Destroyer Flotillas, Flotilla One was commanded by Rear Admiral Theobald and Flotilla Two was commanded by Rear Admiral Draemel (COMDESPAC).

== Commanders ==
Former Commanders, Destroyers, Battle Force

- Rear Admiral Milo F. Draemel USN (September 1940 - 31 December 1941)
- Rear Admiral Robert Alfred Theobald USN (31 December 1941 - 10 April 1942)

Former Commanders, Destroyers, Pacific Fleet

- Rear Admiral Robert Alfred Theobald USN (10 April 1942 - 4 July 1942)
- Rear Admiral Walden L. Ainsworth USN (4 July 1942 - 8 Jan 1943)
- Rear Admiral Mahlon Tisdale USN (8 January 1943 - 2 January 1944)
- Rear Admiral James L. Kauffman USN (2 January 1944 - 31 October 1944)
- Rear Admiral Walden L. Ainsworth USN (31 October 1944 - 13 July 1945)
- Rear Admiral William H. P. Blandy USN (13 July 1945 - 2 September 1945)
