= USS Barney (DD-149) =

Wickes-class destroyer

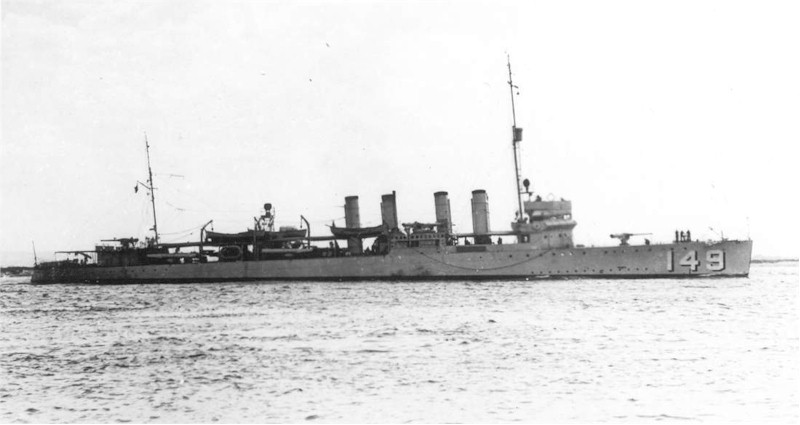
- USS Barney

History

United States
- Name: Barney
- Namesake: Joshua Barney
- Builder: William Cramp & Sons, Philadelphia
- Cost: $1,448,398.36 (hull and machinery)
- Yard number: 464
- Laid down: 26 March 1918
- Launched: 5 September 1918
- Commissioned: 14 March 1919
- Decommissioned: 30 June 1922
- Identification: DD-149
- Recommissioned: 1 May 1930
- Decommissioned: 30 November 1945
- Reclassified: AG-113, 30 June 1945
- Fate: Sold for scrapping, 13 October 1946

General characteristics
- Class & type: Wickes-class destroyer
- Displacement: 1,154 tons
- Length: 314 ft 4 in (95.8 m)
- Beam: 31 ft 8 in (9.7 m)
- Draft: 9 ft 0 in (2.7 m)
- Speed: 35 knots (65 km/h)
- Complement: 133 officers and enlisted
- Armament: 4 × 4 in (102 mm)/50 guns; 2 × 3 in (76 mm)/23 guns; 12 × 21 in (533 mm) torpedo tubes

USS Barney (DD–149) was a Wickes-class destroyer in the United States Navy during World War II, later redesignated AG-113. She was the second ship named for Commodore Joshua Barney.

Barney was launched on 5 September 1918 by William Cramp & Sons Ship and Engine Building Company, Philadelphia, sponsored by Miss Nannie Dornin Barney, great-granddaughter of Commodore Barney. The ship was commissioned on 14 March 1919, Lieutenant Commander James L. Kauffman in command.

== Service history ==
Barney reported to Division 19, Atlantic Fleet, and engaged in fleet exercises and maneuvers along the east coast until 30 June 1922, when she went out of commission at Philadelphia. Recommissioned on 1 May 1930, Barney operated with Destroyer Squadron, Scouting Force, on the east coast and in the Caribbean Sea until transiting the Panama Canal in February 1932 to participate in fleet problems off San Francisco. Remaining on the west coast, she operated for a time in reduced commission with Rotating Destroyer Squadron 20 Scouting Force. In 1935 she cruised with Destroyer Division 3 to Alaska thence to Honolulu, and later to the Puget Sound area for fleet problems.

Returning to the east coast, she conducted cruises with the 10th Training Squadron until November 1936, when she was placed out of commission. Recommissioned on 4 October 1939, she served on patrol duty with the 66th Division, Atlantic Squadron, and during the following year with the Inshore Patrol, 18th Naval District Defense Force.

Between December 1941 and November 1943, Barney was assigned to the Caribbean area, escorting convoys between Trinidad British West Indies; and Guantánamo Bay, Cuba. On 18 September 1942, she had a collision with the destroyer Greer, resulting in severe damage and the loss of two of her crew by drowning. Both ships returned to Willemstad, Curaçao, Netherlands West Indies, where temporary repairs were made and then Barney departed for Charleston Navy Yard. Permanent repairs completed in December 1942, she returned to the Caribbean.

During 14 January–May 1944, Barney completed two convoy escort crossings to North Africa. From May 1944 until February 1945, she escorted convoys in the Caribbean. In March 1945, she was assigned to TE 25 and engaged in training exercises with submarines in Long Island and Block Island Sounds. On 30 June 1945, her classification was changed to AG-113. Barney was decommissioned on 30 November 1945 and sold for scrap on 13 October 1946.

== Awards ==
Barney received one battle star for her escort of Convoy UOS 37 (11 April 1944 – 12 April 1944).
