= William H. P. Blandy =

United States admiral

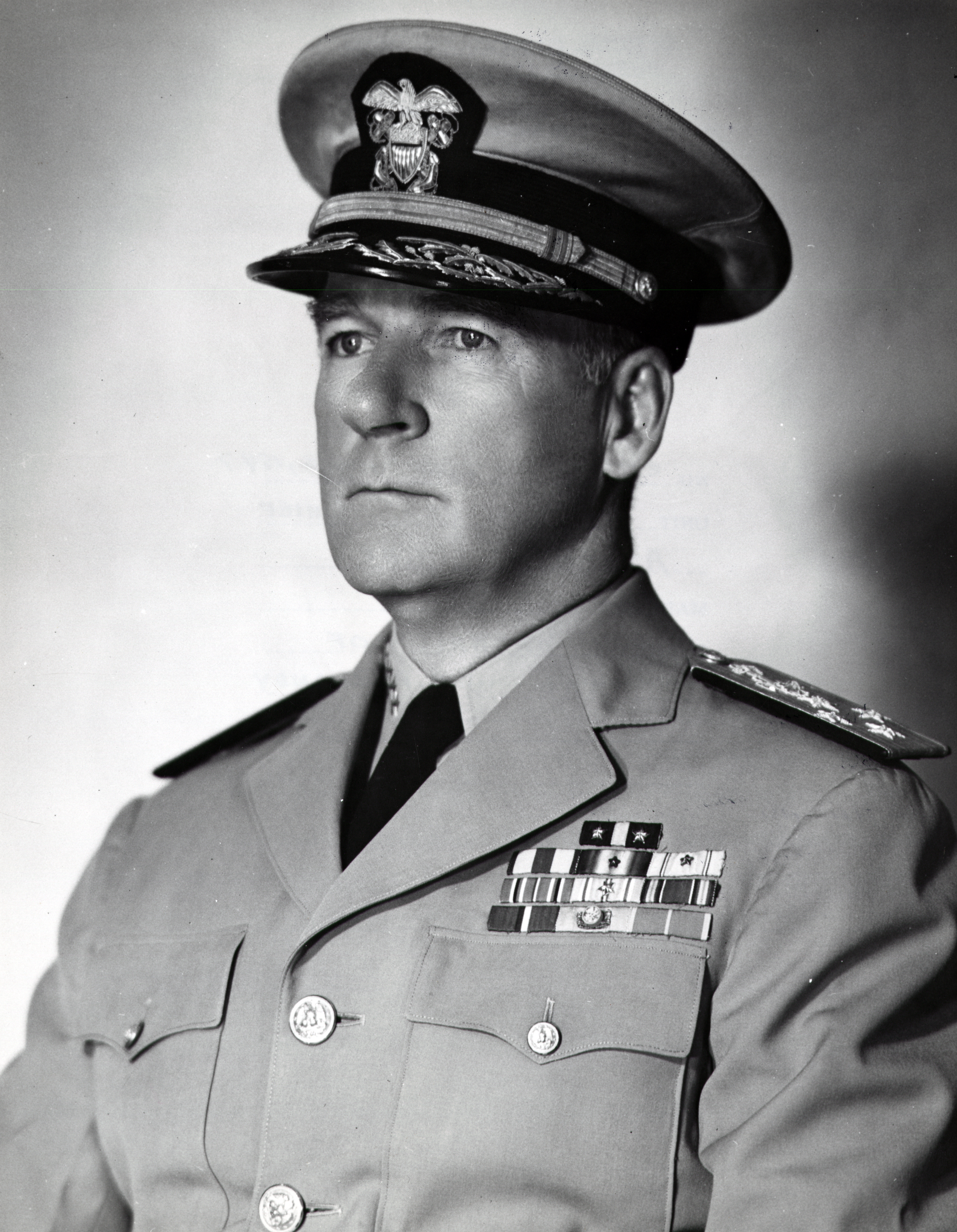
- Admiral William Henry Purnell Blandy
- Born: 28 June 1890; New York City, US
- Died: 12 January 1954 (aged 63); St. Albans, New York, US
- Burial place: Arlington National Cemetery
- Military career
- Allegiance: United States
- Branch: United States Navy
- Service years: 1913–1950
- Rank: Admiral
- Nicknames: "Spike", "Waffle Nose", "Atomic Playboy"
- Commands: Atlantic Fleet
- Conflicts: Occupation of Veracruz; World War I; World War II; Battle of Iwo Jima
- Awards: Distinguished Service Medal (4)

William Henry Purnell Blandy (28 June 1890 – 12 January 1954), known to close associates as "Spike", was an admiral in the United States Navy during World War II.

== Biography ==
Born in New York City 28 June 1890, Blandy graduated first in his class from the United States Naval Academy in 1913. He participated in the occupation of Veracruz, Mexico in 1914 and served on board the battleship USS Florida with the British Grand Fleet during World War I.

During World War II he was Chief of the Bureau of Ordnance from 1941 to 1943. Here he had a controversial role in the infamous torpedo scandal involving the initially practically useless Mark 14 torpedo, and the long delays incurred on the work testing and launching the electric Mark 18 torpedo.

In December 1943 he became Commander, Group 1, Amphibious Force, Pacific Fleet, and commanded the pre-invasion bombardment group during the campaign for Iwo Jima.

One account of Admiral Blandy during the Iwo campaign recalls:

The USS Estes was positioned about two miles off-shore during the bombardment, and Admiral Blandy, being the old Gunnery type, kept ordering the captain to come in a little closer so he could "..see the whites of their eyes..". About the time we would be within a little less than a mile from the beaches, a battery of shore guns up on the side of Mount Surabachi would start taking pot-shots at us. Geysers of water would erupt on either side of the ship, and the voice of Vice Admiral Turner in overall charge of the campaign on the USS Mount McKinley — a sister ship to the USS Estes — would come in over the "TBS" ship-to-ship radio ordering Blandy to "...get your [censored] out of there before you get it blown off!". We would then back off to a safe distance, only to have the same thing happen a few hours later.

After the war he commanded Joint Task Force 1 during the atomic bomb tests at Bikini Atoll.

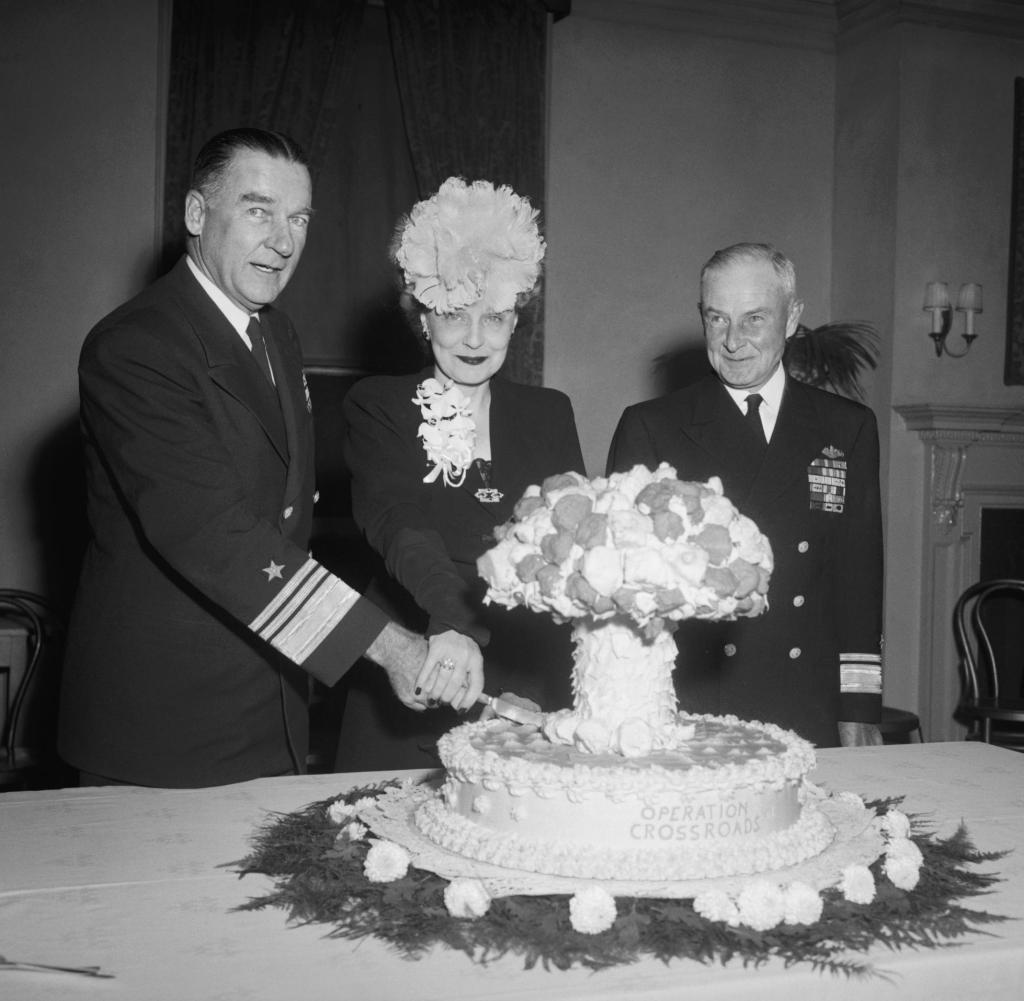
Vice Admiral Blandy and his wife cut the cake celebrating Operation Crossroads as Rear Admiral Frank J. Lowry looks on.

In mid to late 1945, Rear Admiral Blandy served as Commander, Destroyers, Pacific Fleet (ComDesPac).

In 1946, he made a famous speech in response to public criticism of the atomic bomb tests at Bikini Atoll:

"The bomb will not start a chain-reaction in the water, converting it all to gas, and letting all the ships on all the oceans drop down to the bottom. It will not blow out the bottom of the sea and let all the water run down the hole. It will not destroy gravity. I am not an atomic playboy, as one of my critics labelled me, exploding these bombs to satisfy my personal whim."

In late 1946, a minor controversy erupted over a published photo (shown at left) of Vice Admiral Blandy and his wife cutting an "atomic cake" in an event celebrating the disbandment of the team behind Operation Crossroads.

He commanded the 2nd Task Fleet and later served as Commander-in-Chief, Atlantic Fleet from 1947 to 1950.

Admiral Blandy retired in 1950 and died on 12 January 1954 from stroke at the U.S. Navy Hospital in St. Albans, New York, and was buried in Arlington National Cemetery.

== Namesake ==
In 1956, the destroyer USS Blandy (DD-943) was named in his honor.

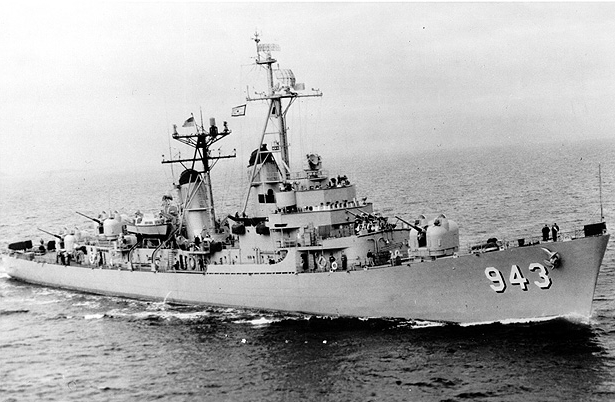
USS Blandy (DD-943)

== In popular culture ==
- Rock musician Steve Stevens used the original audio of Blandy's "I am not an atomic playboy" speech at the beginning of the opening and title track of his 1989 album Atomic Playboys.
- The sample also appears in "David Lange You Da Bomb!" by New Zealand musician Tiki Taane in 2009.
- The clip was also used by demogroup Future Crew in their demo Second Reality.
- The Dutch techno duo "Space Trax" have also used the sample in their 1991 single "Atomic Playboy"
