= Harry Asher Badt =

- Born: September 22, 1884; Tyler, Texas, U.S.
- Died: September 7, 1967 (aged 82)
- Military career
- Allegiance: United States
- Branch: United States Navy
- Service years: 1908–1947
- Rank: Commodore
- Commands: USS Simpson, USS Nokomis, USS Tuscaloosa
- Wars: Occupation of Nicaragua, Occupation of Veracruz, First World War, Second World War
- Awards: Legion of Merit

Harry Asher Badt (September 22, 1884 – September 7, 1967) was an American naval officer who served in both World War I and World War II.

== Military career ==
Harry Badt attended the U.S. Naval Academy and graduated in 1908. Some time after he was commissioned into the Navy, he served aboard the USS Annapolis in the Caribbean and off the coast of Mexico in 1912. He first saw action during the occupation of Nicaragua in 1912 and later during the occupation of Veracruz in 1914, still aboard the Annapolis.

=== First World War ===
After receiving his M.S. from Columbia University in 1916, Badt served aboard the USS Minneapolis and the USS Arizona during the First World War. Aboard the Minneapolis, Badt participated in convoy escort operations along the Atlantic coast and out into the open ocean to turn over the convoys to British destroyers. After being transferred to the USS Arizona in 1918, Badt and the rest of the crew trained heavily in Chesapeake until the ship departed for British waters on 18 November 1918.

=== Inter-War period ===
From 1923 to 1924, Badt commanded the USS Simpson in European waters before returning to the U.S. to begin serving aboard the USS Marblehead in until 1926. In 1926, Badt was served as an instructor at the Naval Academy, where he would teach until 1928 to take command of the USS Nokomis. Badt commanded the Nokomis until 1930, conducting oceanographic surveys of Mexican and Caribbean waters under the direction of the Hydrographic Office. He returned to his previous role as an instructor at Annapolis until 1933, when he was appointed Commanding Officer of the 1933 Aleutian Islands survey expedition. Shortly after returning from the Aleutian Islands expedition, Badt was placed in command of U.S. Navy recruiting operations from 1935-1937. After teaching at the Naval Academy, Badt went on to study at the Naval War College, from which he graduated in 1938.

=== Second World War ===
Following his graduation from the Naval War College, Badt went on to command the USS Tuscaloosa from July 1938 until December 1939. Under his command, the Tuscaloosa participated in Fleet problem XX and a goodwill tour along the coast of South America along with USS San Francisco and USS Quincy. Upon the outbreak of the Second World War in Europe in September 1939, the Tuscaloosa was assigned to the Neutrality Patrol for the rest of the year. Captain Badt was transferred prior to the Tuscaloosa's rescue of the German liner Columbus's crew in late December 1940. After just under two years in command of the USS Tuscaloosa, and with the U.S. entry into the Second World War looming, Badt was transferred to the Bureau of Naval Personnel as the director of Enlisted Personnel until 1942, when he was appointed director of Special Projects, position he would hold until after the war's end. During this time, Badt was promoted to the rank of Commodore and is credited with the construction of three Naval Training Stations in Sampson, New York, Bainbridge, Maryland, and Farragut, Idaho. He retired in 1947.

== Awards ==
Badt received the Legion of Merit for actions during World War II.

== Death ==
Harry Badt died on 7 September 1967. He is buried with his wife, Jennie Badt, at the Arlington National Cemetery.
