= USS Detroit (CL-8) =

Omaha-class light cruiser

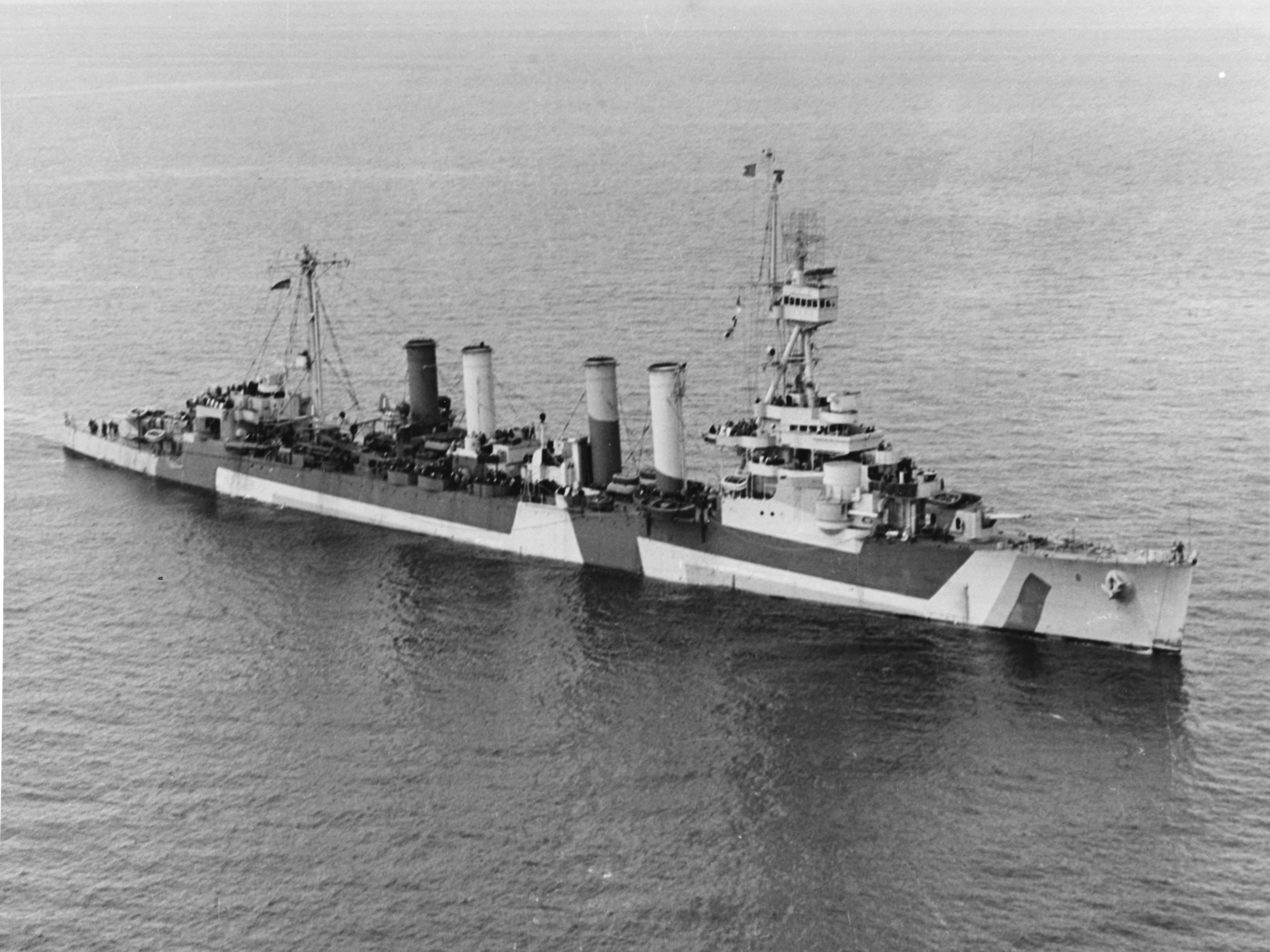
- USS Detroit (April 1944)

History

United States
- Name: Detroit
- Namesake: City of Detroit, Michigan
- Ordered: 4 March 1917
- Awarded: 21 August 1917; 12 June 1919 (supplementary contract)
- Builder: Bethlehem Shipbuilding Corporation's Fore River Shipyard, Quincy, Massachusetts
- Laid down: 10 November 1920
- Launched: 29 June 1922
- Sponsored by: Miss M. Couzens
- Completed: 1 November 1921
- Commissioned: 31 July 1923
- Decommissioned: 11 January 1946
- Stricken: 21 January 1946
- Identification: Hull symbol: CL-8; Code letters: NISP
- Fate: Sold for scrap 27 February 1946

General characteristics (as built)
- Class & type: Omaha-class light cruiser
- Displacement: 7,050 long tons (7,163 t) (standard); 9,508 long tons (9,661 t) (loaded)
- Length: 555 ft 6 in (169.32 m) oa; 550 ft (170 m) pp
- Beam: 55 ft (17 m)
- Draft: 14 ft 3 in (4.34 m) (mean)
- Installed power: 12 × Yarrow boiler; 90,000 ihp (67,000 kW) (Estimated power produced on trials)
- Propulsion: 4 × Curtis steam turbines; 4 × screws
- Speed: 35 knots (65 km/h; 40 mph); 33.7 knots (62.4 km/h; 38.8 mph) (Estimated speed on Trial)
- Crew: 29 officers 429 enlisted (peace time)
- Armament: 2 × twin 6 in (150 mm)/53 caliber guns; 8 × single 6 in/53 caliber guns; 4 × 3 in (76 mm)/50 caliber guns anti-aircraft; 2 × triple 21 in (533 mm) torpedo tubes; 2 × twin 21 in (533 mm) torpedo tubes; 224 × mines (removed soon after completion)
- Armor: Belt: 3 in (76 mm); Deck: 1 1/2 in (38 mm); Conning Tower: 1 1/2 in; Bulkheads: 1 1/2-3 in
- Aircraft carried: 2 × floatplanes
- Aviation facilities: 2 × Amidship catapults; crane

General characteristics (1945)
- Armament: 2 × twin 6 in/53 caliber; 4 × single 6 in/53 caliber; 8 × 3 in/50 caliber anti-aircraft guns; 2 × triple 21 in torpedo tubes; 5 × twin 40 mm (1.6 in) Bofors guns; 12 × single 20 mm (0.79 in) Oerlikon cannons

USS Detroit (CL-8) was an Omaha-class light cruiser, originally classified as a scout cruiser, of the United States Navy. She was the fourth Navy ship named for the city of Detroit, Michigan. She spent her first eight years as part of the Scouting Fleet either in the Atlantic or Mediterranean. Her first duty was to assist in the USAAS's first aerial circumnavigation of the world in 1924 and transported the United States Secretary of State Frank B. Kellogg, in 1927, from Ireland to France for the negotiations that led to the signing of the Kellogg-Briand Pact. In 1931 she joined the Battle Force, where her home port was San Diego until moving to Pearl Harbor in 1941. Detroit was moored next to her sister Raleigh when the Japanese attacked on the morning of 7 December 1941. She would remain in operation in Alaskan waters until 1945, where she would subsequently be moved into the Pacific theater, participating in the Battle of Okinawa and being present for the Japanese surrender. She would be sold for scrap in February of 1946.

== Built in Quincy, Massachusetts ==
Detroit ordered 4 March 1917 with the contract being awarded to Bethlehem Shipbuilding Corporation's Fore River Shipyard in Quincy, Massachusetts, on 21 August 1917. She was laid down on 10 November 1920 and launched 29 June 1922. Her sponsor was Miss M. Couzens, daughter of James J. Couzens, the Mayor of Detroit, Michigan. Detroit was commissioned on 31 July 1923, with Captain J. Halligan, Jr. in command.

Detroit was 550 feet (170 metres) long at the waterline with an overall length of 555 feet 6 inches (169.32 metres), her beam was 55 feet 4 inches (16.87 metres) and a mean draft of 13 feet 6 inches (4.11 metres). Her standard displacement was 7,050 long tons (7,160 t) and 9,508 long tons (9,661 t) at full load. Her crew, during peace time, consisted of 29 officers and 429 enlisted men.

Detroit was powered by four Curtis steam turbines geared steam turbines, each driving one screw, using steam generated by 12 Yarrow boilers. The engines were designed to produce 90,000 indicated horsepower (67,000 kW) and reach a top speed of 35 knots (65 km/h; 40 mph). She was designed to provide a range of 10,000 nautical miles (19,000 km; 12,000 mi) at a speed of 10 knots (19 km/h; 12 mph), but was only capable of 8,460 nautical miles (15,670 km; 9,740 mi) at a speed of 10 knots (19 km/h; 12 mph)

Detroit's main armament went through many changes while she was being designed. Originally she was to mount ten 6 in (150 mm)/53 caliber guns; two on either side at the waist, with the remaining eight mounted in tiered casemates on either side of the fore and aft superstructures. After America's entry into World War I the US Navy worked alongside the Royal Navy and it was decided to mount four 6-in/53 caliber guns in two twin gun turrets fore and aft and keep the eight guns in the tiered casemates so that she would have an eight gun broadside and, due to limited arcs of fire from the casemate guns, four to six guns firing fore or aft. Her secondary armament consisted of two 3 in (76 mm)/50 caliber anti-aircraft guns in single mounts. Detroit was initially built with the capacity to carry 224 mines, but these were removed early in her career to make way for more crew accommodations. She also carried two triple and two twin, above-water, torpedo tube mounts for 21 in (530 mm) torpedoes. The triple mounts were fitted on either side of the upper deck, aft of the aircraft catapults, and the twin mounts were one deck lower on either side, covered by hatches in the side of the hull.

The ship lacked a full-length waterline armor belt. The sides of her boiler and engine rooms and steering gear were protected by 3 inches (76 mm) of armor. The transverse bulkheads at the end of her machinery rooms were 1.5 inches (38 mm) thick forward and three inches thick aft. The deck over the machinery spaces and steering gear had a thickness of 1.5 inches. The gun turrets were not armored and only provided protection against muzzle blast and the conning tower had 1.5 inches of armor. Detroit carried two floatplanes aboard that were stored on the two catapults. Initially these were probably Vought VE-9s until the early 1930s when the ship may have operated OJ-2 until 1935 and Curtiss SOC Seagulls until 1940 when Vought OS2U Kingfishers were used on ships without hangars.

=== Armament changes ===
During her career Detroit went through several armament changes, some of these changes were to save weight, but others were to increase her AA armament. The lower torpedo tube mounts proved to be very wet and were removed, and the openings plated over, before the start of World War II. Another change made before the war was to increase the 3-inch guns to eight, all mounted in the ship's waist. After 1940, the lower aft 6-inch guns were removed and the casemates plated over for the same reason as the lower torpedo mounts, and in 1944, the upper fore 6-in guns were removed. The ship's anti-aircraft armament were augmented by five twin 40 mm (1.6 in) Bofors guns along with 12 20 mm (0.79 in) Oerlikon cannons by the end of the war.

== Inter-war period ==
After a shakedown cruise to the Mediterranean, Detroit joined the Scouting Fleet for exercises and maneuvers along the east coast and in the Mediterranean. From September–October 1924, she was on lifeguard station for the USAAS's round-the-world flight, then served as flagship for Commander, Light Cruiser Divisions until 23 November. After overhaul at Boston, she sailed on 2 February 1925 for the west coast and fleet maneuvers along the coast and in Hawaiian waters. She returned to Boston on 10 July with the Scouting Fleet.

As flagship for Commander, Light Cruiser Division 3, from July 1925 to March 1926 and July to December 1926, Detroit continued to participate in maneuvers and fleet problems along the east coast and in the Caribbean. From March–April 1927, she patrolled off the coast of Nicaragua to protect American interests during political disturbances there.

Detroit sailed from Boston on 16 June as flagship for Commander, US Naval Forces in Europe. She made goodwill visits to various ports in Europe, North Africa, and the Middle East, and received official visits from the Kings of Norway, Denmark, and Spain, and the President of the Irish Free State. She also transported Secretary of State Frank B. Kellogg between Ireland and France for the talks which led the following year to the signing of the Kellogg-Briand Peace Pact.

The cruiser returned to Norfolk, Virginia, on 12 September 1928, for duty with the Scouting Fleet, serving as flagship for Commander, Light Cruiser Divisions, from 6 July 1929 to 29 September 1930. In January 1931, she sailed for a combined fleet problem off Balboa, then became flagship for Commander, Destroyer Squadrons, Battle Force on 19 March 1931, based on San Diego, California. In 1931, Captain Nathan Post was placed in command. Detroit's operations included exercises along the west coast and maneuvers in Alaskan and Hawaiian waters. Except for a fleet problem in the Atlantic in 1934, she remained in the Pacific with the Battle Force, operating from her base at San Diego.

== World War II ==
In 1941, Detroit's home port became Pearl Harbor. She was moored at her base with Raleigh and Utah when the Japanese attacked on 7 December. The other two ships bore the brunt of an attack by six torpedo planes. Despite several strafing passes with dive bombers, Detroit was able to get underway safely and set up an anti-aircraft fire which accounted for three Japanese aircraft. One downed aircraft was responsible for setting the vessel USS Curtiss (AV-4) ablaze.The other landing near the cruiser USS Baltimore. During these passes Detroit sustained damage to the #1 stack and in the butcher shop beside stack #3. Detroit was assigned to Battle Group #1 aboard was the senior Admiral, Admiral Milo Draymo, Detroit was tasked with finding the Japanese fleet the following night Detroit had met up with the USS Enterprise. Only one of Detroit's crew members was injured during the Japanese attack, Lester Silva, who received a Purple Heart. Once clear of Pearl Harbor she was ordered to sail at once to join up with the light cruisers Phoenix and St. Louis and two destroyers to investigate the west coast of Oahu for any indications of a landing by the Japanese, then to join the search for the retiring Japanese force.

Returning to Pearl Harbor on 10 December, Detroit took up convoy escort duty between her home port and the West coast. On one of these voyages (on or after 3 March), she took 9 short tons (260,000 ozt; 8 metric tons) of gold and 13 short tons (350,000 ozt; 12 metric tons) of silver from Trout (which had evacuated it from Corregidor) and delivered them to the United States Treasury Department at San Francisco. In September 1942, Detroit escorted two convoys to Naval Station Tutuila in Pago Pago, American Samoa, rescuing the crew of a downed PBY Catalina during one passage.

Detroit sailed from San Francisco on 10 November 1942 for Kodiak, Alaska, to become flagship for Commander, Task Group 8.6 (TG 8.6), and patrol between Adak and Attu Islands to prevent further enemy penetration of the Aleutians. On 12 January 1943, she covered the unopposed landings made on Amchitka to gain a base from which to cut the Japanese Supply line, and after repairs at Bremerton from February–March, returned to patrol duty to intercept reinforcements trying to reach the Japanese garrisons on Kiska and Attu. In April, she bombarded Holtz Bay and Chichagof Harbor on Attu, returning the next month to join in the assault and capture of the island. In August, under the command of Captain H. G. Sickel, she took part in the bombardments of Kiska, then covered the landings of 15 August which revealed that the island had been secretly evacuated.

Detroit remained in Alaskan waters until 1944, operating with the covering group for the western Aleutian bases. In June, she saw action with Task Force 94 (TF 94) during the bombardment of shore installations in the Kuriles. She sailed from Adak on 25 June, and after repairs at Bremerton, arrived at Balboa, Panama on 9 August to serve as temporary flagship of the Southeast Pacific Force. She patrolled on the west coast of South America until December.

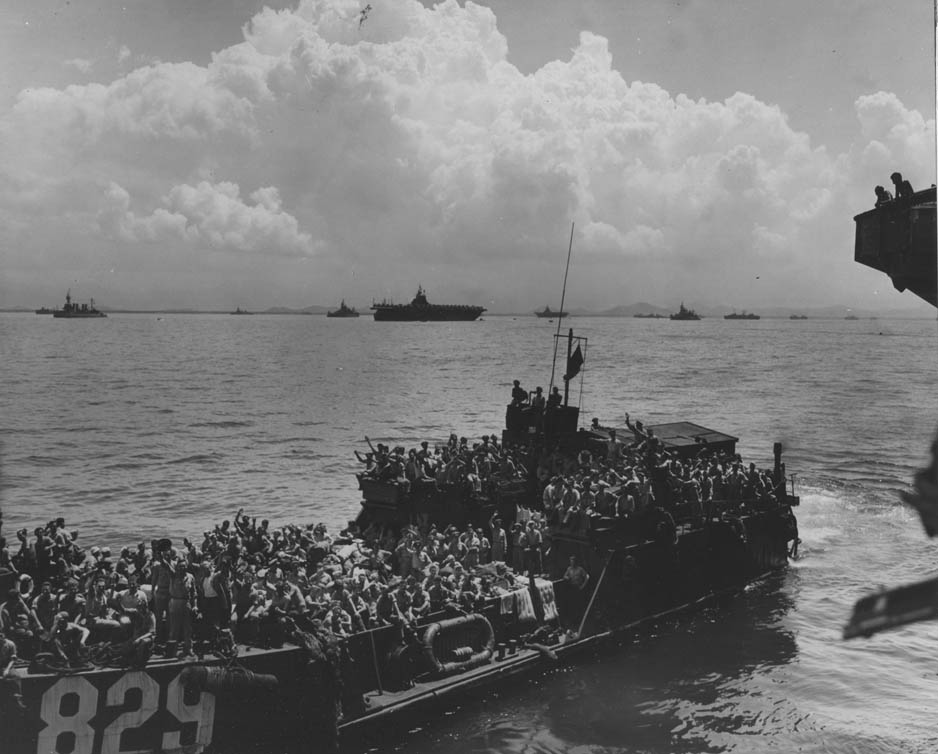
USS Detroit (CL-8), as a part of Air Group 12 departs on 17 June 1945.

Clearing San Francisco on 16 January 1945, Detroit arrived at Ulithi on 4 February for duty with the 5th Fleet. During Detroit's time she would provide support during the landings and battle of Iwo Jima. Before April 1, Detroit would be assigned to Task Group 50.8 as the flagship of the Logistics Support Group of the Fifth Fleet during the Battle of Okinawa. Detroit and Task Group 50.8 was commanded by Rear Admiral D. B. Beary covering Detroit and over 95 logistics ships. Detroit entered Tokyo Bay on 1 September. Detroit was one of two ships present at both Pearl Harbor on 7 December 1941 and the signing of the Japanese surrender (the other being West Virginia). Detroit continued to direct replenishment operations for the Occupation fleet and in addition, the repatriation of Japanese to the home islands from Pacific bases. She left Tokyo Bay on 15 October for the United States with returning servicemen on board, as part of Operation Magic Carpet.

Detroit was decommissioned at Philadelphia on 11 January 1946, and sold for scrap on 27 February.

== Awards ==
- American Defense Service Medal with "FLEET" clasp
- American Campaign Medal
- Asiatic-Pacific Campaign Medal with six battle stars
- World War II Victory Medal
- Navy Occupation Service Medal

== Legacy ==
Detroit Seamount of the Hawaiian-Emperor seamount chain is named after Detroit.
