= USS Marblehead (CL-12) =

Omaha-class light cruiser

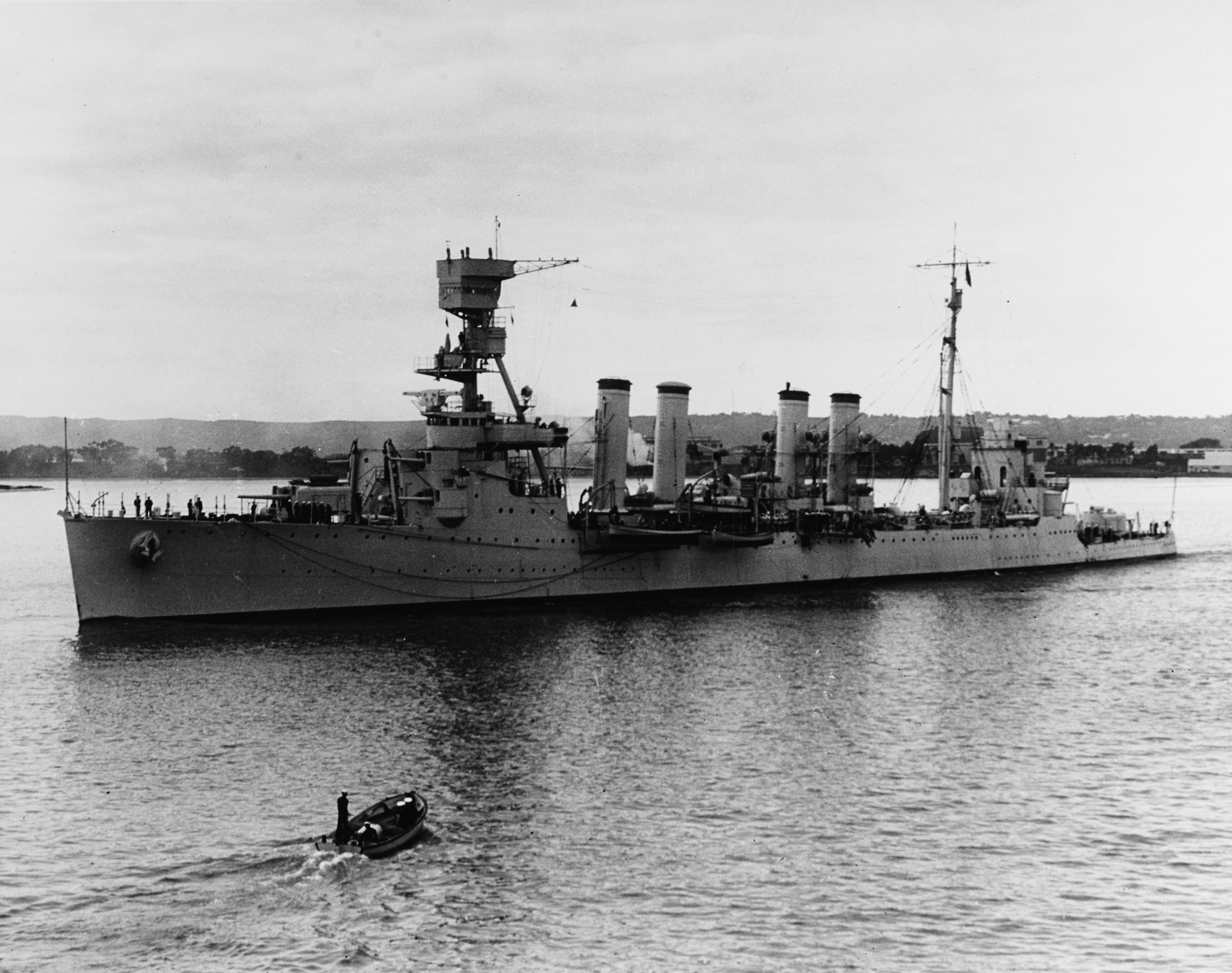
- USS Marblehead (1935)

History

United States
- Name: Marblehead
- Namesake: Town of Marblehead, Massachusetts
- Ordered: 1 July 1918
- Awarded: 24 January 1919
- Builder: William Cramp & Sons, Philadelphia
- Yard number: 502
- Laid down: 4 August 1920
- Launched: 9 October 1923
- Sponsored by: Mrs. Joseph Evans
- Completed: 1 January 1924
- Commissioned: 8 September 1924
- Decommissioned: 1 November 1945
- Stricken: 28 November 1945
- Identification: Hull symbol: CL-12; Code letters: NIRR
- Honors and awards: 2 × battle star
- Fate: Sold for scrap 27 February 1946

General characteristics (as built)
- Class & type: Omaha-class light cruiser
- Displacement: 7,050 long tons (7,163 t) (standard); 9,508 long tons (9,661 t) (loaded)
- Length: 555 ft 6 in (169.32 m) oa; 550 ft (167.6 m) pp
- Beam: 55 ft 4 in (16.87 m)
- Draft: 14 ft 3 in (4.34 m) (mean)
- Installed power: 12 × White-Forster boilers; 90,000 ihp (67,000 kW) (Estimated power produced on trials)
- Propulsion: 4 × Parsons steam turbines; 4 × screws
- Speed: 35 knots (65 km/h; 40 mph); 33.7 knots (62.4 km/h; 38.8 mph) (Estimated speed on Trial)
- Crew: 29 officers 429 enlisted (peace time)
- Armament: 2 × twin 6 in (150 mm)/53 caliber guns; 8 × single 6 in/53 caliber guns; 4 × 3 in (76 mm)/50 caliber guns anti-aircraft; 2 × triple 21 in (533 mm) torpedo tubes; 2 × twin 21 in torpedo tubes; 224 × mines (removed soon after completion)
- Armor: Belt: 3 in (76 mm); Deck: 1 1/2 in (38 mm); Conning Tower: 1 1/2 in; Bulkheads: 1 1/2-3 in
- Aircraft carried: 2 × floatplanes
- Aviation facilities: 2 × Amidship catapults; crane

General characteristics (1941)
- Armament: 2 × twin 6 in/53 caliber; 6 × single 6 in/53 caliber; 7 × 3 in/50 caliber anti-aircraft guns; 2 × triple 21 in torpedo tubes; 8 × .50 caliber (12.7 mm) machine guns

General characteristics (1945)
- Armament: 2 × twin 6 in/53 caliber; 6 × single 6 in/53 caliber; 8 × 3/ in/50 caliber anti-aircraft guns; 2 × triple 21 in torpedo tubes; 3 × twin 40 mm (1.6 in) Bofors guns; 12 × single 20 mm (0.79 in) Oerlikon cannons

USS Marblehead (CL-12) was an Omaha-class light cruiser, originally classified as a scout cruiser, of the United States Navy. She was the third Navy ship named for the town of Marblehead, Massachusetts.

== Built in Philadelphia, Pennsylvania ==
Marblehead was authorized on 1 July 1918, and assigned to William Cramp & Sons, Philadelphia on 24 January 1919. She was laid down on 4 August 1920, and launched on 9 October 1923, sponsored by Mrs. Joseph Evans. Marblehead was commissioned on 3 November 1923, with Captain Chauncey Shackford in command.

Marblehead was 550 feet (167.6 metres) long at the waterline with an overall length of 555 feet 6 inches (169.32 metres), her beam was 55 feet 4 inches (16.87 metres) and a mean draft of 13 feet 6 inches (4.11 metres). Her standard displacement was 7,050 long tons (7,160 t) and 9,508 long tons (9,661 t) at full load. Her crew, during peace time, consisted of 29 officers and 429 enlisted men.

Marblehead was powered by four Parsons geared steam turbines, each driving one screw, using steam generated by 12 White-Forster boilers. The engines were designed to produce 90,000 indicated horsepower (67,000 kW) and reach a top speed of 35 knots (65 km/h; 40 mph). She was designed to provide a range of 10,000 nautical miles (19,000 km; 12,000 mi) at a speed of 10 knots (19 km/h; 12 mph), but in service proved capable of only 8,460 nautical miles (15,670 km; 9,740 mi) at that speed.

Marblehead's main armament went through many changes while she was being designed. Originally she was to mount ten 6 in (150 mm)/53 caliber guns; two on either side at the waist, with the remaining eight mounted in tiered casemates on either side of the fore and aft superstructures. After America's entry into World War I the US Navy worked alongside the Royal Navy and it was decided to mount four 6-in/53 caliber guns in two twin gun turrets fore and aft and keep the eight guns in the tiered casemates so that she would have an eight gun broadside and, due to limited arcs of fire from the casemate guns, four to six guns firing fore or aft. Her secondary armament consisted of two 3 in (76 mm)/50 caliber anti-aircraft guns in single mounts. Marblehead was initially built with the capacity to carry 224 mines, but these were removed early in her career to make way for more crew accommodations. She also carried two triple and two twin, above-water, torpedo tube mounts for 21 in (530 mm) torpedoes. The triple mounts were fitted on either side of the upper deck, aft of the aircraft catapults, and the twin mounts were one deck lower on either side, covered by hatches in the side of the hull.

The ship lacked a full-length waterline armor belt. The sides of her boiler and engine rooms and steering gear were protected by 3 inches (76 mm) of armor. The transverse bulkheads at the end of her machinery rooms were 1.5 inches (38 mm) thick forward and three inches thick aft. The deck over the machinery spaces and steering gear had a thickness of 1.5 inches. The gun turrets were not armored and only provided protection against muzzle blast. The conning tower had 1.5 inches of armor. Marblehead carried two floatplanes aboard that were stored on the two catapults. Initially these were probably Vought VE-9s until the early 1930s when the ship may have operated the OJ-2 until 1935 and Curtiss SOC Seagulls until 1940 when Vought OS2U Kingfishers were used on ships without hangars.

=== Armament changes ===
During her career Marblehead went through several armament changes, some to save weight, and others to increase her AA armament. The lower torpedo tube mounts proved to be very wet and were removed, and the openings plated over, before the start of World War II. Another change made before the war was to increase the 3-inch guns to eight, all mounted in the ship's waist. After 1940, the lower aft 6 in (150 mm) guns were removed and the casemates plated over for the same reason as the lower torpedo mounts. During the Battle of Makassar Strait, Marblehead had seven 3-inch/50-caliber guns and eight .50 caliber machine guns, four mounted atop the foremast and another four aft. The ship's anti-aircraft armament had been augmented by three twin 40 mm (1.6 in) Bofors guns and twelve 20 mm (0.79 in) Oerlikon cannons by the end of the war.

== Inter-war period ==
After commissioning, Marblehead departed Boston for shakedown in the English Channel and Mediterranean. In 1925, she visited Australia, stopping en route in the Samoan and Society Islands and, on her return, in the Galápagos Islands. A year after her return, Marblehead was underway again on an extended voyage. Early in 1927, she cruised off Bluefields and Bragman's Bluffs, Nicaragua, her mission there to aid American efforts to bring together and reconcile the various political factions then fighting in that country. With one exception, Augusto César Sandino, faction leaders agreed to the terms of the Peace of Tipitapa on 4 May 1927, and the United States was requested to supervise elections in 1928.

Marblehead next sailed for Pearl Harbor, where she joined Cincinnati and Richmond and headed for Shanghai, China. Upon arrival there she contributed to the show of force aimed at the protection of American and other foreign nationals of Shanghai's international settlement during operations against that city through the summer of 1927, in China's civil war.

In addition to her stay at Shanghai, Marblehead spent two months up the Yangtze River at Hankow, and visited several Japanese ports before leaving the Far East in March 1928. En route home, the cruiser stopped at Corinto, Nicaragua to assist in the preparations for elections under the Peace of Tipitapa, delaying her return to Boston until August.

During the next decade Marblehead operated with both the Atlantic (August 1928-January 1933) and Pacific (February 1933–January 1938) Fleets. In January 1938, she was temporarily assigned to the Asiatic Fleet, receiving permanent assignment there seven months later. Home ported at Cavite, Philippine Islands, she cruised the Sea of Japan and the South and East China seas as tension, political and military, rapidly increased in the Far East.

== World War II ==
"About on 24 November 1941," her war diary reported, "the Commander–in–Chief, US Asiatic Fleet sensed that the relations between the United States and Japan had reached such a critical state that movement of men–of–war...was indicated." The next day, Marblehead, with Task Force 5 (TF 5), departed Manila Bay for seemingly "routine weekly operations." She anchored at Tarakan, Borneo on 29 November, and waited for further instructions. On 8 December, (7 December in the United States) she received the message "Japan started hostilities; govern yourselves accordingly."

=== Battle of Makassar Strait, 1942 ===
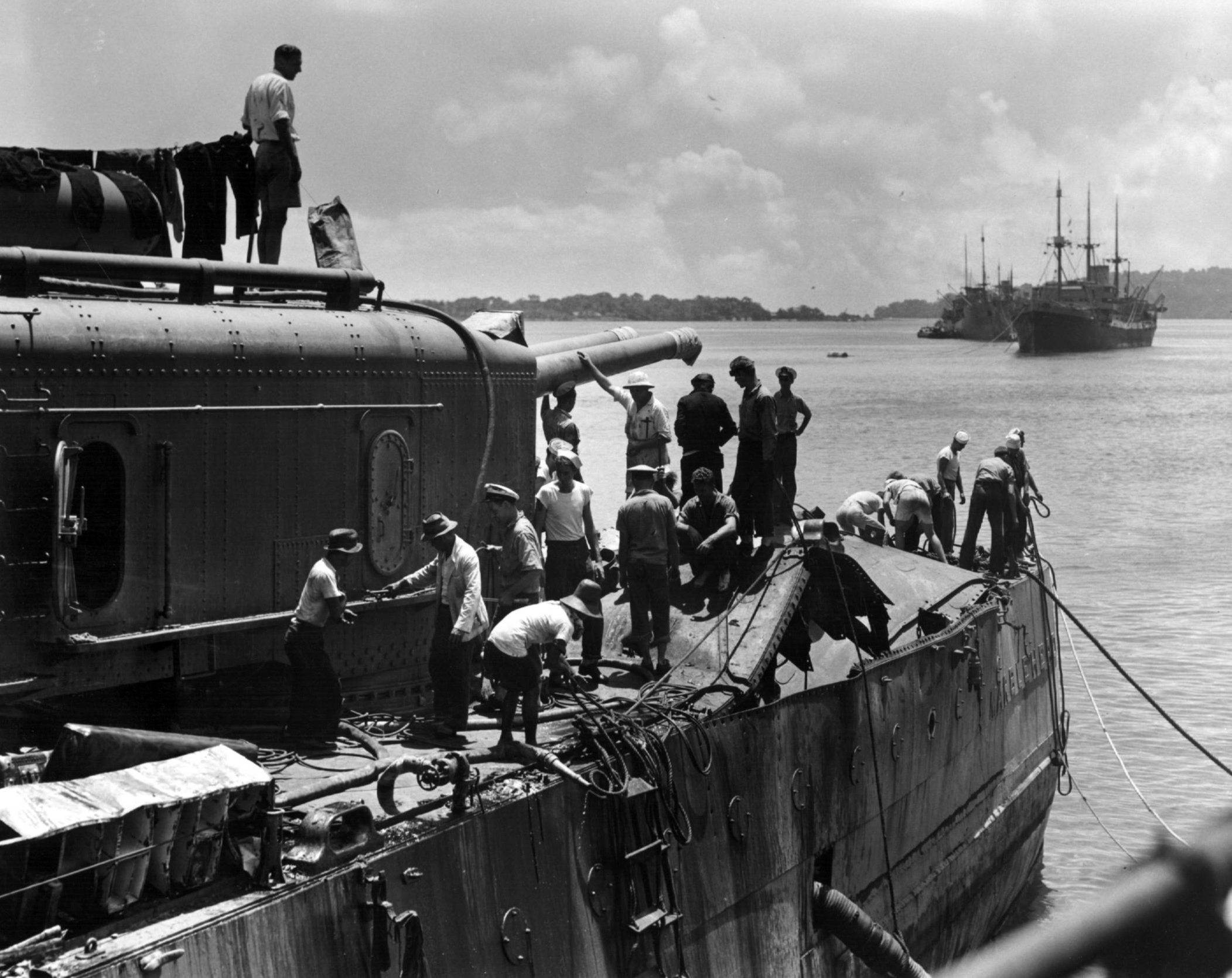
USS Marblehead in February 1942 showing bomb damage received in the Battle of Makassar Strait

Marblehead and other American warships then joined with those of the Royal Netherlands Navy and the Royal Australian Navy to patrol the waters surrounding the Netherlands East Indies and to screen Allied shipping moving south from the Philippines. On the night of 24 January 1942, Marblehead covered the withdrawal of a force of Dutch and American warships after they had attacked, with devastating effect, an enemy convoy off Balikpapan. Six days later, in an attempt to repeat this success, the force departed Surabaja, Java, to intercept an enemy convoy concentration at Kendari. The Japanese convoy, however, sailed soon after, and the Allied force changed course, anchoring in Bunda Roads on 2 February. On 4 February, the ships steamed out of Bunda Roads and headed for another Japanese convoy sighted at the southern entrance to the Makassar Straits. At 09:49, 36 enemy bombers were sighted closing in on the formation from the east.

In the ensuing Battle of Makassar Strait, Marblehead successfully maneuvered through three attacks. After the third, an enemy plane spiraled toward the cruiser, but her gunners shot it down. The next minute a fourth wave of seven bombers released bombs at Marblehead. Two were direct hits and a third a near miss close aboard the port bow causing severe underwater damage. Fires swept the ship as she listed to starboard and began to settle by the bow. Her rudder jammed, Marblehead, continuing to steam at full speed, circled to port. Her gunners kept firing, while damage control crews fought the fires and helped the wounded. By 1100, the fires were under control. Before noon the enemy planes departed, leaving the damaged cruiser with 15 dead or mortally wounded and 84 seriously injured.

Marblehead's engineers soon released the rudder angle to 9° left, and at 12:55, she retired to Tjilatjap, steering by working the engines at varying speeds. She made Tjilatjap with a forward draft of 30 feet (9.1 m), aft 22 feet (6.7 m). Unable to be docked there, her worst leaks were repaired and she put to sea again on 13 February. Some of her wounded crew were taken off the ship to be cared for by Dr Corydon M. Wassell; he received the Navy Cross for protecting them from capture by the invading Japanese. When the ship left Tjilatjap it was on the first leg of a voyage of more than 21,589 miles (34,744 km) in search of complete repairs.

Still steering with her engines, she made Trincomalee, Ceylon on 21 February. Repairs could not be made there or anywhere in India for several weeks, so Marblehead departed for South Africa on 2 March. After touching at Durban and Port Elizabeth, Marblehead arrived at Simonstown on 24 March. There she underwent extensive repairs and on 15 April, sailed for New York. Steaming via Recife, Brazil, she finally arrived in New York on 4 May, completing a journey of over 16,000 miles (26,000 km) from where she was damaged in action and immediately entered drydock at the Brooklyn Navy Yard.

=== Atlantic, Mediterranean, 1942–1944 ===
On 15 October, the rebuilt Marblehead again put to sea. Attached to the South Atlantic Force, she operated against the enemy in the South Atlantic from Recife and Bahia, Brazil, until February 1944. Returning to New York on 20 February, she operated along the convoy lanes of the North Atlantic for the next five months. She then sailed for the Mediterranean. Arriving at Palermo on 29 July, she joined the task force then staging for Operation Dragoon, the invasion of southern France. From 15 to 17 August, the cruiser bombarded enemy installations in the vicinity of Saint Raphael, where Allied assault troops were landing. On 18 August, she withdrew to Corsica, her mission complete.

== End of career ==
Marblehead returned to the United States, conducted a summer training cruise for Naval Academy midshipmen and then entered the Philadelphia Naval Shipyard, where she decommissioned on 1 November 1945. Her name was struck from the Naval Vessel Register on 28 November, and her hull was scrapped on 27 February 1946.

== Awards ==
- European–African–Middle Eastern Campaign Medal with one battle star for World War II service
- Asiatic-Pacific Campaign Medal with one battle star for World War II service
