= USS Memphis (CL-13) =

Omaha-class light cruiser

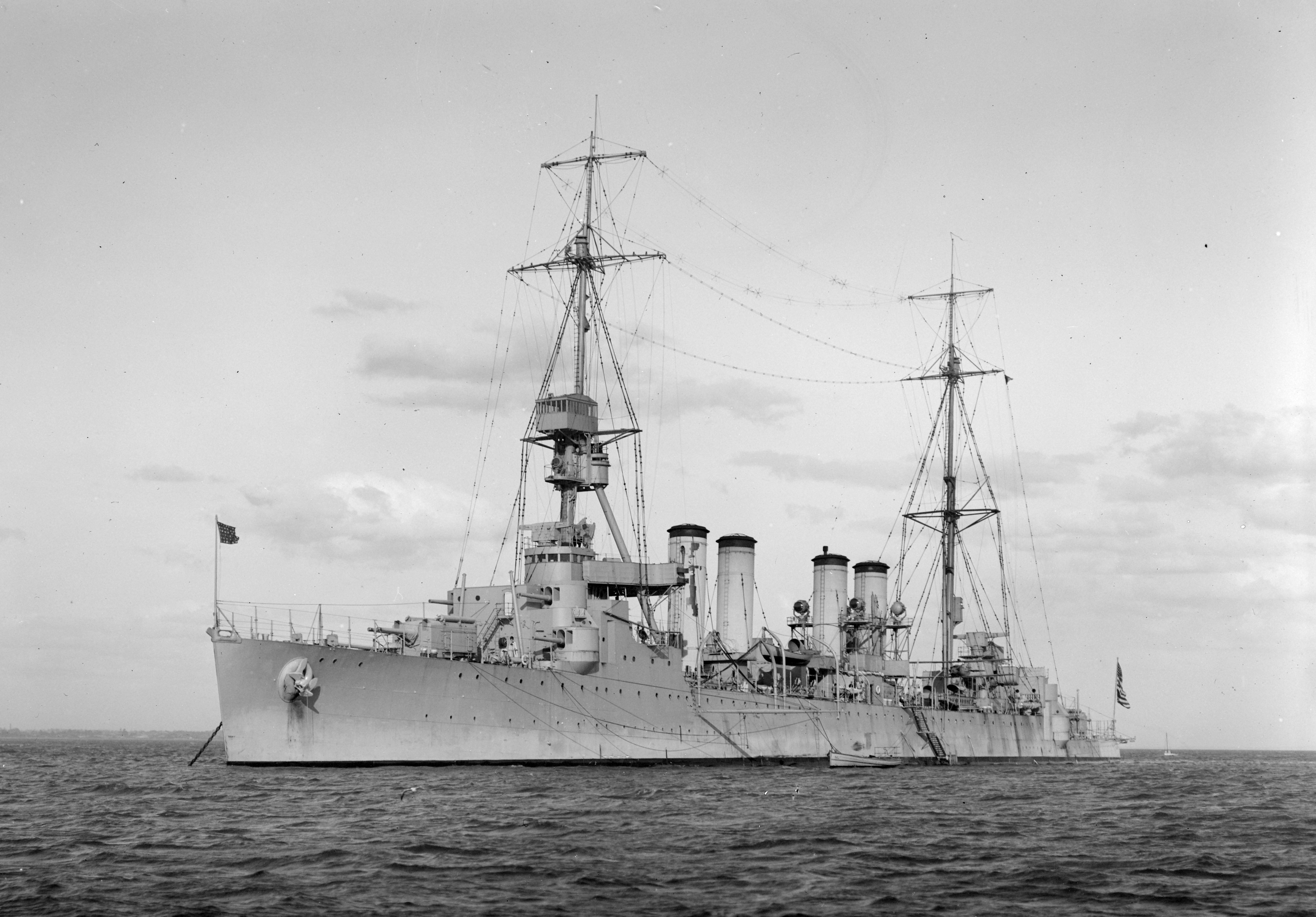
- USS Memphis (1925)

History

United States
- Name: Memphis
- Namesake: City of Memphis, Tennessee
- Ordered: 1 July 1918
- Awarded: 24 January 1919
- Builder: William Cramp & Sons, Philadelphia
- Yard number: 503
- Laid down: 14 October 1920
- Launched: 17 April 1924
- Sponsored by: Miss Elizabeth R. Paine
- Completed: 1 April 1922
- Commissioned: 4 February 1925
- Decommissioned: 17 December 1945
- Stricken: 8 January 1946
- Identification: Hull symbol: CL-13; Code letters: NISS
- Fate: Scrapped at Baltimore, 1947

General characteristics (as built)
- Class & type: Omaha-class light cruiser
- Displacement: 7,050 long tons (7,163 t) (standard); 9,508 long tons (9,661 t) (loaded)
- Length: 555 ft 6 in (169.32 m) oa; 550 ft (170 m) pp
- Beam: 55 ft (17 m)
- Draft: 14 ft 3 in (4.34 m) (mean)
- Installed power: 12 × White-Forster boilers; 90,000 ihp (67,000 kW) (Estimated power produced on trials)
- Propulsion: 4 × Parsons steam turbines; 4 × screws
- Speed: 35 knots (65 km/h; 40 mph); 33.7 knots (62.4 km/h; 38.8 mph) (Estimated speed on Trial)
- Crew: 29 officers 429 enlisted (peace time)
- Armament: 2 × twin 6 in (150 mm)/53 caliber guns; 8 × single 6 in/53 caliber guns; 4 × 3 in (76 mm) caliber anti-aircraft guns; 2 × triple 21 in (533 mm) torpedo tubes; 2 × twin 21 in torpedo tubes; 224 × mines (removed soon after completion)
- Armor: Belt: 3 in (76 mm); Deck: 1 1/2 in (38 mm); Conning Tower: 1 1/2 in; Bulkheads: 1 1/2-3 in
- Aircraft carried: 2 × floatplanes
- Aviation facilities: 2 × Amidship catapults; crane

General characteristics (1945)
- Armament: 2 × twin 6 in/53 caliber; 6 × single 6 in/53 caliber; 7 × 3 in/50 caliber anti-aircraft guns; 2 × triple 21 in torpedo tubes; 2 × twin 40 mm (1.6 in) Bofors guns; 12 × single 20 mm (0.79 in) Oerlikon cannons

USS Memphis (CL-13) was an Omaha-class light cruiser, originally classified as a scout cruiser, of the United States Navy. She was the fourth Navy ship named for the city of Memphis, Tennessee.

One of the noted events of the ship was to do VIP transport, including Charles Lindbergh in 1927 to receive the Distinguished Flying Cross from President Calvin Coolidge, and President Franklin D. Roosevelt from the Casablanca conference in 1943, taking him to a flying boat for a transatlantic flight.

== Built in Philadelphia, Pennsylvania ==
Memphis was authorized on 1 July 1918, and assigned to William Cramp & Sons, Philadelphia on 24 January 1919. She was laid down on 14 October 1920, and launched on 17 April 1924, sponsored by Miss Elizabeth R. Paine, daughter of Mayor Rowlett Paine of Memphis. Memphis was commissioned on 4 February 1925, with future Admiral, Captain Henry E. Lackey in command.

Memphis was 550 feet (170 metres) long at the waterline with an overall length of 555 feet 6 inches (169.32 metres), her beam was 55 feet 4 inches (16.87 metres) and a mean draft of 13 feet 6 inches (4.11 metres). Her standard displacement was 7,050 long tons (7,160 t) and 9,508 long tons (9,661 t) at full load. Her crew, during peace time, consisted of 29 officers and 429 enlisted men.

Memphis was powered by four Parsons steam turbines geared steam turbines, each driving one screw, using steam generated by 12 White-Forster boilers. The engines were designed to produce 90,000 indicated horsepower (67,000 kW) and reach a top speed of 35 knots (65 km/h; 40 mph). She was designed to provide a range of 10,000 nautical miles (19,000 km; 12,000 mi) at a speed of 10 knots (19 km/h; 12 mph), but was only capable of 8,460 nautical miles (15,670 km; 9,740 mi) at a speed of 10 knots (19 km/h; 12 mph)

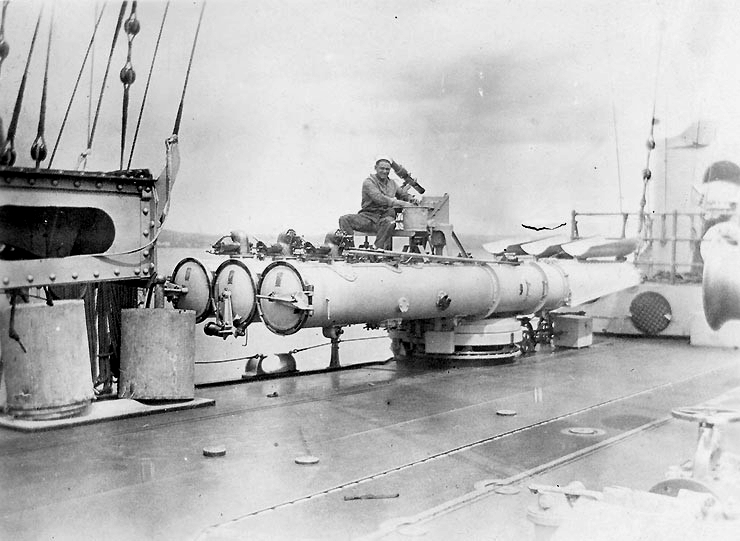
USS Memphis (CL-13) deck torpedo launcher

Memphis's main armament went through many changes while she was being designed. Originally she was to mount ten 6 in (150 mm)/53 caliber guns; two on either side at the waist, with the remaining eight mounted in tiered casemates on either side of the fore and aft superstructures. After America's entry into World War I the US Navy worked alongside the Royal Navy and it was decided to mount four 6-in/53 caliber guns in two twin gun turrets fore and aft and keep the eight guns in the tiered casemates so that she would have an eight gun broadside and, due to limited arcs of fire from the casemate guns, four to six guns firing fore or aft. Her secondary armament consisted of two 3 in (76 mm)/50 caliber anti-aircraft guns in single mounts. Memphis was initially built with the capacity to carry 224 mines, but these were removed early in her career to make way for more crew accommodations. She also carried two triple and two twin, above-water, torpedo tube mounts for 21 in (530 mm) torpedoes. The triple mounts were fitted on either side of the upper deck, aft of the aircraft catapults, and the twin mounts were one deck lower on either side, covered by hatches in the side of the hull.

The ship lacked a full-length waterline armor belt. The sides of her boiler and engine rooms and steering gear were protected by 3 inches (76 mm) of armor. The transverse bulkheads at the end of her machinery rooms were 1.5 inches (38 mm) thick forward and three inches thick aft. The deck over the machinery spaces and steering gear had a thickness of 1.5 inches. The gun turrets were not armored and only provided protection against muzzle blast and the conning tower had 1.5 inches of armor. Memphis carried two floatplanes aboard that were stored on the two catapults. Initially these were probably Vought VE-9s until the early 1930s when the ship may have operated OJ-2 until 1935 and Curtiss SOC Seagulls until 1940 when Vought OS2U Kingfishers were used on ships without hangars.

=== Armament changes ===
During her career Memphis went through several armament changes, some of these changes were to save weight, but others were to increase her AA armament. The lower torpedo tube mounts proved to be very wet and were removed, and the openings plated over, before the start of World War II. Another change made before the war was to increase the number of 3-inch guns to seven, all mounted in the ship's waist. After 1940, the lower aft 6 in (150 mm) guns were removed and the casemates plated over for the same reason as the lower torpedo mounts. The ship's anti-aircraft armament were augmented by two twin 40 mm (1.6 in) Bofors guns along with 12 20 mm (0.79 in) Oerlikon cannons by the end of the war.

== Inter-war period ==
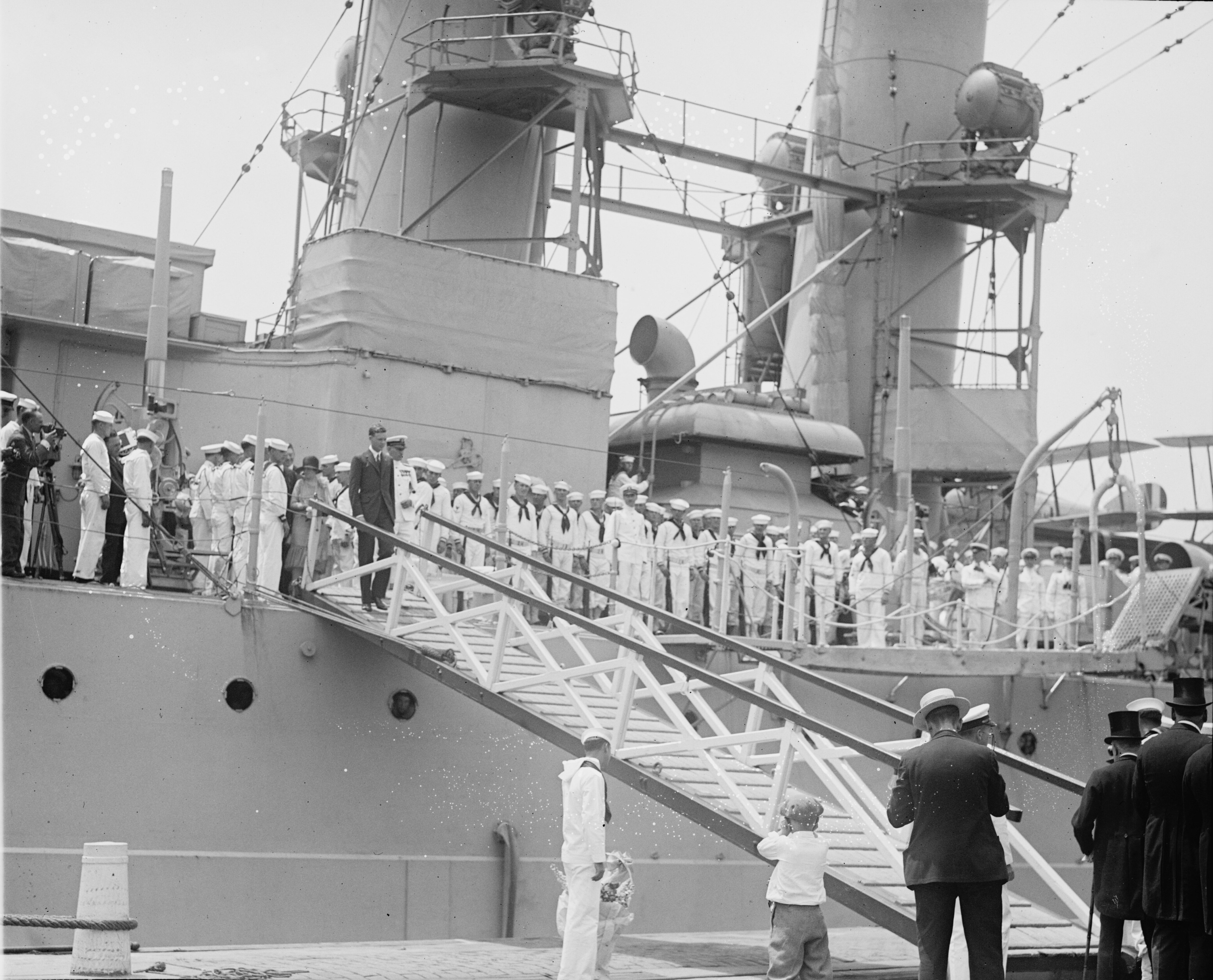
Lindbergh arrives at Navy Yard on the USS Memphis, 1927

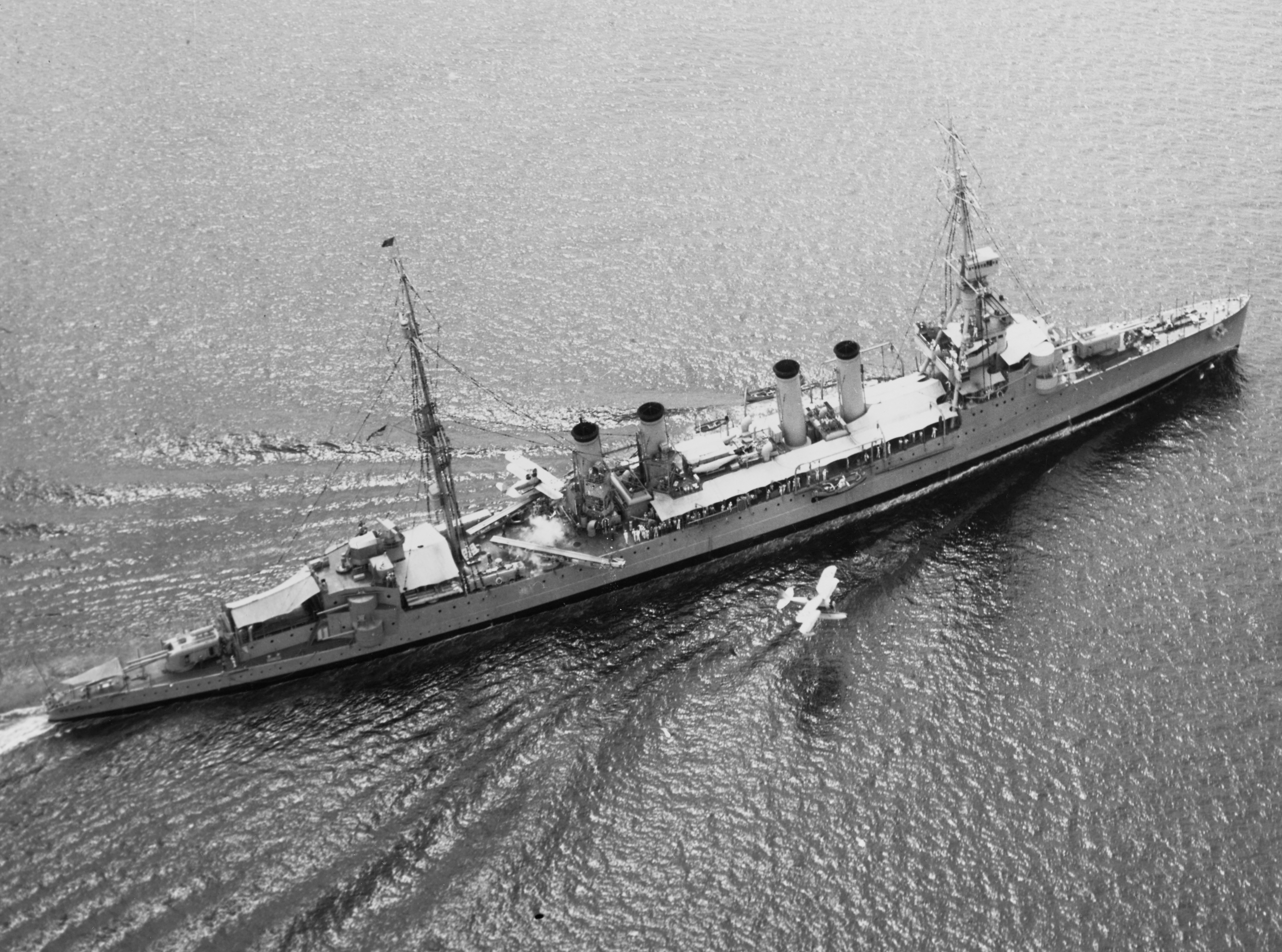
The Memphis catapults a Vought O2U Corsair floatplane during fleet maneuvers on 10 May 1933.

Late in February, Memphis got underway for a shakedown cruise in the Caribbean. On 13 April, the cruiser participated in the dedication of an American memorial gateway to Commodore Oliver Hazard Perry at Port of Spain, Trinidad. Six years after the indomitable Perry had defeated the British on Lake Erie on 10 September 1813, he died on board frigate John Adams at Port–of–Spain and was interred there until his remains were removed to Newport, R.I. seven years later. In June, Memphis joined ships of a scouting fleet off Honolulu, Hawaii, for a cruise to the South Pacific through September, with visits to Australia and New Zealand. From October 1925 to April 1926, she again operated in the West Indies before returning to her home port, New York City.

Memphis next sailed for Europe, arriving off St. Nazaire, France on 26 June 1926, and relieved Pittsburgh as the flagship of Commander, US Naval Forces in Europe on 4 July. The new Commander, US Naval Forces in Europe was Vice-Admiral Guy Burrage. Vice-Admiral Burrage served as Commander, US Naval Forces in Europe from 1926 to 1928. Memphis operated in European waters into 1927. During a stay at Santander, Spain from 31 July to 31 August 1926, the ship was visited by King Alfonso XIII.

On 3 June 1927, Memphis embarked Captain Charles A. Lindbergh and his aeroplane 'Spirit of St Louis' at Southampton, England, following his nonstop flight from New York to Paris. The next day the cruiser departed Cherbourg, France, arriving Washington, D.C., on 11 June, to debark her famous passenger at the Washington Navy Yard. For the rest of the year she performed surveillance duty along the Atlantic coast.

In January 1928, Memphis acted as part of an escort group for President Calvin Coolidge on a cruise to the West Indies. After four months of Caribbean operations, she served in the western Pacific as part of Light Cruiser Division TWO attached to the Asiatic Fleet along with Milwaukee and Trenton.

On 5 June, the cruiser arrived at Balboa, Canal Zone for duty off Central America to May 1933. Memphis operated in a peacekeeping capacity at Corinto, Nicaragua, during the inauguration of President Juan Bautista Sacasa in 1932. In the next five years she alternated duty along the west coast with patrols to the troubled area of the West Indies.

After a good will cruise to Australia in January 1938, Memphis reached Honolulu on 1 April, to rejoin the fleet for operations until she participated in the presidential review off San Francisco on 12 July 1939. In August, she sailed to Alaska, operating there until early 1941.

== World War II ==
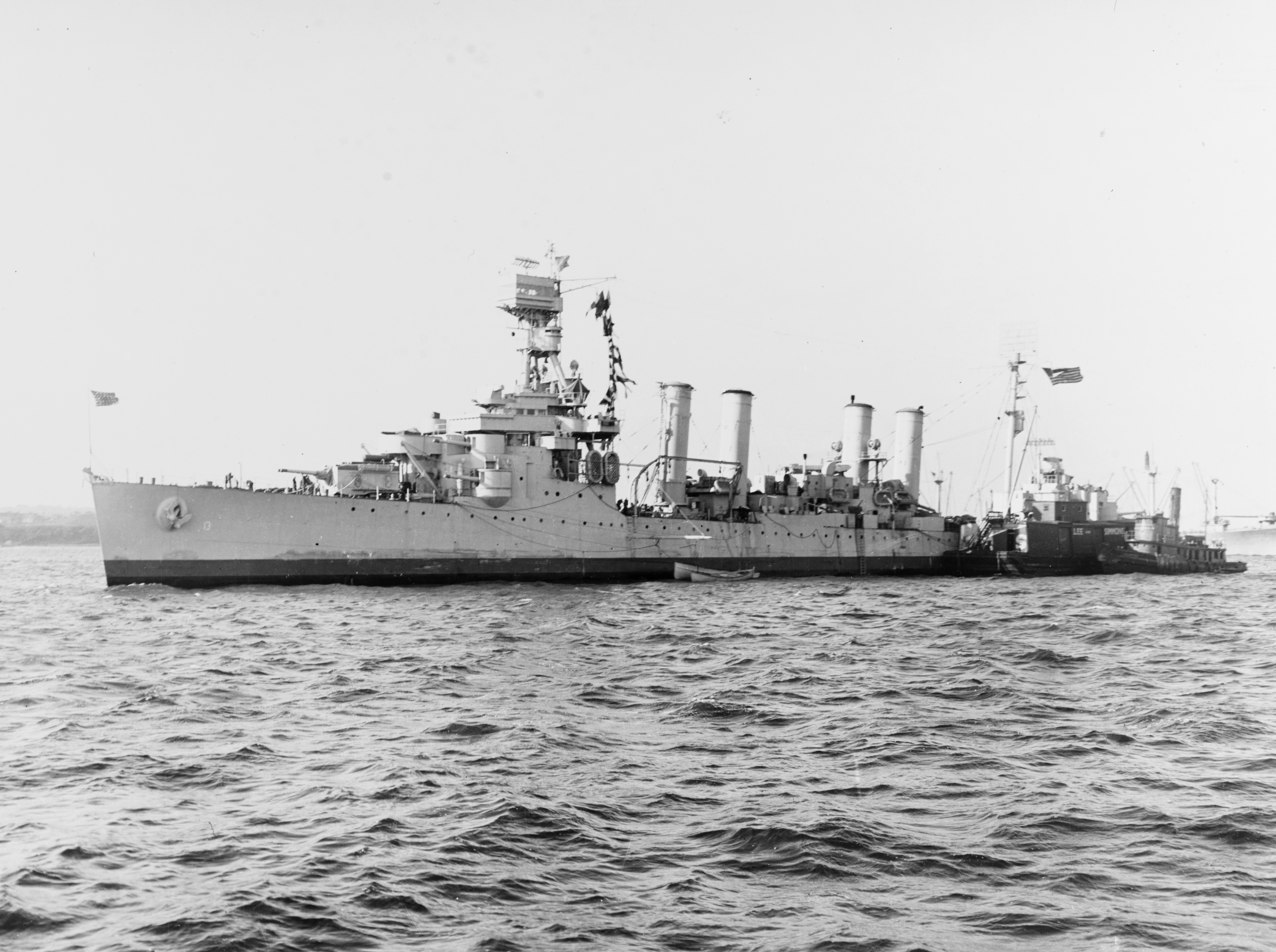
USS Memphis (CL-13) near New York City, November 1942

As the time of US involvement in World War II approached, Memphis sailed to the east coast. She departed Newport on 24 April 1941, to take part in the neutrality patrol of the ocean triangle Trinidad–Cape San Roque–Cape Verde Islands, arriving Recife, Brazil, on 10 May. She continued operations in the South Atlantic for most of the war. In March 1942, the ship escorted two Army transports in convoy to Ascension Island, where the Army's 38th Engineer General Service Regiment debarked to construct an airport as staging point for planes flying from the United States to Africa. By May, she was on patrol near the entrance to Fort-de-France, Martinique.

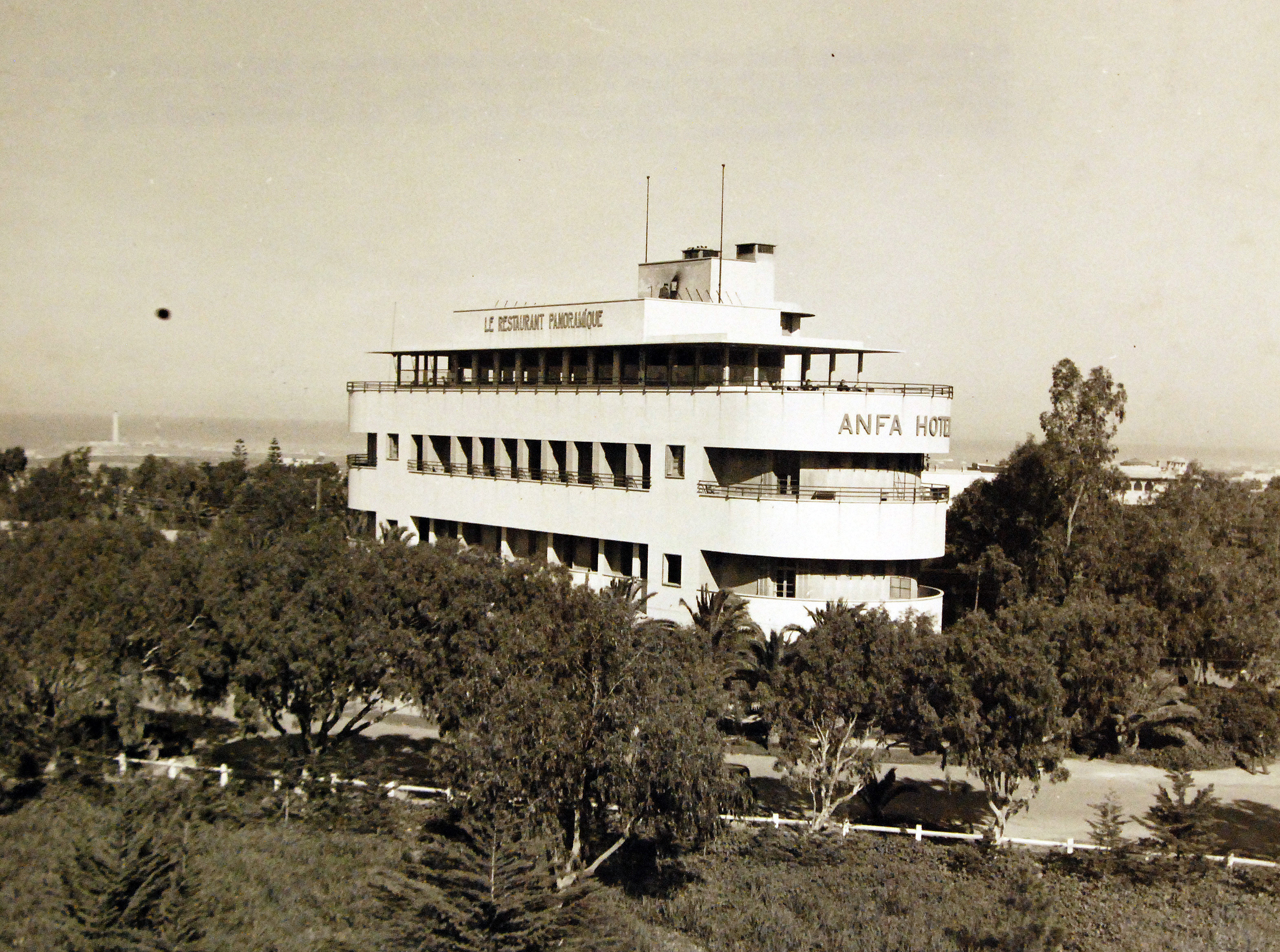
The Anfa-Hotel, Casablanca

In January 1943, the cruiser flew President Franklin Delano Roosevelt's flag off Bathurst, Gambia, during the Casablanca Conference from 14 to 24 January. The President and British Prime Minister Winston Churchill outlined plans at that time for the invasion of Sicily and Italy. From February–September, Memphis was once more on patrol duty against blockade runners, mostly off Bahia and Recife, Brazil.

President Amenzoga of Uruguay, and President Getúlio Vargas of Brazil toured the ship in January 1944, while their countries continued to give valuable aid in blockading the "Atlantic Narrows". The following year Memphis sailed for Europe, arriving Naples, Italy, on 16 January 1945. On 27 January, as flagship for Admiral Harold R. Stark, Commander, US Naval Forces in Europe, she got underway for Valletta, Malta, scene of preliminary Allied conferences prior to the Yalta Conference in February. Before the end of January the cruiser had two important visitors: Fleet Admiral Ernest J. King and General of the Army George C. Marshall.

On 18 February, Memphis arrived at Algiers for President Roosevelt's last Allied conference before his return to the United States. For the next eight months, she continued to receive distinguished leaders. She participated in the first anniversary ceremonies of the Allied landings at St. Raphael and St. Tropez, southern France on 15 August, and the Navy Day festivities at Naples, Italy, on 27 October. Late in November, Memphis departed Tangier for Philadelphia, where she decommissioned on 17 December. She was struck from the Naval Vessel Register on 8 January 1946, and sold to Patapsco Scrap Co., Bethlehem, Pa. on 18 December, for scrapping following delivery on 10 January 1947.

== Awards ==
- American Defense Service Medal with "A" device
- American Campaign Medal
- European-African-Middle Eastern Campaign Medal
- World War II Victory Medal

== See also ==
- Vice admiral James L. Kauffman, Navy Cross recipient and Commanding officer of Memphis in 1936.
