= Henry Lackey =

Henry Lackey may refer to:

- Henry E. Lackey, rear admiral in the United States Navy
- Henry G. Lackey, American politician from Kentucky
