= USS Richmond (CL-9) =

Omaha-class light cruiser

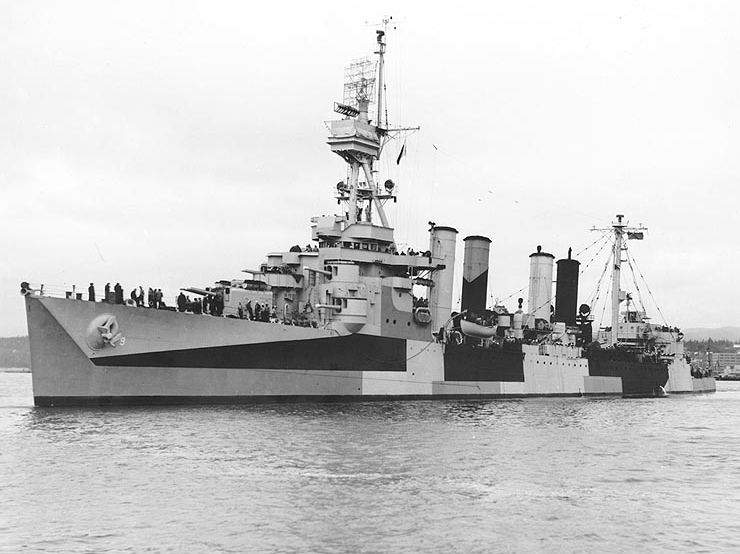
- USS Richmond (June 1944)

History

United States
- Name: Richmond
- Namesake: City of Richmond, Virginia
- Ordered: 29 August 1916; 4 March 1917
- Awarded: 30 July 1917; 11 July 1919 (supplementary contract)
- Builder: William Cramp & Sons, Philadelphia
- Yard number: 448
- Laid down: 16 February 1920
- Launched: 29 September 1921
- Sponsored by: Miss Elizabeth S. Scott
- Commissioned: 2 July 1923
- Decommissioned: 21 December 1945
- Stricken: 21 January 1946
- Identification: Hull symbol:CL-9; Code letters:NISQ
- Honors and awards: 2 × battle star
- Fate: Sold for scrap 18 December 1946; Scrapped at Baltimore 1947

General characteristics (as built)
- Class & type: Omaha-class light cruiser
- Displacement: 7,050 long tons (7,163 t) (standard); 9,508 long tons (9,661 t) (loaded)
- Length: 555 ft 6 in (169.32 m) oa; 550 ft (170 m) pp
- Beam: 55 ft (17 m)
- Draft: 14 ft 3 in (4.34 m) (mean)
- Installed power: 12 × White-Forster boilers; 90,000 ihp (67,000 kW) (Estimated power produced on trials)
- Propulsion: 4 × Parsons steam turbines; 4 × screws
- Speed: 35 knots (65 km/h; 40 mph); 33.7 knots (62.4 km/h; 38.8 mph) (Estimated speed on Trial)
- Crew: 29 officers 429 enlisted (peace time)
- Armament: 2 × twin 6 in (150 mm)/53 caliber guns; 8 × single 6 in/53 caliber guns; 4 × 3 in (76 mm)/50 caliber guns anti-aircraft; 2 × triple 21 in (533 mm) torpedo tubes; 2 × twin 21 in torpedo tubes; 224 × mines (removed soon after completion)
- Armor: Belt: 3 in (76 mm); Deck: 1 1/2 in (38 mm); Conning Tower: 1 1/2 in; Bulkheads: 1 1/2-3 in
- Aircraft carried: 2 × floatplanes
- Aviation facilities: 2 × Amidship catapults; crane

General characteristics (1945)
- Armament: 2 × twin 6 in/53 caliber; 6 × single 6 in/53 caliber; 8 × 3 in/50 caliber anti-aircraft guns; 2 × triple 21 in torpedo tubes; 3 × twin 40 mm (1.6 in) Bofors guns; 12 × single 20 mm (0.79 in) Oerlikon cannons

USS Richmond (CL-9) was an Omaha-class light cruiser, originally classified as a scout cruiser, of the United States Navy. She was the third Navy ship named for the city of Richmond, Virginia.

== Built in Philadelphia, Pennsylvania ==
Richmond was originally authorized on 29 August 1916, and awarded to William Cramp & Sons, Philadelphia on 30 July 1917. She was laid down on 16 February 1920, and launched on 29 September 1921, sponsored by Miss Elizabeth S. Scott. Richmond was commissioned on 2 July 1923, with Captain David F. Boyd in command.

=== Characteristics ===
Richmond was 550 feet (170 metres) long at the waterline with an overall length of 555 feet 6 inches (169.32 metres), her beam was 55 feet 4 inches (16.87 metres) and a mean draft of 13 feet 6 inches (4.11 metres). Her standard displacement was 7,050 long tons (7,160 t) and 9,508 long tons (9,661 t) at full load. Her crew, during peace time, consisted of 29 officers and 429 enlisted men.

=== Power plant ===
Richmond was powered by four Parsons geared steam turbines, each driving one screw, using steam generated by 12 White-Forster boilers. The engines were designed to produce 90,000 indicated horsepower (67,000 kW) and reach a top speed of 35 knots (65 km/h; 40 mph). She was designed to provide a range of 10,000 nautical miles (19,000 km; 12,000 mi) at a speed of 10 knots (19 km/h; 12 mph), but was only capable of 8,460 nautical miles (15,670 km; 9,740 mi) at a speed of 10 knots (19 km/h; 12 mph)

=== Original armament ===
Richmond's main armament went through many changes while she was being designed. Originally she was to mount ten 6 in (150 mm)/53 caliber guns; two on either side at the waist, with the remaining eight mounted in tiered casemates on either side of the fore and aft superstructures. After America's entry into World War I the US Navy worked alongside the Royal Navy and it was decided to mount four 6-in/53 caliber guns in two twin gun turrets fore and aft and keep the eight guns in the tiered casemates so that she would have an eight gun broadside and, due to limited arcs of fire from the casemate guns, four to six guns firing fore or aft. Her secondary armament consisted of two 3 in (76 mm)/50 caliber anti-aircraft guns in single mounts. Richmond was initially built with the capacity to carry 224 mines, but these were removed early in her career to make way for more crew accommodations. She also carried two triple and two twin, above-water, torpedo tube mounts for 21 in (530 mm) torpedoes. The triple mounts were fitted on either side of the upper deck, aft of the aircraft catapults, and the twin mounts were one deck lower on either side, covered by hatches in the side of the hull.

The ship lacked a full-length waterline armor belt. The sides of her boiler and engine rooms and steering gear were protected by 3 inches (76 mm) of armor. The transverse bulkheads at the end of her machinery rooms were 1.5 inches (38 mm) thick forward and three inches thick aft. The deck over the machinery spaces and steering gear had a thickness of 1.5 inches. The gun turrets were not armored and only provided protection against muzzle blast and the conning tower had 1.5 inches of armor. Richmond carried two floatplanes aboard that were stored on the two catapults. Initially these were probably Vought VE-9s until the early 1930s when the ship may have operated OJ-2 until 1935 and Curtiss SOC Seagulls until 1940 when Vought OS2U Kingfishers were used on ships without hangars.

=== Armament changes ===
During her career Richmond went through several armament changes, some of these changes were save weight, but others were to increase her AA armament. The lower torpedo tube mounts proved to be very wet and were removed, and the openings plated over, before the start of World War II. Another change made before the war was to increase the 3-inch guns to eight, all mounted in the ship's waist. After 1940, the lower aft 6-inch guns were removed and the casemates plated over for the same reason as the lower torpedo mounts. The ship's anti-aircraft armament were augmented by three twin 40 mm (1.6 in) Bofors guns along with 12 20 mm (0.79 in) Oerlikon cannons by the end of the war.

== Inter-war period ==
On completion of a three-month shakedown cruise to Europe, Africa, and South America, Richmond underwent post-shakedown availability and in December departed Norfolk for New Orleans. There, at the end of 1923, she became flagship of the Scouting Force.

In early January 1924, she got underway to participate in Fleet Problem III which tested Caribbean defenses and transit facilities of the Panama Canal. On the 19th, she arrived off Veracruz, rescued survivors of Tacoma, wrecked on Blanquilla Reef; then proceeded to Tampico to stand by as political tension rose. On the 26th, she headed for Galveston, only to return to Mexico on 3 February to evacuate refugees from Puerto Mexico and transport them to Veracruz. On the 17th, she headed east and joined in exercises off Puerto Rico.

In May, Richmond returned briefly to New Orleans, then steamed for the northeast coast and further exercises. Toward the end of July she departed Newport, R.I., for duty as a station ship along the route of USAAS's first aerial circumnavigation of the world. On 2 August, she attempted to take in tow the Douglas World Cruiser "Boston", downed on the Atlantic Ocean after engine trouble, but the floatplane capsized in rough seas, although the two crew were rescued. Then, from September through December, she underwent overhaul at the New York Navy Yard.

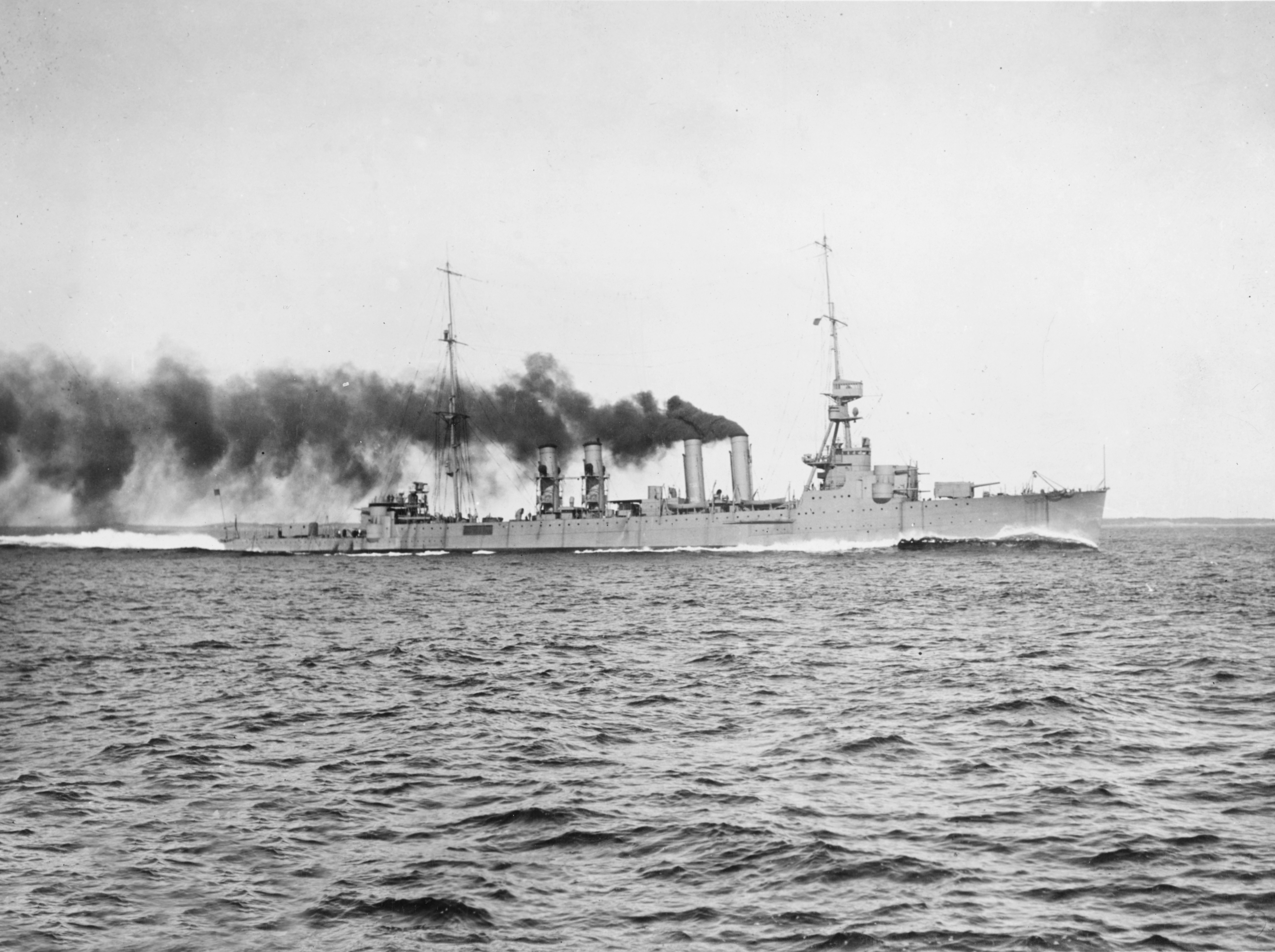
Richmond in 1923 during high speed trials

In January 1925, Richmond, flagship of Light Cruiser Divisions, Scouting Fleet, again participated in Caribbean exercises. In February, she transited the Panama Canal and during March trained off the California coast. In April, she steamed to Hawaii for joint Army-Navy maneuvers, after which she joined the Battle Fleet for a good will cruise to Australia and New Zealand.

Returning to Norfolk on 23 November, Richmond operated off the eastern seaboard and in the Caribbean through 1926. On 1 February 1927, she again transited the Panama Canal; conducted exercises in Hawaiian waters; then continued on to China, arriving at Shanghai on 3 April. She remained on the China Station for a year, with only infrequent diversions to the Philippines for repairs and exercises. On 14 April 1928, she sailed eastward and less than three months later departed San Pedro, California, for Corinto, Nicaragua with a Navy Battalion embarked. On 25 July, she retransited the Panama Canal and for the next six years operated off the New England and mid-Atlantic coasts and in the Caribbean with occasional interruptions for fleet problems and exercises in the eastern Pacific.

From September 1934 to December 1937, Richmond operated off the west coast as a unit of the Scouting Fleet. On 12 February 1935, she rescued 64 members of the crew of the downed airship USS Macon. After 21 December 1937, she served as flagship of the Submarine Force, and on 10 May 1938, she headed back to the east coast. On 26 August, she returned to San Diego and resumed her previous duty with the Submarine Force. In the winter of 1939 and the fall of 1940, she returned to the Atlantic for fleet and submarine exercises, and, at the end of December 1940, hauled down the flag of the Submarine Force.

With the new year, 1941, Richmond shifted to Pearl Harbor; and, from January to June, served as flagship, Scouting Force. Into October, she remained in Hawaiian waters, operating with Cruiser Division 3 (CruDiv 3), then she returned to California and in November began Neutrality Patrols off the west coasts of the Americas. On 7 December, she was en route to Valparaíso, Chile.

== World War II ==
Recalled from her original mission, she took up patrol off Panama and in 1942 commenced escorting reinforcement convoys to the Galápagos Islands and Society Islands. Later, returning to patrols from Panama to Chile, she put into San Francisco for overhaul in December and in January 1943 sailed for the Aleutians.

Richmond arrived at Unalaska on 28 January 1943. On 3 February, she became flagship of Task Group 16.6 (TG 16.6), a cruiser-destroyer task group assigned to defend the approaches to recently occupied Amchitka. On the 10th, she underwent her first enemy air raid and on the 18th she participated in the initial bombardment of Holtz Bay and Chichagof Harbor, Attu Island.

The force then resumed patrols to enforce the blockade of enemy installations on Attu and Kiska. In March, the Japanese decided to run the blockade and on the 22nd dispatched a force of two heavy cruisers, two light cruisers, four destroyers, and three transports from Paramushiro. TG 16.6, one light cruiser, one heavy cruiser, and four destroyers, intercepted the Japanese on the 26th approximately 180 mi (290 km) west of Attu and 100 mi (160 km) south of the Komandorski Islands.

The Japanese sent the transports and one destroyer on, then turned to meet Richmond's force. At 0840, the Battle of the Komandorski Islands began.

Initially firing on Richmond, the Japanese soon concentrated on Salt Lake City, the only American ship with the firing range to reach them. In the running, retiring action which ensued and lasted until shortly after noon, Salt Lake City went dead in the water, but continued firing. Richmond went to her aid as the American destroyers closed the Japanese for a torpedo attack. The enemy, however, low on fuel and ammunition did not press their advantage. Changing course, they headed west, pursued by the American destroyers. Salt Lake City regained power after four minutes and Richmond joined the destroyers, but the action was broken off as the Japanese outdistanced TG 16.6.

The transports sent ahead by the Japanese turned back for the Kuriles before reaching Attu. TG 16.6 had succeeded in its mission. In May, a week-long struggle resulted in the reoccupation of Attu by American forces.

In August, Kiska became the target, and Richmond joined in the preinvasion bombardment. The landings took place on the 15th and met no resistance. The Japanese had pulled out undetected, before the end of July.

On 24 August, Richmond departed the Aleutians; underwent overhaul at Mare Island; then returned to Kiska. Through the remainder of the year, she conducted patrols to the west of the outer Aleutians. On 4 February 1944, she began bombardment missions in the Kuriles which continued, alternated with antishipping sweeps, for the remainder of World War II.

With the end of hostilities, Richmond covered the occupation of northern Japan. On 14 September 1945, she departed Ominato for Pearl Harbor, where she was routed on to Philadelphia for inactivation. Decommissioned on 21 December, Richmond was struck from the Naval Vessel Register on 21 January 1946, and was sold on 18 December to the Patapsco Scrap Co., Bethlehem, Pa.

== Awards ==
- Asiatic-Pacific Campaign Medal with two battle stars for World War II service
