= USS Cincinnati (CL-6) =

Omaha-class light cruiser

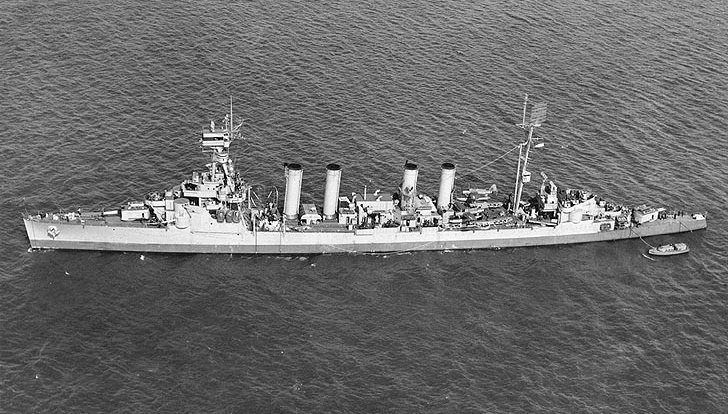
- USS Cincinnati (March 1944)

History

United States
- Name: Cincinnati
- Namesake: City of Cincinnati, Ohio
- Ordered: 29 August 1916
- Awarded: 27 August 1917; 21 February 1919 (supplementary contract)
- Builder: Todd Dry Dock and Construction Company, Tacoma, Washington
- Cost: $1,238,833 (cost of hull & machinery)
- Laid down: 15 May 1920
- Launched: 23 May 1921
- Sponsored by: Mrs. C. E. Tudor
- Completed: 1 July 1922
- Commissioned: 1 January 1924
- Decommissioned: 1 November 1945
- Identification: Hull symbol: CL-6; Code letters: NISN
- Honors and awards: 1 × battle star
- Fate: Scrapped, February 1946

General characteristics (as built)
- Class & type: Omaha-class light cruiser
- Displacement: 7,500 long tons (7,620 t) (standard); 9,507 long tons (9,660 t) (full load)
- Length: 555 ft 6 in (169.32 m) oa; 550 ft (170 m) pp
- Beam: 55 ft (17 m)
- Draft: 14 ft 3 in (4.34 m) (mean); 20 ft (6.1 m) (max)
- Installed power: 12 × Yarrow boiler; 90,000 shp (67,000 kW) (designed horse power)
- Propulsion: 4 × Parsons steam turbines; 4 × screws
- Speed: 35 kn (65 km/h; 40 mph) (designed speed)
- Crew: 29 officers 429 enlisted (peacetime)
- Armament: 2 × twin 6 in (152 mm)/53 caliber guns; 8 × single 6 in/53 caliber guns; 2 × 3 in (76 mm)/50 caliber anti-aircraft guns; 2 × triple 21 in (533 mm) torpedo tubes; 2 × twin 21 in torpedo tubes; 224 × mines
- Armor: Belt: 3 in (76 mm); Deck: 1 1/2 in (38 mm); Conning Tower: 1 1/2 in; Bulkheads: 1 1/2-3 in
- Aircraft carried: 2 × floatplanes
- Aviation facilities: 2 × Amidship catapults; crane

General characteristics (1945)
- Armament: 2 × twin 6 in/53 caliber; 6 × single 6 in/53 caliber; 8 × 3 in/50 caliber anti-aircraft guns; 2 × triple 21 in torpedo tubes; 3 × twin 40 mm (1.6 in) Bofors guns; 2 × Army 40mm Bofors guns; 14 × single 20 mm (0.79 in) Oerlikon cannons

USS Cincinnati (CL-6), was the third Omaha-class light cruiser, originally classified as a scout cruiser, built for the United States Navy. She was the third Navy ship named after the city of Cincinnati, Ohio, the first being Cincinnati, an ironclad commissioned in 1862, during the Civil War, and the second being Cincinnati, a protected cruiser, that was decommissioned in 1919.

Cincinnati split her pre-war career between the Atlantic and the Pacific fleets. She served in the Scouting Fleet, based in the Atlantic, in 1924 to 1927, During which she obtained 2 Animals the crew would soon name Whiffles and Soup and would quickly become the vessels mascots, both would be seen sitting in her fore 6-inch (150 mm)/53 caliber turret. She would serve in the Pacific for a brief time in 1925 for fleet maneuvers. Cincinnati joined the Asiatic Fleet in 1927, and returned to the Atlantic from 1928 to 1932. She continued to go back and forth between oceans until March 1941, when she was assigned to Neutrality Patrol in the western Atlantic.

When the United States entered World War II she was assigned to TF41, based at Recife, and used on convoy escort duties and patrols in the south Atlantic. In 1944, she sailed for the Mediterranean to support Operation Dragoon, the invasion of the south of France. After the war, she was deemed surplus and scrapped at the Philadelphia Naval Shipyard in February 1946.

== Construction and design ==
Cincinnati was ordered on 29 August 1916, and contracted to be built by Todd Dry Dock and Construction Company, Tacoma, Washington, on 27 August 1917. Her keel was laid on 15 May 1920, and she was launched on 23 May 1921. She was sponsored by Mrs. Charles E. Tudor, wife of the Director of Safety of Cincinnati, having been designated by the Honorable John Galvin, Mayor of Cincinnati. Cincinnati was commissioned on 1 January 1924, Captain Charles P. Nelson in command.

Cincinnati was 550 feet (170 m) long at the waterline with an overall length of 555 feet 6 inches (169.32 m), her beam was 55 ft 4 in (16.87 m) and had a mean draft of 13 ft 6 in (4.11 m). Her standard displacement was 7,050 long tons (7,163 t) and 9,507 long tons (9,660 t) at full load. Her crew, during peacetime, consisted of 29 officers and 429 enlisted men.

Cincinnati was powered by four Westinghouse geared steam turbines, each driving one screw, using steam generated by 12 Yarrow boilers. The engines were designed to produce 90,000 shaft horsepower (67,000 kW) and reach a top speed of 35 knots (65 km/h; 40 mph). She was designed to provide a range of 10,000 nautical miles (19,000 km; 12,000 mi) at a speed of 10 kn (19 km/h; 12 mph), but was only capable of 8,460 nmi (15,670 km; 9,740 mi) at a speed of 10 knots.

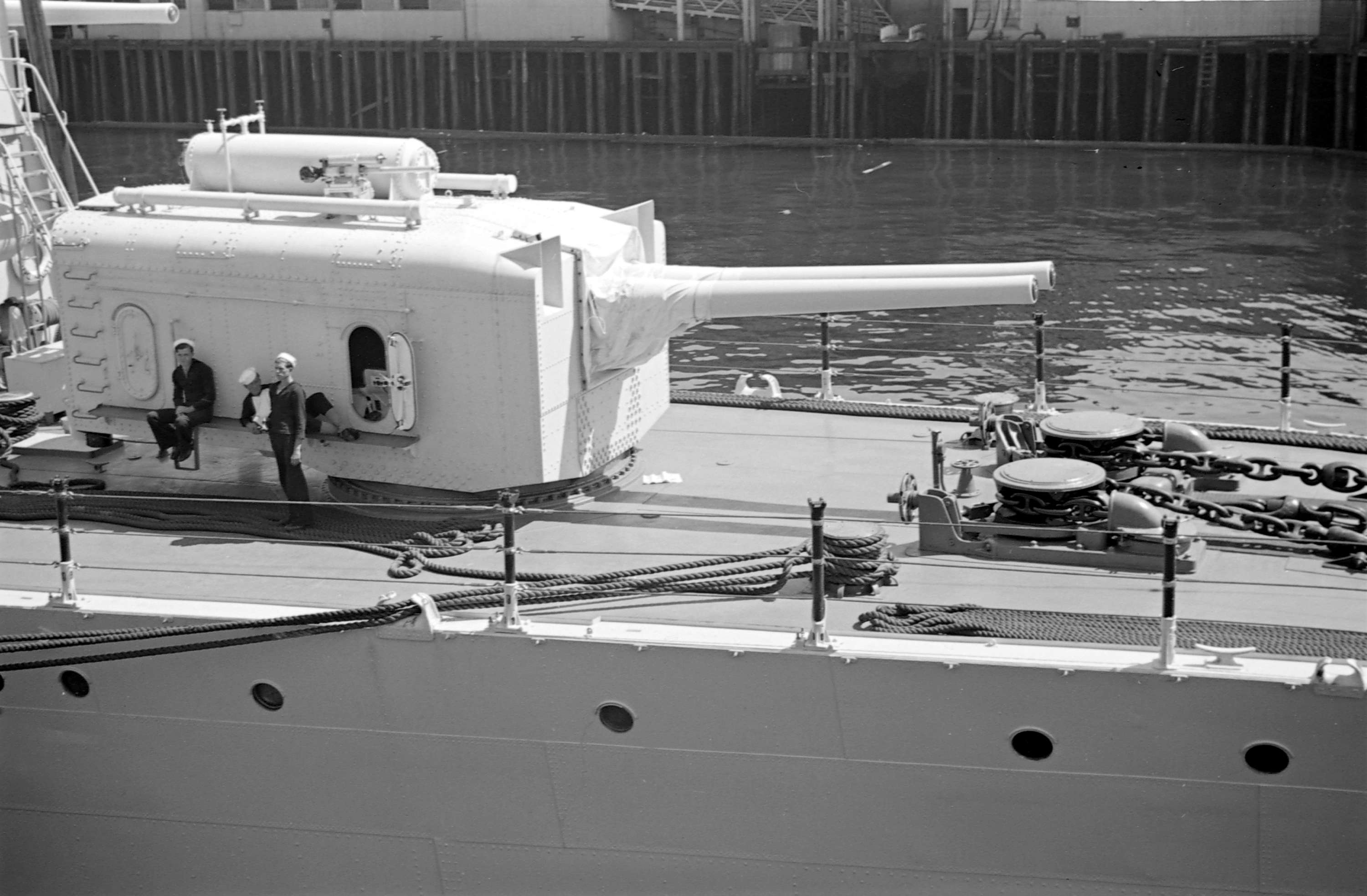
Twin 6-inch gun turret on USS Cincinnati at Vancouver 1937

Cincinnati's main armament went through many changes while she was being designed. Originally she was to mount ten 6-inch (150 mm)/53 caliber guns; two on either side at the waist, with the remaining eight mounted in tiered casemates on either side of the fore and aft superstructures. After the United States entry into World War I the US Navy worked alongside the Royal Navy and it was decided to mount four 6-inch/53 caliber guns in two twin gun turrets fore and aft and keep the eight guns in the tiered casemates so that she would have an eight gun broadside and, due to limited arcs of fire from the casemate guns, four to six guns firing fore or aft. Her secondary armament consisted of two 3-inch (76 mm)/50 caliber anti-aircraft (AA) guns in single mounts. She also carried two triple and two twin, above-water torpedo tube mounts for 21-inch (533 mm) torpedoes. The triple mounts were fitted on either side of the upper deck, aft of the aircraft catapults, and the twin mounts were one deck lower on either side, covered by hatches in the side of the hull. Cincinnati was also built with the capacity to carry 224 mines.

The ship lacked a full-length waterline armor belt. The sides of her boiler and engine rooms and steering gear were protected by three inches of armor. The transverse bulkheads at the end of her machinery rooms were one and a half inches (38 mm) thick forward and three inches thick aft. The conning tower and the deck over the machinery spaces and steering gear had one and a half inches of armor. The gun turrets were not armored and only provided protection against muzzle blast and splinter damage.

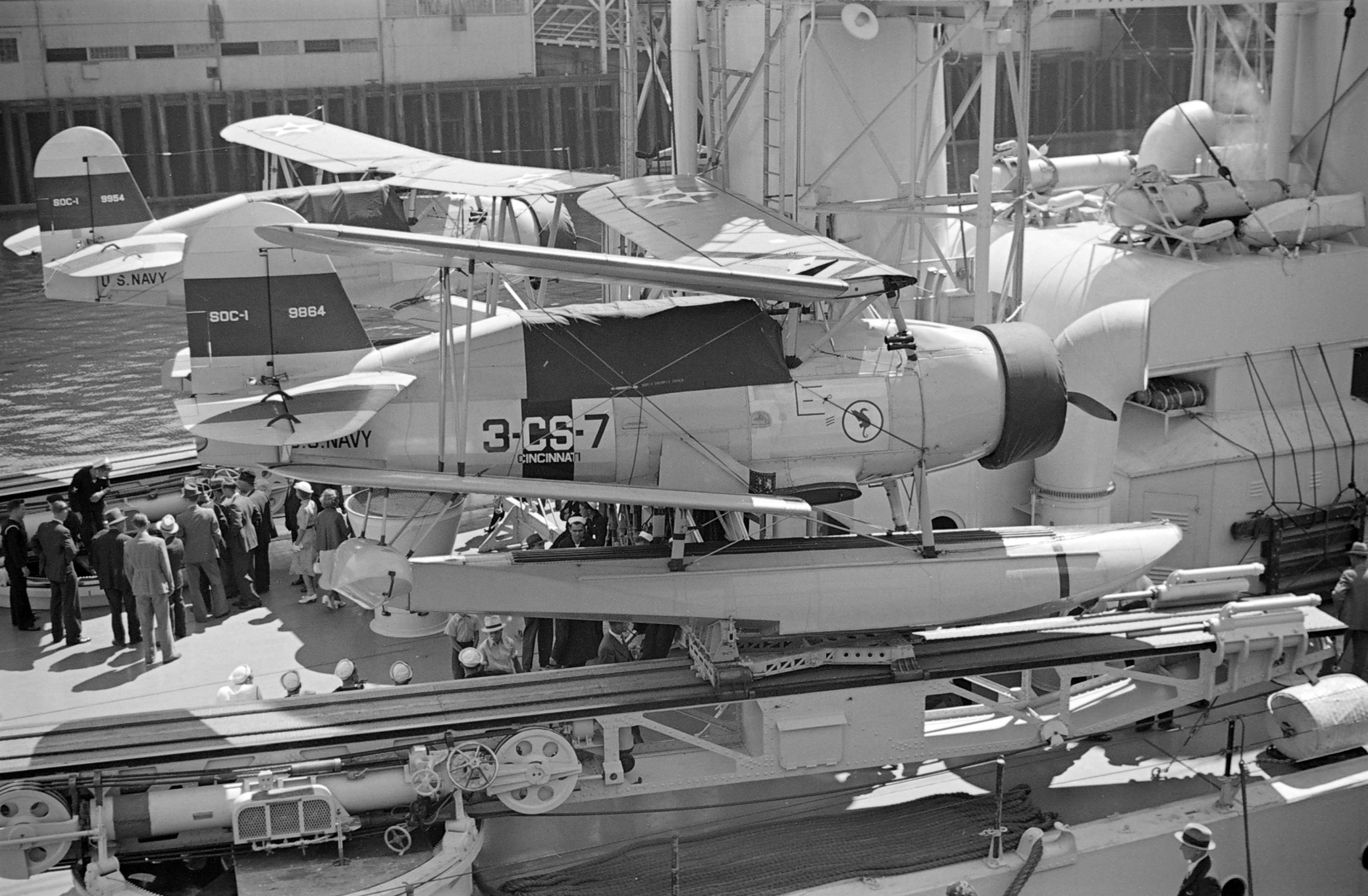
SOC Seagull floatplanes on USS Cincinnati at Vancouver 1937.

Cincinnati carried two floatplanes aboard that were stored on the two catapults. Initially these were Vought VE-9s, then Vought UO-1s, the ship then operated Curtiss SOC Seagulls from 1935, and Vought OS2U Kingfishers after 1940.

=== Armament changes ===
During her career Cincinnati went through several armament changes. Some of these changes were to reduce weight, but others were to increase her AA armament. On 8 September 1926, the Chief of Naval Operations, Admiral Edward W. Eberle, along with the Commanders in Chief of the United States Fleet and Battle Fleet, and their subordinate commanding officers, the Secretary of the Navy, Curtis D. Wilbur, ordered that all mines and the tracks for laying the mines be removed from all of the Omaha-class cruisers, the working conditions had been found to be very "wet". Another change made before the war was to increase the 3-inch guns to eight, all mounted in the ship's waist. After 1940, the lower aft 6-inch guns were removed and the casemates plated over for the same reason as the lower torpedo mounts. The ship's AA armament were originally augmented by three quadruple 1.1-inch (28 mm)/75 gun mounts by early 1942, however, these didn't prove to be reliable and were replaced by twin 40-millimeter (1.57 in) Bofors guns along with 14 20-millimeter (0.79 in) Oerlikon cannons by the end of the war. It was reported that Cincinnati also mounted a pair of Army 40mm Bofors guns.

== Service history ==
=== Inter-war period ===
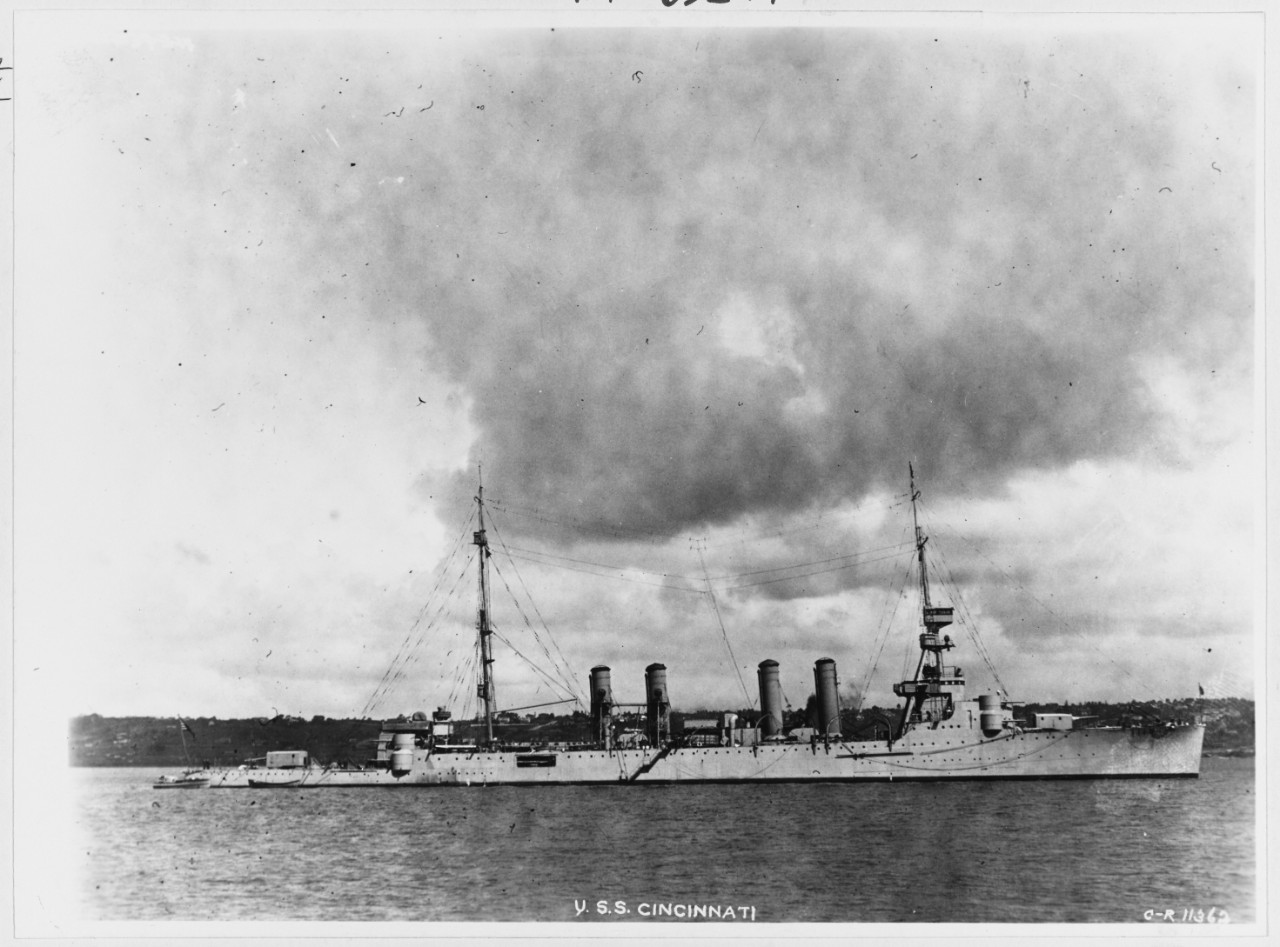
USS Cincinnati (CL-6) in harbor, c. the mid-1920s, with the lower torpedo tubes openings still visible.

Cincinnati began her career with the Scouting Fleet in operations along the eastern seaboard and the Caribbean, until February 1927, when transferred to duty in the Far East, based at Shanghai. This duty only lasted until April 1928, when she sailed for Newport, Rhode Island, and conducted operations along the east coast again, until 1932. Cincinnati left for the Pacific joining the Battle Force, with occasional trips to the east coast, until 1939, when she was again reassigned to Atlantic duty.

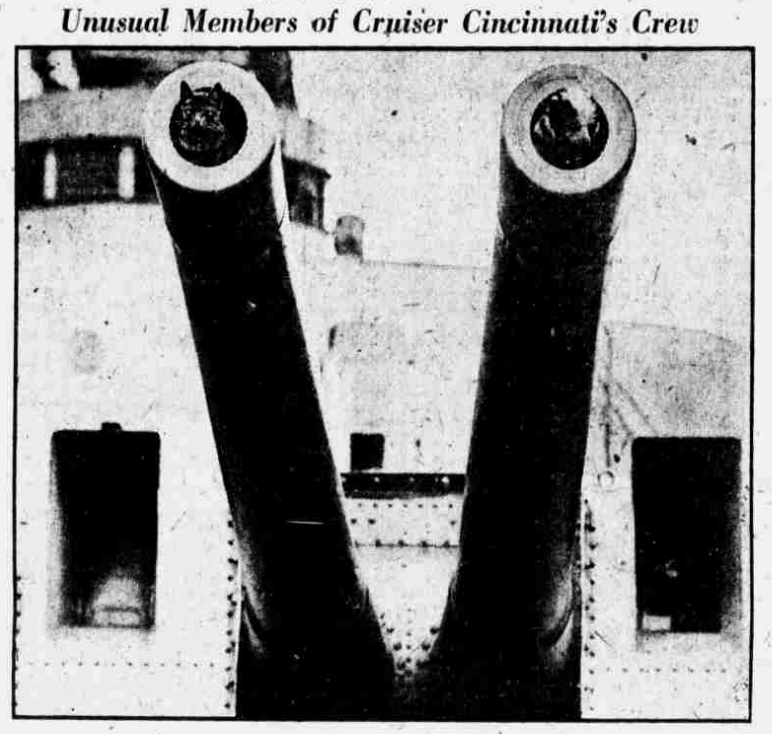
Whiffles and Soup Aboard USS Cincinnati (CL-6)

On 12 February 1935, she rescued six members of the crew of the downed airship USS Macon.

=== World War II ===
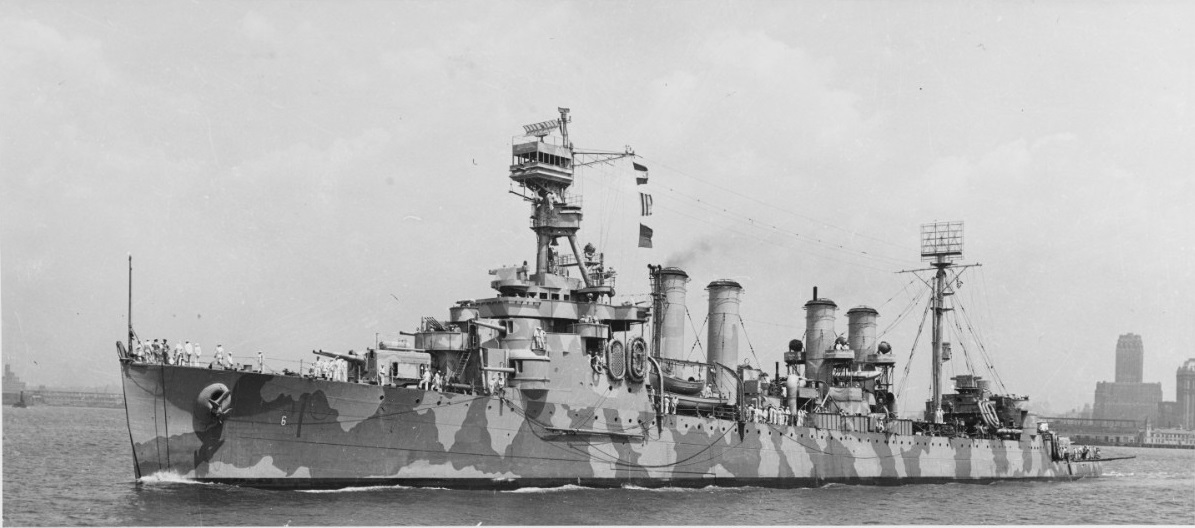
USS Cincinnati (CL-6) off New York City 8 July 1942.

Cincinnati transferred to Pearl Harbor in April 1940, sailing for Guam and the Philippines and conducting transport duty at the end of the year. After a year in the Pacific Cincinnati returned to the Atlantic to join her sister ships in the expanding neutrality patrols in the western Atlantic. After the United States entered the war, she continued patrolling, along with convoy escort duties, blockading the French fleet at Martinique, and searching for German blockade runners. On 21 November 1942, along with her sister Milwaukee and the destroyer Somers, they spotted Anneliese Essberger. The crew had begun to scuttle the ship, but the boarding party that had been dispatched was able to reach the ship and discover her true identity, a German blockade runner. They took the crew of 62 as prisoners, before she sank. Cincinnati received an overhaul at New York, in early 1944, before serving as the escort flagship for three convoys crossing from New York to Belfast, Northern Ireland, from March 1944 to July 1944. She sailed for the western Mediterranean on 28 July, to assist with the assault on southern France, before again returning to New York for overhaul. She then joined the 4th Fleet at Recife, Brazil, on 17 November, and finished out the war in the European Theater patrolling the south Atlantic shipping lanes.

Cincinnati carried out two midshipmen training cruises during the summer of 1945. On 29 September, she arrived at Philadelphia, where a Board of Inspection and Survey recommended that she be taken out of commission. She was decommissioned 1 November 1945, and scrapped on 27 February 1946.

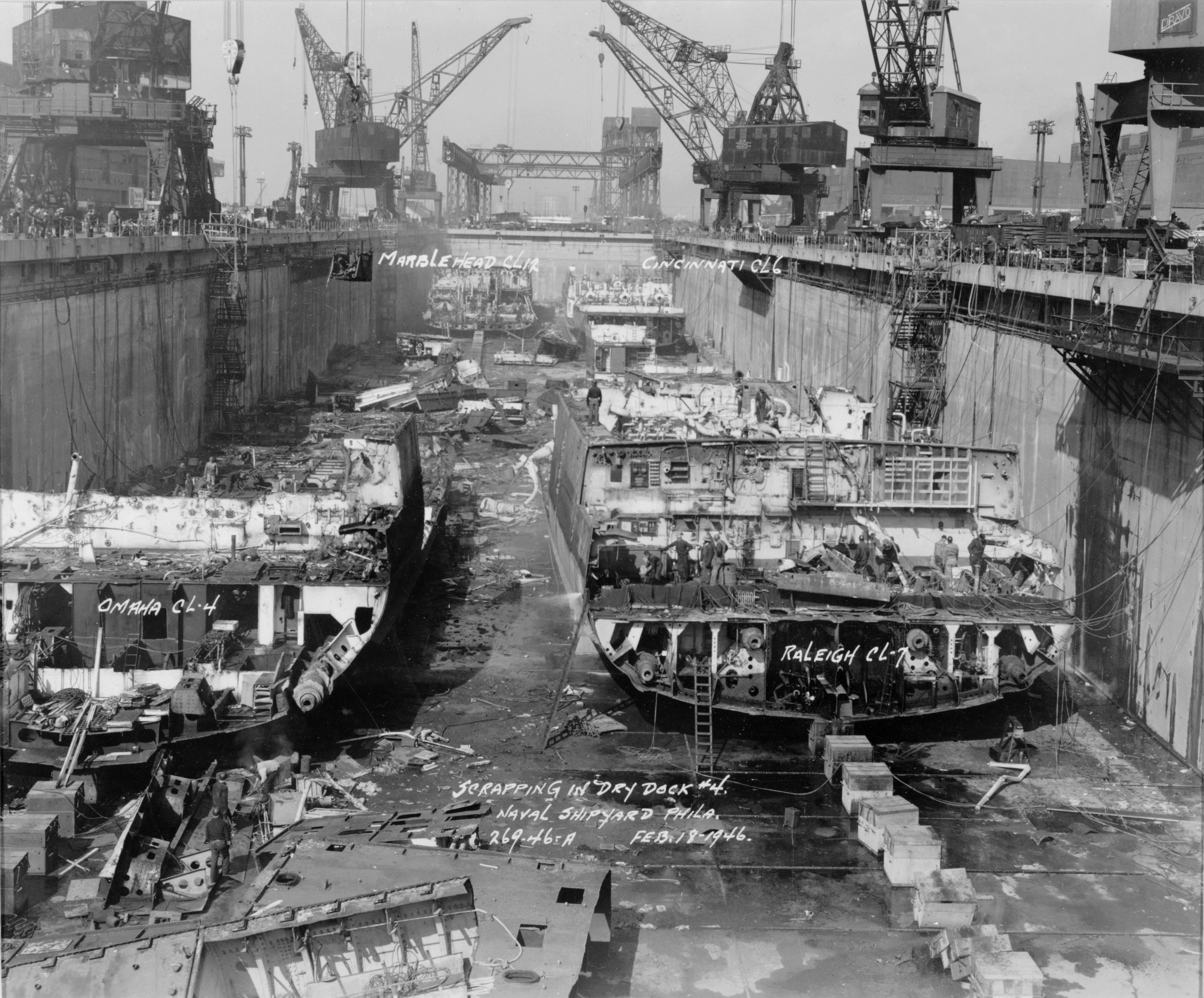
Philadelphia Naval Shipyard, 18 February 1946, scrapping in Dry Dock #4 of Marblehead, Cincinnati, Omaha, and Raleigh.

The ship's bell is in the lobby of the main branch of the Cincinnati Public Library.

== Notable commanders ==
| Name | Date | Final rank attained |
|---|---|---|
| Captain Charles P. Nelson | 1 January 1924 – 20 September 1924 | Rear Admiral |
| Captain Gilbert Jonathan Rowcliff | 31 July 1928 – 2 August 1930 | Rear Admiral |

== Awards ==
- Second Nicaraguan Campaign Medal
- Yangtze Service Medal
- American Defense Service Medal
- American Campaign Medal
- European–African–Middle Eastern Campaign Medal with one battle star
- World War II Victory Medal

== Bibliography ==
- "Cincinnati III (CL-6)". Dictionary of American Naval Fighting Ships. Naval History and Heritage Command. 30 June 2015. This article incorporates text from this source, which is in the public domain.
- Friedman, Norman (1984). U.S. Cruisers: An Illustrated Design History. Naval Institute Press. ISBN 9780870217180.
- "Todd Pacific Shipyards, Inc., Tacoma WA". ShipbuildingHistory.com. 4 August 2012.
- Toppan, Andrew (22 January 2000). "US Cruisers List: Light/Heavy/Antiaircraft Cruisers, Part 1". Hazegray.org. Archived from the original on 12 December 2012.
- "Ships' Data, U. S. Naval Vessels". US Naval Department. 1 July 1921. pp. 54–59.
- Ships' Data, U. S. Naval Vessels. US Naval Department. 1 July 1935. pp. 24–31.
- "Table 21 - Ships on Navy List June 30, 1919". Congressional Serial Set. U.S. Government Printing Office: 771. 1921.
- Terzibashitsch, Stefan (1988). Cruisers of the US Navy 1922-1962. Naval Institute Press. ISBN 0-87021-974-X.
- ""Lone Survivor" US Navy SEAL Hero Marcus Luttrell Speaks at the Main Library on May 12" (PDF). The Public Library of Cincinnati and Hamilton County. 24 April 2009. Archived from the original (PDF) on 1 June 2011.
- "USS CINCINNATI (CL 6)". NavSource. 6 November 2017.
