= Omaha-class cruiser =

US Navy light cruiser class

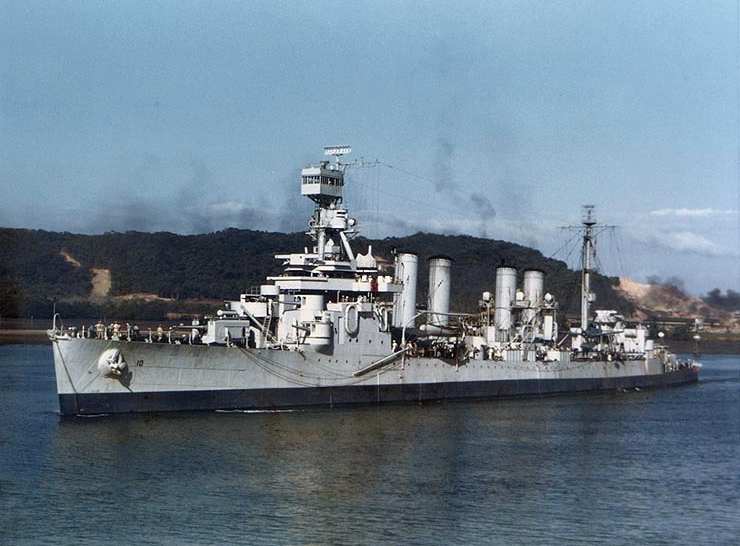
- USS Concord in 1943

Class overview
- Name: Omaha class
- Operators: United States Navy; Soviet Navy
- Preceded by: Chester class
- Succeeded by: Brooklyn class
- Built: 1918–1925
- In commission: 1923–1949
- Planned: 10
- Completed: 10
- Scrapped: 10

General characteristics
- Type: Light cruiser
- Displacement: 7,050 long tons (7,163 t) standard, 9,508 long tons (9,661 t) full
- Length: 550 ft (170 m) wl; 555 ft 6 in (169.32 m) oa
- Beam: 55 ft 4 in (16.87 m)
- Draft: 20 ft 0 in (6.10 m)
- Installed power: 12 × 265 psi (1,830 kPa) Yarrow boilers; 90,000 shp (67,000 kW)
- Propulsion: 4 × Westinghouse reduction geared steam turbines; 4 × screws
- Speed: 35 kn (65 km/h; 40 mph)
- Endurance: 9,000 nmi (17,000 km; 10,000 mi) at 10 kn (19 km/h; 12 mph)
- Boats & landing craft carried: 2 × lifeboats
- Complement: 29 officers 429 enlisted (peace time)
- Sensors & processing systems: 1x Mark 6 GFCS (CL-4 to 9); 1x Mark 8 GFCS (CL-4 to 9); 2x Mark 16 GFCS (CL-10 to 13); CXAM-1 air-search radar; SK-1 air-search radar
- Armament: 2 × dual 6"/53 cal guns; 8 × single 6"/53 cal guns; 2 × single 3"/50 cal guns; 2 × triple 21" torpedo tubes; 2 × dual 21" torpedo tubes; 224 × mines
- Armor: Belt: 3 in (76 mm); Deck: 1 1/2 in (38 mm); Conning Tower: 1 1/2 in; Bulkheads: 1 1/2-3 in
- Aircraft carried: 2 × floatplanes
- Aviation facilities: 2 × aircraft catapults

The Omaha-class cruisers were a class of light cruisers built for the United States Navy. They were the oldest class of cruiser still in active service with the Navy at the outbreak of World War II, being an immediate post-World War I design.

== History ==
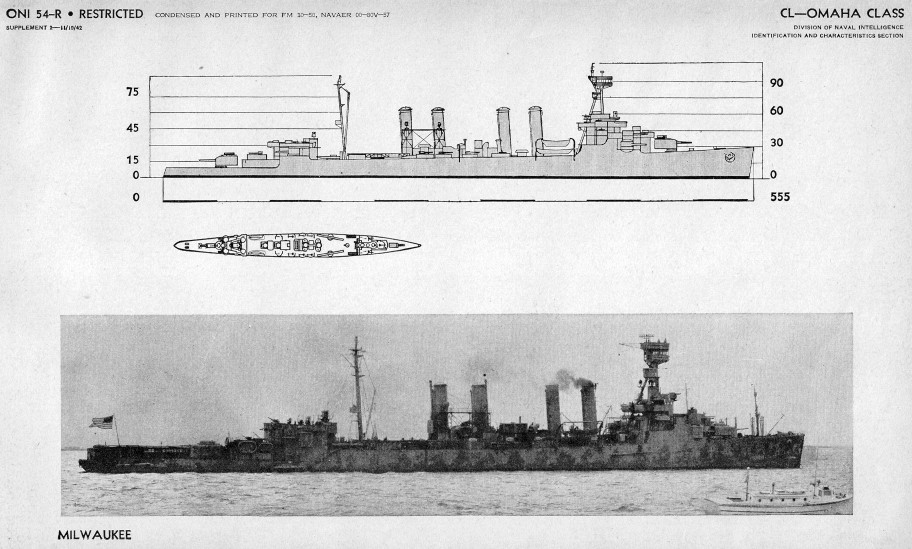
1942 ship recognition chart for the Omaha class

Maneuvers conducted in January 1915 made it clear that the US Atlantic Fleet lacked the fast cruisers necessary to provide information on the enemy's position, deny the enemy information of the fleet's own position, and screen friendly forces. Built to scout for a fleet of battleships, the Omaha class featured high speed (35 kn (65 km/h; 40 mph)) for cooperation with destroyers, and 6-inch (152 mm) guns to fend off any destroyers the enemy might send against them. Displacing 7,050 long tons (7,160 t), they were just over 555 ft (169 m) long.

The Omaha class was designed specifically in response to the British Centaur subclass of the C-class cruiser. Although from a modern viewpoint, a conflict between the US and Great Britain seems implausible, US Navy planners during this time, and up to the mid-1930s, considered Britain to be a formidable rival for power in the Atlantic, and the possibility of armed conflict between the two countries plausible enough to merit appropriate planning measures.

The Omaha class mounted four smokestacks, a look remarkably similar to the Clemson-class destroyers (a camouflage scheme was devised to enhance the resemblance). Their armament showed the slow change from casemate-mounted weapons to turret-mounted guns. They carried twelve 6 in (150 mm)/53 caliber guns, of which four were mounted in two twin turrets, one fore and one aft, and the remaining eight in casemates; four on each side, at the corners of the superstructure. This gave them a broadside of eight guns. Launched in 1920, Omaha (designated C-4 and later CL-4) had a displacement of 7,050 long tons. The cruisers emerged with a distinctly old-fashioned appearance owing to their World War I-type stacked twin casemate-mount cannons and were among the last broadside cruisers designed anywhere.

Additional torpedo tubes and hydrophone installation was ordered. As a result of the design changes placed on the ship mid-construction, the vessel that entered the water in 1920 was a badly overloaded design that, even at the beginning, had been rather tight. The ships were insufficiently insulated, too hot in the tropics and too cold in the north. Sacrifices in weight savings in the name of increased speed led to severe compromise in the habitability of the ship. While described as a good ship in a seaway, the low freeboard led to frequent water ingestion over the bow and in the torpedo compartments and lower aft casemates. The lightly built hulls leaked, so that sustained high-speed steaming contaminated the oil tanks with sea water.

A serious flaw in these ships' subdivision was the complete lack of watertight bulkheads anywhere above the main deck or aft on the main deck.

These drawbacks notwithstanding, the US Navy took some pride in the Omaha class. They featured improved compartmentalization; propulsion machinery was laid out on the unit system, with alternating groups of boiler rooms and engine rooms, to prevent immobilization by a single torpedo hit. This class was the first with magazines on the centerline, below the waterline. These were also the first U.S. Navy cruisers designed after the switch from coal to oil-fired boilers.

Originally designed to serve as scouts, they served throughout the interwar period as leaders of fleet flotillas, helping them resist enemy destroyer attack. Tactical scouting became the province of cruiser aircraft, and the distant scouting role was taken over by the new heavy cruisers spawned by the Washington Naval Treaty. Thus, the Omaha class never performed their designed function. They were relegated to the fleet-screening role, where their high speed and great volume of fire were most appreciated.

=== Armament changes ===
During their careers the Omahas went through several armament changes. Some of these changes were to save weight, while others were to increase their AA armament. On 8 September 1926, the Chief of Naval Operations, Admiral Edward W. Eberle, along with the Commanders in Chief of the United States Fleet and Battle Fleet, and their subordinate commanding officers, the Secretary of the Navy, Curtis D. Wilbur, ordered that all mines and the tracks for laying the mines be removed from all of the Omaha-class cruisers, as the working conditions had been found to be very "wet". In 1933–1934, their 3-inch AA guns were increased from two to eight, all mounted in the ship's waist. The lower torpedo tube mounts, which had also proved to be very wet, were removed and the openings plated over before the start of World War II. After 1939, the lower aft 6-inch guns were removed from most of the Omahas and the casemates plated over for the same reason as the lower torpedo mounts. The ships' AA armament was first augmented by three quadruple 1.1-inch (28 mm)/75 gun mounts by early 1942, however, these did not prove reliable and were replaced by twin 40-millimeter (1.57 in) Bofors guns later in the war. At about the same time they also received 20-millimeter (0.79 in) Oerlikon cannons.

== World War II service ==
Both Detroit and Raleigh were at Pearl Harbor during the Japanese surprise attack, with Raleigh being torpedoed. Detroit, along with St. Louis and Phoenix, were the only large ships to get out of the harbor during the attack.

Most ships of the Omaha class spent the war deployed to secondary theaters and in less vital tasks than those assigned to more recently built cruisers. The Omaha class were sent to places where their significant armament and speed might be useful if called upon, but where their age and limited abilities were less likely to be tested. These secondary destinations included patrols off the east and west coasts of South America, convoy escort in the South Pacific far from the front lines of battle, patrols and shore bombardment along the distant and frigid Aleutians and Kuril Islands chains, and bombardment duty in the invasion of Southern France when naval resistance was expected to be minimal. Marblehead participated in early war actions around the Dutch East Indies (most notably, the Battle of Makassar Strait), and Richmond engaged in the Battle of the Komandorski Islands. Detroit saw the most significant action of the ships of this class during the war while in the Pacific theater: at Iwo Jima and Okinawa, she served as the flagship of the Logistics Support Group (TF 50.8) of the Fifth Fleet.

None of the ships were wartime losses. Raleigh's torpedo damage at Pearl Harbor and Marblehead's damage at Makassar Strait were the only significant wartime combat damage suffered by the class.

The ships of the class were considered obsolete as the war ended, and were decommissioned and scrapped within seven months of the surrender of Japan (with the exception of Milwaukee, which had been loaned to the Soviet Navy, and was scrapped when returned to US Navy control in 1949).

== Ships in class ==
Construction data
Ship name	Hull no.	Builder	Laid down	Launched	Comm.	Decomm.	Fate
Omaha	CL-4	Todd Dry Dock and Construction Company, Tacoma, Washington	6 Dec 1918	14 Dec 1920	24 Feb 1923	1 Nov 1945	Struck 28 Nov 1945; Scrapped Feb 1946
Milwaukee	CL-5	Todd Dry Dock and Construction Company, Tacoma, Washington	13 Dec 1918	24 Mar 1922	20 Jun 1923	16 Mar 1949	Struck 18 Mar 1949; Sold for scrap, 10 Dec 1949
Cincinnati	CL-6	Todd Dry Dock and Construction Company, Tacoma, Washington	15 May 1920	23 May 1921	1 Jan 1924	1 Nov 1945	Scrapped Feb 1946
Raleigh	CL-7	Bethlehem Shipbuilding Corporation, Fore River Shipyard, Quincy, Massachusetts	16 Aug 1920	25 Oct 1922	6 Feb 1924	2 Nov 1945	Struck 28 Nov 1945; Scrapped, Feb 1946
Detroit	CL-8	Bethlehem Shipbuilding Corporation, Fore River Shipyard, Quincy, Massachusetts	10 Nov 1920	29 Jun 1922	31 Jul 1923	11 Jan 1946	Struck 21 Jan 1946; Scrapped, Feb 1946
Richmond	CL-9	William Cramp & Sons, Philadelphia	16 Feb 1920	29 Sep 1921	2 Jul 1923	21 Dec 1945	Struck 21 Jan 1946; Sold for scrap, 18 Dec 1946
Concord	CL-10	William Cramp & Sons, Philadelphia	29 Mar 1920	15 Dec 1921	3 Nov 1923	12 Dec 1945	Struck 8 Jan 1946; Sold for scrap, 21 Jan 1947
Trenton	CL-11	William Cramp & Sons, Philadelphia	18 Aug 1920	16 Apr 1923	19 Apr 1924	20 Dec 1945	Struck 21 Jan 1946; Sold for scrap, 29 Dec 1946
Marblehead	CL-12	William Cramp & Sons, Philadelphia	4 Aug 1920	9 Oct 1923	8 Sep 1924	1 Nov 1945	Struck 28 Nov 1945; Sold for scrap 27 Feb 1946
Memphis	CL-13	William Cramp & Sons, Philadelphia	14 Oct 1920	17 Apr 1924	4 Feb 1925	17 Dec 1945	Struck 8 Jan 1946; Sold for scrap, 18 Dec 1947

== Omaha alternatives ==
Two other Omaha versions were also designed. One design was intended to function as a monitor: it had two 14-inch guns in two single turrets. The other design had four 8-inch guns in two twin turrets. The second design eventually evolved into the Pensacola-class cruiser.

In 1928, after Langley proved successful, a carrier version was proposed. This design omitted the two twin 6 in gun turrets, and only included four of the original single 6 in casemate guns.

== See also ==
- List of cruisers of the United States Navy
