= Henry E. Lackey =

American Navy admiral (1876–1952)

Henry Ellis Lackey
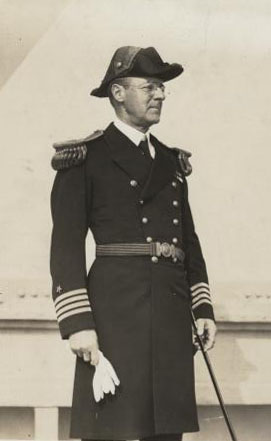
- Henry Ellis Lackey before June 1932
- Born: 23 June 1876; Norfolk, Virginia
- Died: 15 October 1952 (aged 76); Peterborough, New Hampshire
- Burial place: Rock Creek Cemetery, District of Columbia
- Military career
- Allegiance: United States
- Branch: United States Navy
- Rank: Rear Admiral
- Commands: USS San Francisco; USS Memphis; USS California
- Conflicts: Battle of Santiago de Cuba
- Awards: Navy Cross (United States); Commander of the Order of the Savior (Greece); Order of Naval Merit and Efficiency, 3rd Class (Spain)

Henry E. Lackey (1876–1952) was a rear admiral in the United States Navy. Henry Ellis Lackey served in various capacities as an engineer, inspector, navigator and line officer in the late 19th and early 20th centuries.

== Early life ==
Rear Admiral Lackey was born in Norfolk, Virginia, 23 June 1876, the son of Navy engineer Oscar Hamilton Lackey. He was appointed to the Naval Academy by the President of the United States, Grover Cleveland, in 1895. Graduated from the Naval Academy in 1899.

== Naval service ==
=== Spanish–American War ===
After seeing active service as a midshipman in New York, Rear Admiral William Thomas Sampson's flagship, during the Battle of Santiago in the Spanish–American War, he made his mark as an engineering officer, following in his father's footsteps.

=== Early naval service ===
In 1899, he joined Massachusetts and during 1900, served in Eagle and Bancroft. In 1901, he was transferred to Topeka and in 1903, to Wheeling, in American Samoa. He served in Galveston which was placed in commission in February 1905, and in June, sailed for the Asiatic Station via Europe. In 1906, he was in Wilmington, also in the Asiatic Station, and in 1908, was ordered to duty at the Naval Proving Ground, Indian Head, Maryland. At Indian Head, Lackey improved living conditions in the surrounding areas. He constructed hotels, barracks, hotels, homes, a post office and a school which would eventually bare his name. He was senior engineer officer of New York from March to August 1910, when he was appointed Fleet Engineer on the staff of Rear Admiral John Hubbard, commander-in-chief, Asiatic Fleet. As Fleet Engineer he surveyed channels in the Yangtze River between Wuchou and Shanghai to enhance the effectiveness of US naval forces overseeing the enforcement of US treaty rights in China. He was on duty at the Norfolk Navy Yard from 1911 until he was assigned as navigator of Georgia, in January 1915, seeing hostilities at Vera Cruz, Mexico. In 1916, he was assigned executive officer of Kansas until the end of the year.

=== World War I ===
For four years he was Inspector of Ordnance in charge of the Naval Ordnance Proving Grounds and Powder Factory, Indian Head, Maryland, and was awarded the Navy Cross 'for exceptionally meritorious' service during the World War 'in handling and testing the great amount of ordnance material with which that station was called upon to deal, so rapidly as to maintain a constant flow of absolutely necessary material to the service.'

=== Post war service ===
In April 1920, he assumed command of San Francisco, and in October 1920, was given additional duty as Commander Mine Force, Atlantic Fleet. He was Director of Ships Movements, Office of Naval Operations, from 1921 until 1924, and had additional duty as the Navy's representative at the Interstate Petroleum Meeting in 1921 and 1922.

In 1924, he was assigned to duty at the shipyard of William Cramp & Sons Company in Philadelphia, Pennsylvania, as the oversight officer for the building of the light cruiser Memphis which he took command of upon her commissioning in December 1924, and during her service as flagship of United States Naval Forces in Europe. In April 1925, Lackey was the US naval representative at the opening of the Oliver Hazard Perry Memorial Gateway in Port-of-Spain, Trinidad. During the summer months of 1925, Lackey sailed Memphis, as part of the US Pacific Fleet, to Australia and New Zealand to show the flag and reaffirm US goodwill. The next year, he sailed Memphis to the Mediterranean, relieving Pittsburgh as the flagship of Commander, US Naval Forces in Europe. Showing the flag was the principal duty for Memphis as she made port calls along the North African littoral and European shores. In August 1926, during a port call in Santander, Spain, Lackey hosted King Alfonso XIII during his visit to the US squadron. During this tour of the Mediterranean, Lackey was made a Commander of the Order of the Savior by the government of Greece and was further awarded, in December 1926, the Spanish Order of Naval Merit and Efficiency, 3rd Class by King Alfonso XIII. Continuing into Northern European waters, Memphis made port calls in Dublin, Belfast, and Kiel, completing her European tour of duty by embarking Charles A. Lindbergh in Southampton, England, on 3 June 1927, and Lindbergh's aircraft, Spirit of St. Louis, at Cherbourg on 11 June 1927, and sailing for the United States.

Rear Admiral Lackey was in command of the Naval Station Norfolk, Virginia, from 1927 to 1930, when he assumed command of California, flagship of the Battle Force.

=== Late naval service ===
On 16 January 1932, he was given charge of the Branch Hydrographic Office, San Francisco, and in May of that year was transferred to duty as Senior member of the Board of Inspection and Survey, San Francisco.

He was Commander, Cruiser Division Four, Scouting Force, from 1933 until 1935, when he was appointed Director of Shore Establishments. He served in that capacity until late in 1937, and assumed duty on 4 December 1937, as Commander, Squadron 40-T operating in European waters. He returned to the United States in September 1939, and on 30 October 1939, reported for duty as President General Court Martial, Third Naval District.

== Retirement and death ==
Lackey retired from the US Navy on 1 July 1940, due to deteriorating health. He settled in Temple, New Hampshire, and died in Peterborough, New Hampshire, on 15 October 1952. He is buried in Rock Creek Cemetery, District of Columbia.

== Bibliography ==
Online resources

- "Papers of Rear Admiral Henry E. Lackey". Naval History and Heritage Command. 29 May 2014. Archived from the original on 14 February 2015. This article incorporates text from this source, which is in the public domain.
