= Holtz Bay =

Coordinates: 52°56′50″N 173°11′31″E

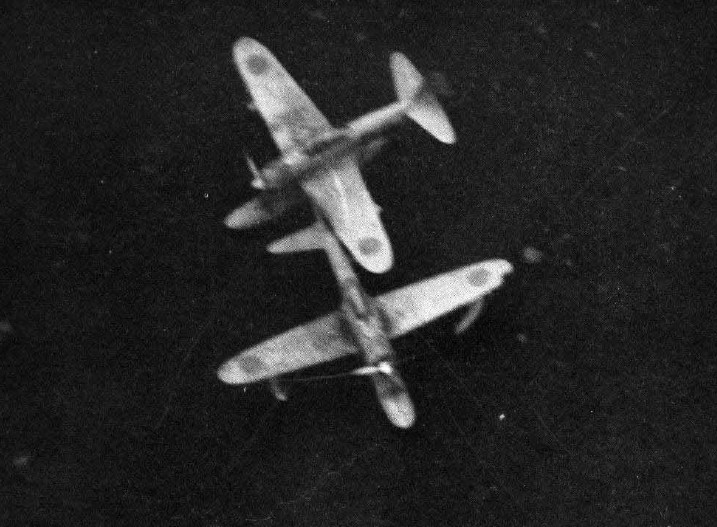
USAAF reconnaissance photograph of two Nakajima A6M2-Ns in Holtz Bay, 1942

Holtz Bay is an inlet on the northeast coast of the island of Attu in the Aleutian Islands in Alaska.

Holtz Bay was among the landing sites of United States Army troops in the Battle of Attu on 11 May 1943, which led to the recapture of the island from the Japanese during World War II.
