= 6-inch/53-caliber gun =

6"/53 caliber naval gun
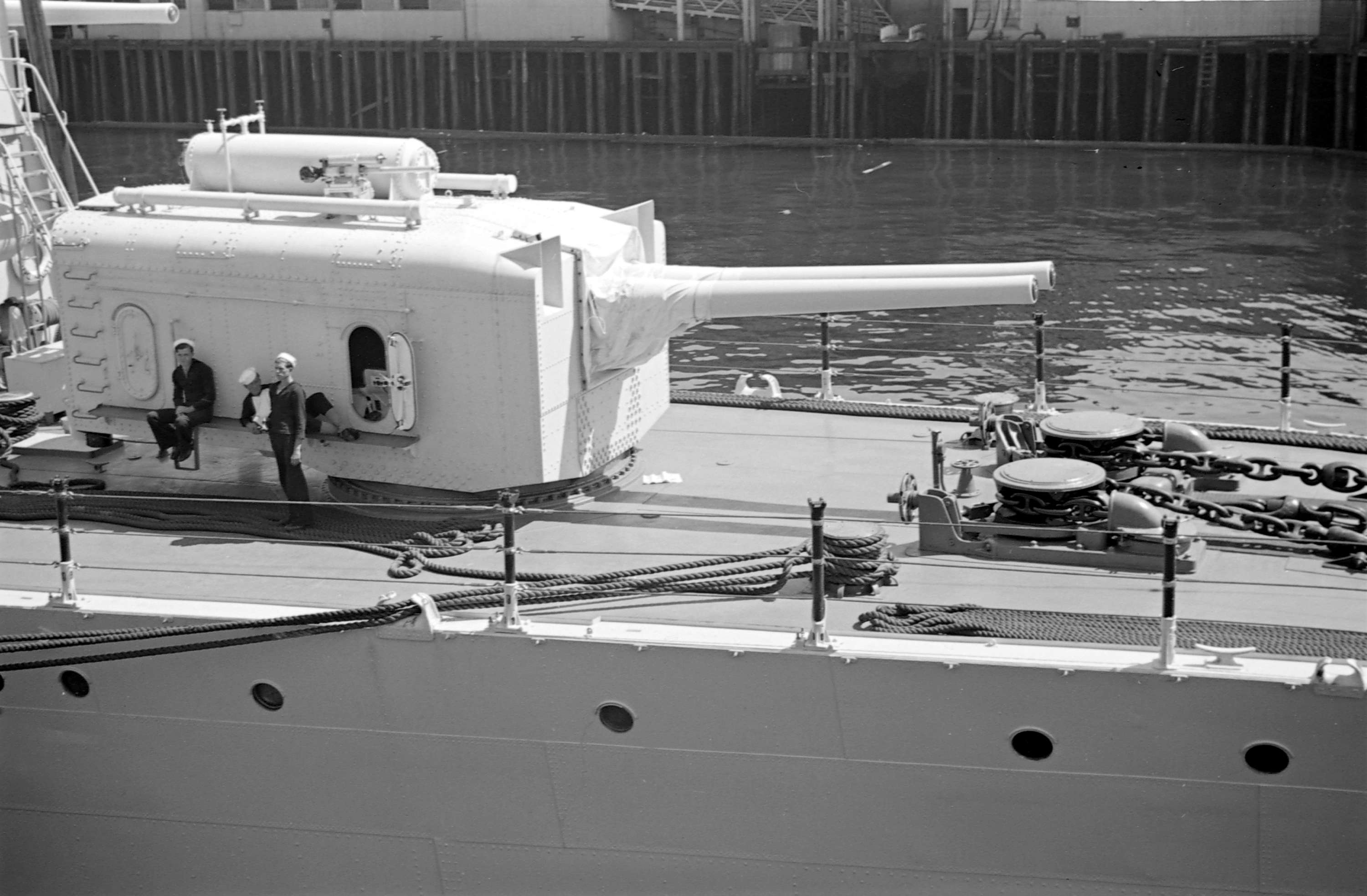
- Forward Mark 16 turret aboard USS Cincinnati (CL-6).
- Type: Naval gun

Service history
- In service: 1920 - 1945
- Used by: United States Navy, Soviet Navy
- Wars: World War II

Production history
- Variants: Guns Mk 12, Mk 14, Mk 15, Mk 18; Mountings Mk 13, Mk 16, Mk 17

Specifications
- Barrel length: 26.5 feet (8 m) bore (53 calibers)
- Shell: 105 pounds (48 kg)
- Caliber: 152 millimeters (6 in)
- Muzzle velocity: 900 meters per second (2,950 ft/s)
- Maximum firing range: 23,130 meters (25,295 yd)

The 6"/53 caliber gun (spoken "six-inch-fifty-three-caliber") formed the main battery of some United States Navy light cruisers and three US submarines built during the 1920s.

== Description ==
United States naval gun terminology indicates the gun fired a projectile 6 inches (15 cm) in diameter, and the barrel was 53 calibers long (barrel length is 6 inch x 53 = 318 inches or 8 meters.) The gun with side swing Welin breech block and Smith-Asbury mechanism weighed about 10 tonnes and used a silk bag containing 44-pounds (20 kg) of smokeless powder to give a 105-pound (47.6 kg) projectile a velocity of 3000 feet per second (900 m/s). Early Marks were built-up guns with a liner, tube, full-length jacket, and 2 hoops; but the Mark 14 gun was of monobloc construction. Useful life expectancy was 700 effective full charges (EFC) per liner.

== Mark 13 casemate mounting ==
These guns were installed as the primary battery on the Omaha-class cruisers, and were intended for the secondary battery of the never-completed Lexington-class battlecruisers and South Dakota-class battleships. Maximum range was 21,000 yd (19,200 m) at the maximum elevation of 20 degrees.

== Mark 16 turret mounting ==
This two-gun turret was a design modification to improve the range and broadside of the Omaha-class cruisers. Maximum range was 25,300 yd (23,130 m) at the maximum elevation of 30 degrees.

== Mark 17 wet mounting ==
These single open mounts were installed fore and aft of the conning tower on USS Argonaut (SM-1), USS Narwhal (SS-167), and USS Nautilus (SS-168). Maximum range was 23,300 yd (21,310 m) at the maximum elevation of 25 degrees.

== Surviving examples ==
Two guns from USS Narwhal (SS-167) are preserved at the Naval Submarine Base New London in Groton, Connecticut. The ship was present at the attack on Pearl Harbor and the guns were most likely on board at the time.

== See also ==
=== Weapons of comparable role, performance and era ===
- BL 6 inch Mk XXII naval gun : roughly equivalent British gun deployed on battleships
- 152 mm /53 Italian naval gun Models 1926 and 1929 : Italian equivalent

== Sources ==
- Campbell, John (1985). Naval Weapons of World War Two. Naval Institute Press. ISBN 0-87021-459-4.
- Fairfield, A.P. (1921). Naval Ordnance. The Lord Baltimore Press.
