= Admiral Benson =

Admiral Benson may refer to:

- Roy S. Benson (1906–1995), U.S. Navy rear admiral
- William S. Benson (1855–1932), U.S. Navy admiral

== See also ==
- Howard H. J. Benson (1888–1975), U.S. Navy commodore, equivalent rank to admiral
