= William W. Smith (admiral) =

American Vice admiral

William Ward Smith
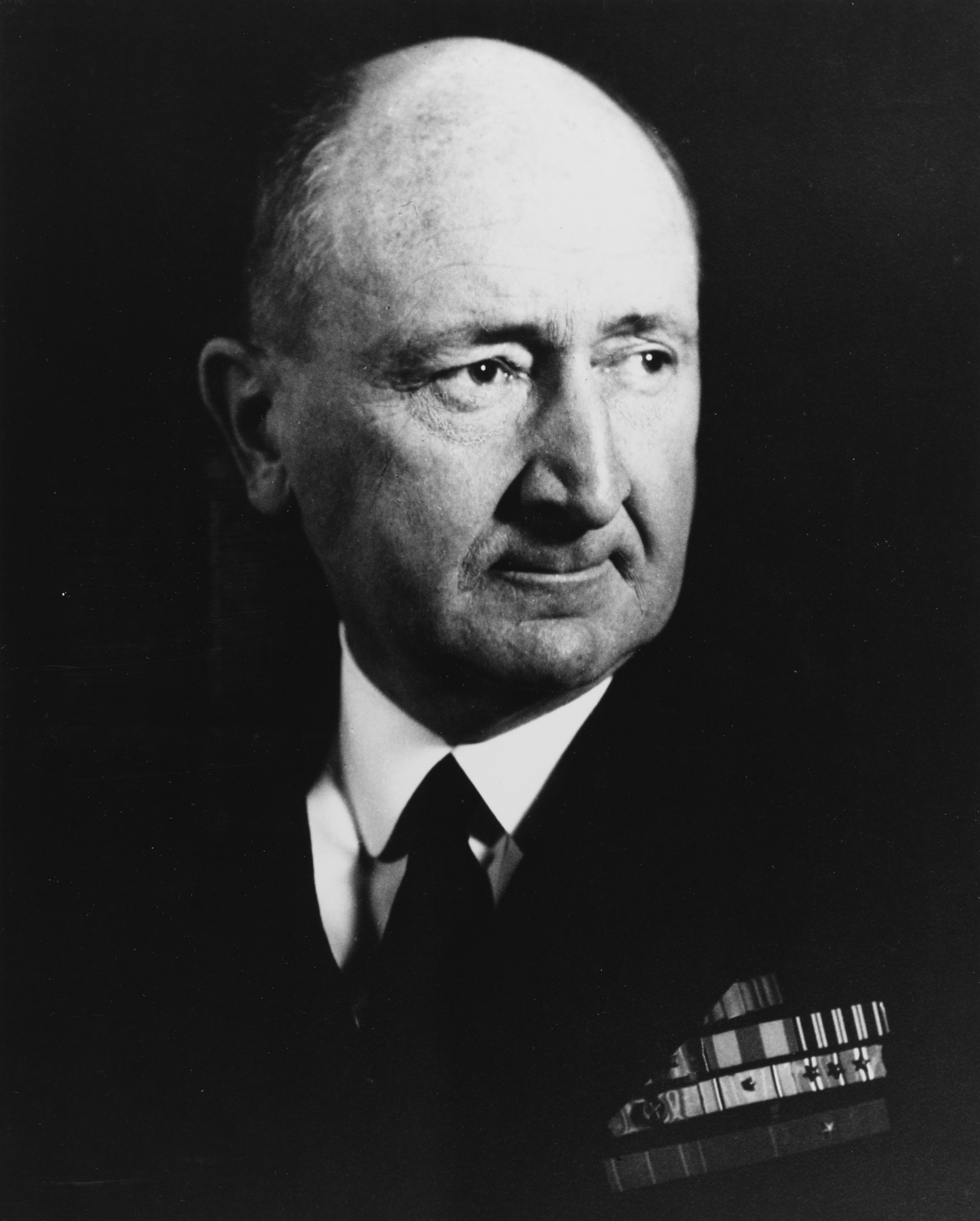
- Smith as a rear admiral, 1944
- Born: February 8, 1888; Newark, New Jersey, US
- Died: May 20, 1966 (aged 78); Bethesda, Maryland, US
- Burial place: United States Naval Academy Cemetery
- Military career
- Allegiance: United States of America
- Branch: United States Navy
- Service years: 1909-1949
- Rank: Vice Admiral
- Nickname: "Poco"
- Commands: ComServPac; Cruiser Division 9 USS Brooklyn
- Conflicts: Chinese revolution of 1911; World War I Nicaraguan Campaign; World War II: Attack on Pearl Harbor; Battle of the Coral Sea; Battle of Midway; Aleutian Islands campaign
- Awards: Distinguished Service Medal; Navy Commendation Medal
- Other work: Chairman, Maritime Commission

William Ward Smith (February 8, 1888 – May 20, 1966) was a decorated officer in the United States Navy with the rank of Vice Admiral. A graduate of the Naval Academy and participant of several conflicts, he distinguished himself during World War II as Commander, Cruiser Task Force during the Battles of the Coral Sea and Midway in May and June 1942.

Following his not very successful command of naval forces during the Aleutian Islands campaign, he was relieved of command and transferred to the administrative post as Director, Naval Transportation Service, where he remained for the rest of the War. In May 1946, Smith was appointed Chairman of the United States Maritime Commission and held this assignment until April 1949.

== Early career ==
William Ward Smith was born on February 8, 1888, in Newark, New Jersey, the son of farmer Samuel Hamilton Smith and Elizabeth Zelander, and moved as a child with his family to Springfield Township, Union County, New Jersey. He graduated from the Springfield High School in June 1905 and earned an appointment to the United States Naval Academy at Annapolis, Maryland. While at the academy, Smith was nicknamed "Poco", which was an abbreviation of "Pocahontas" and was given to him by an academy upperclassman, who suggested that his dark complexion and prominent nose showed he was an illegitimate descendant of the famous Native American woman. Smith was also active in track, football and Naval Academy Rifle Team and received badge as Sharpshooter Expert. He was also awarded the Class of 1871 Sword for excellence in practical and theoretical ordnance and gunnery.

Among his classmates were several future admirals and generals including future four-star admirals Alan G. Kirk, Jesse B. Oldendorf; lieutenant general Levin H. Campbell Jr.,vice admirals Alva D. Bernhard, Olaf M. Hustvedt, Monroe Kelly, Theodore S. ' Ping ' Wilkinson; and rear admirals Howard H. J. Benson, Joel W. Bunkley, Freeland A. Daubin, Sherman S. Kennedy, Benjamin McCandlish, Harold C. Train, Clifford E. Van Hook.

Smith graduated third in his class as Passed Midshipman with Bachelor of Science degree on June 4, 1909, and was assigned to the battleship Michigan, operating with the Atlantic Fleet. He took part in the training maneuvers off New England and was transferred to the recently commissioned battleship North Dakota in September 1910. Smith participated in the normal peacetime routine of training cruises, fleet maneuvers, and gunnery drills in the Atlantic and in the Caribbean and took part in a good-will visit to Great Britain and France.

On June 4, 1911, Smith was commissioned Ensign after serving two years at sea required then by law. He was subsequently detached from North Dakota and sent to Wakefield, Massachusetts, where he trained with the Navy Rifle Team. Smith then took part in the National Rifle Matches at Camp Perry, Ohio, and was assigned to the armored monitor Monterey, operating with the Asiatic Station at U.S. Naval Base Subic Bay at Olongapo, Philippines. With the outbreak of Chinese revolution, Monterey was ordered to Amoy, China, to protect American interests and several days later to Fuzhou and Shantou with same mission. Smith was a member of the landing parties on each occasion and then returned to Olongapo, where he assumed command of dry dock Dewey.

While in this capacity, Smith was promoted to Lieutenant (junior grade) on June 5, 1914, and assumed command of Hull Division at Subic Bay. He was later transferred to the gunboat Wilmington and took part in patrolling in the Chinese waters, before he was ordered back to the United States in October that year. Smith was assigned back to the battleship North Dakota, where he served in 1910 and subsequently to the battleship Utah operating in the Atlantic.

In July 1915, Smith was ordered to Washington, D.C., where he was assigned to the Office of Naval Communications under Captain William H. G. Bullard. Following the United States' entry into World War I, Smith was promoted to the rank of lieutenant on June 5, 1917, and continued in his service in the Office of Naval Communications until early 1918. He was subsequently ordered to Europe and served successively aboard destroyers Downes and Allen off the coast of Queenstown, Ireland.

Smith was later transferred to the staff of Commander, Destroyer Flotillas operating in the European waters and served as Aide to Captain Joseph K. Taussig until the end of War. For his service during the War, Smith was decorated with a Special Letter of Commendation by the Navy Department and Order of Leopold by Belgium. He was also promoted to the temporary rank of lieutenant commander.

== Interwar period ==
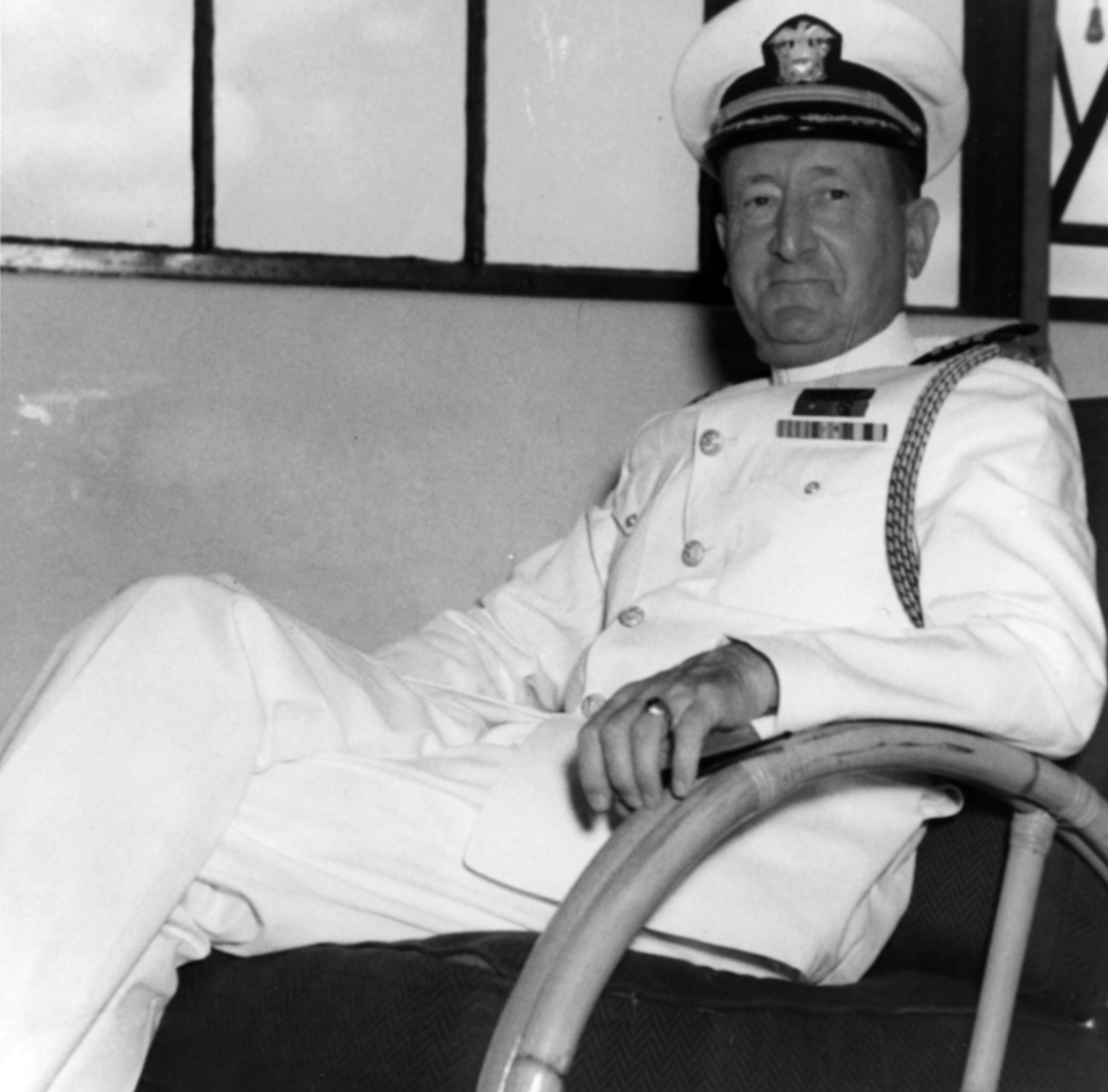
Smith as captain in 1941

Following his return to the United States in February 1919, Smith assumed command of destroyer Fairfax and commanded her within the patrols along the East coast and in the Caribbean, before he took her to the Azores in May 1919 to take up station as an observer of the historic first aerial crossing of the Atlantic made by Navy seaplanes. He was transferred to command of destroyer Herbert in October 1920 and resumed his patrol duties along the East coast.

In March 1921, Smith was ordered to the Bureau of Engineering and served under Rear Admiral John K. Robison until August 1923, when he was ordered back for sea duty to command of destroyer Williamson. He led Williamson during the series of gunnery drills off New York City and participated in the maneuvers with the Scouting Fleet. Smith was transferred to the staff of Commander, Scouting Fleet in February 1925 and served as Aide and Flag Secretary to Vice Admiral Josiah S. McKean.

Smith remained in that assignment until September 1926, when he was promoted to commander and reported for duty to Naval Torpedo Station at Newport, Rhode Island, as Manufacturing officer. By the end of July 1929, he was appointed commanding officer of gunboat Sacramento operating with the Special Service Squadron in Central American Waters. Smith participated in the patrols along the coast of Nicaragua during the protection of American interests there and was commended by the Secretary of the Navy, Charles F. Adams III for salvaging the steamer Heilo, which had run aground at the entrance of Harbor of Corinto and was blocking the entrance to that harbor. He also received Nicaraguan Presidential Medal of Merit with Diploma from President Adolfo Díaz.

In June 1931, Smith was sent back to the United States Naval Academy at Annapolis, Maryland, and assumed duty as Executive officer for the Commandant of Midshipmen, Henry D. Cooke. While in this capacity, he was co-responsible for the professional development and day-to-day activities of all 4,500 Midshipmen in the Cadet-Brigade. Smith remained in that capacity under following Commandant of Midshipmen, Ralston S. Holmes until June 1934, when he was appointed an Executive officer of cruiser Salt Lake City.

Following the period of sea duty off the West Coast of the United States, Smith reported as Aide and Fleet Operations officer on the staff of Commander-in-Chief, United States Fleet under Admiral Joseph M. Reeves and served in this capacity until June 1936, when he was ordered for his third tour to the Naval Academy at Annapolis. He was subsequently appointed Head of the Department of Mathematics and while in this capacity, he was promoted to captain on March 1, 1937.

== World War II ==
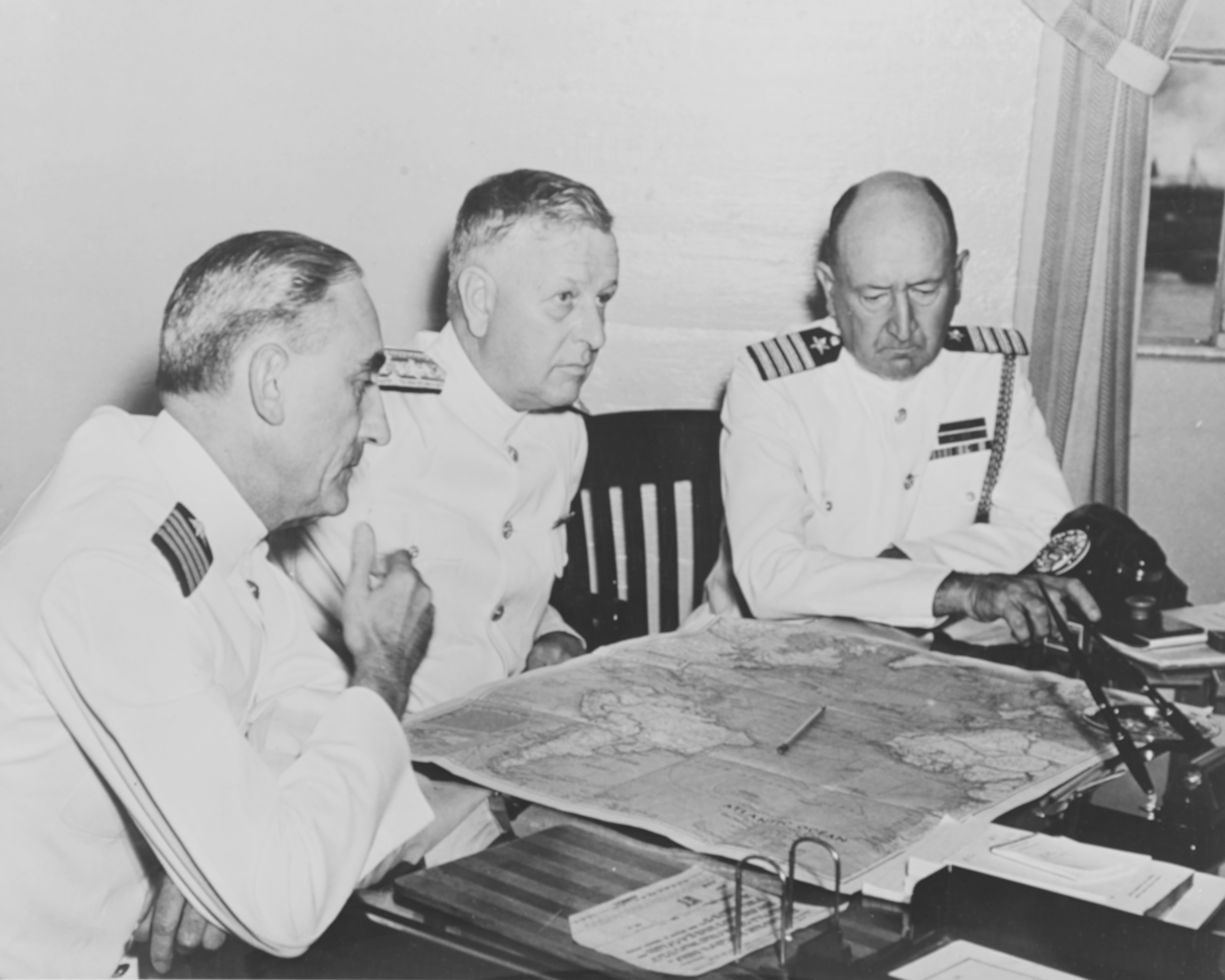
Smith (right) confers with Admiral Husband E. Kimmel, Commander-in-Chief, Pacific Fleet, (center) and his Operations Officer and Assistant Chief of Staff, Captain Walter S. DeLany (left), at Pearl Harbor, 1941.

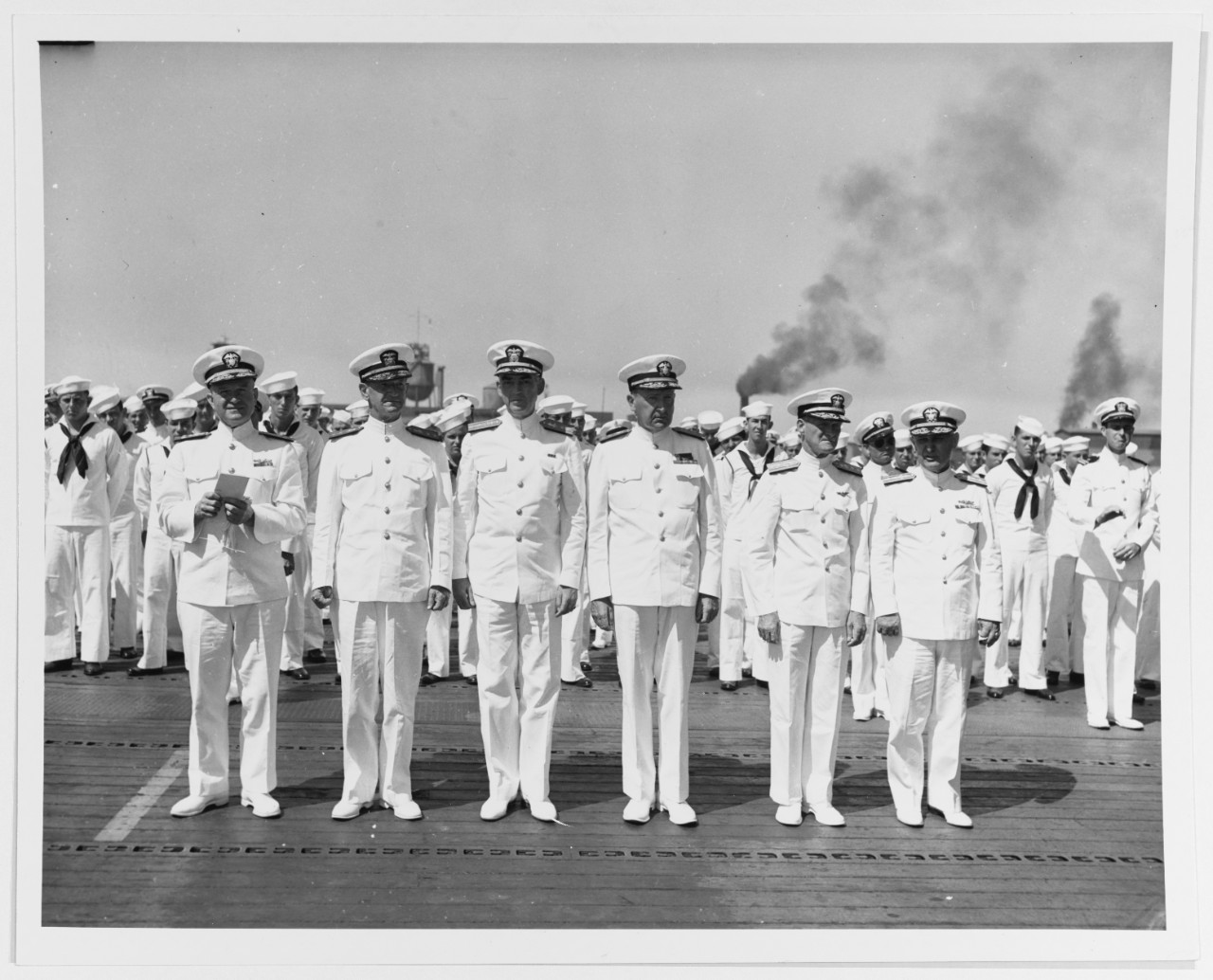
At a shipboard awards ceremony, held at Pearl Harbor on June 17, 1942. The officers are (left to right): William L. Calhoun, Frank J. Fletcher, Thomas C. Kinkaid, Smith, Marc A. Mitscher and Robert H. English.

In May 1939, Smith assumed command of light cruiser Brooklyn and patrolled the Atlantic along the East Coast of the United States in the opening weeks of the War. The Brooklyn was later transferred to the Pacific and participated in the opening of the Golden Gate International Exposition in February 1940. Smith then commanded his ships during the patrols along the West Coast until February 1941, when he was ordered to Pearl Harbor, Hawaii, for new assignment.

Smith subsequently assumed duty as chief of staff and aide to the Commander-in-Chief, Pacific Fleet under Admiral Husband E. Kimmel and served in this capacity at the time of the surprise Japanese Attack on Pearl Harbor on December 7, 1941. Smith himself was located at his quarters at Fort DeRussy and witnessed the attack on Pacific Fleet ships on Oahu.

Unlike Admiral Kimmel, Smith survived personnel changes following the attack and continued under new Pacific Fleet commander, Admiral Chester Nimitz as his Administrative Chief of Staff. He remained in that assignment until January 8, 1942, when he was promoted to the rank of Rear admiral and assumed duty as Commander, Cruiser Task Force Eleven, consisting of cruisers Astoria, Chester and Portland.

Smith commanded his ships as the cruiser escort for Task Force 17 centered around aircraft carrier Yorktown and took part in the battles of the Coral Sea in May 1942 and Midway in June that year. The units under his command caused the infliction of heavy damage on attacking Japanese air forces with ultimate success for U.S. forces in these distinctive engagements. Unfortunately the aircraft carrier Yorktown was sunk at Midway on June 7, 1942. For his leadership during that battles, Smith was decorated with Navy Distinguished Service Medal.

By the end of June, Smith assumed command of Cruiser Division 9, comprising heavy cruisers Indianapolis and Louisville. He then sailed to North Pacific, where he was given additional duty as Commander of surface elements of North Pacific Force. He subsequently led his forces during the bombardment of Kiska in the Aleutian Islands and arrived off the island on the beginning of August 1942.

Smith subsequently ordered his seaplanes for reconnaissance mission, but all were promptly shot down or driven off by the defending Japanese Rufe seaplane fighters, which then directed Japanese coastal artillery against Smith's force. He then ordered bombardment of Japanese positions at the harbor, but due to dense fog all shells missed the Japanese facilities by half a mile. Smith's displeased superior admiral, Frank J. Fletcher relieved Smith in late 1942 and succeeded him with Charles McMorris.

Smith was ordered back to the United States and reported for duty as Director of Naval Transportation Service in Washington, D.C., in January 1943, remaining in that capacity for the next two years and was responsible for the coordination and administration of troop and supply ships. During his tenure, the number of merchant‑type vessels commissioned by and allocated to the Navy increased from 150 to 500. For his service in this capacity, Smith received the Navy Commendation Medal.

On March 6, 1945, Smith was promoted to the temporary rank of Vice admiral and assumed command of Service Force, Pacific Fleet with headquarters at Pearl Harbor, Hawaii. While in this capacity, he was responsible for the Oilers, Gasoline Tankers, Repair Ships, Ammunition Ships, Destroyer Tenders and Submarine tenders of the Pacific Fleet.

== Postwar service ==
Following the War, Smith was appointed a member of the General Board of the Navy in February 1946 and three months later was appointed Chairman of the United States Maritime Commission as substitute for Vice admiral Emory S. Land. While in this capacity, Smith was an advocate of strong American merchant marine operated by private enterprise and during his tenure, the contracts on construction of luxury ocean liners, United States, Independence and Constitution and were ordered. Smith was criticized by the U.S. Senate for overpriced contracts and retired in April 1949.

In 1950, Smith was appointed Vice President of Fruehauf Trailer Corporation of Detroit, Michigan, and remained in that capacity until 1956. He was subsequently appointed a President of the United States Naval Academy Alumni Association and served in this capacity for one year.

Vice Admiral William W. Smith died on May 20, 1966, aged 78, in Bethesda, Maryland, and was buried with full military honors at United States Naval Academy Cemetery at Annapolis, Maryland. His wife, Elizabeth Purdy is buried beside him. They had together one son, William Ward Smith Jr., who graduated from the United States Military Academy at West Point, New York, and retired as a colonel in the United States Army.

== Decorations ==
Here is the ribbon bar of Vice Admiral Smith:

1st Row	Navy Distinguished Service Medal		
2nd Row	Navy Commendation Medal	Navy Expeditionary Medal	World War I Victory Medal with Destroyer Clasp
3rd Row	Second Nicaraguan Campaign Medal	American Defense Service Medal with Fleet Clasp	Asiatic–Pacific Campaign Medal with four 3/16 inch service stars
4th Row	American Campaign Medal	World War II Victory Medal	Navy Rifle Marksmanship Ribbon
5th Row	Navy Pistol Marksmanship Ribbon	Order of Leopold, Officer (Belgium)	Nicaraguan Presidential Medal of Merit with Diploma
