= USS Harding =

Two ships in the United States Navy have been named USS Harding, in honor of Seth Harding.

- USS Harding (DD-91), was a Wickes-class destroyer in World War I
- USS Harding (DD-625), was a Gleaves-class destroyer reclassified as DMS-28.
