= USS Chew =

Wickes-class destroyer

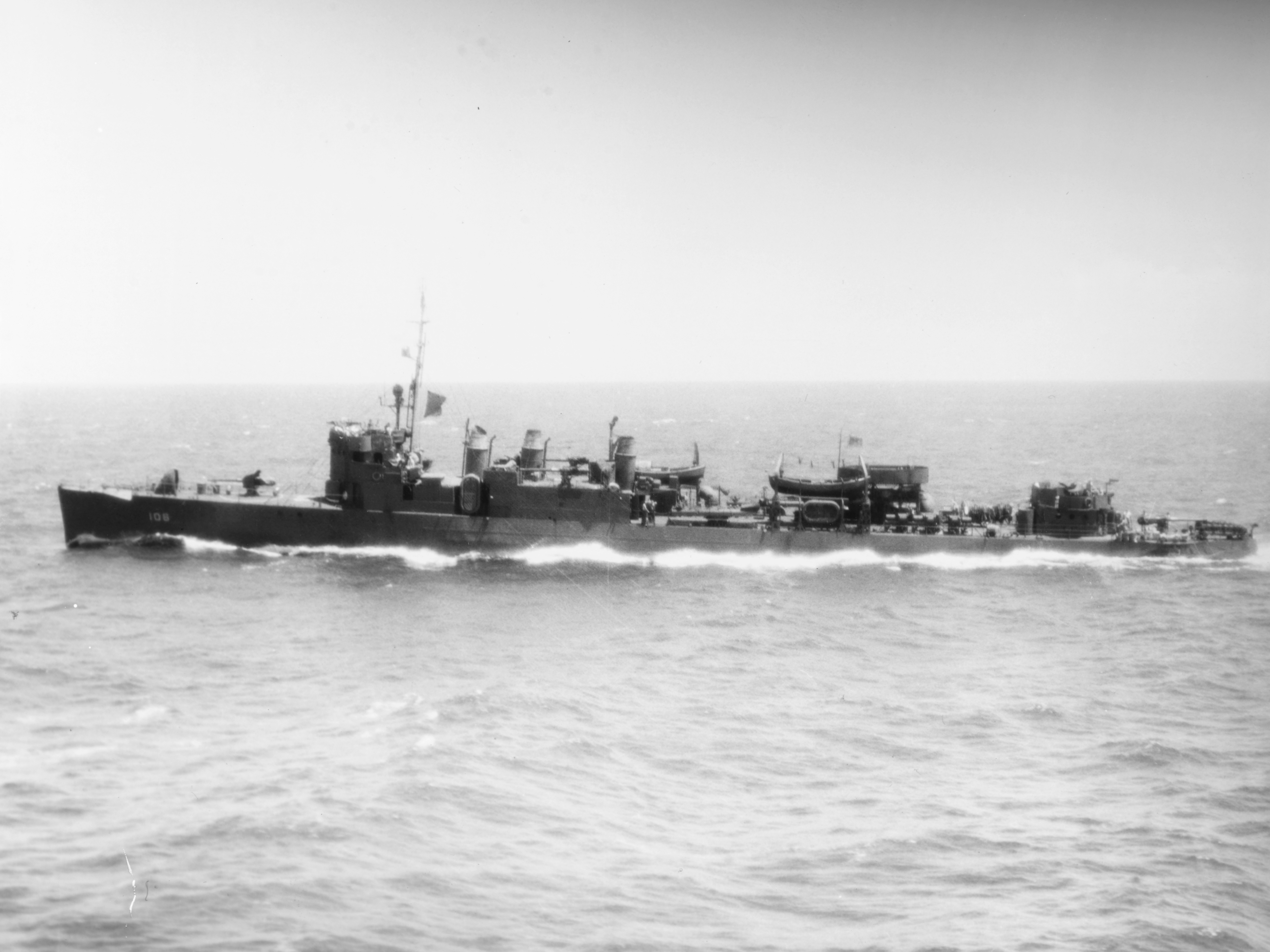
- USS Chew (DD-106) in August 1945

History

United States
- Name: USS Chew
- Namesake: Samuel Chew
- Builder: Union Iron Works, San Francisco, California
- Laid down: 2 January 1918
- Launched: 26 May 1918
- Commissioned: 12 December 1918
- Decommissioned: 1 June 1922
- Recommissioned: 14 October 1940
- Decommissioned: 15 October 1945
- Stricken: 1 November 1945
- Fate: Sold 4 October 1946

General characteristics
- Class & type: Wickes-class destroyer
- Displacement: 1,060 tonnes (1,040 long tons; 1,170 short tons)
- Length: 314 ft 5 in (95.8 m)
- Beam: 31 ft 9 in (9.7 m)
- Draft: 8 ft 6 in (2.6 m)
- Speed: 35 knots (65 km/h)
- Complement: 113 officers and enlisted
- Armament: 4 × 4 in (102 mm) guns; 12 × 21 in (533 mm) torpedo tubes

USS Chew (DD-106) was a Wickes-class destroyer in the United States Navy during World War I and World War II.

From 1918 to 1922, Chew operated along the East Coast of the United States on patrol and training duties, including escorting a transatlantic voyage of Curtiss NC seaplanes. In 1940, she was recommissioned and operated out of Pearl Harbor. During the 7 December 1941 attack on Pearl Harbor, she brought her guns to bear against aircraft of the Empire of Japan, and two of her men were killed helping to man the battleship Pennsylvania. For the remainder of the war, Chew operated out of the port on escort and patrol duties, until she was decommissioned in 1945.

== Namesake ==
Samuel Chew was born circa 1750 in Virginia. A resident of Connecticut, was appointed by the Marine Committee on 17 June 1777 to command the Continental Navy brigantine USS Resistance with which he had much success against British commerce. The brigantine, carrying ten quarter-pounders, fell in with a British Letter-of-Marque (20 guns) on 4 March 1778. In the hand-to-hand struggle which ensued, Captain Chew was killed but his ship managed to break off the battle with its superior opponent and return safely to Boston.

== Design and construction ==
Chew was one of 111 Wickes-class destroyers built by the United States Navy between 1917 and 1919. She, along with seven of her sisters, were constructed at Union Iron Works shipyards in San Francisco, California using specifications and detail designs drawn up by Bethlehem Steel.

She had a standard displacement of 1,060 tonnes (1,043 long tons; 1,168 short tons) an overall length of 314 feet 5 inches (95.8 m), a beam of 31 feet 9 inches (9.7 m) and a draught of 8 feet 6 inches (2.6 m). On trials, Harding reached a speed of 35 knots (65 km/h; 40 mph). She was armed with four 4"/50 caliber guns and twelve 21-inch (533 mm) torpedo tubes. She had a regular crew complement of 113 officers and enlisted men. She was driven by two Curtis steam turbines powered by four Yarrow boilers.

Specifics on Chew's performance are not known, but she was one of the group of Wickes-class destroyers designed by Bethlehem Steel, built from a different design than the 'Liberty type' destroyers constructed from detail designs drawn up by Bath Iron Works, which used Parsons or Westinghouse turbines. The non-'Liberty' type destroyers deteriorated badly in service, and in 1929 all 60 of this group were retired by the Navy. Actual performance of these ships was far below intended specifications especially in fuel economy, with most only able to make 2,300 nautical miles (4,300 km; 2,600 mi) at 15 knots (28 km/h; 17 mph) instead of the design standard of 3,100 nautical miles (5,700 km; 3,600 mi) at 20 knots (37 km/h; 23 mph). The class also suffered problems with turning and weight.

Chew was the first and only ship commissioned in the U.S. Navy named for Samuel Chew, who had been a Continental Navy officer killed in the Revolutionary War.

== Service history ==
Chew was launched on 26 May 1918 out of San Francisco, sponsored by F. X. Gygax. She was commissioned on 12 December 1918.

She sailed for the East Coast of the United States on 21 December 1918, and arrived in port at Newport, Rhode Island on 10 January 1919. After brief repairs at port in New York City, New York and refresher training at Guantanamo Bay Naval Base, she cleared New York on 28 April and embarked as an escort during the first transatlantic seaplane flight, made by Curtiss NC-4 aircraft. Following this duty, she visited to the Azores, Gibraltar, Malta, and Constantinople before returning to New York on 5 June. After repairs, she steamed for San Diego, California, leaving New York on 17 September and arriving in San Diego on 12 October. Beginning on 19 November 1919, she was placed in reduced commission, operating only infrequently with Naval reservists of Reserve Division 10 until she was placed out of commission on 1 June 1922.

At a part of the mobilization effort preceding the U.S. entry into World War II, Chew was recommissioned on 14 October 1940, assigned to Defense Force, 14th Naval District. She arrived at Pearl Harbor on 17 December 1940 which she made her home port. She spent the next year conducting patrols and had training duty from Pearl Harbor. She was assigned to Destroyer Division 80, with sister ships Ward and Schley., and the Sampson-class destroyer Allen.

On the morning of 7 December 1941, Chew was moored in Berth X-5, alongside Allen and the decommissioned Baltimore, which was being used for storage. At the outbreak of the attack on Pearl Harbor by the Empire of Japan that morning, Chew brought one of her 3"/23 caliber guns online and began firing at 08:03, under the command of her executive officer. At 08:11, two of her .50 caliber machine guns were also brought online and began firing. The 3-inch (76 mm) gun scored one Japanese aircraft shot down and two damaged, and the machine guns observed no hits. Chew maintained continuous fire from these weapons until 09:34, when the last of the Japanese aircraft departed. She then got underway and began patrolling for Japanese submarine activity, just southwest of the port entrance buoy. She pinged eight possible contacts and dropped 28 depth charges, which her commander, H. R. Hummer Jr., reported two Japanese submarines destroyed. Subsequent evidence does not suggest Chew struck any Japanese submarines. In the chaos of the attack, a number of Chew crew members also disembarked and came aboard nearby battleship Pennsylvania, which was in drydock, to assist in manning guns, forming ammunition trains, and fighting fires. Aboard Pennsylvania, two Chew crewman were killed in defending the ship, Seaman Second Class Matthew J. Agola and Fireman Third Class Clarence A. Wise.

From 1941 through the end of World War II, Chew operated out of Pearl Harbor on patrol. She took on periodic escort duties among the Hawaiian Islands and on training duty for submarines. She made occasional trips to San Francisco and Seattle escorting convoys and screening for other Navy ships, inter-island escort, and submarine training duty. Following the end of the war, she departed Pearl Harbor on 21 August 1945 and arrived at Philadelphia 13 September. She was decommissioned there on 10 October 1945, and sold for scrap on 4 October 1946. Chew received one battle star for World War II service.

The ship's bell survived the scrapping and sold to private owner.

== Sources ==
- Dictionary of American naval fighting ships / Vol.2, Historical sketches : letters C through F, Washington, D.C.: Department of the Navy, 1963, OCLC 551573855, archived from the original on 30 January 2006
- Friedman, Norman (2003), United States Destroyers: An Illustrated Design History, Annapolis, Maryland: Naval Institute Press, ISBN 978-1-55750-442-5
- Gardiner, Robert; Gray, Randal (1985), Conway's All the World's Fighting Ships 1906–1921, Volume 2, Annapolis, Maryland: Naval Institute Press, ISBN 978-0-87021-907-8
- McWilliams, Bill (2011), Sunday in Hell: Pearl Harbor Minute by Minute, New York City, New York: E. Rights/E-Reads, Ltd. Publishers, ISBN 978-1617564123
