= William Billingsley =

William Billingsley may refer to:

- William Billingsley (aviator) (1887–1913), American naval aviator, namesake of the USS Billingsley
- William Billingsley (artist) (1758–1828), English painter of porcelain
