= USS Jenkins (DD-42) =

Paulding-class destroyer

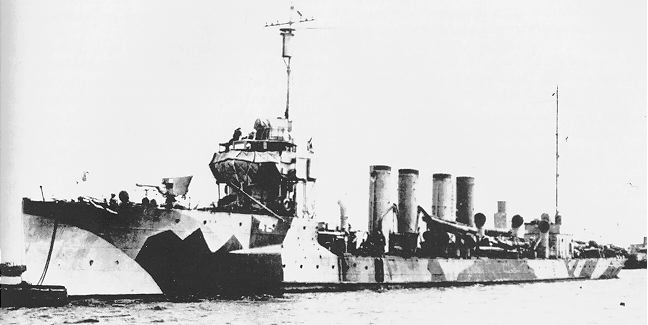
- USS Jenkins (DD-42) moored in a European port, possibly Queenstown, Ireland, circa 1918. She is painted in dazzle camouflage.

History

United States
- Name: Jenkins
- Namesake: Rear Admiral Thornton A. Jenkins
- Builder: Bath Iron Works, Bath, Maine
- Cost: $650,712.43
- Laid down: 24 March 1911
- Launched: 29 April 1912
- Sponsored by: Miss Alice Jenkins
- Commissioned: 15 June 1912
- Decommissioned: 31 October 1919
- Stricken: 8 March 1935
- Identification: Hull symbol:DD-42; Code letters:NID
- Fate: Sold for scrap in 1935

General characteristics
- Class & type: Paulding-class destroyer
- Displacement: 742 long tons (754 t) normal; 887 long tons (901 t) full load
- Length: 293 ft 10 in (89.56 m)
- Beam: 27 ft (8.2 m)
- Draft: 8 ft 4 in (2.54 m) (mean)
- Installed power: 12,000 ihp (8,900 kW)
- Propulsion: 4 × boilers; 3 × Parsons Direct Drive Turbines; 3 × shafts
- Speed: 29.5 kn (33.9 mph; 54.6 km/h); 31.27 kn (35.98 mph; 57.91 km/h) (Speed on Trial)
- Complement: 4 officers 87 enlisted
- Armament: 5 × 3 in (76 mm)/50 caliber guns; 6 × 18 inch (450 mm) torpedo tubes (3 × 2)

The first USS Jenkins (DD-42) was a modified Paulding-class destroyer in the United States Navy during World War I. She was named for Rear Admiral Thornton A. Jenkins.

== Construction and commissioning ==
Jenkins was laid down on 24 March 1911 by Bath Iron Works at Bath, Maine. She was launched on 29 April 1912, sponsored by Miss Alice Jenkins, daughter of Rear Admiral Thornton A. Jenkins, and commissioned on 15 June 1912.

== Pre-World War I ==
In the years that preceded World War I, Jenkins, based at Newport, Rhode Island, trained with the United States Atlantic Fleet, steaming to the Caribbean for winter maneuvers and operating along the United States East Coast in summer. In addition, she steamed to Tampico, Mexico, in mid-April 1914 to support the American occupation of Veracruz. On 1 October 1916 she collided with the lighter Trilby at Sandwich, Massachusetts, that resulted in damage to Trilby.

== World War I ==
As the war raged in Europe, Jenkins continued patrol operations along the North American coast in search of possible German U-boats. The patrols and maneuvers sharpened her war-readiness, so that she was ready for any eventuality when she sailed for Europe on 26 May 1917.

Based at Queenstown, Ireland, Jenkins and her sister destroyers patrolled the eastern Atlantic, escorting convoys and rescuing survivors of sunken merchant ships. She continued escort and patrol duty for the duration of the war. Though she made several submarine contacts, no results were determined.

On 16 January 1918, Jenkins and the destroyer USS Shaw were escorting the American armed passenger ship SS New York in the Irish Sea during a voyage to Liverpool, England. As darkness fell at around 18:00, Jenkins took station astern of New York while Shaw continued to patrol ahead. At about 19:30, the U.S. Navy gun crews manning New York′s forward guns sighted a suspicious object on her port beam, and they fired seven rounds at it. New York swung slightly to starboard, and the guns received orders to cease firing. Meanwhile, New York′s after gun crew sighted Jenkins on New York′s starboard quarter. Believing Jenkins still to be astern of New York and not realizing that New York′s swing to starboard had placed Jenkins on her starboard quarter, the after gun fired one shot. It hit Jenkins, killing one man and wounding four. Jenkins immediately turned on her running lights, and New York ceased fire.

Following the signing of the Armistice with Germany on 11 November 1918, Jenkins sailed for the United States, arriving at Boston, Massachusetts, on 3 January 1919.

== Inter-war period ==
Jenkins operated along the U.S. East Coast until arriving at Philadelphia, Pennsylvania on 20 July 1919. She remained there until decommissioning on 31 October 1919. While in reserve, she received hull classification symbol DD-42 when the U.S. Navy adopted its modern hull classification system on 17 July 1920.

Jenkins never returned to active service. She was scrapped in 1935 in accordance with the London Naval Treaty.

== Notable commander officers ==
- Lieutenant Commander Frederick V. McNair Jr., recipient of Medal of Honor, commanded Jenkins in 1914.
- Commander Henry D. Cooke, who received the Navy Cross as commanding officer of the destroyer USS Allen, commanded Jenkins from August 1917 to January 1918.
- Lieutenant Commander James L. Kauffman received the Navy Cross for service as commanding officer of Jenkins during World War I.
