= USS Confederacy =

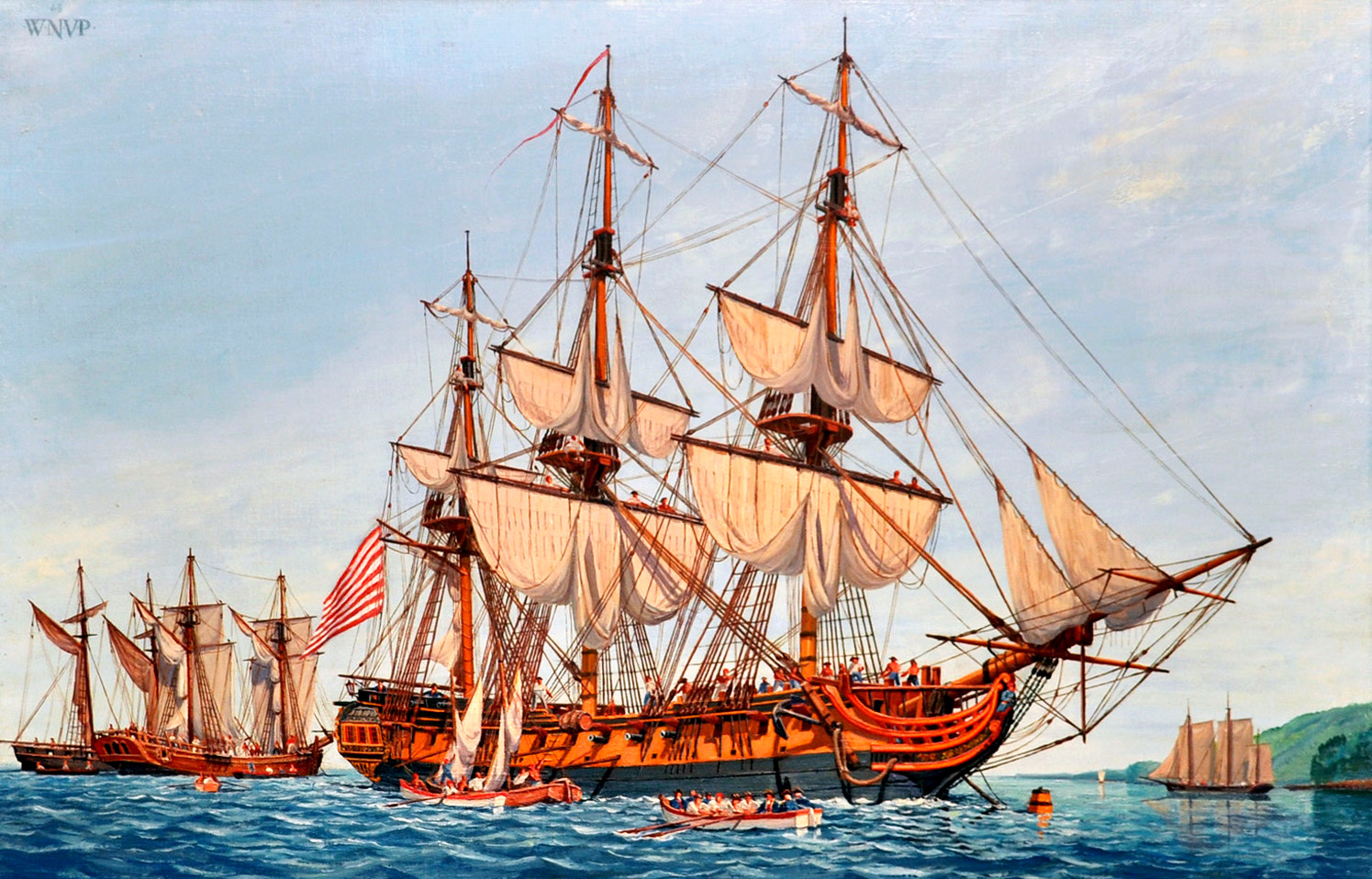
- 1965 painting of Confederacy by William Nowland Van Powell

History

United States
- Name: USS Confederacy
- Builder: Norwich, Connecticut
- Launched: 8 November 1778
- Fate: Captured 14 April 1781

Great Britain
- Name: Confederate
- Acquired: 14 April 1781 by capture
- Fate: Broken up March 1782

General characteristics
- Type: Frigate
- Tons burthen: 959, or 970 86/94 (bm)
- Length: US:153 ft (46.6 m); British; Overall:159 ft 7 in (48.6 m); Keel:133 ft 6 in (40.7 m)
- Beam: US:35 ft 6 in (10.8 m); British::36 ft 9 in (11.2 m)
- Depth of hold: US:12 ft 3 in (3.7 m); British: 12 ft 1 in (3.7 m)
- Complement: 260 officers and men
- Armament: Gun deck: 28 × 12-pounder (5 kg) guns; QD: 8 × 6-pounder (2.7 kg) guns; Fc: 2 × 6-pounder (2.7 kg) guns

USS Confederacy was a 36-gun frigate of the Continental Navy. The British Royal Navy captured her in March 1781. The British renamed her Confederate but never commissioned her. She reached England in about half-a-year and was broken up in 1782.

== Career ==
She was launched on 8 November 1778 at Chatham (Norwich), Connecticut, and towed to New London to be prepared for sea. From 1 May to 24 August 1779 she cruised on the Atlantic coast under the command of Captain Seth Harding. While convoying a fleet of merchantmen, on 6 June, she and Deane captured three prizes, drove off two British frigates and brought the convoy safely into Philadelphia, Pennsylvania.

On 17 September 1779 Confederacy was ordered to carry the French Minister and his family back to France. Later John Jay, the first American Minister to Spain, his secretary, and family were added to the passenger list. During the passage on 7 November 1779 Confederacy was completely dismasted and almost lost, but managed through the skillful seamanship of Captain Harding to reach Martinique early in December. After repairs, she returned to convoy duty.

Captain Nicholson replaced Harding in on 20 October 1780.

Confederacy, back under Harding's command, was homeward bound from Cap-Francois, Saint-Domingue in 1781 with military stores and other supplies and escorting a fleet of 37 merchantmen, when on 14 April she encountered the British warships HMS Roebuck and HMS Orpheus off the Delaware Capes. Harding ordered his crew to strike the colors to the British. Most of the merchantmen she was escorting escaped. Many of her crew were sent to the old prison hulk Jersey, though some ended up in Mill and Forton prisons.

== Fate ==
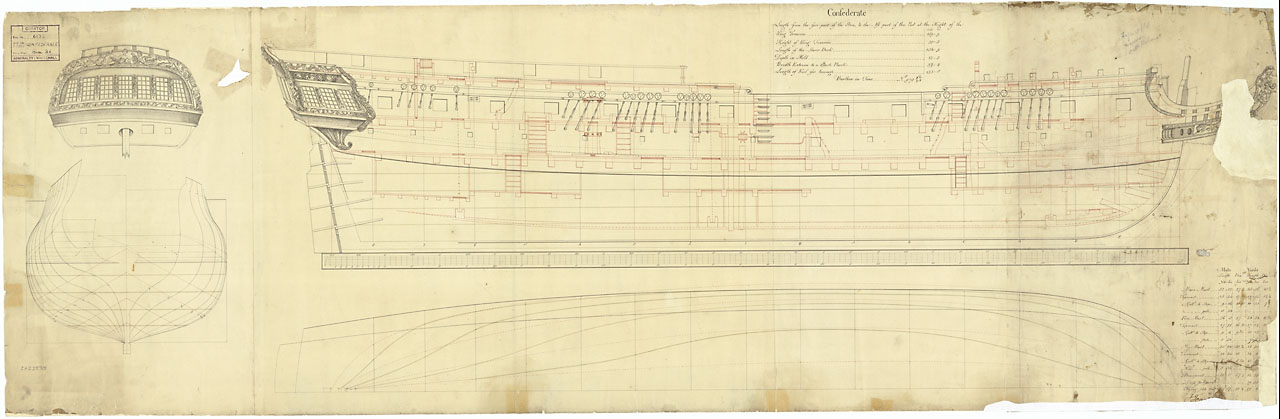
Confederacy, captured and drawn in 1781

The Royal Navy sent her to England, under the command of Captain James Cumming. He paid her off in September 1781. She was never commissioned and was docked on 18 November 1781 at Woolwich. She was broken up there in March 1782.

== See also ==
- List of sailing frigates of the United States Navy
- Bibliography of early American naval history
