= USS Corona =

Steam yacht and US Navy patrol craft

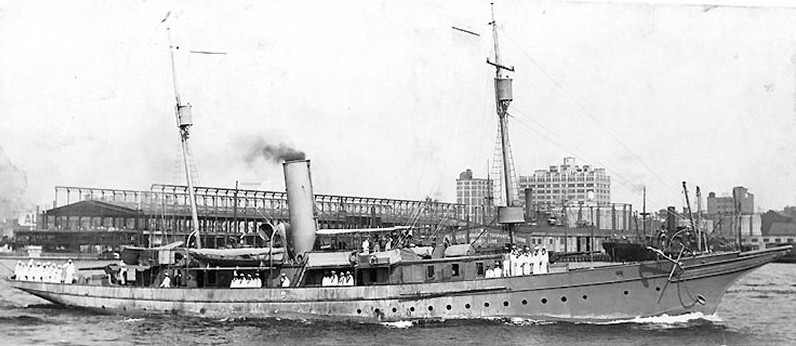
- USS Corona in 1917, probably leaving New York for France

History
- Name: Corona
- Owner: 1905: HA Laughlin; 1921: Clarence H Dodge; 1921: Oscar T Ledberg; 1927: Philip A Curran; 1928: Ferraro Hnos & P Valle
- Operator: 1917: United States Navy
- Port of registry: 1905: (United States) Philadelphia; 1906: (United States) New York; 1928: (Peru) Callao
- Builder: Hawthorns & Co, Leith
- Yard number: 105
- Launched: 22 February 1905
- Completed: May 1905
- Acquired: for US Navy, 10 June 1917
- Commissioned: 20 July 1917
- Decommissioned: 17 May 1919
- Stricken: 4 April 1919
- Identification: by 1910: code letters LBCW; 1917: pennant number SP-813; US Navy: code letters GSVL
- Fate: Capsized and sank 1941

General characteristics
- Type: steam yacht
- Tonnage: 304 GRT, 134 NRT
- Length: 172 ft (52 m) overall; 150.5 ft (45.9 m) registered
- Beam: 23.15 ft (7.06 m)
- Depth: 12.45 ft (3.79 m)
- Installed power: 74 NHP, 650 ihp
- Propulsion: 1 × triple-expansion engine; 1 × screw
- Complement: in US Navy: 63
- Armament: 2 × 3-inch/50-caliber guns

USS Corona (SP-813) was a steel-hulled steam yacht that was launched in Scotland in 1905 as Corona. In 1917 the United States Navy had her converted into an armed yacht. She was based in France until 1918, and then in reserve in Connecticut. In 1921 she was sold back into civilian use. In 1928 she was re-registered in Peru, where she became a merchant ship. She sank off the Peruvian coast in 1941.

== Building and registration ==
Hawthorns & Co of Leith, Scotland built the yacht as yard number 105. She was launched on 22 February 1905 as Corona for HA Laughlin of Pittsburgh. Her lengths were 172 ft (52 m) overall and 150.5 ft (45.9 m) registered. Her beam was 23.15 ft (7.06 m) and her depth was 12.45 ft (3.79 m). Her tonnages were 304 GRT and 134 NRT. She had a single screw, driven by a three-cylinder triple-expansion engine that was rated at 74 NHP or 650 ihp.

Laughlin at first registered her at Philadelphia, but by 1906 had re-registered her at New York. By 1910 her code letters were LBCW.

== Armed yacht ==
The US Navy bought Corona at New York on 10 June 1917. She was converted for naval use, which included arming her with two 3-inch/50-caliber guns. On 20 July she was commissioned at New York as USS Corona, with the pennant number SP-813 and code letters GSVL. Lieutenant Lemuel M Stevens was her first commanding officer.

Corona left New York on 30 July; sailed via St. John's, Newfoundland and the Azores; and on 30 August arrived in Brest, France. From there she escorted convoys and patrolled the English Channel. By the end of August 1918, Lieutenant Commander Howard H. J. Benson had succeeded Lieutenant Stevens as her commanding officer.

The Armistice of 11 November 1918 ended the war. On 5 December 1918 Corona left Brest, and on 28 December she arrived in New London, Connecticut, where she was held in reserve. On 4 April 1919 she was struck from the Navy Directory. She left New London on 5 May 1919; arrived in New York the next day; and was decommissioned on 17 May.

== Later years ==
Lloyd's Register listed the US Navy as Corona's owner until 1922. However, early in 1921 Clarence H Dodge of New York bought Corona. On 1 October 1921 Corona Oscar T Ledberg of Providence, Rhode Island bought her. He already owned the former USS Satilla, which he had renamed Edith. By 1927 Philp A Curran owned Corona. By 1928 Ferraro Hermanos ("Ferraro Brothers") and P Valle owned her, and had registered her in Callao in Peru. By 1930 Lloyd's Register described her as an "ex yacht", as by then she was in commercial merchant trade.

On 25 April 1941, Corona capsized and sank in the Pacific off the Peruvian coast, about 20 nautical miles (37 km) northwest of the Guañape Islands.

== Bibliography ==
- Lloyd's Register of Shipping (PDF). Vol. II.–Steamers and Motorships of 300 tons gross and over. London: Lloyd's Register of Shipping. 1930 – via Southampton City Council.
- Lloyd's Register of Yachts. London: Lloyd's Register of Shipping. 1922 – via Internet Archive.
- Lloyd's Register of Yachts. London: Lloyd's Register of Shipping. 1923 – via Internet Archive.
- Lloyd's Register of Yachts. London: Lloyd's Register of Shipping. 1927 – via Internet Archive.
- Lloyd's Register of Yachts. London: Lloyd's Register of Shipping. 1928 – via Internet Archive.
- Register of Yachts. London: Lloyd's Register of British and Foreign Shipping. 1905 – via Internet Archive.
- Register of Yachts. London: Lloyd's Register of British and Foreign Shipping. 1906 – via Internet Archive.
- Register of Yachts. London: Lloyd's Register of British and Foreign Shipping. 1910 – via Internet Archive.
