= Catherine Brewer Benson =

Early American woman to attend college

Catherine Elizabeth Benson
- Born: Catherine Elizabeth Brewer; January 24, 1822; Augusta, Georgia
- Died: February 27, 1908 (aged 86); Macon, Georgia
- Education: Clinton Female Seminary; Georgia Female College; First Degree (B.A.)
- Spouse: Richard Aaron Benson
- Children: Catherine Benson Melrose; Richard Edward Benson; Thomas Brewer Benson; Eliza Benson Fargo; William S. Benson; Frank Cook Benson; Howard Burke Benson; Gertrude Benson Arnall
- Parent(s): Thomas Aspinwall Brewer (father); Mary Foster Brewer (mother)
- Relatives: Adeline Corbin (sister); Edward Ebenezer Brewer (brother)

Catherine Elizabeth Benson, née Brewer (24 January 1822 – 27 February 1908) was one of the earliest women to earn a college bachelor's degree in the US.

== Life ==
Benson was born on January 24, 1824, in Augusta, Georgia. She was daughter of Thomas Aspinwall Brewer (born August 20, 1792, in Brookline, Massachusetts, died on September 26, 1874, in Macon, Georgia) and Mary Foster Brewer (born February 29, 1796, in Roxbury, Massachusetts, died on January 31, 1871, in Macon) who were married on October 3, 1820, in Roxbury. She had younger sister Adeline (born October 5, 1825, in Lexington, Georgia, died on March 9, 1896, in Macon; she married firstly Napoleon Bonaparte Corbin on August 8, 1850, and secondly Robert B. Clayton on December 21, 1866, in Macon) and younger brother Edward Ebenezer (born June 4, 1828, in Lexington, died June 8, 1864, in Macon; he married Caroline Elizabeth Jones on July 17, 1858, in Fort Valley, Georgia). Her family moved from Massachusetts to Lexington in the 1820s. In 1838 they moved from Lexington to Macon.

== Education ==
In nearby Gray, Georgia, she enrolled in Clinton Female Seminary. The faculty and students, including Benson (Brewer) entered Georgia Female College (currently Wesleyan College) in 1839 when the seminary merged with the college. The college, chartered in 1836, began offering classes in 1839. She is claimed to be the first woman to earn a degree from Wesleyan, based on her name coming first alphabetically among the graduates of the class of 1840. She received diploma on July 16, 1840. Her diploma said that "she had completed the regular course and bestowed on her the First Degree", which was commonly referred to the bachelor's degree. She is remembered each year at the annual meeting of the Wesleyan College Alumnae Association when graduating seniors are inducted into the association using the "Benson Charge", taken from a speech she made to the Class of 1888: Members of the graduating class, demands will be made upon you which were not made upon us. Your training, if you are true to it, will amply qualify you to meet those demands. No wiser blessing could I wish for you than that you may be true to every God-appointed work.

Though Benson has been listed as the first woman to receive a bachelor's degree in the US, women at Mississippi College had been earning such degrees since 1831.

== Marriage and issue ==
She married Richard Aaron Benson (born November 14, 1821, in Putnam County, Georgia, died on October 10, 1877, in Macon) on November 24, 1842, in Macon. They had eight children:

- Catherine Colvard Benson (born November 10, 1844, in Macon, died on January 31, 1885; she married Alex Melrose)
- Richard Edward Benson (born October 20, 1846, in Macon, died c. 1897; he married Emma Haskins on April 20, 1871, in Macon; they had son, Thomas A. Benson)
- Thomas Brewer Benson (born January 22, 1849, in Macon, died in December 1880; he married Hattie E. Freeman on November 24, 1874, in Macon) - railroad conductor
- Eliza Sophie Benson (born December 24, 1850, in Macon, died on September 7, 1912; she married J.M. Fargo)
- William Shepherd Benson - admiral who became the nation's first Chief of Naval Operations, an office created 11 May 1915.
- Frank Cook Benson (born December 17, 1857, in Macon, died on October 57, 1943) - clerk
- Howard Burke Benson (born May 4, 1862, died in September 1887) - clerk
- Gertrude Benson (born November 12, 1864, in Macon, died on January 16, 1952; she married Henry C. Arnall)

Catherine Benson died at her home in Macon on February 27, 1908, at the age of 86 after several weeks of illness.
