= USS Harding (DD-91) =

American Wickes-class destroyer

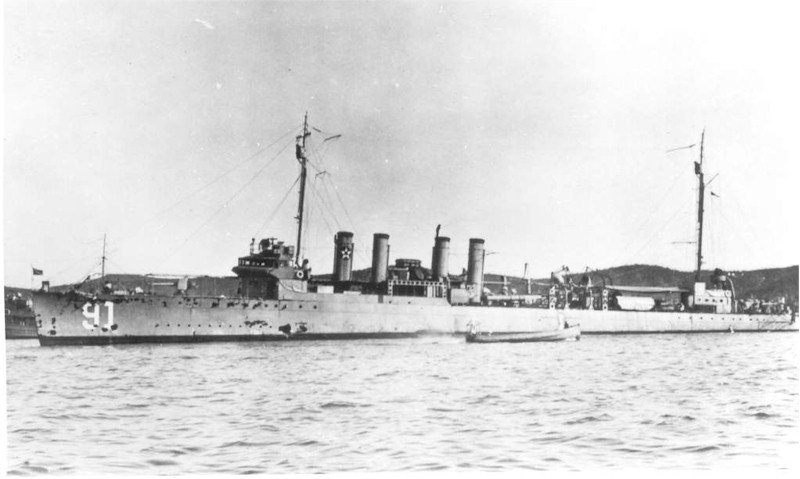
- USS Harding as a seaplane tender at Guantanamo Bay, Cuba, circa 1920–1921

History

United States
- Name: Harding
- Namesake: Seth Harding
- Builder: Union Iron Works, San Francisco, California
- Laid down: 12 February 1918
- Launched: 4 July 1918
- Commissioned: 24 January 1919
- Decommissioned: 1 July 1922
- Stricken: 7 January 1936
- Fate: Sold for scrap, 8 September 1936

General characteristics
- Class & type: Wickes-class destroyer
- Displacement: 1,060 long tons (1,080 t)
- Length: 315 ft 5 in (96.1 m)
- Beam: 31 ft 8 in (9.7 m)
- Draft: 8 ft 6 in (2.6 m)
- Speed: 35 knots (65 km/h)
- Complement: 100 officers and enlisted
- Armament: 4 × 4 in (102 mm)/50 guns; 3 × .30 cal (7.62 mm) machine guns; 12 x 21 in (533 mm) torpedo tubes

USS Harding (DD-91) was a Wickes-class destroyer in the United States Navy during World War I. She was the first ship named in honor of Seth Harding.

Launched in 1918, she undertook training exercises off the East Coast of the United States sporadically for several years. In 1919, she escorted a major transatlantic flight of Curtiss NC seaplane. Later that year, she was selected to be converted into a seaplane tender, and was then used to support naval aviator training off Naval Air Station Pensacola. She took one trip to Veracruz with emergency medical supplies, and was also on hand during aircraft bombing tests against decommissioned German ships, including the sinking of SMS Ostfriesland. She was decommissioned in 1922 and sold for scrapping in 1936.

== Design and construction ==
Harding was one of 111 Wickes-class destroyers built by the United States Navy between 1917 and 1919. She, along with seven of her sisters, were constructed at Union Iron Works shipyards in San Francisco, California using specifications and detail designs drawn up by Bethlehem Steel.

She had a standard displacement of 1,060 tonnes (1,040 long tons; 1,170 short tons) an overall length of 315 feet 5 inches (96.1 m), a beam of 31 feet 8 inches (9.7 m) and a draft of 8 feet 6 inches (2.6 m). On trials, Harding reached a speed of 35 knots (65 km/h). She was armed with four 4"/50 caliber guns, three .30 caliber machine guns, and twelve torpedo tubes 21-inch (533 mm) Mark 15 torpedoes. She had a regular crew complement of 122 officers and enlisted men. She was driven by two Curtis steam turbines powered by four Yarrow boilers.

Specifics on Harding's performance are not known, but she was one of the group of Wickes-class destroyers known unofficially as the 'Liberty Type' to differentiate them from the destroyers constructed from detail designs drawn up by Bath Iron Works, which used Parsons or Westinghouse turbines. The 'Liberty' type destroyers deteriorated badly in service, and in 1929 all 60 of this group were retired by the Navy. Actual performance of these ships was far below intended specifications especially in fuel economy, with most only able to make 2,300 nautical miles (4,260 km) at 15 knots (28 km/h) instead of the design standard of 3,100 nautical miles (5,741 km) at 20 knots (37 km/h). The class also suffered problems with turning and weight.

Harding was the first ship to be named for Seth Harding. The second Harding was a Gleaves-class destroyer, commissioned in 1943.

== Service history ==
Harding was launched on 4 July 1918 from Union Iron Works. She was sponsored by the wife of George A. Armes, and commissioned under the command of Commander Henry D. Cooke. On 3 February 1919, she was assigned to the United States Atlantic Fleet and sailed for Newport, Rhode Island via Santa Cruz, California. Transiting the Panama Canal, she arrived on 18 February. Two days later she moved to Boston, Massachusetts and stood out of that harbor on 21 February, to escort George Washington which was transporting President Woodrow Wilson from the Versailles Conference. Two days later she participated in ceremonies in Boston harbor celebrating the arrival of that ship.

Next, she put in for repairs at Norfolk, Virginia until 8 March, when she left for fleet exercises near Cuba. Following this, Harding left for New York, arriving there on 14 April. On 1 May, she departed as part of a group of destroyers acting as a guide for a flight of Navy Curtiss NC seaplanes across the Atlantic Ocean. Harding provided searchlight illumination by night during the first part of the flight; NC-1 and NC-3 made forced landings near the Azores and Harding rendered assistance to NC-1 before it sank. NC-4, the remaining seaplane, arrived at Ponta Delgada 20 May and as she took off for the last leg of her journey, Harding got underway to provide radio compass signals at sea. After the seaplanes landed at Plymouth, England, to complete the flight on 31 May 1919, Harding visited Brest, France and the Azores before returning to Newport 18 June. For several months, Harding was based out of Newport and Norfolk on training exercises.

After the end of World War I, the U.S. Navy began to convert surplus ships to support its growing seaplane tender program. Several steamers and minelayers were selected in 1919, but Harding was the only destroyer, because it was determined that she would require minimal modifications. Following this success, and as aircraft carrier designs advanced, more ships were designed specifically to support naval aviation. Fourteen Clemson-class destroyers were converted to seaplane tenders in 1938 when it was determined that aircraft production was outpacing the development of these ships. During the conversion of Harding, her three .30 caliber machine guns were removed and her crew complement was reduced to 100 officers and enlisted men. Her torpedo tubes may also have been removed. On 13 December 1919, she reported to the Philadelphia Navy Yard for conversion to a seaplane tender. She completed the conversion at Charleston Navy Yard and on 20 May 1920, she sailed for duty at Pensacola Naval Air Station. Immediately after this, though, Harding was loaded with medical supplies from the American Red Cross and was ordered to Veracruz, Mexico, where an outbreak of bubonic plague necessitated serum and other supplies. She reached Veracruz on 9 June 1920 and unloaded her supplies. She then steamed for Pensacola, Florida, stopping at Tampico on the way, and arrived in Florida on 13 June.

At Pensacola, Harding was assigned to a seaplane pilot training program. She remained there until 4 August 1920, after which she operated in the Caribbean area tending seaplanes until 23 February 1921. She stopped briefly at Philadelphia before heading to Hampton Roads to support bombing tests on surrendered German ships, leaving Norfolk on 21 June. She was present during the bombing tests on SM U-117 and remained assigned to the tests until the sinking of the German battleship SMS Ostfriesland on 21 July 1921. Harding was detached from this duty the next day.

Harding subsequently conducted training exercises out of Newport and other East Coast ports until 27 December 1921, when she arrived at Charleston, South Carolina. Remaining there until 3 April 1922, she sailed to Philadelphia where she decommissioned 1 July 1922. Harding was then sold for scrap on 29 September 1936, to Schiavone-Bonomo Corporation in New York City.

== Sources ==
- Dictionary of American naval fighting ships / Vol.3, Historical sketches : letters G through M, Washington, D.C.: Department of the Navy, 1968, OCLC 551573855
- Friedman, Norman (2003), United States Destroyers: An Illustrated Design History, Annapolis, Maryland: Naval Institute Press, ISBN 978-1-55750-442-5
- Gardiner, Robert; Gray, Randal (1985), Conway's All the World's Fighting Ships 1906–1921, Volume 2, Annapolis, Maryland: Naval Institute Press, ISBN 978-0-87021-907-8
- Johnson, E. R. (2011), United States Naval Aviation, 1919-1941: Aircraft, Airships and Ships Between the Wars, Jefferson, North Carolina: McFarland & Company, ISBN 978-0786445509
