= Henry D. Cooke (admiral) =

United States Navy Rear admiral

Henry David Cooke, Jr.
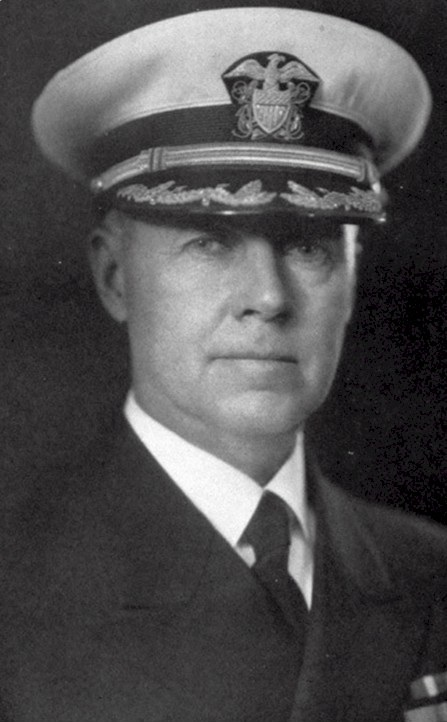
- RADM Henry D. Cooke Jr., USN
- Born: September 21, 1879; Washington, D.C., U.S.
- Died: July 7, 1958 (aged 78); East Hills, New York, U.S.
- Relatives: Henry D. Cooke (grandfather)
- Military career
- Allegiance: United States of America
- Branch: United States Navy
- Service years: 1903–1945
- Rank: Rear admiral
- Commands: Convoy commodore Commandant of midshipmen USS Oklahoma; USS Melville; USS Brazos; USS Billingsley; USS Allen
- Conflicts: Philippine–American War; Occupation of Veracuz; World War I: Battle of the Atlantic; World War II: Atlantic convoy duty
- Awards: Navy Cross; Bronze Star Medal; Purple Heart

Henry David Cooke Jr. (September 21, 1879 – July 7, 1958) was a highly decorated officer in the United States Navy with the rank of rear admiral. A graduate of the United States Naval Academy and veteran of several conflicts, he was wounded during the Philippine–American War and later distinguished himself as Commanding officer of destroyer USS Allen during World War I for which received the Navy Cross, the second highest decoration of the United States military awarded for valor.

Cooke remained in the Navy during the interwar period and served as Commandant of midshipmen at the Naval Academy and Commanding officer of battleship USS Oklahoma. He retired from active duty in early 1940s, but was immediately recalled and served as Convoy commodore in Atlantic during World War II. He was a grandson of Henry D. Cooke, First Governor of the District of Columbia.

== Early career ==
Henry D. Cooke Jr. was born on September 21, 1879, in Washington, D.C. as the son of banker Henry David Sr. and his wife Anna Howell. Cooke attended the public schools in Washington, D.C. and New York City and received an appointment to the United States Naval Academy at Annapolis, Maryland, in September 1899. While at the academy, he was nicknamed "Cookie" by his classmates and was elected President of the Class. Cooke also reached the rank of Cadet Junior Lieutenant.

Cooke graduated as Passed midshipman with Bachelor of Science degree in June 1903 and was assigned to the battleship Wisconsin operating with the Asiatic Fleet mostly in South China Sea during the ongoing Philippine–American War. He was subsequently transferred to the USS Pampanga, schooner-rigged iron gunboat, which was originally a ship of the Spanish Navy, captured by U.S. Army in June 1898. Cooke participated aboard USS Pampanga in patrol duty around Island of Jolo and was wounded by Moro Rebels in 1904 for which he was later decorated with Purple Heart.

Following his recovery, he was transferred to the staff of Army Major general Leonard Wood, governor of Moro Province and also recommended for advancement of ten numbers in grade by the Commander-in-Chief, Asiatic Fleet, Rear admiral Yates Stirling. Cooke was commissioned an Ensign on February 3, 1905 after completing two years at sea then required by law.

He subsequently returned to the United States and entered the instruction in Ordnance at Washington Navy Yard, which he completed several months later. Cooke was assigned to the recently commissioned battleship Virginia in October 1907 and participated in the cruise around the World with Great White Fleet. He visited Port of Spain; Rio de Janeiro, Brazil; Punta Arenas and Valparaíso, Chile; Hawaii; Melbourne and Sydney, Australia; Auckland, New Zealand; Manila, Philippines; Yokohama, Japan; Singapore; Colombo, Ceylon; Suez Canal; Port Said, Egypt; and Gibraltar. While aboard Virginia, he was promoted to Lieutenant on February 3, 1908.

In October 1909, Cooke was ordered back to the United States Naval Academy at Annapolis, Maryland and assumed duty as an instructor in the Department of Physics and Chemistry and Electrical Engineering. He remained in that capacity until June 1912, when he was transferred to the battleship Georgia operating with the Atlantic Fleet. Cooke served as ships's Engineer officer under Captain Robert Coontz, future Chief of Naval Operations and took part in patrol duty in the Mexican waters during the Mexican Revolution.

== World War I ==
Cooke was given his first own sea command by the end of October 1914, when he was appointed Commanding officer of destroyer USS Henley, which conducted neutrality patrols along the coast of Europe during the ongoing World War I. He remained in command of Henley until July 1915, when he was ordered to the Naval War College in Newport, Rhode Island for senior course, which he completed one year later and was promoted to lieutenant commander on August 29, 1916.

Following the United States entry into World War I in April 1917, he was subsequently ordered to the Industrial Department of the New York Navy Yard for duty in connection with fitting out of an armed yacht Kanawha, which was acquired by the United States Navy. Cooke took his ship to Brest, France in mid-June and conducted patrols until August that year, when assumed command of destroyer Jenkins based at Queenstown, Ireland. Jenkins took part in the patrols in the eastern Atlantic, escorting convoys and rescuing survivors of sunken merchantmen.

Cooke was promoted to the temporary rank of Commander in October 1917 and given command of destroyer USS Allen, which was tasked with protection of convoys of troops and cargo ships through the area of submarine activity. Allen and the convoy of allied transports came in contact with enemy U-Boots on March 11 and 16 March 1918, but Cooke maneuvered them off and escorted his ships to safety. He was subsequently decorated with Navy Cross, the second highest decoration of the United States military awarded for valor.

He was later appointed acting commander of the Naval Air Station Lough Foyle, Ireland and returned to the United States in late 1918. Cooke was also decorated with the Legion of Honour, rank of Chevalier by the Government of France.

== Interwar period ==
Cooke was ordered to the Union Iron Works in San Francisco, California for duty in connection with fitting out of destroyer Harding, which was commissioned by the end of January 1919 and Cooke assumed command. He was given additional duty as Commander, Destroyer Division Eight, Atlantic Fleet and later transferred to command of Destroy Division Twenty-seven.

In December 1919, Cooke was ordered to Bethlehem Steel Corporation in Squantum, Massachusetts for duty in connection with fitting out of destroyer Billingsley, which was commissioned on March 1, 1920. Cooke assumed her command and also served simultaneously as Commander, Destroyer Division Fifty conducting operations along the East coast and in the Caribbean until the summer of 1920 when she made Naval Reserve training cruises.

Cooke was ordered to New York City in October 1920 for duty as Officer-in-Charge of Navy Recruiting Officer, an assignment he held until September 1921, when he began his second tour at the United States Naval Academy. He served as Head of the Department of Electrical Engineering and Physics until June 1923, when was assigned to the battleship Wyoming as an Executive officer under Captain George W. Laws. Wyoming served as the flagship of Admiral Hilary P. Jones, the commander of the Atlantic Fleet. Cooke served briefly in this capacity, before assumed command of fleet oiler Brazos.

In May 1925, Cooke was transferred to Boston Navy Yard as Assistant Commandant and Chief of Staff under Rear admiral Philip Andrews, who also served as Commandant, First Naval District. While in this capacity, he was promoted to Captain on November 16, 1925. Cooke remained in that assignment until February 1928, when he assumed command of destroyer tender Melville operating with the Battle Fleet.

Cooke began his third tour at the United States Naval Academy at Annapolis, Maryland in January 1930 and assumed duty as Commandant of midshipmen and director of athletics. While in this capacities, he was responsible for the professional development and day-to-day activities of all 4,500 Midshipmen in the Brigade.

By the end of June 1932, Cooke assumed command of the battleship Oklahoma, which operated along the West Coast of the United States and Hawaii as the part of the Pacific Fleet. Detached in May 1934, Cooke was then ordered to the staff of the President of the Naval War College, Rear admiral Edward C. Kalbfus.

His final assignment came in June 1939, when he was transferred to Boston Navy Yard for duty as a Captain of the Yard. Cooke retired from active duty in June 1939 after 36 years of commissioned service and was advanced to the rank of rear admiral on the retired list for having been specially commended in combat.

== World War II ==
Cooke did not remained in retirement for long and was recalled to the active duty on the next day. He was assigned to the office of the Chief of Naval Operations under his Academy classmate, Admiral Harold R. Stark and later transferred to the Office of the Director of Convoy and Routing under another classmate, Rear admiral Martin K. Metcalf. Cooke assumed duty as a convoy commodore and his main responsibility was command and control of important sea convoys of military personnel and supplies vital to the maintenance of the Allied forces overseas.

He commanded transports which carried several hundred Sherman tanks, which were delivered to Alexandria, Egypt to reinforce Field Marshall Bernard L. Montgomery's Eighth Army. His ships also transported supplies and personnel to Cape Town, South Africa, and was also in the close contact with the merchant service and other Allied naval units and participated in the improvement of the convoy system. Cooke remained in that capacity for the rest of the war and was decorated with the Bronze Star Medal with Combat "V" for his wartime service.

== Postwar life ==
Cooke was relieved of all active duty during the second half of 1945 and joined his wife Elinor Talbot Cooke (1887–1971) at their residence at Long Island, New York City. Cooke died on July 7, 1958, at the age of 78 in East Hills, New York, and is buried together with his wife at Arlington National Cemetery, Virginia.

== Decorations ==
Cooke´s ribbon bar:

1st Row	Navy Cross		Bronze Star Medal with Combat "V"
2nd Row	Purple Heart	Philippine Campaign Medal	Mexican Service Medal
3rd Row	World War I Victory Medal with "Destroyer" clasp	American Defense Service Medal	American Campaign Medal
4th Row	European-African-Middle Eastern Campaign Medal with two service stars	World War II Victory Medal	Chevalier of the Legion of Honour (France)

== See also ==
- USS Oklahoma

Military offices
Preceded by Charles P. Snyder	Commandant of midshipmen 1931–1932	Succeeded by Ralston S. Holmes
