= USS Billingsley =

Clemson-class destroyer

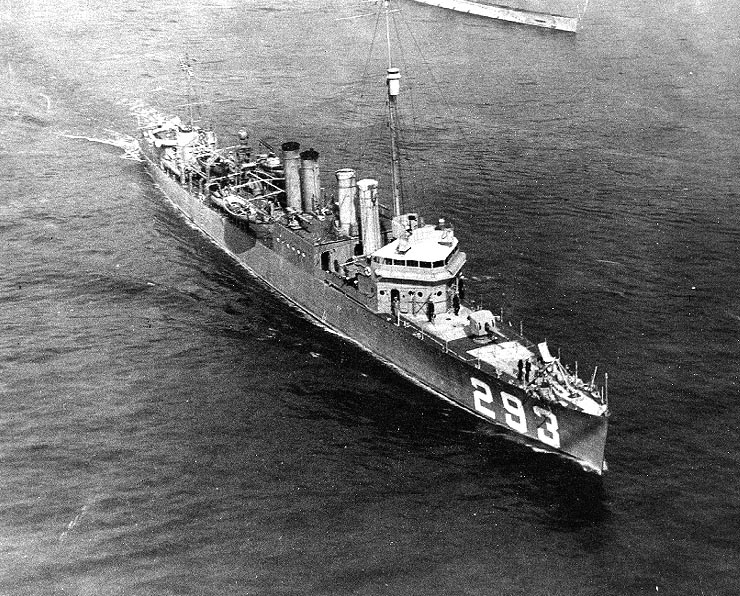
- USS Billingsley

History

United States
- Namesake: William Billingsley
- Builder: Bethlehem Shipbuilding Corporation, Squantum Victory Yard
- Cost: $1,218,366 (hull and machinery)
- Laid down: 8 September 1919
- Launched: 10 December 1919
- Commissioned: 1 March 1920
- Decommissioned: 1 May 1930
- Stricken: 22 October 1930
- Fate: Sold for scrapping, 17 January 1931

General characteristics
- Class & type: Clemson-class destroyer
- Displacement: 1,290 long tons (1,311 t) (standard); 1,389 long tons (1,411 t) (deep load)
- Length: 314 ft 4 in (95.8 m)
- Beam: 30 ft 11 in (9.42 m)
- Draught: 10 ft 3 in (3.1 m)
- Installed power: 27,000 shp (20,000 kW); 4 water-tube boilers
- Propulsion: 2 shafts, 2 steam turbines
- Speed: 35 knots (65 km/h; 40 mph) (design)
- Range: 2,500 nautical miles (4,600 km; 2,900 mi) at 20 knots (37 km/h; 23 mph) (design)
- Complement: 6 officers, 108 enlisted men
- Armament: 4 × single 4-inch (102 mm) guns; 2 × single 1-pounder AA guns or; 2 × single 3-inch (76 mm) guns; 4 × triple 21 inch (533 mm) torpedo tubes; 2 × depth charge rails

USS Billingsley (DD-293) was a Clemson-class destroyer built for the United States Navy during World War I.

== Namesake ==
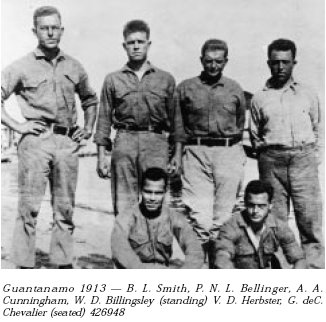
William Billingsley at Guantánamo Bay in 1913

William Devotie Billingsley was born on 24 April 1887 in Winona, Mississippi. He graduated from the United States Naval Academy in 1909. On 2 December 1912, he reported for duty at the Aviation Camp, Annapolis, Maryland, and was assigned to the Navy-Wright B-2 for instruction. Ensign Billingsley, designated as Naval Aviator No. 9, was the first naval aviator killed in an airplane crash. On 10 June 1913, while piloting the B-2 at 1,600 feet (490 m) over water near Annapolis, he was thrown from the plane and fell to his death. John Henry Towers, also unseated in the turbulence, was nearly killed in the same accident as he clung to the plane and fell with it into the water.

== Description ==
The Clemson class was a repeat of the preceding Wickes class although more fuel capacity was added. The ships displaced 1,290 long tons (1,311 t) at standard load and 1,389 long tons (1,411 t) at deep load. They had an overall length of 314 feet 4 inches (95.8 m), a beam of 30 feet 11 inches (9.4 m) and a draught of 10 feet 3 inches (3.1 m). They had a crew of 6 officers and 108 enlisted men.

Performance differed radically between the ships of the class, often due to poor workmanship. The Clemson class was powered by two steam turbines, each driving one propeller shaft, using steam provided by four water-tube boilers. The turbines were designed to produce a total of 27,000 shaft horsepower (20,000 kW) intended to reach a speed of 35 knots (65 km/h; 40 mph). The ships carried a maximum of 371 long tons (377 t) of fuel oil which was intended gave them a range of 2,500 nautical miles (4,600 km; 2,900 mi) at 20 knots (37 km/h; 23 mph).

The ships were armed with four 4-inch (102 mm) guns in single mounts and were fitted with two 1-pounder guns for anti-aircraft defense. In many ships a shortage of 1-pounders caused them to be replaced by 3-inch (76 mm) guns. Their primary weapon, though, was their torpedo battery of a dozen 21 inch (533 mm) torpedo tubes in four triple mounts. They also carried a pair of depth charge rails. A "Y-gun" depth charge thrower was added to many ships.

== Construction and career ==
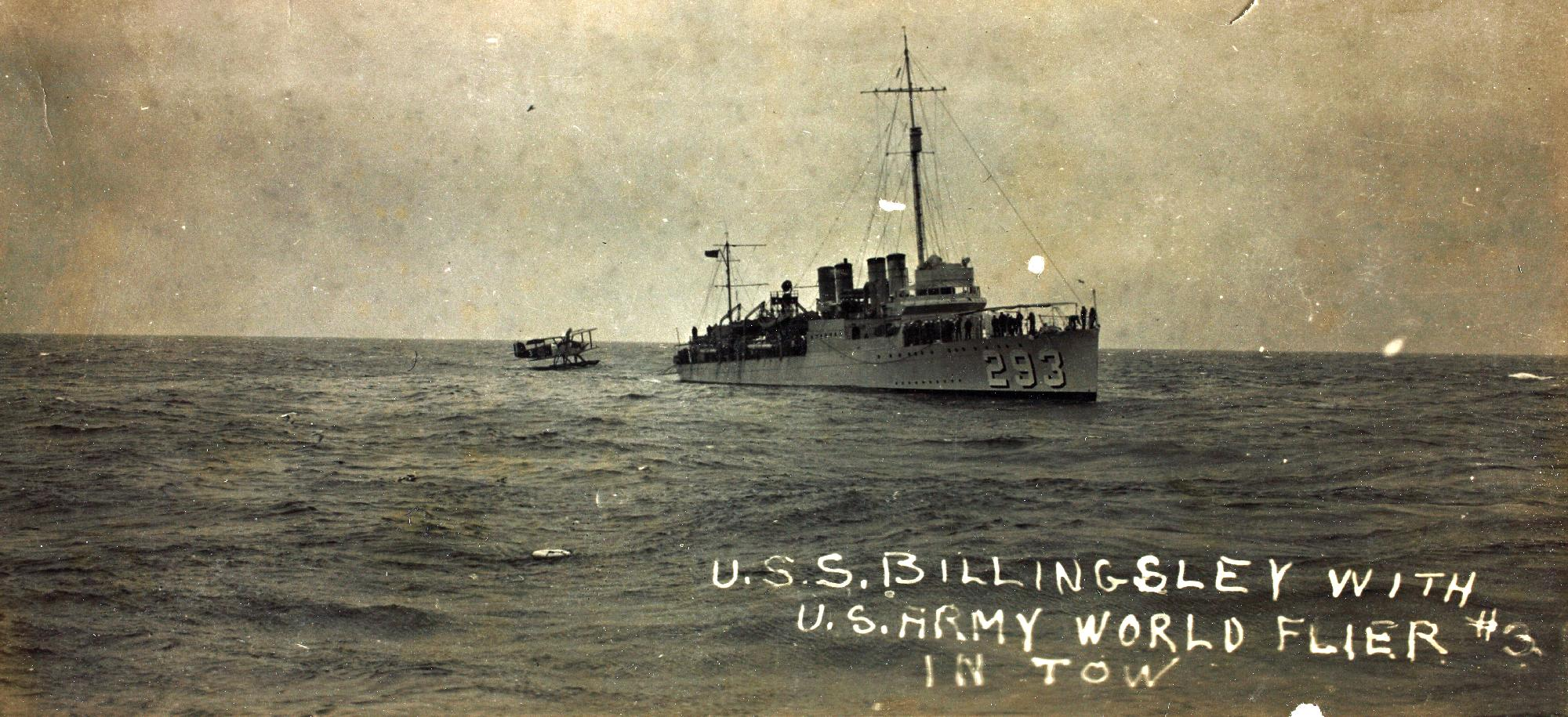
Billingsley towing the disabled Douglas World Cruiser Boston, 3 August 1924

Billingsley, named for William Billingsley, one of the first Navy pilots, Naval Aviator No. 9, was launched 10 December 1919 by Bethlehem Steel Corporation, Squantum, Massachusetts; sponsored by Miss Irene Billingsley, sister of Ensign Billingsley; and commissioned 1 March 1920, Commander Henry D. Cooke in command. Billingsley joined Destroyer Force, Atlantic Fleet, in operations along the east coast and in the Caribbean until the summer of 1920 when she made Naval Reserve training cruises. In reserve until June 1922, she then joined Division 26, Squadron 9, Destroyer Force, at Philadelphia. She cruised along the Atlantic coast until June 1924, when Division 26 joined United States Naval Forces Europe. Billingsley cruised in European and Mediterranean waters for the next year and assisted refugees in the Near East. In summer 1924 she acted as plane guard for the North Atlantic crossing of the Army "Around-the-World Flight." Later in the year she returned home and resumed her routine activities along the east coast until the summer of 1929 when she again made Naval Reserve cruises. Billingsley reported to Philadelphia Navy Yard in September 1929; was decommissioned 1 May 1930; and sold 17 January 1931.

As of 2005, no other ship in the United States Navy has been named Billingsley.
