= USS Harding (DD-625) =

Gleaves-class destroyer

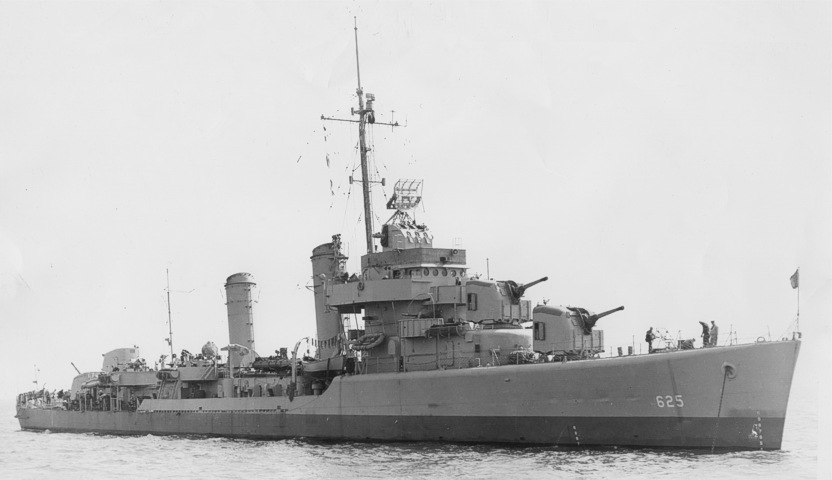
- USS Harding (DD-625) at anchor in October 1943.

History

United States
- Name: Harding
- Namesake: Seth Harding
- Builder: Seattle-Tacoma Shipbuilding Corporation
- Laid down: 22 July 1941
- Launched: 28 June 1942
- Commissioned: 25 May 1943
- Decommissioned: 2 November 1945
- Reclassified: DMS-28, 15 November 1944
- Stricken: 16 November 1945
- Fate: Sold 16 April 1947 and; broken up for scrap

General characteristics
- Class & type: Gleaves-class destroyer
- Displacement: 1,630 tons
- Length: 348 ft 3 in (106.15 m)
- Beam: 36 ft 1 in (11.00 m)
- Draft: 11 ft 10 in (3.61 m)
- Propulsion: 50,000 shp (37,000 kW); 4 boilers; 2 propellers
- Speed: 37.4 knots (69 km/h)
- Range: 6,500 nmi (12,000 km; 7,500 mi) at 12 kn (22 km/h; 14 mph)
- Complement: 16 officers, 260 enlisted
- Armament: 4 × 5 in (127 mm)/38 caliber dual purpose guns (4×1), 6 × 0.50 in (12.7 mm) machine guns, 4 × Bofors 40 mm guns (2×2), 7 × Oerlikon 20 mm cannons (7×1), 5 × 21 in (533 mm) torpedo tubes (5 Mark 15 torpedoes), 6 × depth charge projectors, 2 × depth charge tracks

USS Harding (DD-625) (later DMS-28), a Gleaves-class destroyer, was the second ship of the United States Navy to be named for Seth Harding.

Harding was launched on 28 June 1942 by Seattle-Tacoma Shipbuilding Corp., Seattle, Washington, sponsored by Mrs. Sherwood A. Taffinder. The ship was commissioned on 25 May 1943.

== Service history ==
After shakedown out of San Diego, Harding sailed 1 July for Norfolk, via the Panama Canal. Arriving Hampton Roads on 19 July, she trained in Chesapeake Bay and off the East Coast. She joined a convoy at Norfolk on 16 August 1943 and for the next eight months was assigned antisubmarine patrol for merchant convoys in the Atlantic. During this period of guarding the sea Harding made three round trips to Casablanca.

After escorting the battleship Texas on training exercises, Harding sailed 18 April with a convoy for Europe, and began her first great combat operation — the invasion of Normandy. She spent the month of May training with other ships between Plymouth and Clyde. Then, early on 6 June 1944, Harding joined other naval units in the historic assault. Harding was assigned fire support station, and delivered close gunfire support to the troops ashore for the first hours of the landing. Her accurate gunfire destroyed pillboxes and machine gun emplacements, blasting a way for the troops.

Harding also sent a boat ashore at Pointe du Hoc to take supplies to the Rangers and bring out prisoners and wounded. She continued operations in the assault area until 16 July, protecting against air attack and assisting several transports in distress.

Shifting her operations to the Mediterranean, Harding sailed on 1 August for Oran, Algeria, and from there proceeded to the southern France assault area, as a screening ship. She sailed almost immediately to Corsica, later returning to take up patrol station outside the assault area in southern France. On the night of 17 August, she detected a downed German plane, and after recovering bodies, proceeded to investigate an unidentified contact. As Harding's signalman sought to illuminate the stranger, a burst of machine-gun fire extinguished the light and revealed the presence of four E-boats.

In company with three other destroyers, Harding began a running, twisting battle with the four boats, illuminated by star shell fire, and despite their superior maneuverability, all four were sunk, three by Harding. She brought survivors ashore and resumed her patrol until 24 August.

Harding joined a convoy of LCIs en route to Oran, Algeria on 24 August, returned to southern France until 6 September, and sailed for New York on 25 September 1944. Arriving New York on 3 October, she proceeded to Boston for conversion to a destroyer minesweeper; she was reclassified DMS-28 on 15 November. Emerging on 1 December for her trials, Harding underwent training until 30 December and sailed for the Pacific. She arrived San Diego via the Panama Canal Zone on 15 January 1945, and continued her training in minesweeping techniques.

Sailing on 10 February via Pearl Harbor, Harding arrived at Ulithi on 9 March to prepare for the invasion of Okinawa, the last and largest of the giant Pacific amphibious assaults. She departed for Okinawa on 19 March and began her minesweeping operations in the surrounding areas on 24 March. During the initial landings on 1 April 1945 Harding served as an outer screening ship, and continued this dangerous duty during the savage air attacks which followed. After a near miss by a horizontal bomber during the first heavy raids of 6 April, Harding was assigned to provide fire support to forces ashore the night of 8 April. She returned to screening duties the next day, and on 16 April was attacked with other ships by four kamikazes. One was driven off, another shot down, but a third steered directly for Harding's bridge. As gunfire ripped into her, the aircraft splashed close aboard to starboard, tearing a huge gash in Harding's side from keel to main deck when her bomb exploded.

The stricken ship backed toward Kerama Retto, counting 14 men killed, 8 missing, and 9 wounded. She repaired at Okinawa, and arrived back at Pearl Harbor on 22 August via Saipan.

From Hawaii, Harding transited the Panama Canal via San Diego and arrived at Norfolk on 17 September. She decommissioned on 2 November 1945, and was sold for scrap on 16 April 1947 to Luia Brothers Co., Inc., of Philadelphia.

== Awards ==
Harding received three battle stars for World War II service.
