= Howard H. J. Benson =

United States Navy commodore

Howard Hartwell James Benson
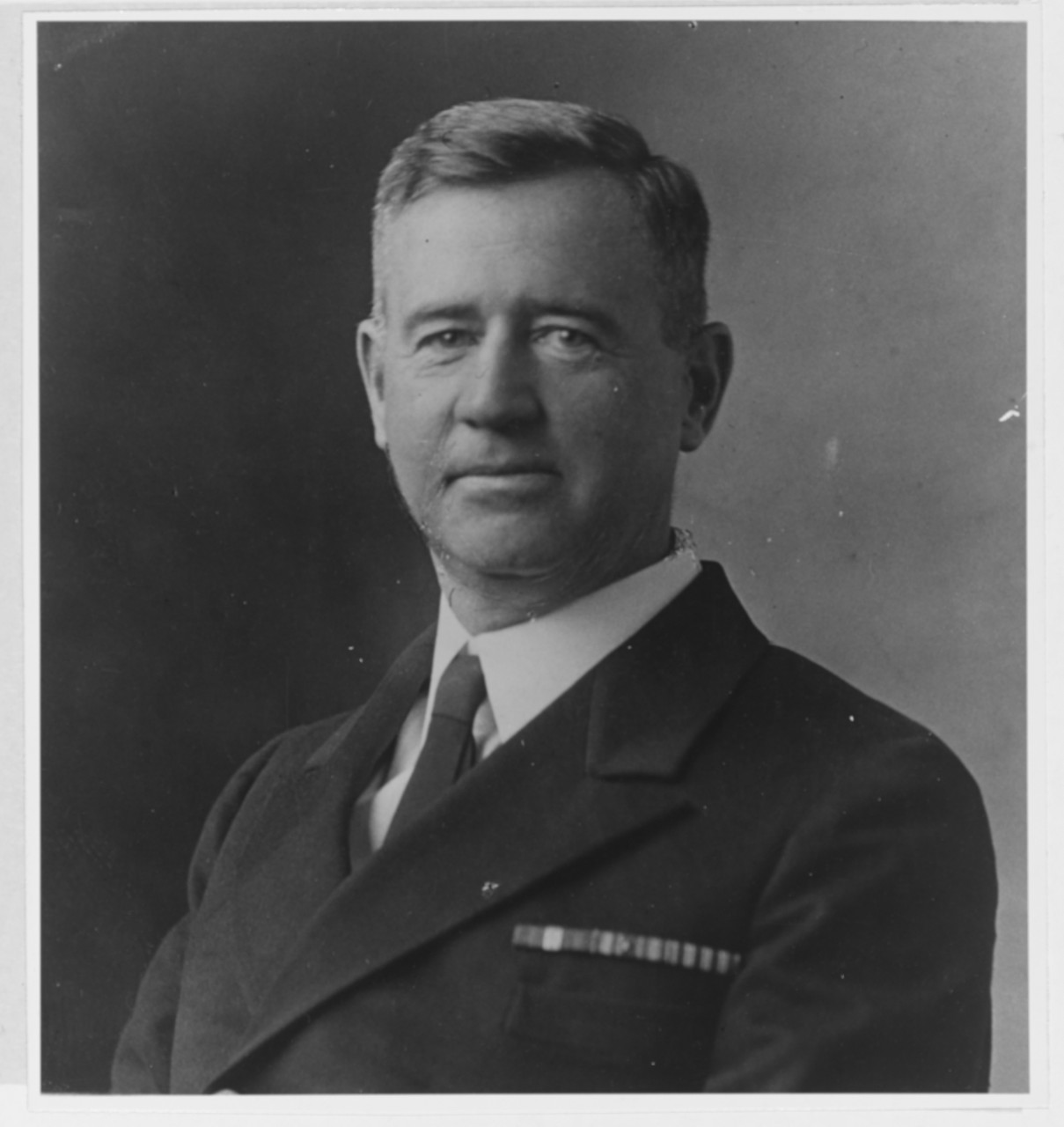
- Commodore Howard H. J. Benson, USN
- Born: October 8, 1888; Baltimore, Maryland, US
- Died: January 28, 1975 (aged 86); Greenbelt, Maryland, US
- Burial place: Arlington National Cemetery
- Relatives: ADM William S. Benson (father)
- Military career
- Allegiance: United States
- Branch: United States Navy
- Service years: 1909–1946
- Rank: Commodore
- Commands: Gulf Sea Frontier; USS Washington; USS Tennessee; USS Holland
- Conflicts: World War I Nicaraguan Campaign; World War II: Battle of the Atlantic
- Awards: Navy Cross; Legion of Merit

Howard Hartwell James Benson (October 8, 1888 – January 28, 1975) was a highly decorated officer in the United States Navy with the rank of Commodore. A son of Chief of Naval Operations, Admiral William S. Benson, he distinguished himself as commanding officer of the destroyer USS Roe during World War I and received the Navy Cross, the U.S. Navy's second-highest decoration awarded for valor in combat.

Benson remained in the Navy during the interwar period and rose to the rank of captain. He commanded the battleship USS Washington during the patrols in the Atlantic in the early stage of World War II. He was later promoted to commodore and transferred to the headquarters Gulf Sea Frontier, where he served as Chief of Staff for the remainder of the war.

== Early career ==
Howard H. J. Benson was born on October 8, 1888, in Baltimore, Maryland, the son of future four-star Admiral William S. Benson and Mary Augusta Wyse. He graduated from the local high school in May 1905 and then received an appointment to the U.S. Naval Academy in Annapolis, Maryland. While at the academy, Benson was active in football and also held a title in the Interclass Sailing Championship. He was nicknamed "Benny" by his classmates.

Among his classmates were several future distinguished flag officers including four-star admirals Alan G. Kirk, Jesse B. Oldendorf; vice admirals Alva D. Bernhard, Olaf M. Hustvedt, William W. Smith, Theodore S. Wilkinson; rear admirals Joel W. Bunkley, Vance D. Chapline, Freeland A. Daubin, Monroe Kelly, Sherman S. Kennedy, Benjamin V. McCandlish, Stewart A. Manahan, Francis W. Scanland, Harold C. Train, and Clifford E. Van Hook.

Benson graduated as passed midshipman with a Bachelor of Science degree on June 4, 1909, and was assigned to the battleship USS Vermont under the command of Medal of Honor recipient, Captain Frank F. Fletcher. He then participated in the Atlantic Fleet maneuvers and gunnery training off the Virginia Capes and another exercise off Guantánamo Bay, Cuba. The Vermont then crossed the Atlantic and visited several western European ports including Gravesend, England and Brest, France. Upon his return stateside in early 1911, Benson was commissioned ensign on June 5, after serving two years at sea, then required by law.

Benson was detached from Vermont in April 1912 and transferred to the submarine tender USS Castine, operating with the American Submarine Flotilla along the U.S. East Coast. While aboard Castine, Benson completed instruction in submarines and qualified as submarine commander. He was subsequently ordered to the Union Iron Works in San Francisco, California for duty in connection with fitting out of the new submarine USS H-2, and following her commissioning on December 1, 1913, Benson assumed duty as her commanding officer. He then conducted patrols near San Pedro, California and was promoted to lieutenant (junior grade) on June 5, 1914.

== World War I ==
In December 1915, Benson was detached from his command and ordered for temporary duty to the Washington Navy Yard, where he remained until March of the following year. He was subsequently ordered to the Bureau of Engineering, where he served under Rear Admiral Richard S. Griffin until July 1917. Meanwhile, the United States declared war on Germany and Benson, eager to see combat in Europe, approached his father, who was now a four-star admiral and Chief of Naval Operations. Benson requested the transfer to the war zone, but his father declined to interfere in personnel matters and turned down the request.

Benson was then transferred to Boston Navy Yard for duty in connection with fitting out certain steam fishing vessels for distant patrol duty. He was promoted to the rank of lieutenant on June 5, 1917, and finally received orders for combat assignment in August that year. He was ordered to France and assumed command of the destroyer USS Roe, which he led during anti-submarine patrols and protection of allied convoys in the waters infested by enemy submarines and mines. By the end of August 1918, Benson was transferred to command of the gunboat USS Corona and continued in the patrols. He was promoted to the temporary rank of lieutenant commander on July 1, 1918.

One month later, Benson joined the staff of Commander, Patrol Forces Three as aide to Rear Admiral Samuel Robison and remained in that capacity until the end of the war. For his service as commanding officer of both Roe and Corona, Benson was decorated with the Navy Cross, the U.S. Navy's second-highest decoration awarded for valor in combat.

== Interwar period ==
Benson returned to the United States in January 1919 and was sent to the Bath Iron Works in Bath, Maine for duty in connection with fitting out of the destroyer USS Buchanan, which was commissioned by the end of the month. He subsequently commanded Buchanan in patrol cruises in the Caribbean and later in the Pacific.

In February 1920, Benson was transferred to temporary command of the destroyer USS Yarnall, where he succeeded then-Commander William F. Halsey. He remained in command for one month and then held another temporary command of the destroyer USS Howard at San Diego, California. Benson was ordered back to the Naval Academy at Annapolis in September 1920 and assumed duty as an instructor in the Department of Electrical Engineering and Physics under Commander Burrell C. Allen.

Benson was ordered for sea duty in June 1922 and after brief service on the staff of Destroyer Squadrons, Pacific Fleet, he assumed command of the destroyer USS S. P. Lee. He commanded her during the patrols along the West Coast until October that year, when he was transferred to the battleship USS Tennessee. Benson took part in patrols in the Caribbean, visiting the Panama Canal Zone; Guantánamo Bay, Cuba; and Puerto Rico and served consecutively as ship's First Lieutenant and Navigator until March 1925.

He was transferred to the Hydrographic Office, Bureau of Navigation in Washington, D.C. and remained there until May 1927, when he assumed command of the destroyer USS Sloat. Benson led his vessel to the Caribbean and conducted patrols off the Nicaraguan coast in order to protect lives and property of U.S. citizens and of other foreign nationals during the U.S. occupation of that country. He was promoted to commander on June 2, 1927.

In June 1929, Benson was ordered back to the United States and entered the Senior course at the Naval War College in Newport, Rhode Island. He graduated the following May and returned to the Naval Academy at Annapolis for duty as an instructor in the Department of Navigation under Captain William L. Calhoun. Benson succeeded Calhoun as head of the department in February 1932 and served in that capacity until the end of July that year. While in the latter capacity, the curriculum and organization of the Academy was studied and planned by the Academic Board of which he was a member. The changes recommended included the combination of the Navigation and Seamanship Departments into one department, which was executed the next year. The revision of the navigation text book, Dutton's Navigation and Piloting, was completed by the officers of the department.

Benson returned to duty afloat in July 1932, when he was appointed acting commanding officer of the fleet replenishment oiler USS Sapelo, serving with the Pacific Fleet. One month later, he was transferred to the battleship USS Tennessee, where he had served in 1922–1925, this time serving as ship's executive officer under Captain William Woods Smyth. Benson participated in the patrols along the West Coast and then proceeded to the Caribbean for fleet maneuvers. While there, Captain Smyth suddenly died of infection which spread to the brain and Benson assumed temporary command of the ship.

His command got underway with the U.S. fleet moving to an anchorage near Culebra, Puerto Rico. Maneuvers and fleet exercises were conducted en route. Further drills, exercises and maneuvers were carried out near Culebra and en route north. On arrival at New York in June 1935 the fleet was reviewed by President Franklin D. Roosevelt.

Upon his return, Benson was detached from Tennessee and ordered to the Army War College in Washington, D.C., where he completed instruction one year later and joined the Shore Establishments Division in the Navy Department, which held overall responsibility for the coordination and improvement of the industrial establishment at the Navy Yards. He served under Rear Admiral Henry E. Lackey until June 1936, when he assumed command of the submarine tender USS Holland. He was promoted to captain on November 1, 1937.

Benson returned to Annapolis for third tour in July 1938 and assumed command of USS Reina Mercedes, a station ship at the Naval Academy. He participated in the training of midshipmen until March 1941.

== World War II ==
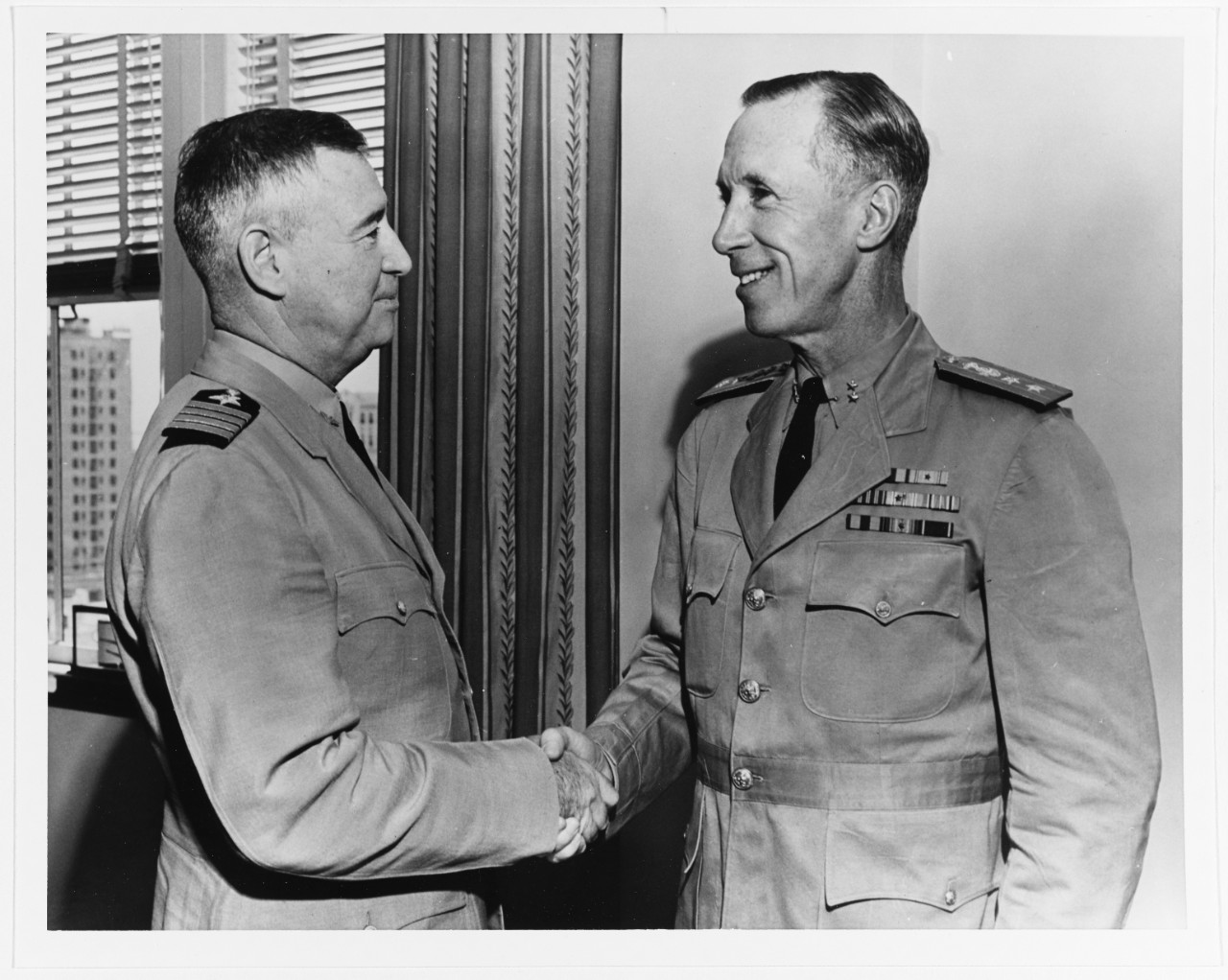
Benson (left) greets new commander of Gulf Sea Frontier, Rear admiral Walter S. Anderson in July 1944.

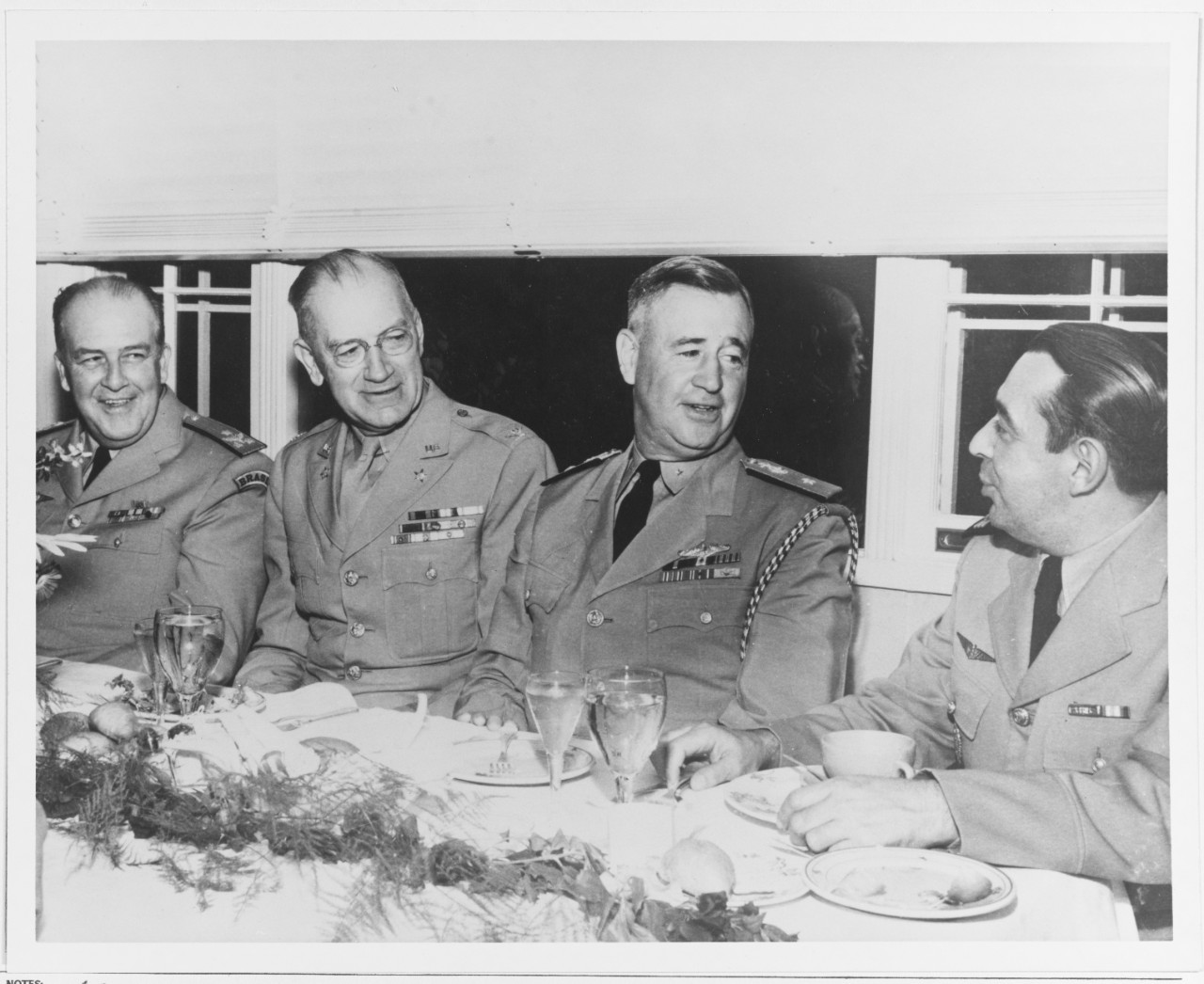
Dinner in honor of General Trompowsky (left), Chief, Brazilian Air Staff. Commodore Benson is in the middle.

Benson was subsequently ordered to the Philadelphia Navy Yard, where he assumed duty in connection with fitting out of the battleship USS Washington. The ship was commissioned two months later and he led her during the patrol cruises to the Atlantic. The Washington later served as a unit of U.S. naval forces in Europe, operating out of Scapa Flow and at sea as a unit of the British Home Fleet guarding convoys between Iceland and Russia against probable attack by the German Battle Force, which included Tirpitz, Lützow, Hipper and Scheer, which were in northern Norwegian ports.

These operations were in the Greenland and Norwegian Seas and the Arctic Ocean, and Benson held command of Washington until July 1942, when he was relieved by Captain Glenn B. Davis. Future Rear Admiral Harvey T. Walsh, who served under Benson's command, described him as "a very pleasant, easygoing, thorough gentleman. But a little old for command of Washington with a stubborn streak with very definite ideas of what and how things should be done."

Benson was subsequently ordered to Miami, Florida, where he assumed duty as Chief of Staff to the Commandant Seventh Naval District and the Commander Gulf Sea Frontier. He served consecutively under Vice Admirals James L. Kauffman, William R. Munroe and Walter S. Anderson and supervised the complex operational and administrative functions of his command during the anti U-boat campaign. Benson also held temporary command of Gulf Sea Frontier during the change of commands periods and was promoted to commodore on November 27, 1944.

He remained in that capacity until November 1, 1946, when he retired from active duty after 37 years of service and received the Legion of Merit for his service. Benson was also decorated with the Order of the Southern Cross by the Government of Brazil and received the Certificate of "Mention in a Despatch" with Oak Leaf Emblem which was conferred on him by the British Government.

== Death ==
Commodore Howard H. J. Benson died on January 28, 1975, aged 86, in Greenbelt, Maryland and was buried with full military honors at Arlington National Cemetery, Virginia. His wife, Elizabeth Rea Thompson (1889–1961) was buried beside him. They had one daughter, Mary Rea Benson Hudson. and a son Howard Hartwell James Benson Jr.

== Decorations ==
Here is his ribbon bar:

Submarine Warfare insignia
1st Row	Navy Cross	Legion of Merit	World War I Victory Medal with Patrol Clasp
2nd Row	Second Nicaraguan Campaign Medal	American Defense Service Medal with "A" Device	European–African–Middle Eastern Campaign Medal with one 3/16 inch service star
3rd Row	American Campaign Medal	World War II Victory Medal	Commander of the Order of the Southern Cross (Brazil)
