= Seth Harding =

Continental Navy officer, sea captain and politician

Seth Harding (April 17, 1734 – November 20, 1814) was a Continental Navy officer, sea captain and politician who served in the American Revolutionary War. In 1776, he was the captain of the Defence.

== Life ==
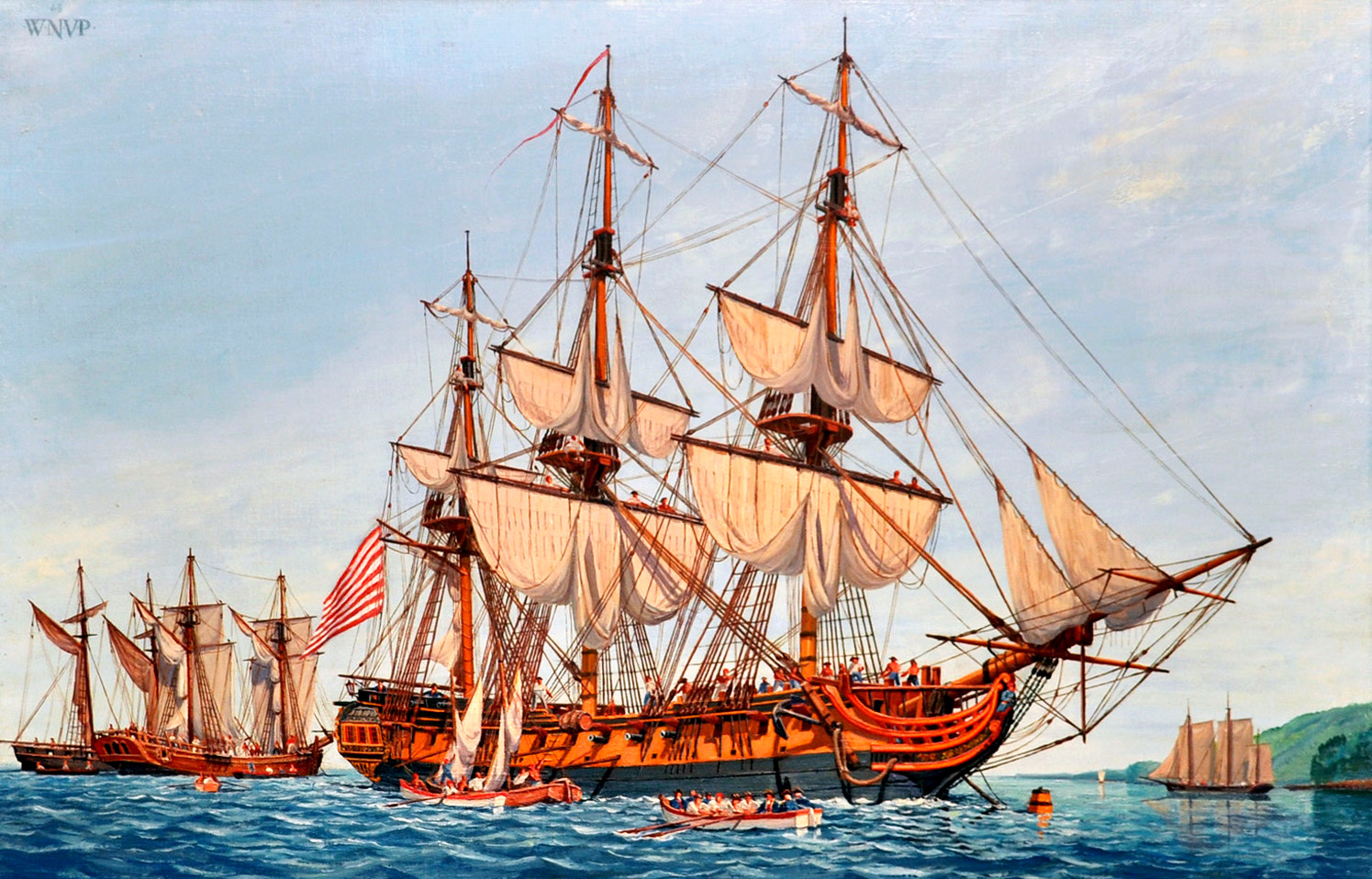
USS Confederacy, Harding's final command

Seth Harding was born in Eastham, Massachusetts on April 17, 1734. He went to sea early in his life and commanded several merchant ships during the French and Indian War. He moved to Liverpool N.S., and briefly served in the 5th General Assembly of Nova Scotia, representing Liverpool Township from Oct. 12, 1773 to 1774.

At the beginning of the American Revolution, he offered his services to Connecticut and was commissioned commander of the state brig Defence. Harding captured many British ships while in command of this and two other vessels. In September 1778, Harding accepted a Continental Navy commission and took command of USS Confederacy. He cruised along the U.S. coast in company with Deane during 1779, taking three prizes and performing convoy duties.

He was ordered to take John Jay, newly appointed minister to Spain, to Europe in September 1779, but the ship was dismasted 10 days out. Harding, through skillful seamanship, sailed his ship to Martinique for repairs, his passengers continuing on another ship. Confederacy raided British merchantmen and guarded convoys until 18 April 1781, when she was forced to surrender to two British ships, Roebuck and Orpheus. Harding was subsequently exchanged, commanded the letter of marque Diana, but was captured again. After this release, the fighting captain volunteered to serve as First Lieutenant to John Barry in Alliance, and was wounded on board during the last engagement of the revolution with HMS Sybil, off Cape Canaveral, Florida.

Harding spent his last years as a merchant sailor and in retirement in Schoharie, New York, where he died.

== Namesake ==
Several ships called USS Harding were named in his honor.
