= USS Allen (DD-66) =

Sampson-class destroyer

History

United States
- Name: USS Allen
- Namesake: Lieutenant William Henry Allen (1784–1813)
- Builder: Bath Iron Works, Bath, Maine
- Laid down: 10 May 1915
- Launched: 5 December 1916
- Commissioned: 24 January 1917; 23 August 1940
- Decommissioned: 22 June 1925; 15 October 1945
- Stricken: 1 November 1945
- Identification: DD-66
- Fate: Sold for scrap 26 September 1946.

General characteristics
- Class & type: Sampson-class destroyer
- Displacement: 1,111 tons (normal), 1,225 tons (full load)
- Length: 315 ft 3 in (96.09 m)
- Beam: 30 ft 7 in (9.32 m)
- Draft: 10 ft 9 in (3.28 m)
- Propulsion: 4 Boilers; 2 Curtis Turbines: 17,696 hp (13,196 kW)
- Speed: 29.5 knots (54.6 km/h)
- Complement: 99 officers and crew
- Sensors & processing systems: Fitted with radar in WW-2, SC and SU type antennas seen mounted on ship by late 1942.
- Armament: 4 × 4-inch (100 mm)/50 guns; 2 × 1-pounder (37 mm) AA guns; 12 × 21 inch (533 mm) torpedo tubes (4 × 3)

USS Allen (DD-66) was a Sampson-class destroyer of the United States Navy launched in 1916. She was the second Navy ship named for Lieutenant William Henry Allen (1784–1813), a naval officer during the War of 1812. She was the longest-serving destroyer on the Naval Vessel Register when she was sold in 1946 and was one of the few US Navy ships completed during World War I to serve in World War II.

== Construction and design ==
The construction of six destroyers of the Sampson-class for the US Navy was authorized in June 1914, with a contract being signed with Bath Iron Works for the construction of USS Allen on 30 January 1915. Allen was laid down by Bath Iron Works at their Bath Maine shipyard and was launched on 5 December 1916, sponsored by Miss Dorothea Dix Allen and Miss Harriet Allen Butler, and commissioned on 24 January 1917, Lieutenant Commander Samuel W. Bryant in command. Final delivery from Bath Iron Works was recorded as 22 October 1917, per the official records of the Bath Iron Works Company. (record Number 68). Construction cost was $816,185.43 for hull and machinery.

Allen was 315 ft 3 in (96.09 m) long overall and 310 ft 0 in (94.49 m) between perpendiculars, with a beam of 30 ft 6 in (9.30 m) and a draft of 10 ft 9 in (3.28 m). Displacement was 920 long tons (935 t) standard and 1,330 long tons (1,350 t) full load. Four Normand three-drum water tube boilers supplied saturated steam at 260 psi (1,800 kPa) to two sets of Parsons steam turbines rated at 17,500 shp (13,000 kW). A geared cruising turbine was fitted which could drive the port propeller shaft. Design speed was 29.5 kn (33.9 mph; 54.6 km/h), with a speed of 30.29 kn (34.86 mph; 56.10 km/h) reached during sea trials.

The ship was armed with four 4-inch (102 mm) 50-calibre guns, with two 1-pounder (37 mm) pom-pom autocannon providing anti-aircraft protection. Four triple mounts for 21-inch (533 mm) torpedo tubes were fitted. Crew was 136 officers and other ranks during wartime and 103 during peacetime.

By 1930, Allen's pom-poms had been replaced by a single 3-inch (76 mm) anti-aircraft gun. Allen was rearmed during World War II for escort operations, with two triple torpedo-tube mounts being removed to accommodate depth charge projectors and six Oerlikon 20 mm cannons.

== Service history ==
=== World War I ===
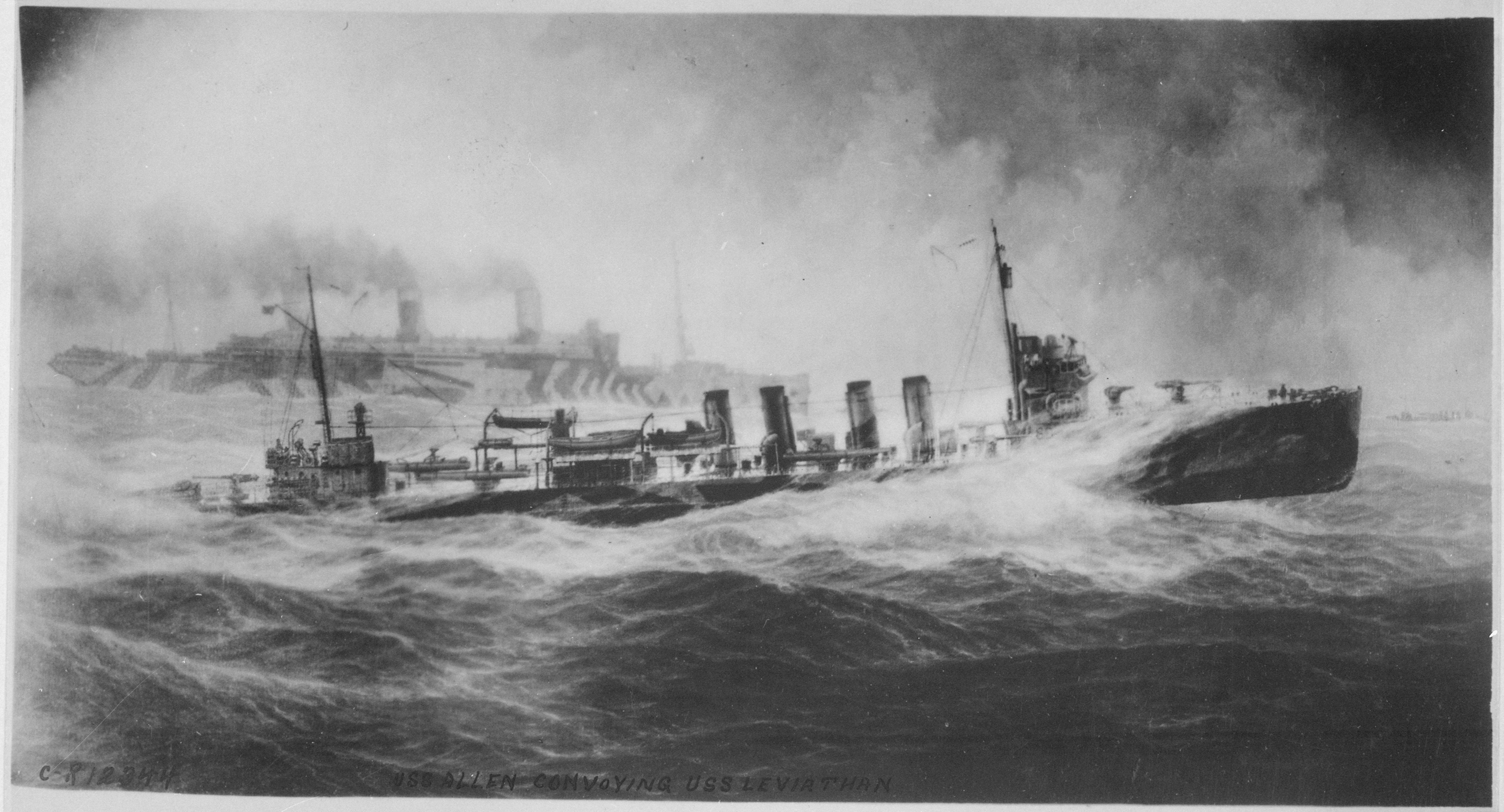
Painting of USS Allen convoying USS Leviathan, ca. 1917 - 1918.

In the five months after commissioning, Allen conducted patrol and escort duty along the eastern seaboard of the US and in the West Indies, continuing these duties following the United States entering World War I on the side of the Allies on 6 April. On the night of 30 April/1 May 1917, Allen was escorting the battleship Connecticut when she collided with the destroyer Duncan, damaging both ships. On 14 June, the destroyer put to sea from New York in the escort of one of the first convoys to take American troops to Europe. After seeing the convoy safely across the Atlantic, Allen joined other American destroyers at Queenstown, Ireland, and began duty patrolling against U-boats and escorting convoys on the last leg of their voyage to Europe under the command of Commander Henry D. Cooke. Cooke was later awarded with the Navy Cross for his leadership of USS Allen.

That duty included escort missions into both French and British ports. During her service at Queenstown, she reported engagements with German submarines on 10 separate occasions, but postwar checks of German records failed to substantiate even the most plausible of the supposed encounters.

On 14 July 1917, Allen was escorting the merchant ships SS Rhesus and SS Idomeneus when Rhesus was missed by a torpedo, possibly from the German submarine U-49 or U-58. One of the last duties the destroyer performed in European waters came in December 1918 when she helped to escort George Washington, with President Woodrow Wilson embarked, into Brest, France, on the 13th. Following that mission, the destroyer returned to Queenstown, whence she departed on the day after Christmas, bound for home. Allen pulled into New York on 7 January 1919.

=== Inter-War Period ===
After voyage repairs, the destroyer resumed duty along the East Coast and in the West Indies with the United States Atlantic Fleet. That duty continued until 22 June 1922, at which time she was placed out of commission, in reserve. She was placed back in commission three years later, on 23 June 1925. Allen spent almost three years as a training platform for naval reservists at Washington, D.C. In March 1928, the destroyer returned to the Reserve Fleet and was berthed at Philadelphia. There, she remained for more than 12 years. On 23 August 1940, Allen was recommissioned at Philadelphia.

=== World War II ===
Following a brief period of service on the United States East Coast, Allen was reassigned to the Pacific Fleet as a unit of Destroyer Division (DesDiv) 80. By the time Allen returned to commission, the Pacific Fleet had been moved from its base on the United States West Coast to Pearl Harbor, Hawaii as a gesture to "restrain" the Japanese. Therefore, Allen moved to the Hawaiian base, whence she operated until the beginning of hostilities between the United States and Japan.

On the morning of 7 December 1941, Allen was moored in East Loch to the northeast of Ford Island and just southeast of the hospital ship USS Solace. During the Japanese attack on the harbor that morning, it was claimed that Allen assisted in downing three enemy planes.

Following the attack, Allen began duty escorting ships between islands of the Hawaiian chain and patrolling the area for enemy ships, primarily submarines. A primary training function of Allen during this period was to work up new submarine crews in penetrating ASW defensive positions, with Allen acting as the defender. This task is recorded in several histories of US submarine operations in the Pacific as their first actual action against a ship. On 4 June 1942, Allen was given orders to escort the submarine USS Nautilus to Midway Island. Upon arriving Allen was put into a defensive role, and provided anti-air defense and screens for other ships and aided in the defense of Midway Island itself. Although Allen did not have a major impact in the Battle of Midway Allen survived the encounter and returned to Pearl Harbor on 6 June. Allen also made periodic round-trip voyages to the United States West Coast. Such duty remained her occupation throughout World War II.

In September 1945, Allen steamed from Hawaii to Philadelphia, where she was placed out of commission on 15 October 1945. Her name was struck from the Navy list on 1 November 1945, and she was sold to the Boston Metals Company, Baltimore, Maryland, on 26 September 1946 for scrapping. Being in service prior to the US entry into World War I, and serving through World War II, Allen was the longest-serving destroyer on the Naval Register when she was sold.

== Awards ==
- World War I Victory Medal with "DESTROYER" clasp
- American Defense Service Medal with "FLEET" clasp
- Asiatic-Pacific Campaign Medal with one battle star
- World War II Victory Medal
