= Bernard F. Roeder =

Bernard Franklin Roeder
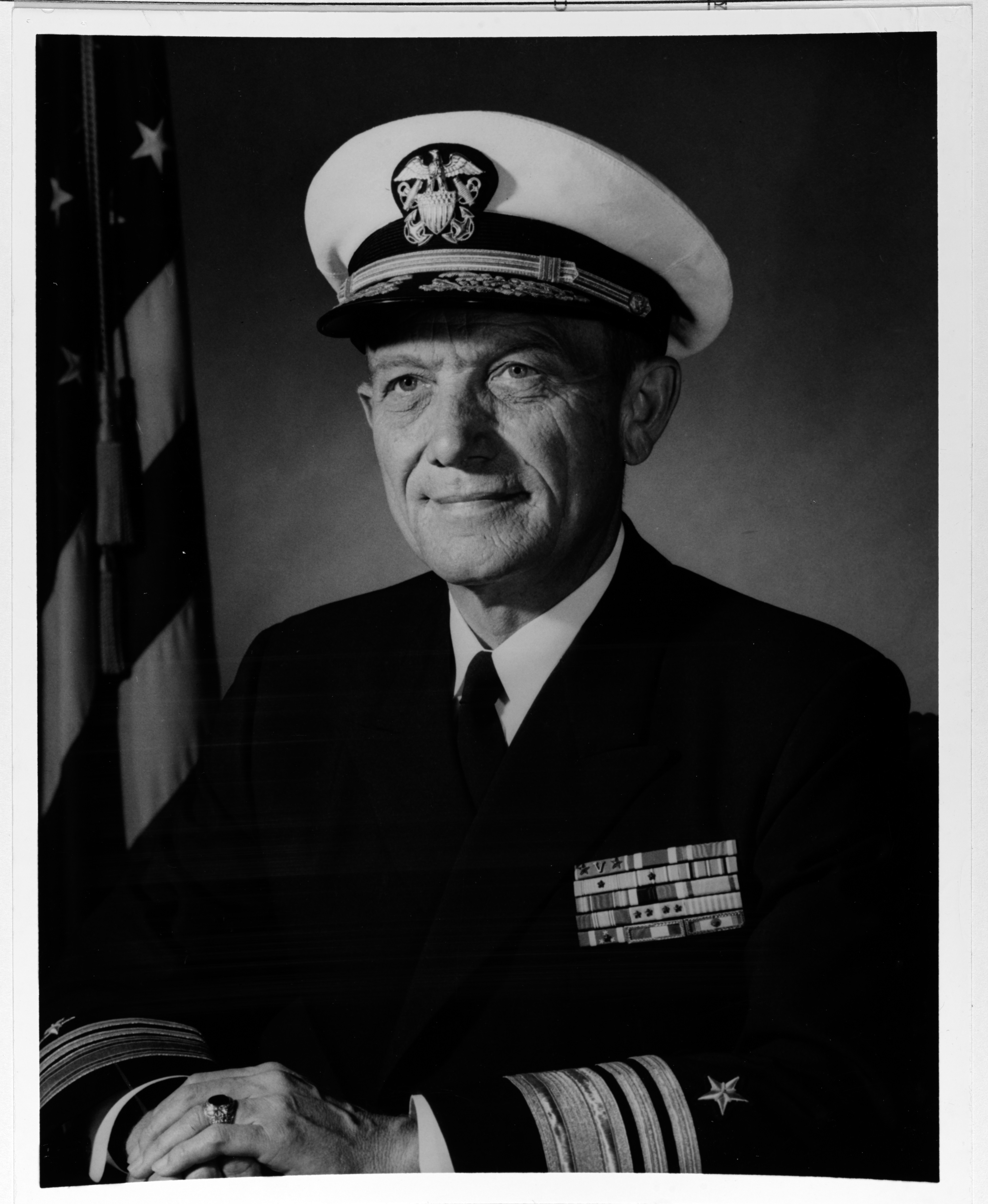
- VADM Bernard F. Roeder, USN
- Born: February 4, 1911; Cumberland, Maryland
- Died: September 3, 1971 (aged 60); San Diego, California
- Military career
- Allegiance: United States of America
- Branch: United States Navy
- Service years: 1931–1969
- Rank: Vice admiral
- Nickname: "Brute"
- Commands: United States First Fleet; ComPhibPac; Director of Naval Communications; Naval Security Group; USS Lowry; USS Collett; USS Pickaway
- Conflicts: World War II: Philippines campaign (1941–1942); Dutch East Indies Campaign; Korean War: Siege of Wonsan
- Awards: Distinguished Service Medal; Legion of Merit (5); Navy Commendation Medal

Bernard Franklin Roeder (February 4, 1911 – September 3, 1971) was a decorated officer in the United States Navy with the rank of vice admiral, who held many important assignments, including commander in chief of United States First Fleet and Director of Naval Communications. He also served as first director of the Naval Security Group.

== Early career ==
Roeder was born on February 4, 1911, in Cumberland, Maryland, as the son of William P. and Anna Roeder and attended the Allegheny High School in his hometown. Following high school, he entered the United States Naval Academy at Annapolis, Maryland, in summer 1927. During his time at the academy, Roeder was active in football, Glee club and tennis and was a member of reception committee. He graduated on June 4, 1931, with a bachelor's degree and was commissioned ensign on the same date.

From August 1931 to June 1937, he had sea duty successively aboard the light cruiser USS Richmond, destroyers USS Gilmer, USS Farragut or aircraft carrier USS Lexington. Roeder was promoted to the rank of lieutenant (junior grade) in summer 1934.

Roeder became first involved with the naval communications in July 1937, when he was ordered to Washington, D.C., and attached to the Office of the Chief of Naval Operations, Communication Division, Navy Department. He was attached to the OP-20-G's cryptology course and upon the completion of the training in July 1938, he was promoted to the rank of lieutenant and appointed officer in charge of section OP-20-G-C (Codes and Ciphers).

== World War II ==
He was transferred to the Philippines in January 1940 and appointed assistant communications officer for the Sixteenth Naval District Cavite under Rear Admiral John M. Smeallie. Roeder served in this capacity until November 1940, when he was attached to the staff of Commander in Chief, United States Asiatic Fleet. Roeder served under Admiral Thomas C. Hart as security and assistant communications officer and was ashore when Japanese attacked the Philippines in December 1941.

He was subsequently transferred to the staff of U.S. Naval Forces, Surabaya, Java, and served as communication officer at ABDA Command headquarters in Lembang until March 1942. Roeder was then transferred to Perth, Australia, as assistant communication officer on the staff of U.S. Naval Forces Australia, before he was appointed to the staff of Commander in Chief, United States Seventh Fleet at Melbourne and Brisbane under vice admiral Arthur S. Carpender. During his service in Australia, Roeder was promoted to the rank of lieutenant commander in June 1942 and to commander in November of that year. He also received Navy Commendation Medal for his service in that capacity.

Roeder was ordered back to the United States in January 1943 and attached back attached to the Communication Division within Office of the Chief of Naval Operations. He served under Rear admiral Joseph Redman until the end of August 1945 and received Legion of Merit for his service in this capacity.

== Postwar career ==
He was ordered back to the Pacific and appointed executive officer of the battleship USS New Jersey, which served as flagship of Commander in Chief of U.S. Fifth Fleet, admiral Raymond A. Spruance and later also of John H. Towers. While aboard that ship, Roeder took part in the support operations regarding the Occupation of Japan and also participated in the Operation Magic Carpet, during which she took aboard nearly a thousand homeward-bound troops with whom she arrived at San Francisco on February 10, 1946.

Roeder relieved commander Edwin S. Miller as commanding officer of destroyer USS Lowry at the beginning of April 1947 and took that ship to Sydney, Australia, for the anniversary of the Battle of the Coral Sea. Returning to San Diego on June 14 and she decommissioned June 30, 1947, and entered the Pacific Reserve Fleet. Roeder then assumed command of destroyer USS Collett and took part in patrol cruise along the West Coast, before he took the ship to Mare Island Naval Shipyard for overhaul in September of that year.

Upon his detachment from Collett in December 1947, Roeder was ordered back to the Communication Division in Washington, D.C., and served under Rear admiral Earl E. Stone until the summer of 1948, when he was sent for instruction to the Naval War College at Newport, Rhode Island. He graduated one year later and also was promoted to the rank of Captain during the same time.

In May 1950, Roeder was ordered to the Far East area and appointed Commander of Destroyer Division 112 and took part in the support operations of UN forces in Korea. He commanded his ships during the shore bombardment of Wonsan in February 1951 and received his second Legion of Merit with Combat "V" for that action. Roeder then participated in the patrol cruises in Formosa Strait in order to prevent Chinese ships sail to Korea and received third Legion of Merit.

He left Far East in July 1951 and assumed duties in Washington, D.C., with the Office of Naval Intelligence. Another tour of sea duties came in July 1953, when he was ordered to the staff of Battleship Cruiser Force, U.S. Atlantic Fleet as operations officer and took part in the Naval Academy's midshipman cruise to Europe. Roeder then served with U.S. Sixth Fleet in the Mediterranean Sea and returned to the United States in December 1954.

In February 1955, Roeder was ordered back to Korea to relieve his classmate, Captain Berton A. Robbins, Jr. as commanding officer of attack transport USS Pickaway. He participated in the naval exercise off the coast of Korea and subsequently took the ship back to the United States. After one year of sea duties along the West Coast, Roeder assumed command of Transport Division 12 in February 1956 and commanded that unit until March 1957, when he was appointed chief of staff of Amphibious Training Command, Pacific Fleet.

Roeder returned to the naval communication in September 1957, when he was ordered back to Washington, D.C., and appointed assistant director of Naval Security Group matters in the Naval Communication Division. He then served as first head of Naval Security Group and was promoted to the rank of rear admiral in March 1959. Roeder was appointed deputy director of naval communications for Naval Security Group and served in that capacity until June 1960, when he was appointed commander of Amphibious Group Three.

He was ordered back to Washington, D.C., in October 1961 and appointed Assistant CNO and Director of Naval Communications. Roeder distinguished himself in this capacity and was recognized as a remarkable proponent of the navy's use of communication satellites, which directly led to the first installation of COMSAT terminals in combatant ships of the fleet. His term as Director of Naval Communications ended in May 1965 and Roeder was decorated with received his fourth Legion of Merit for service in this capacity. He was meanwhile promoted to the rank of vice admiral in March 1965.

Roeder then served as Commander, Amphibious Forces, Pacific Fleet, before assumed duty as commander in chief of U.S. First Fleet. He relieved his classmate, Lawson P. Ramage, in this capacity and was responsible for patrolling of the West Coast of the United States. Roeder retired from the navy after 38 years of active service on October 4, 1969, due to bad health. He was decorated with Navy Distinguished Service Medal for his service with First Fleet.

Vice Admiral Bernard F. Roeder died on the morning of September 3, 1971, in the Naval Hospital, San Diego, California, after suffering a stroke. He was survived by his wife, Kathleen Fitch and their four children.

== Decorations ==
Here is the ribbon bar of Vice Admiral Bernard F. Roeder:

1st Row	Navy Distinguished Service Medal		
2nd Row	Legion of Merit with Combat "V" and four 5/16" Gold Stars	Navy Commendation Medal	Navy Unit Commendation
3rd Row	American Defense Service Medal with Clasp	Asiatic-Pacific Campaign Medal with one 3/16 inch service star	American Campaign Medal
4th Row	World War II Victory Medal	China Service Medal	Navy Occupation Service Medal
5th Row	National Defense Service Medal with one star	Korean Service Medal with four 3/16 inch service stars	United Nations Korea Medal
6th Row	Philippine Defense Medal with one star	Philippine Republic Presidential Unit Citation	Republic of Korea Presidential Unit Citation

== See also ==
- Director of Naval Communications
- Naval Security Group

Military offices
Preceded by Lawson P. Ramage	Commander in Chief, United States First Fleet; July 29, 1966 – September 30, 1969	Succeeded by Isaac C. Kidd Jr.
