= Carleton F. Bryant =

American Navy Vice Admiral

Carleton Fanton Bryant
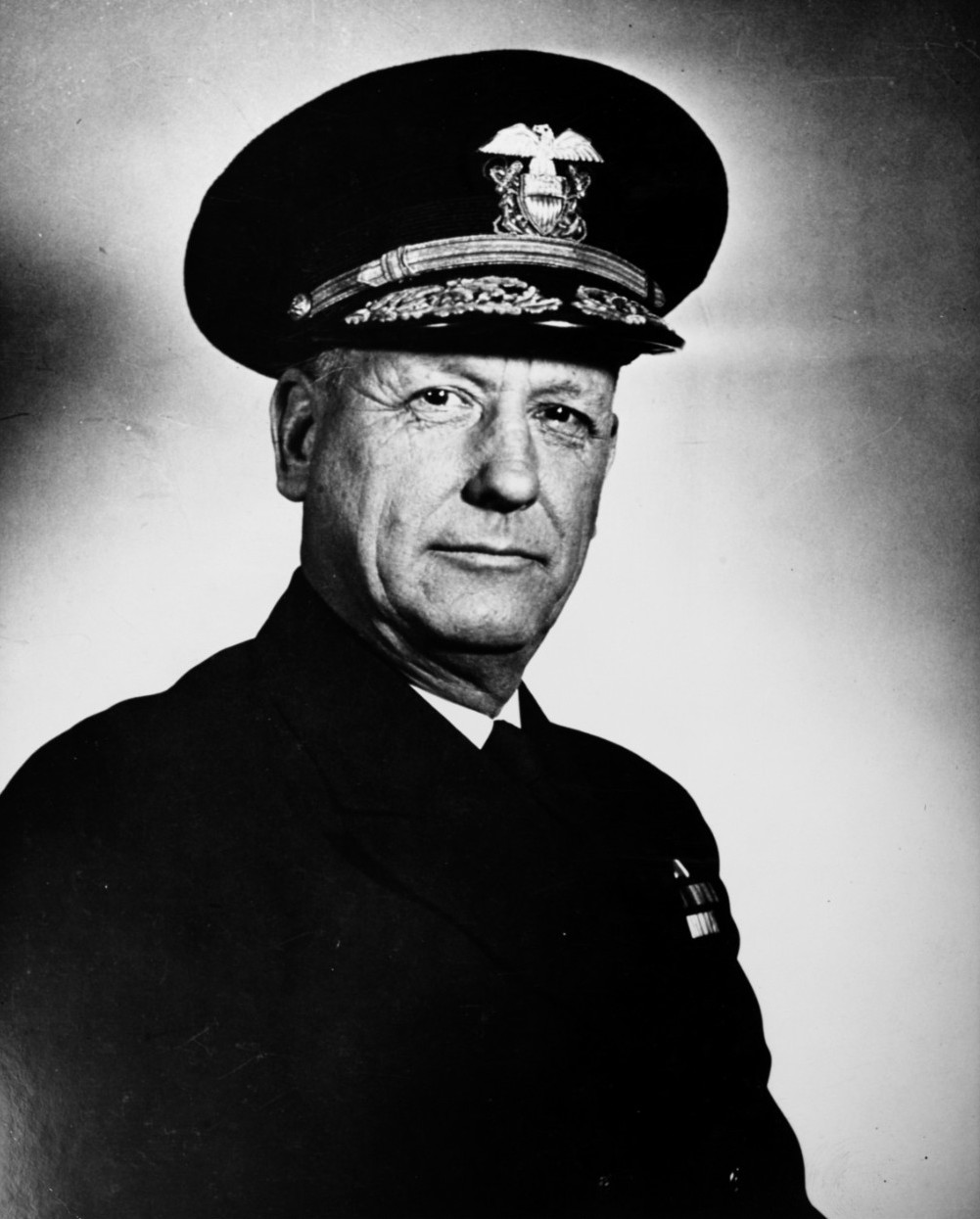
- VADM Carleton F. Bryant, USN
- Born: November 29, 1892; New York City, US
- Died: April 11, 1987 (aged 94); Camden, Maine, US
- Burial place: Searsport Village Cemetery
- Military career
- Allegiance: United States
- Branch: United States Navy
- Service years: 1914–1946
- Rank: Vice Admiral
- Commands: Fleet Operational Training Command, Atlantic Fleet; Battleship Division 5 USS Arkansas; USS Charleston; USS Stewart
- Conflicts: Veracruz Expedition; World War I World War II: Invasion of Iceland; Operation Torch; Battle of the Atlantic; Battle of Normandy; Invasion of Southern France
- Awards: Distinguished Service Medal; Legion of Merit (3)

Carleton Fanton Bryant (November 29, 1892 – April 11, 1987) was a highly decorated officer in the United States Navy with the rank of Vice Admiral. He distinguished himself as Commander of the Gunfire Support Group of the Assault Force "O" during the amphibious invasion of the coast of Normandy, France, on June 6, 1944.

Bryant later led Center Support Group of the Western Naval Task Force during the amphibious invasion of Southern France in August 1944, before returning to the United States for duty as Commander Fleet Operational Training Command, United States Atlantic Fleet.

== Early career ==
Carleton F. Bryant was born on November 29, 1892, in New York City, the son of jeweler William Cullen and Charlotte Fanton Bryant. He grew up in Bangor, Maine, where he graduated from the high school and then earned an appointment to the United States Naval Academy at Annapolis, Maryland, in summer 1910. While at the academy, he was active in the Choir and Crew, where he earned Varsity letter for excellence. Bryant also reached the rank of Cadet Junior Lieutenant and held duty as Adjutant of 1st Cadet Battalion.

Among his classmates were many future admirals during World War II, including John H. Brown Jr., William K. Harrill, Joseph R. Redman, Robert W. Cary Jr., John B. W. Waller, Wilder D. Baker, Richard L. Conolly, Robert W. Hayler, Oliver Kessing, Frank L. Lowe, Edward L. Cochrane, Ralph O. Davis and Edward Ellsberg.

Bryant graduated with Bachelor of Science degree on June 6, 1914, and was commissioned Ensign on that date. He was subsequently assigned to the battleship USS Wyoming and took part in the Veracruz Expedition in autumn 1914. Bryant then participated in the patrol cruises in the Caribbean and following the United States' entry into World War I, he sailed for Europe, where he took part in the naval operations with the British Grand Fleet. He was promoted to Lieutenant (junior grade) on June 6, 1917, and to temporary rank of Lieutenant on August 31 that year.

== Interwar period ==
Following his return to the United States, Bryant was ordered to the Naval Postgraduate School and then Lehigh University in Bethlehem, Pennsylvania, in September 1919 for a postgraduate courses in metallurgy. He graduated with Master of Science degree in October 1920 and was ordered to the Washington Navy Yard for instruction in Ordnance engineering. Bryant was meanwhile promoted to the temporary rank of Lieutenant commander on November 19, 1919, but due to postwar personnel reduction, he was reverted to the peacetime rank of Lieutenant on June 6, 1920.

Bryant was transferred to the battleship USS Pennsylvania in June 1921 and took part in the exercise in the Caribbean. He then spent three years with patrolling of West Coast of the United States and was promoted again to Lieutenant commander on June 5, 1924, and was appointed Assistant Naval Inspector of Ordnance at New York Shipbuilding Corporation at Camden, New Jersey. Carleton was transferred to the Midvale Steel Corporation in Philadelphia in June 1925 and served as Naval Inspector of Ordnance until July 1926, when he was ordered to Camden Shipyard for duty in connection with fitting out of aircraft carrier USS Saratoga.

He then served as Saratoga's gunnery officer under Captain Harry E. Yarnell in the Pacific Ocean until December 1930, when he was ordered to New Haven, Connecticut, for duty as Officer-in-Charge of the Navy Recruiting Station there. While in this capacity, Bryant completed correspondence course in strategy and tactics at the Naval War College. He was ordered back for sea duty in June 1932, when he assumed command of destroyer USS Stewart.

Bryant was promoted to Commander on June 30, 1934, and ordered as Naval Inspector of Ordnance to the Bethlehem Shipbuilding Corporation at Quincy, Massachusetts, in March of the following year. He returned to sea duty in February 1937, when he assumed command of patrol gunboat USS Charleston with whom he later took part in the exercise off the coast of Balboa, Panama.

In March 1939, Bryant was ordered to Washington, D.C., where he joined the Office of Naval Intelligence under Rear admiral Walter S. Anderson. While in this capacity, he was promoted to Captain on July 1, 1940, and assumed duty as assistant director.

== World War II ==
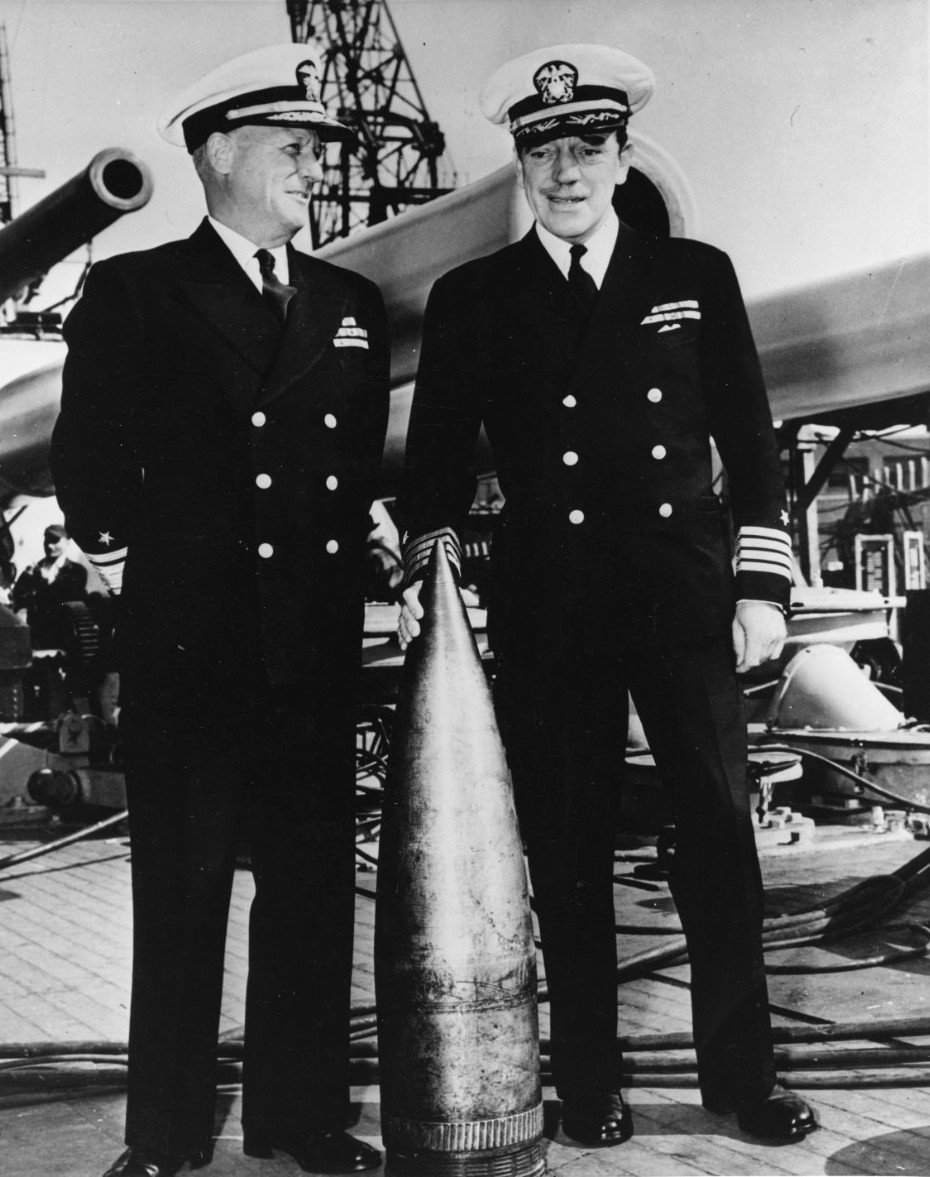
Bryant (left) and Captain Charles A. Baker, Commanding Officer, USS Texas on board Texas with a German 240mm (9.4) dud shell that hit the ship during the bombardment of Battery Hamburg, east of Cherbourg, France, on June 25, 1944.

In April 1941, Bryant assumed command of battleship USS Arkansas and participated in the escort of the Marine Forces to occupy Iceland. Following the United States entry into World War II, Arkansas participated in the convoy duty of troops and supplies to Iceland, United Kingdom and later to Casablanca, Morocco during the invasion of North Africa in late 1942. Bryant transported approximately one million servicemen during this service.

Bryant was promoted to Rear admiral in May 1943 and assumed command of Battleship Division 5, Atlantic Fleet. While in this capacity, he continued in escort of fast troop convoys throughout the enemy waters infested with German U-boats until spring 1944 and received Legion of Merit with Combat "V" for his service.

He then participated in the planning of Operation Overlord, the invasion of German-occupied Western Europe and was tasked with the command of the Gunfire Support Group of the Assault Force "O" during the amphibious invasion of the coast of Normandy, France, on June 6, 1944. His support group consisted of battleships Arkansas and Texas; four light cruiser (two British: Glasgow and Bellona; and two French Montcalm and Georges Leygues); and twelve American and British destroyers and was tasked with support of V Corps under Major general Leonard T. Gerow. Bryant distinguished in this capacity and received his second Legion of Merit and also Distinguished Service Order by British.

Bryant then assumed duty as Commander of the Center Support Group of the Western Naval Task Force during the amphibious invasion of Southern France in August 1944 and his units provided shore bombardment during the assault landings of elements of the U.S. Seventh Army over selected beaches along the Coast of Southern France. For his service in Southern France, Bryant was decorated with third Legion of Merit and also received second Distinguished Service Order. The Government of France bestowed him Legion of Honour and Croix de Guerre.

In September 1944, Bryant returned to the United States and assumed duty as Commander Fleet Operational Training Command, United States Atlantic Fleet with headquarters at Norfolk Navy Yard, Virginia. While in this capacity, Bryant was subordinated to Commander-in-Chief, Atlantic Fleet, Admiral Jonas H. Ingram and was responsible for providing initial training to ships of the Fleet and keeping them abreast of new developments. He excelled in this assignment and received Navy Distinguished Service Medal for his service.

== Retirement ==
Bryant retired from the Navy on May 1, 1946, after 32 years of service and was advanced to the rank of Vice admiral on the retired list for having been specially commended in combat. He then settled in Santa Barbara, California, where he lived for nineteen years, before moved to Camden, Maine.

Vice admiral Carleton F. Bryant died there on April 11, 1987, aged 94 and was buried at Searsport Village Cemetery. His wife, Elizabeth Rattray Bryant is beside him. They had two children: a daughter Elizabeth and a son, Carlton F. Bryant Jr., who also served in the Navy during World War II.

== Awards and decorations ==
Here is the ribbon bar of Vice Admiral Bryant:

Navy Distinguished Service Medal		Legion of Merit with Combat "V" and 2 5/16" Gold Stars
Mexican Service Medal	World War I Victory Medal with 3/16" Fleet Clasp	American Defense Service Medal with "A" Device
American Campaign Medal	European-African-Middle Eastern Campaign Medal with 4 3/16" service stars	World War II Victory Medal
Distinguished Service Order with Bar (United Kingdom)	Officer of the Legion of Honour (France)	French Croix de guerre 1939–1945 with Palm

== See also ==
- Operation Dragoon

Military offices
Preceded by Francis C. Denebrink	Commander, Fleet Operational Training Command, Atlantic Fleet; November 1944 – January 1946	Succeeded by Carl F. Holden
