= Oliver Kessing =

American rear admiral

Oliver Owen Kessing
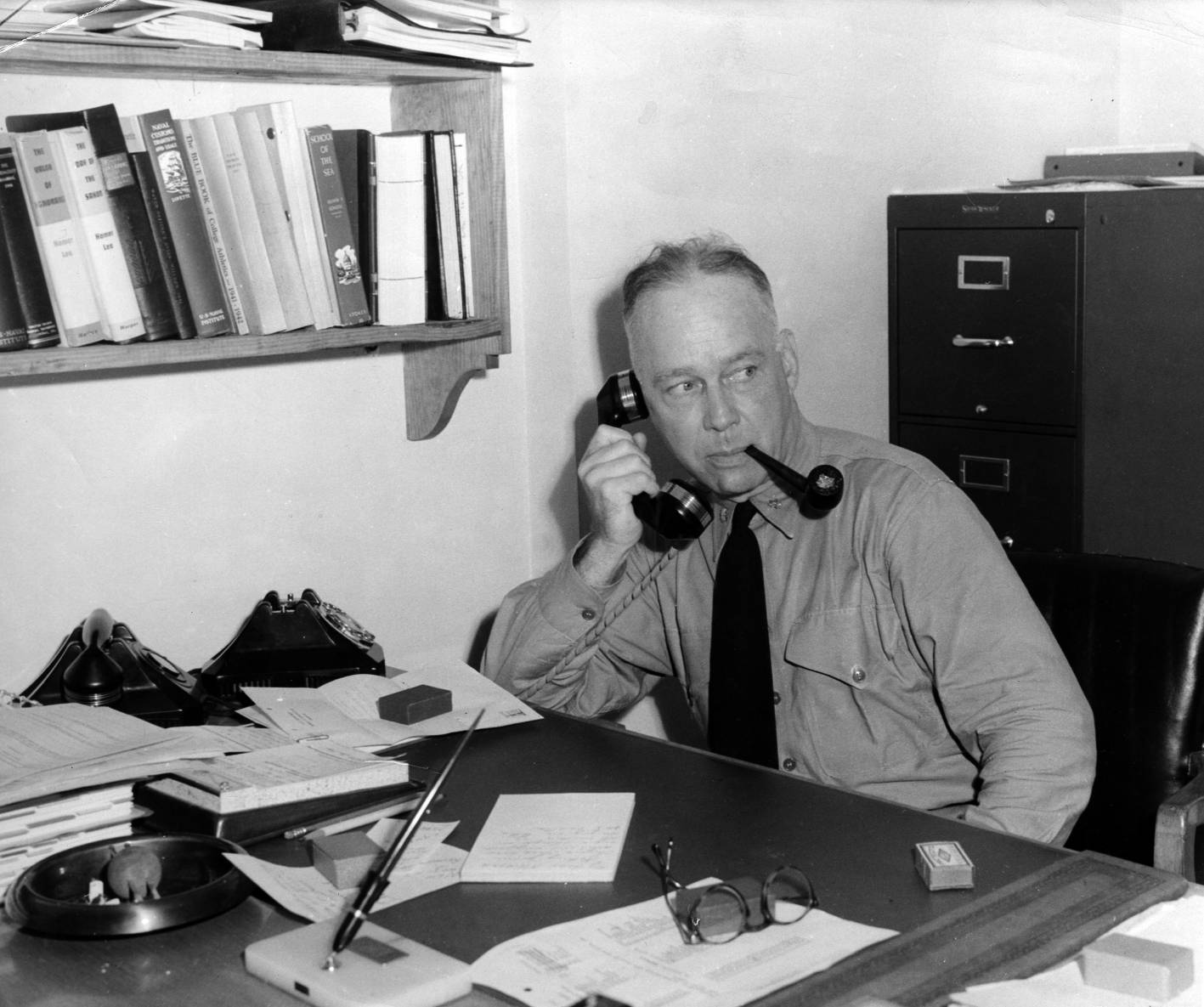
- Kessing while at Chappel Hill
- Born: December 6, 1890; Greensburg, Indiana, US
- Died: January 31, 1963 (aged 72); Bethesda, Maryland, US
- Military career
- Allegiance: United States
- Branch: United States Navy
- Service years: 1914–1947
- Rank: Rear admiral
- Nickname: "Scrappy"
- Commands: Naval Station Port Hueneme; Naval Base Yokosuka; Ulithi Atoll; USS Samaritan; USS Alden
- Conflicts: Veracruz Expedition; World War I: Battle of the Atlantic; World War II: Battle of Guadalcanal; Bougainville Campaign
- Awards: Legion of Merit (3); Navy and Marine Corps Medal; Bronze Star Medal; Commendation Medal (2)
- Other work: AAFC Commissioner

Oliver Owen Kessing (December 6, 1890 – January 31, 1963) was a highly decorated officer in the United States Navy with the rank of rear admiral. A veteran of several conflicts, he rose to the rank of commodore during World War II and commanded several Naval Bases in South Pacific area.

Following the War, Kessing retired from the Navy and assumed job as Deputy Commissioner of the All-America Football Conference (AAFC) under retired Admiral Jonas H. Ingram. He succeeded Ingram in early 1949 and became the third and last commissioner of the AAFC. The AAFC folded after the 1949 season.

== Early career ==
Oliver Owen Kessing was born on December 6, 1890, in Greensburg, Indiana, the son of engineer and contractor Edward Kessing and Rose Moffett. He was of German and Irish descent. Kessing graduated from Greensburg High School in summer 1908 and received an appointment to the United States Naval Academy at Annapolis, Maryland, two years later. While at the Academy, he was active in football, baseball, wrestling and boxing and earned nickname "Scrappy".

Among his classmate were several admirals, who distinguished later during World War II including Wilder D. Baker, John H. Brown Jr., Carleton F. Bryant, Robert W. Cary, Edward L. Cochrane, Richard L. Conolly, Edward Ellsberg, Joseph Redman, Theodore D. Ruddock and John B. W. Waller.

Kessing graduated with Bachelor of Science degree on June 6, 1914, and was commissioned ensign on that date. He was subsequently attached to the armored cruiser USS Maryland and took part in the patrol cruises off the coast of Mexico during the ongoing Mexican Revolution. Kessing was later transferred to the gunboat USS Annapolis and took part in the landing at Mazatlán in June 1916.

He led the group of Marines and sailors ashore and was tasked to parley with Mexican soldiers in order to evacuate American citizens there. Although Mexicans guaranteed safety for United States personnel, Kessing and his group were immediately captured. He was searched by Mexicans who stole some money from him, but he was able to escape them and ordered the boat to return to the Annapolis. During their return to the ship, Kessing and his men came under fire from rifle and pistols, but they returned fire and left seventeen wounded Mexicans in the docks.

In November 1916, Kessing was transferred to the receiving ship USS Rainbow stationed at Yerba Buena Island in San Francisco and was promoted to the rank of Lieutenant (junior grade) on June 6, 1917. Following the United States entry into World War I, Kessing was promoted to the temporary rank of lieutenant on October 15, 1917, and was attached to the armored cruiser USS Huntington.

The Huntington was then stationed at Naval Air Station, Pensacola, Florida, where Kessing trained as a balloon observer for searching for submarines during the protection of convoys. The balloon program was later cancelled and Kessing embarked with Huntington for the Atlantic. He spent remainder of the war on convoy escort duty between England, France and New York City and was transferred to the Bureau of Navigation in Washington, D.C., in August 1918.

== Interwar period ==
Kessing served in Washington until May 1919, when he was ordered to the Bethlehem Shipbuilding Corporation at Quincy, Massachusetts, where he assumed duty in connection with the fitting out of the destroyer USS Meyer. The Meyer was commissioned in December that year and took part in the patrolling off the coast of California and Alaska with cruise to the Caribbean during the disorder in Haiti. Kessing was transferred to the recently commissioned destroyer USS Reuben James in November 1920 as executive officer and took part in the voyage to the Mediterranean with the stops in Dubrovnik, Yugoslavia and Le Havre, France.

In November 1921, Kessing returned to the United States and assumed duty as Officer-in-Charge, Naval Recruiting Stations Indianapolis in his native Indiana. He spent two years in that capacity and joined the destroyer USS McCormick under command of lieutenant commander John H. Cassady in November 1923. Kessing participated in the cruise to the Mediterranean and later was transferred to the battleship USS Wyoming, operating with the Atlantic Fleet. While in this capacity, he was promoted to lieutenant commander on June 4, 1925. During his service with Wyoming Kessing befriended with ships's executive officer and future Fleet Admiral William F. Halsey.

Scrappy Kessing was ordered back to the United States Naval Academy at Annapolis, Maryland, in July 1926 and joined the Department of Physical Training under future four-star admiral Jonas H. Ingram. He served as an instructor in that department and later became first Graduate Manager of Athletics, while Ingram served as Athletics Director. Kessing remained at Annapolis until September 1929, when he joined submarine tender USS Holland under Captain Milo F. Draemel as his navigator. While in this capacity, Holland served as supply depot for the Commander Submarine Divisions, Battle Fleet under future Fleet admiral Chester W. Nimitz, who flew his flag aboard that ship. Kessing served in that capacity until June 1932 and took part in the patrols off the coast of California.

Following a tour of duty in Washington, D.C., with the Bureau of Navigation, Kessing was ordered to the Philippines in early 1934 and served as captain of the yard, Naval Station Olongapo until July that year, when he assumed duty as commanding officer of destroyer USS Alden. He commanded Alden during the patrols in the Pacific until January 1935, when he joined cruiser USS Augusta as ship's executive officer under then-captain and his old superior Chester W. Nimitz. Keesing was promoted to the rank of commander on June 30, 1935, and continued in this capacity under new ship's captain Felix Gygax.

Kessing then took part in the naval operations in the Chinese waters prior the Second Sino-Japanese War until June 1937, when he returned to the Naval Academy at Annapolis, Maryland, for duty as an instructor of boxing in the physical training department. He remained there until early 1939, when he was ordered back to the Asiatic Station as executive officer aboard the transport ship USS Chaumont. Kessing then participated in the evacuation of the civilians from China and assumed command of that ship in January 1940.

== World War II ==
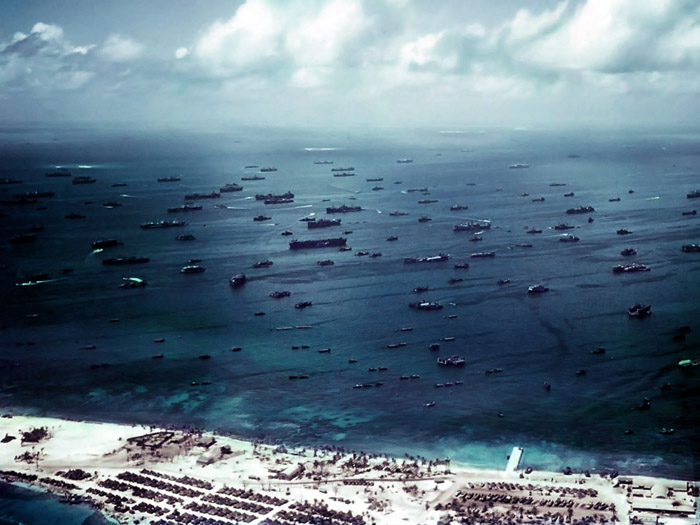
Sorlen Island and the north anchorage of Ulithi atoll, late 1944.

Following the United States entry into World War II, Kessing was ordered to the University of North Carolina at Chapel Hill, where he was tasked with establishing of the first Navy Pre-Flight School. His main task was to give prospective naval aviators the proper naval indoctrination and to give them a physical education course. Kessing was responsible for 1900 Cadets, 200 officers and instructors and 125 enlisted personnel. The Kessing Pool which provided aquatic training for cadets was named in his honor. Kessing also received Legion of Merit for his service at the Chapel Hill.

Kessing served in this capacity until November 1942, when he received orders for deployment to South Pacific. He was requested by his old friend from battleship Wyoming, not Admiral William F. Halsey, who intended to appoint Kessing as commander of the Naval Advanced base at Tulagi, Guadalcanal. The previous commander felt ill and Halsey requested Kessing as his replacement. Halsey also proposed Kessing's promotion to captain, the rank more suitable for that position, but the Bureau of Naval Personnel in Washington, D.C., rejected both Kessing's transfer and promotion. Halsey sent another request, which was ultimately granted and Kessing was transferred by the end of November.

Following his arrival to Tulagi, Kessing was promoted to the temporary of captain on January 20, 1943, and assumed responsibility for the naval advanced base consisted of fleet anchorage, docks for motor torpedo boat depot, seaplane base, barracks for personnel and rest areas including baseball field and officer's club. Late during his tenure, when enemy bomb hits started a raging fire in a supply and ammunition dump, Kessing organized a fire-fighting party and made his way, under constant danger of further air attack, to the dump. Working in a blazing inferno of exploding ammunition, he finally extinguished the fire. For this act of valor, Kessing was decorated with Navy and Marine Corps Medal and also received his second Legion of Merit for his service at Tulagi.

In November 1943, Kessing was relieved of his command at Tulagi and took part in the landing at Bougainville, the main island of New Guinea. He acted informally as chief of staff for naval operations for lieutenant general Oscar Griswold, commander, XIV Corps and subsequently was tasked with the establishing of the Naval Advanced Base at Torokina. Kessing then commanded the base at Torokina until September 1944, when he was transferred to the same capacity at Ulithi Atoll. He was meanwhile promoted to the temporary rank of commodore on August 23, 1944. He was later decorated with his third Legion of Merit.

Kessing was ordered to the Philippines in May 1945 and assumed command of Naval Operating Base Subic Bay and Amphibian Task Force 31, which consisted of Seabees and other engineer units. While in this capacity, he was present aboard the battleship USS Missouri in Tokyo Bay during the Japanese surrender on September 2, 1945. Kessing then assumed command of the United States Fleet base at Yokosuka and was responsible for general administration of the Yokosuka Naval Base, Yokosuka Marine Air Base, and Kisarazu Naval Air Base. He also held additional duty on the General Douglas MacArthur's staff in the occupation forces of Japan. For his service in the last year of the War, Kessing received Bronze Star Medal and two Navy Commendation Medals.

== Postwar career ==
Following the War, Kessing remained in the Navy and returned to the United States in early 1946. He was subsequently appointed commander, Naval Station Port Hueneme, California, and remained in that capacity until his retirement on April 1, 1947, when he retired at his own request after 33 years of commissioned service. Kessing was advanced to the rank of rear admiral on the retired list for having been specially commended in combat.

The reason for his retirement in the Navy, was job offer from his old Navy friend, former Commander-in-Chief, Atlantic Fleet during World War II, Admiral Jonas H. Ingram. Kessin and Ingram knew each other from their service at the Naval Academy in late 1920s, when Ingram served as Academy's Athletics Director and Kessing as First Graduate Manager of Athletics. Ingram now worked for the All-America Football Conference (AAFC) as Commissioner and offered Kessing to be his Deputy.

While in this capacity, Kessing was responsible for the administration of AAFC until the end of January 1949, when Ingram resigned and he assumed the capacity as Commissioner of the AAFC. However, the AAFC was ultimately unable to sustain itself in longtime competition with the National Football League and AFFC was folded in December 1949.

Kessing then settled in Chapel Hill, North Carolina, and died of heart attack at Bethesda Naval Hospital on January 31, 1963, aged 72. He was buried with full military honors at Arlington National Cemetery, Virginia, with his wife, former Jane Moffett buried beside him. They had three sons: Thomas Edward, Oliver O. Jr. (retired as commander, USN), and Jonas Warren.

== Awards and decorations ==
Here is the ribbon bar of Rear admiral Kessing:

1st Row	Legion of Merit with two 5/16" Gold Stars		Navy and Marine Corps Medal
2nd Row	Bronze Star Medal with Combat "V"	Navy Commendation Medal with Combat "V" and 5/16" Gold Star	Mexican Service Medal
3rd Row	World War I Victory Medal with Overseas Clasp	Haitian Campaign Medal	China Service Medal
4th Row	American Defense Service Medal with Clasp	American Campaign Medal	Asiatic-Pacific Campaign Medal with four 3/16 inch service stars
5th Row	World War II Victory Medal	Navy Occupation Service Medal	Philippine Liberation Medal with one star
