= Henry Joseph Ziegemeier =

United States Navy Rear Admiral

- Born: March 27, 1867; Allegheny, Pennsylvania
- Died: October 15, 1930 (aged 63); Naval Hospital, Puget Sound, Washington
- Spouse: Jewel Ziegemeier
- Military career
- Allegiance: United States of America
- Branch: United States Navy
- Service years: 1890–1930
- Rank: Rear Admiral
- Commands: USS Annapolis; USS Denver; USS Iris; USS Cheyenne; USS Virginia; USS California
- Conflicts: World War I
- Awards: Navy Cross; Mexican Service Medal; Spanish Campaign Medal; Victory Medal with Fleet Clasp

Rear Admiral Henry Joseph Ziegemeier (March 27, 1867 – October 15, 1930) was a career officer in the United States Navy (or US Navy) and aboard had commanded USS Annapolis (PG-10), USS Denver (C-14), USS Iris, USS Cheyenne (BM-10), and USS Virginia (BB-13) during the active war years of World War I.

Born and raised in Allegheny, Pennsylvania, Ziegemeier graduated from the Naval Academy Preparatory School on June 6, 1890. With his first naval service in USS Pensacola, he served in four other naval duties until late 1895. For the next two years, he served in Naval Torpedo station, Rhode Island, before returning to sea duty first in USS Annapolis, and later in USS Indiana (BB-1) where he served until June 1908. He served in four more battleships in between October 1908 to April 1911 before serving as the Navy Department's Secretary of the General Board until August 1913. He took command of USS Annapolis which was followed by USS Denver, where he served until June 1915. Around this time, he also commanded the USS Iris and weeks later then in USS Cheyenne.

Returning back as the Navy Department's General Board Secretary and also as the Recorder of the Joint Army-Navy Board, Ziegemeier later commanded USS Virginia (BB-13) from June 1917 during World War I. For his war service, Ziegemeier was awarded the Navy Cross. In the post war years, he served as the first commander of USS California from 1921 to 1922 and then as the Director of Naval Communications until April 1923. This was followed by his service as the Commandant of Navy Yard, Norfolk and of a Naval Operating Base, Virginia. Detached, he served in the USS Pennsylvania (BB-38) during which he also became its Commander of Battleship Division Three. He served as a Commandant in various Navy Yards with his final service being as the Commandant of Puget Sound Navy Yard. In 1927, Ziegemeier was appointed as a Rear Admiral, a position which he held until his death.

On October 15, 1930, Ziegemeier had a cardiac arrest while playing golf in Bremerton, Washington to which he succumbed in Naval Hospital, Puget Sound.

== Biography ==
Service Records of Henry J. Ziegemeier in the 1905 list

Ziegemeier was born on March 27, 1867, and grew up in Allegheny, Pennsylvania. He had been appointed as a Naval Cadet from Ohio on May 21, 1886, and completed the course successfully at the Naval Academy in Annapolis, Maryland on June 6, 1890.

=== Early career ===
In July 1890, Ziegemeier first served in USS Pensacola and thereafter served in USS Charleston (C-2), USS Philadelphia (C-4), USS Adams and USS Bennington (PG-4) until October 1895. After this, he had reported to the Naval Torpedo station in Newport, Rhode Island serving there until July 1897. Upon the completion, he returned to sea duty in USS Annapolis and in May 1899, he had transferred into USS Indiana (BB-1). Having two years experience in Naval Academy, again he went into service there until June 1908.

Following this in between October 1908–April 1911, he took command of USS Hartford, USS Olympia (C-6) and USS Chicago. At the same time, he served as the Navigator, Ordnance officer and Executive officer for the battleship USS West Virginia (ACR-5). He then served in the Navy Department as its Secretary of the General Board until August 1913. Then he assumed command of USS Annapolis and successively transferred to USS Denver in 1914, serving in it until June 1915 when Ziegemeier had become the Commander of Torpedo Flotilla, Pacific Fleet. He also commanded the USS Iris and after several weeks then in USS Cheyenne.

=== World War I ===
In October 1915, Ziegemeier had returned to the Navy Department once again serving as its Secretary of the General Board and additionally as the Recorder of the Joint Army-Navy Board. Detaching from the duty in June 1917, he assumed command of USS Virginia (BB-13) and this tenure marks the most influential time in his career as for his service aboard in the battleship during World War I (WWI), Ziegemeier was awarded the Navy Cross.

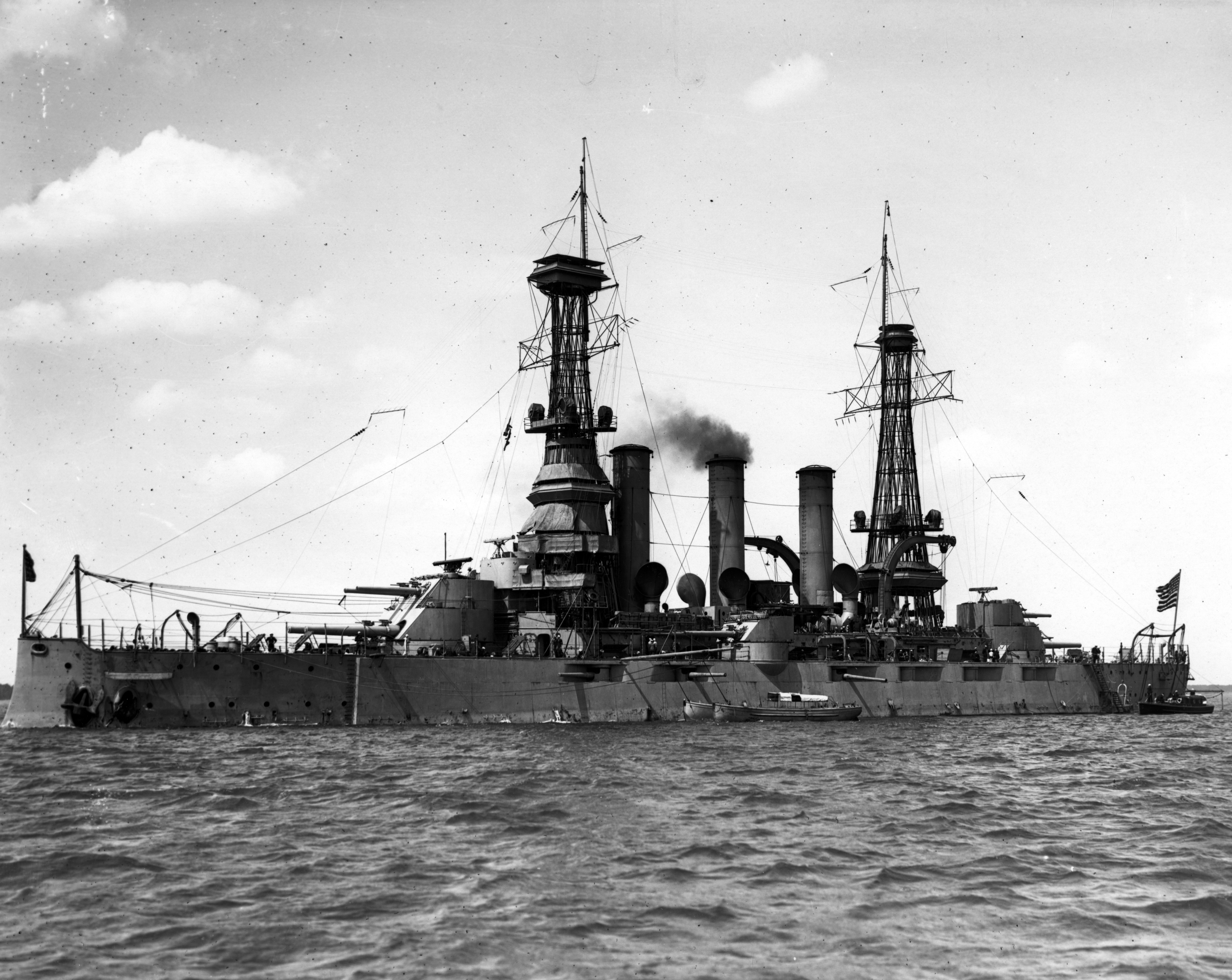
USS Virginia c. WWI

The President of the United States of America takes pleasure in presenting the Navy Cross to Captain Henry Joseph Ziegemeier, United States Navy, for exceptionally meritorious service in a duty of great responsibility as Commanding Officer of the U.S.S. VIRGINIA in the Atlantic Fleet during World War I.

— The United States Navy Memorial

=== Post war years ===
Relieved of command of the Virginia, in July 1919, he reported to Bureau of Navigation where he served until February 1921. He was then the Commandant of Navy Yard located at Mare Island, California for USS California (BB-44) where he took the responsibility of fitting out the battleship until it becomes ready to be commissioned. Upon the commissioning of California on August 10, 1921, he took its command until August 1922. Later he served as the Director of Naval Communications until April 1923.

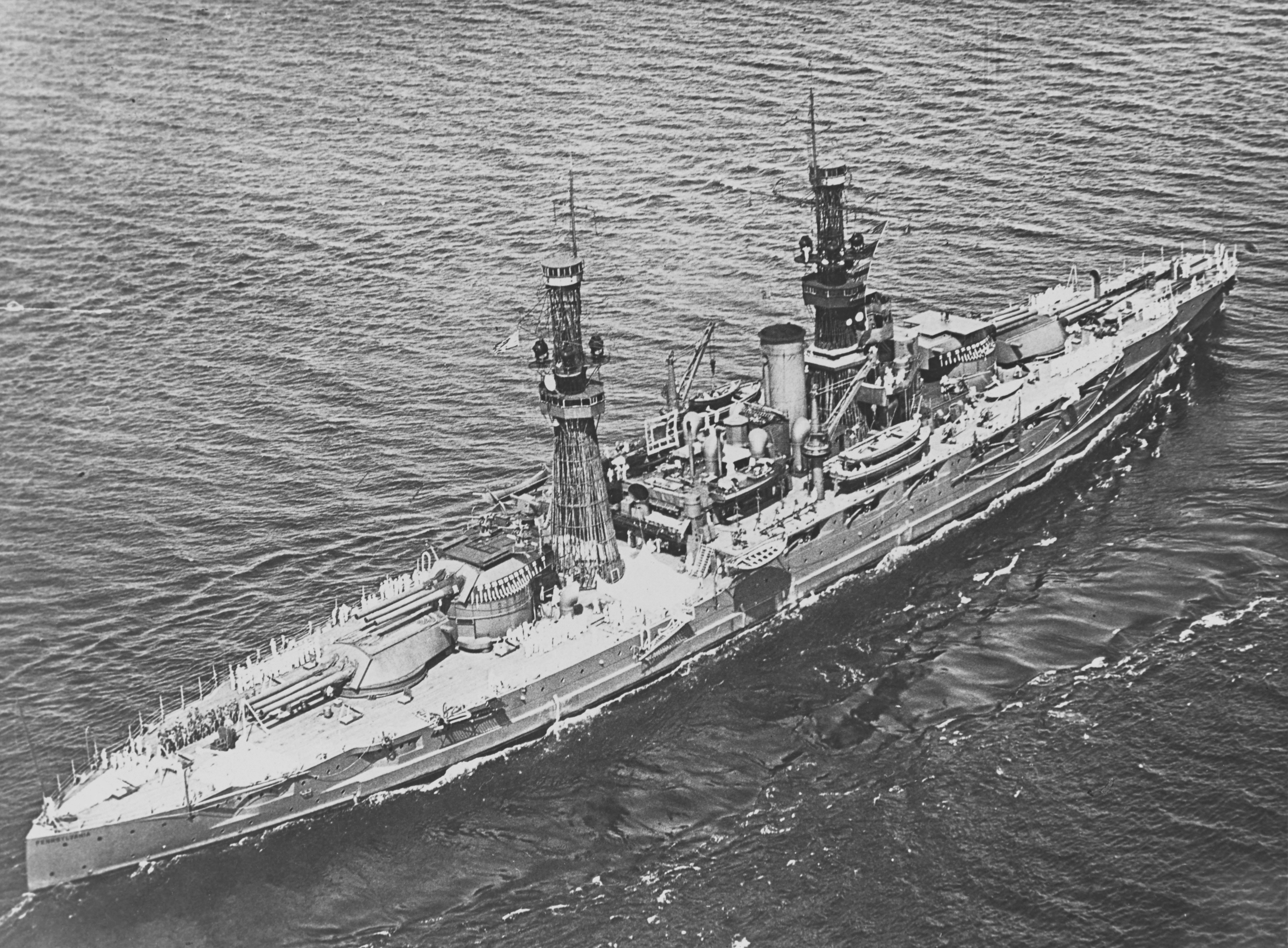
USS Pennsylvania c. 1920s

In May 1923, he was assigned to be the Commandant of Navy Yard at Norfolk, and additionally for the Fifth Naval District and Naval Operating Base at Hampton Roads, Virginia. He was then detached from the Fifth Naval District and Hampton Roads Naval Operating Base duty in August 1923 and Norfolk Navy Yard in December 1924. Following this, for a few weeks he had commanded the USS Pennsylvania (BB-38) during its battle practice. Then he served as the Commander of Battleship Division Three for Battle Fleet of USS Pennsylvania between January 1925–June 1927 following which he became the Director of Fleet Training Division in the office of Chief of Naval Operations, Navy Department.

From November 10, 1927, he served as the Commandant of the US 9th Naval District and also the Naval Training Station of Great Lakes. Upon detachment in June 1928, he served in as Commandant of the 13th Naval District and additionally as Commandant of Puget Sound Navy Yard with his tentative retirement from U.S. Navy dated to be March 27, 1933.

He had also been appointed as a Rear Admiral in 1927, a position in which he served until his untimely death three years later.

=== Death ===
While on active duty in 1930, Ziegemeier had cardiac arrest while playing golf in Bremerton, Washington to which he succumbed in Naval Hospital, Puget Sound on October 15, 1930. He was married to Jewel Ziegemeier.

== Decorations ==
Here is the ribbon bar of Rear Admiral, Henry Joseph Ziegemeier

1st Row	Navy Cross		
2nd Row	Spanish Campaign Medal	Mexican Service Medal	World War I Victory Medal with Fleet Clasp

== See also ==
Military offices
Preceded by Samuel W. Bryant	Director of Naval Communications; 1922 - 1923	Succeeded by Donald C. Bingham
