= John Redman =

John Redman may refer to:

- John Redman (physician) (1722–1808), first president of the Philadelphia College of Physicians
- John Redman (Trinity College) (1499–1551), first Master of Trinity College, Cambridge
- John R. Redman (1898–1970), United States naval officer
- John Redman (sport wrestler), American Olympic wrestler

== See also ==
- John Reedman (1865–1924), Australian sportsman
