= Henry C. Bruton =

United States Navy Rear admiral

Henry Chester Bruton
- Born: March 15, 1905; Belleville, Arkansas, US
- Died: August 15, 1992 (aged 87); Chevy Chase, Maryland, US
- Military career
- Allegiance: United States of America
- Branch: United States Navy
- Service years: 1926–1960
- Rank: Rear Admiral
- Commands: Director of Naval Communications; USS Wisconsin (BB-64); USS S-39
- Conflicts: Yangtze Patrol; World War II: Solomon Islands campaign; Korean War
- Awards: Navy Cross (3); Legion of Merit (4); Navy Commendation Medal

Henry Chester Bruton (15 March 1905 – 15 August 1992) was a rear admiral in the United States Navy, becoming Director of Naval Communications in the 1950s. For his actions during World War II, he was awarded the Navy Cross three times and the Legion of Merit twice. He received the Legion of Merit twice more for contributions to the US Cold War effort in the 1950s, retiring in 1960.

== Early service ==
Henry C. Bruton was born on 15 March 1905 in Belleville, Arkansas as the son of Postal clerk Walther Arthur Bruton and his wife Martha Jane McMullen. He attended the public schools in Little Rock, Arkansas and graduated from the Central High School there in summer of 1921 and was able to secure an appointment to the United States Naval Academy at Annapolis, Maryland. Bruton entered the Academy in June 1922 as Midshipman and during his tenure he was active in Gym squad, also earning nicknames "Ches" or "Brute".

Bruton graduated with Bachelor of Science degree on 3 June 1926 and was commissioned Ensign at that date. He subsequently served aboard the battleships California and Mississippi within the Pacific Fleet before received orders to report for instruction at the Naval Submarine Base New London, Connecticut in June 1929. Concurrently with the transfer order for submarine training, Bruton was promoted to Lieutenant (junior grade).

Upon the completion of the training in January 1930, Bruton was assigned submarine S-47 under lieutenant Dorrance K. Day and took part in peacetime patrol cruises in the Pacific Ocean. During his time with that vessel, he also completed torpedo instruction before being ordered to the Naval Postgraduate School in June 1932. Within his studies, he was sent to the University of California, Berkeley and graduated with a Master of Science degree in Radio engineering in June 1935.

Bruton then joined the submarine Narwhal and participated in the peacetime patrols with the Pacific Fleet off the coast of Hawaii until March 1936 when he was transferred to the staff of Submarine Squadron 5 under Commander Andrew Carl Bennett operating with the Asiatic Fleet. He was promoted to Lieutenant in June 1936 and served as Squadron Communications officer until the beginning of 1937 when he assumed command of submarine S-39. While aboard that vessel, Bruton conducted patrols along the China coast during Second Sino-Japanese War.

In April 1940, Bruton departed Far East and returned stateside for Instruction in the Office of Judge Advocate General of the Navy. He completed the postgraduate course in law and earned a Juris Doctor degree from the George Washington University Law School. Additionally to his degree he also became a member of the Bar of U.S. District Court of appeals for the District of Columbia and a member of the Order of the Coif.

== World War II ==
During World War II, he first commanded the submarine USS Greenling. Bruton was three times awarded the Navy Cross for his command of the Greenling in four wartime patrols, in which it sank 75,000 tons of shipping, including a destroyer attacking it. The Greenling was awarded the Presidential Unit Citation, and Bruton was named a submarine division commander in 1943.

Later, Bruton was named Chief of Staff of the Submarine Force, U.S. Atlantic Fleet and Director of the Legislative Division of the Judge Advocate General's Corps.

During the Korean War, Bruton commanded the battleship USS Wisconsin; in early 1952, the vessel carried out shore bombardments. After the war, he became Director of Naval Communications, and from 1958 until his retirement in 1960 he was communications-electronics director of the Joint Staff of the Commander-in-Chief of the European Command.

After his retirement he worked for Collins Radio until 1964, before becoming secretary-treasurer of the Armed Forces Relief and Benefit Association, and from 1966 a consultant to the Military Benefit Association.

Bruton was awarded the Legion of Merit with award star. In addition, he was authorized to wear the Submarine Combat Patrol insignia.

== Awards ==
- Navy Cross (3) - awarded for actions during World War II
- Legion of Merit (4) - awarded twice for actions during World War II, once for contribution to Operation Castle, and once "for exceptionally meritorious and distinguished service in a position of great responsibility to the Government of the United States as Director, Communications-Electronics Division, Headquarters, United States European Command, from 30 June 1958 to 31 July 1960."
