= Carl Frederick Holden =

United States vice admiral (1895–1953)

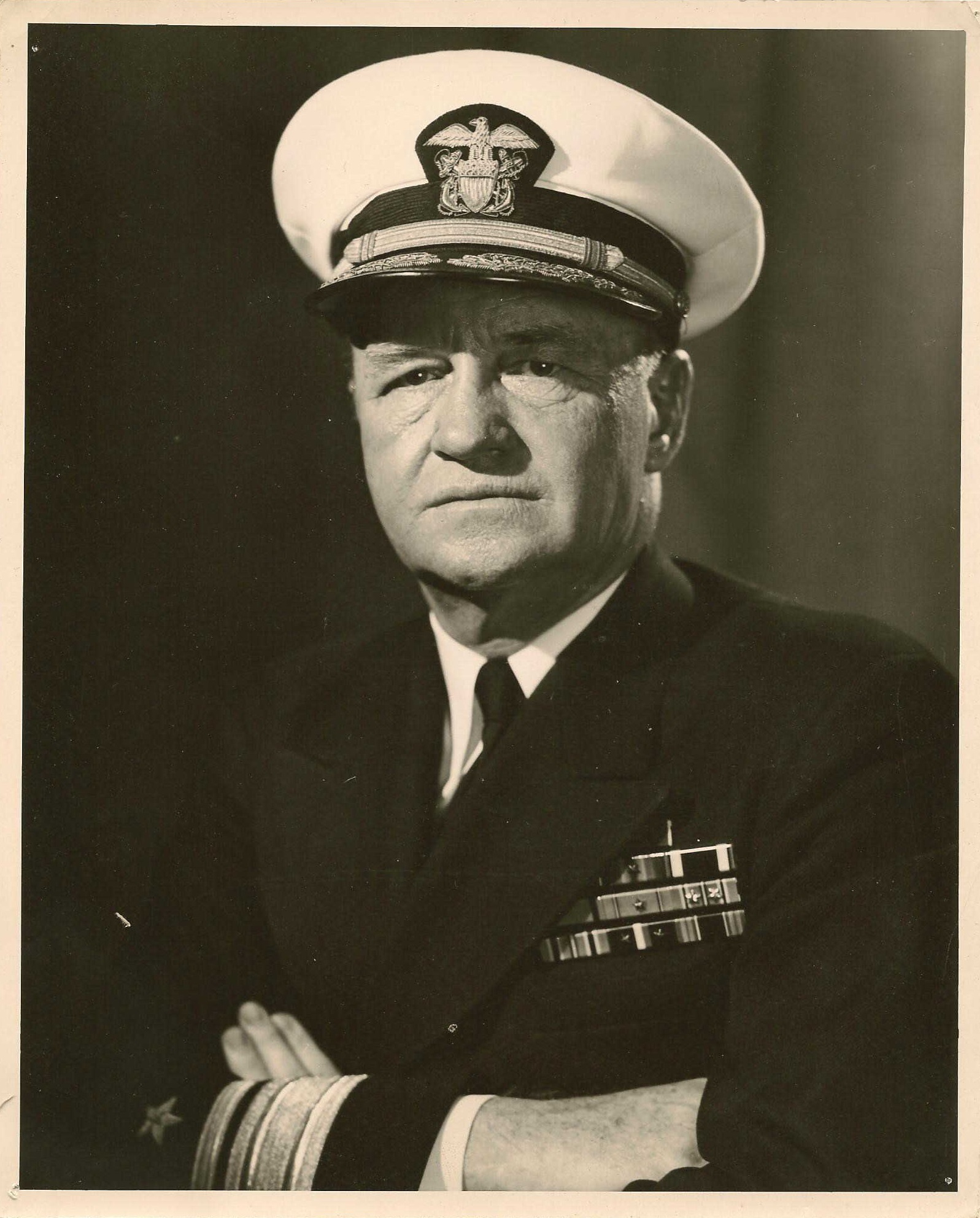
- RADM Carl Holden, USN
- Born: May 25, 1895; Bangor, Maine, US
- Died: May 18, 1953 (aged 57); St. Albans, New York, US
- Military career
- Allegiance: United States of America
- Branch: United States Navy
- Service years: 1917–1952
- Rank: Vice Admiral
- Commands: U.S. Naval Forces Germany; Cruiser Division 18; USS New Jersey; Director of Naval Communications; USS Tarbell; USS Mason
- Conflicts: World War I World War II: Attack on Pearl Harbor; Operation Hailstone; Battle of Saipan; Battle of the Philippine Sea; Battle of Tinian; Battle of Leyte Gulf; Battle of Okinawa
- Awards: Legion of Merit; Bronze Star Medal

Carl Frederick Holden (May 25, 1895 – May 18, 1953) was a decorated officer in the United States Navy who reached the rank of vice admiral. A veteran of both World Wars, he became an expert in Naval communications, graduating with a master's degree in electrical communications from Harvard University. Holden served as Director of Naval Communications between September 1942 - April 1943 and distinguished himself as commanding officer of the battleship USS New Jersey, the flagship of Admiral William F. Halsey. He rose to the admiral's rank in 1945 and commanded Cruiser Division 18 in late phase of the World War II.

During the postwar period, Holden served successively as commander, Operational Training Command, Atlantic Fleet; commandant of the New York Naval Base; and commander, U.S. Naval Forces Germany, before retiring in July 1952.

== Early career ==
Carl F. Holden was born on May 25, 1895, in Bangor, Maine, the son of postmaster and Penobscot Country commissioner, William Holden and his wife Mary Ellen. While on the Bangor High School, he was captain of baseball team and also served as business manager of high school yearbook "Oracle". Holden graduated as an honor student in summer of 1913 and received an appointment to the United States Naval Academy at Annapolis, Maryland, from Representative Frank E. Guernsey.

While at the academy, Holden reached the rank of cadet-lieutenant and served as commander of 11th Cadet Company. He was a member of class German committee and was active in soccer, baseball, and basketball, holding numerals for excellence.

Holden graduated with Bachelor of Science degree on March 29, 1917, and was commissioned ensign on that date. The United States declared war on Germany on April 6, 1917, and Holden was assigned to destroyer Burrows, operating with the Cruiser and Transport Force, Atlantic Fleet. He was promoted to the temporary rank of lieutenant (junior grade) on July 1, 1917, and participated in the anti-submarine patrols and escorting of convoys in English and French waters, operating from the naval base at Queenstown, Ireland.

He was subsequently transferred to destroyer Lansdale under Commander Cary W. Magruder and participated in the patrol cruises in the Mediterranean and Adriatic Seas, visiting former Austrian ports, Rijeka and Split. Following a brief period of occupation duties, Holden was ordered back to the United States for duty in connection with fitting out of destroyer Mason at Norfolk Navy Yard in late 1919. The Mason was commissioned in February 1920 and Holden assumed temporary command before Lieutenant Commander Hartwell C. Davis relieved him on March 8. While aboard Mason, Holder was promoted to lieutenant on July 1, 1920.

== Interwar period ==
Holden was transferred to the destroyer Mahan under lieutenant commander Aubrey W. Fitch in early 1921 and took part in operations in the Caribbean and Panama Canal Zone. He was ordered back to the United States Naval Academy in Annapolis, Maryland, in June 1922 and entered the one-year postgraduate course in Communication Engineering. Upon the graduation in August 1923, he was sent to Harvard University and earned a Master's degree in electrical communications one year later.

In September 1924, Holden was assigned to the staff of commander, Destroyer Squadrons, Scouting Fleet under Rear Admiral Noble E. Irwin aboard squadron's flagship, light cruiser Concord. He assumed duty as squadron radio officer and Irwin's aide and participated in the naval operations in the Atlantic Ocean until November 1927. Admiral Irwin was meanwhile appointed chief of naval mission to Brazil and offered Holden to join his staff. Holden accepted new assignment and was promoted to lieutenant commander.

He served as a member of the naval mission under admiral Irwin until February 1931 and participated in the planning and execution of training for the Brazilian Navy. Holden was subsequently assigned to battleship Arizona under Captain Charles S. Freeman and served as ship's communications officer during the patrols in the Pacific Ocean.

In January 1933, Holden was appointed commanding officer of destroyer Tarbell and for next two years participated in the naval operations with Destroyer Division 3 of the Scouting Force in Atlantic, before switched to Pacific Ocean in late 1934. He was ordered to Pearl Harbor, Hawaii, in January 1935 and assumed duty as district communications officer on the staff of commandant, Fourteenth Naval District under Rear Admiral Harry E. Yarnell. Holden then commanded Pacific Fleet's replenishment oiler Ramapo from the end of April to June 1936, before he was appointed navigator aboard battleship Idaho under Captain Harvey Delano.

Holden was promoted to commander on June 30, 1937, and transferred to Washington, D.C., where he was assigned to the Office of the Chief of Naval Operations. While in this capacity, he was appointed director of radio shore activities in the Office of Naval Communications under Rear Admiral Charles E. Courtney.

In September 1940, Holden was ordered to the Puget Sound Naval Shipyard at Bremerton, Washington, where he joined battleship Pennsylvania located there for overhaul. He was appointed ships's executive officer under Captain Charles M. Cooke Jr. and took part in the patrol cruises with the Pacific Fleet off the coast of Hawaii and California.

== World War II ==
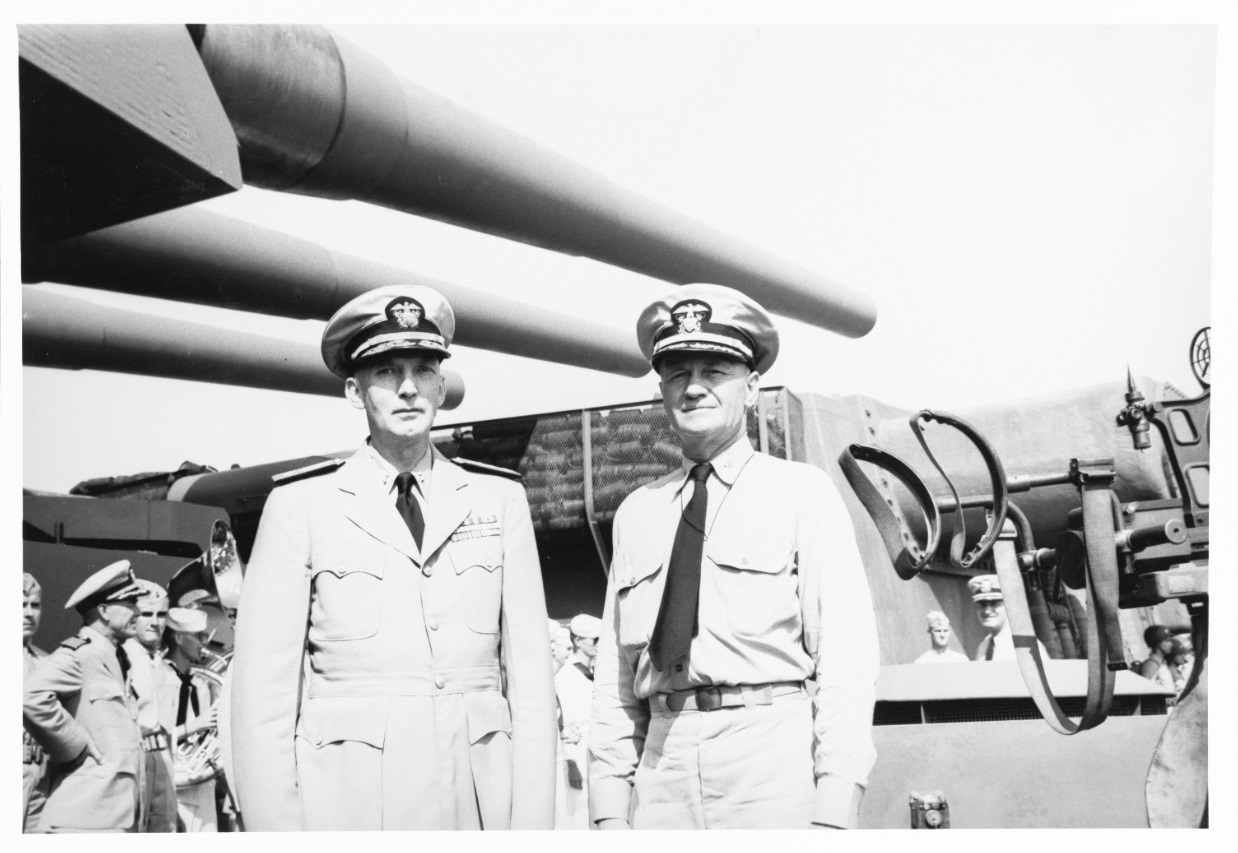
Holden (right) with Rear Admiral Donald B. Beary during inspection of battleship New Jersey at Norfolk Navy Yard in September 1943

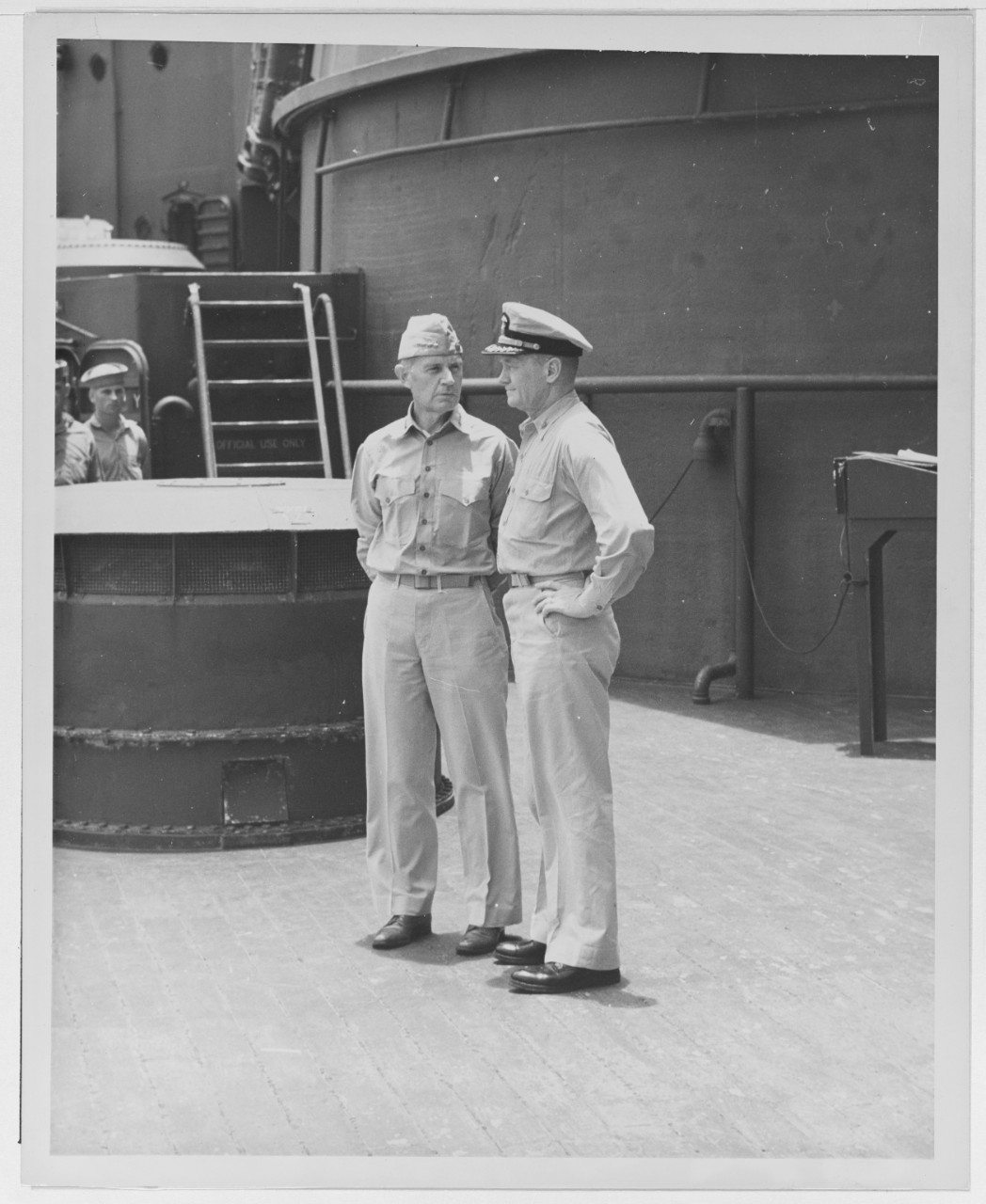
Holden (right) with Admiral Raymond A. Spruance, Commander, U.S. Fifth Fleet aboard battleship New Jersey in April 1944 in Pacific.

At the time of the Japanese attack on Pearl Harbor on December 7, 1941, Pennsylvania was located in Dry Dock No. 1 undergoing a refit. Holden participated in the defense of the ship against enemy torpedo and fighter planes and Pennsylvania received less damage than other U.S. ships with only two officers and 16 enlisted men killed. He was transferred to Washington, D.C., in January 1942 and assumed duty as Fleet Communication Officer on the Staff of the Commander-in-Chief of the United States Fleet under Admiral Ernest J. King. Holden was promoted to captain on June 30, 1942, and appointed Director of Naval Communications three months later. While in that assignment, he was responsible for organizing, administering and operating the entire Naval Communications Service. Together with Commander Edward Travis, his deputy director, and Frank Birch, head of the German Naval Section, they established, on October 2, 1942, a UK:US accord which may have "a stronger claim than BRUSA to being the forerunner of the UKUSA Agreement," being the first agreement "to establish the special Sigint relationship between the two countries," and "it set the pattern for UKUSA, in that the United States was very much the senior partner in the alliance." It established a relationship of "full collaboration" between Bletchley Park and OP-20-G.

In April 1943, Holden was ordered to Philadelphia Navy Yard for duty in connection with fitting out of battleship New Jersey. One month later, New Jersey was commissioned and embarked for training cruise to the Western Atlantic and Caribbean Sea, which lasted until January 1944. Holden then led his ship through the Panama Canal to Funafuti, Ellice Islands, where joined United States Fifth Fleet under Admiral Raymond A. Spruance, who subsequently broke his flag aboard New Jersey.

Holden led New Jersey during the Operation Hailstone on February 17–18, 1944; a two-day surface and air strike conducted by Fleet's task force against the major Japanese fleet base on Truk in the Carolines. During the assault, New Jersey destroyed a Japanese trawler and, with other ships, sank the destroyer Maikaze and also participated in the anti-aircraft cover for her formation.

Between March 17 and April 10, New Jersey participated in an air and surface bombardment of Mille, then rejoined Task Group 58.2 for a strike against shipping in the Palaus, and bombarded Woleai. Upon his return to Majuro, Admiral Spruance transferred his flag to Indianapolis. She then screened the carrier striking force which gave air support to the invasion of Aitape, Tanahmerah Bay and Humboldt Bay, New Guinea, April 22, then shelled shipping and shore installations at Truk on April 29–30. New Jersey and her formation shot down two enemy torpedo bombers at Truk. Her 16-inch salvos pounded Ponape May 1, destroying fuel tanks, badly damaging the airfield, and demolishing a headquarters building.

Holden then led his ship during the preinvasion strikes on Mariana Islands, when her heavy guns battered Saipan and Tinian, in advance of the marine landings on June 15. He also took part in the Battle of the Philippine Sea, when anti-aircraft fire of New Jersey and the other screening ships proved virtually impenetrable; two American ships were slightly damaged during the battle and enemy lost three fleet aircraft carriers.

In early August 1944, New Jersey arrived to Pearl Harbor, Hawaii, for overhaul and transferred to the United States Third Fleet under Admiral William F. Halsey, who broke his flag aboard New Jersey. Holden and Third Fleet departed Hawaii one month later and steamed to the targets in the Visayas and the southern Philippines, then Manila and Cavite, Panay, Negros, Leyte, and Cebu. Early in October raids to destroy enemy air power based on Okinawa and Formosa were begun in preparation for the Leyte landings of October 20, 1944.

Holden took part in the Battle of Leyte Gulf three days later, where his ship provided anti-aircraft cover for allied carriers and then sailed for strikes on central and southern Luzon. Following the fighting on Leyte and Luzon, Holden and New Jersey found themselves in a fight for their lives when Typhoon Cobra overtook the force—seven fleet and six light carriers, eight battleships, 15 cruisers, and about 50 destroyers—during their attempt to refuel at sea. At the time the ships were operating about 300 miles (500 km) east of Luzon in the Philippine Sea. Holden's skillful seamanship brought New Jersey through the storm largely unscathed and she returned to Ulithi on Christmas Eve of 1944. For his service as commanding officer of New Jersey, Holden received the Bronze Star Medal with Combat "V".

By the end of January 1945, Holden was promoted to rear admiral and assumed duty as commander of newly created Cruiser Division 18, consisting of brand new light cruisers Topeka (flagship); Duluth; Atlanta; and Dayton. Following a period of division's formation, he took part in the Battle of Okinawa in May–June 1945 and received Legion of Merit with Combat "V" for his service.

== Postwar service ==
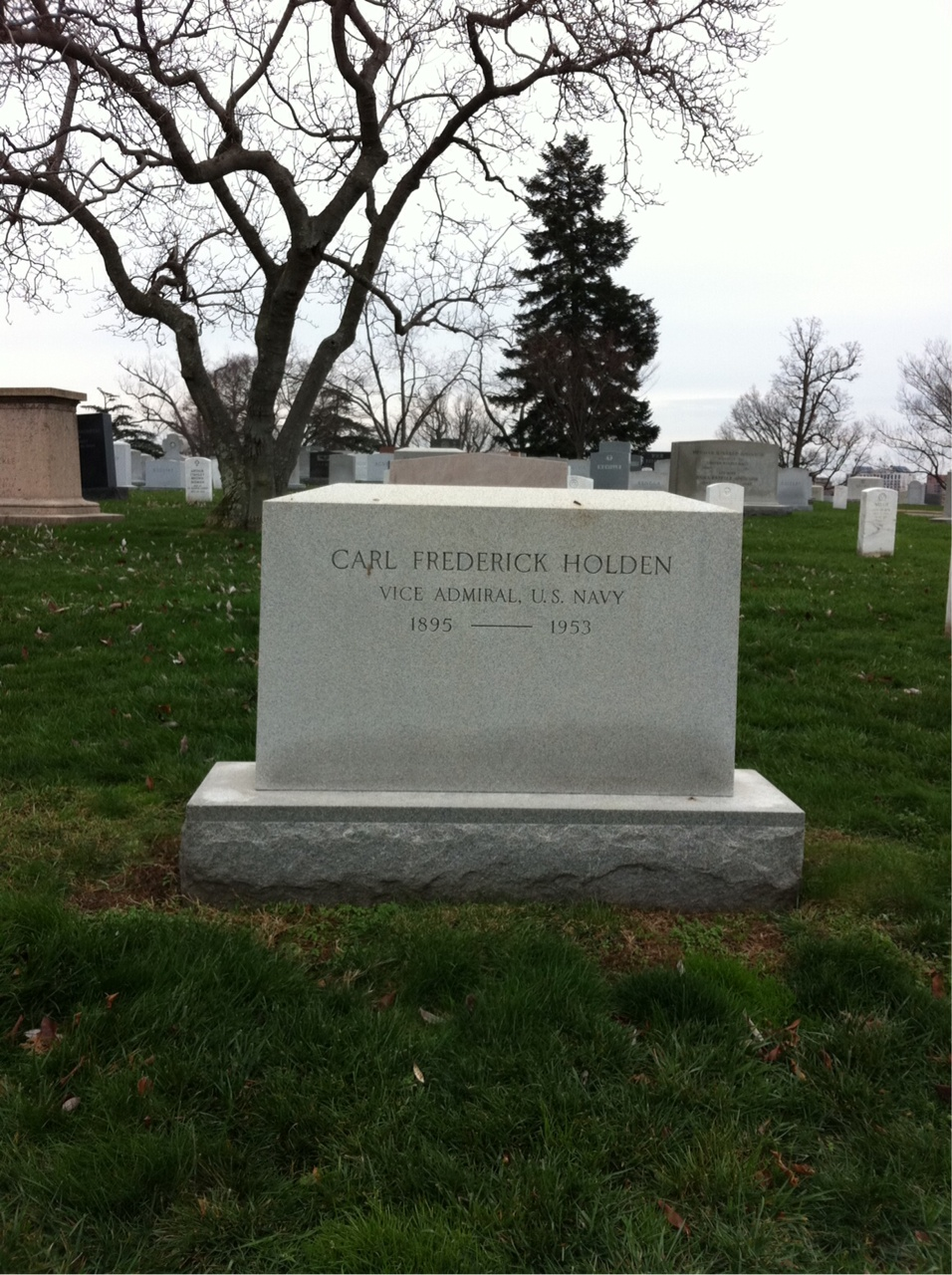
Holden's grave at Arlington National Cemetery.

Following the surrender of Japan, Holden was present aboard the battleship Missouri during the formal ceremony on September 2, 1945. He then participated in the first stages of the occupation of Japan and returned to the United States in April 1946 for new assignment. Holden relieved Rear admiral Carleton F. Bryant as Commander Fleet Operational Training Command, United States Atlantic Fleet with headquarters at Norfolk Navy Yard, Virginia. While in this capacity, he was subordinated to Commander-in-Chief, Atlantic Fleet, Admiral Jonas H. Ingram and was responsible for providing initial training to ships of the Fleet and keeping them abreast of new developments.

Holden served in that capacity until the end of August 1948, when he was appointed commander of New York Naval Base. His command included Brooklyn Navy Yard; the Naval Supply Depot and Naval Salvage School in Bayonne, New Jersey; the Naval Receiving Station Brooklyn; the Naval Dental Clinic Brooklyn; the Marine Barracks, Naval Shipyard Brooklyn; the United States Naval Hospital in St. Albans, Queens; and Naval Ammunition Depot Earle, New Jersey.

By the end of March 1951, Holden was ordered to Europe and assumed duty as commander, U.S. Naval Forces Germany with headquarters in Heidelberg. He also held additionally duty as a member of the Inter-Allied Advisory Council and returned to the United States in June 1952. Holden retired from active duty on July 1, 1952, after 35 years of commissioned service and was advanced to the rank of vice admiral on the retired list for having been specially commended in combat.

== Death ==
Upon his retirement from the Navy, Holden was employed as President of the Research Unit of International Telephone and Telegraph, but died after a brief illness in the Naval Hospital in St. Albans, New York, on May 18, 1953, aged 57. He was buried with full military honors at Arlington National Cemetery, Virginia, and his honorary pallbearers were admirals William F. Halsey, Arthur D. Struble, Walter S. DeLany, Leonard B. Austin, Donald B. Duncan, Maurice E. Curts, Roscoe H. Hillenkoetter and Harry B. Jarrett.

Holden was survived by his wife Cordelia Carlisle Holden, a daughter, Jean Holden, and son, Carl Jr., who also graduated from the United States Naval Academy at Annapolis, Maryland.

== Decorations ==
Here is the ribbon bar of Vice admiral Holden:

1st Row	Legion of Merit with Combat "V"	Bronze Star Medal with Combat "V"	World War I Victory Medal with Atlantic Fleet Clasp
2nd Row	Army of Occupation of Germany Medal	China Service Medal	American Defense Service Medal with Fleet Clasp
3rd Row	Asiatic–Pacific Campaign Medal with two silver 3/16 inch service stars	American Campaign Medal	World War II Victory Medal
4th Row	Navy Occupation Service Medal	National Defense Service Medal	Philippine Liberation Medal with two stars

== Notes ==
- Proceedings of the IRE, September 1943, p. 525. Accessed through IEEE Explore. May 13, 2009

Military offices
Preceded by John E. Wilkes	Commander, United States Naval Forces Germany; April 1951 – June 1952	Succeeded by Howard E. Orem
Preceded by Russell S. Berkey	Commander, New York Naval Base; August 23, 1948 - March 20, 1951	Succeeded by Roscoe H. Hillenkoetter
Preceded by Joseph R. Redman	Director of Naval Communications; September 1942 - April 1943	Succeeded by Joseph R. Redman
