= Gilbert Jonathan Rowcliff =

United States Navy rear admiral

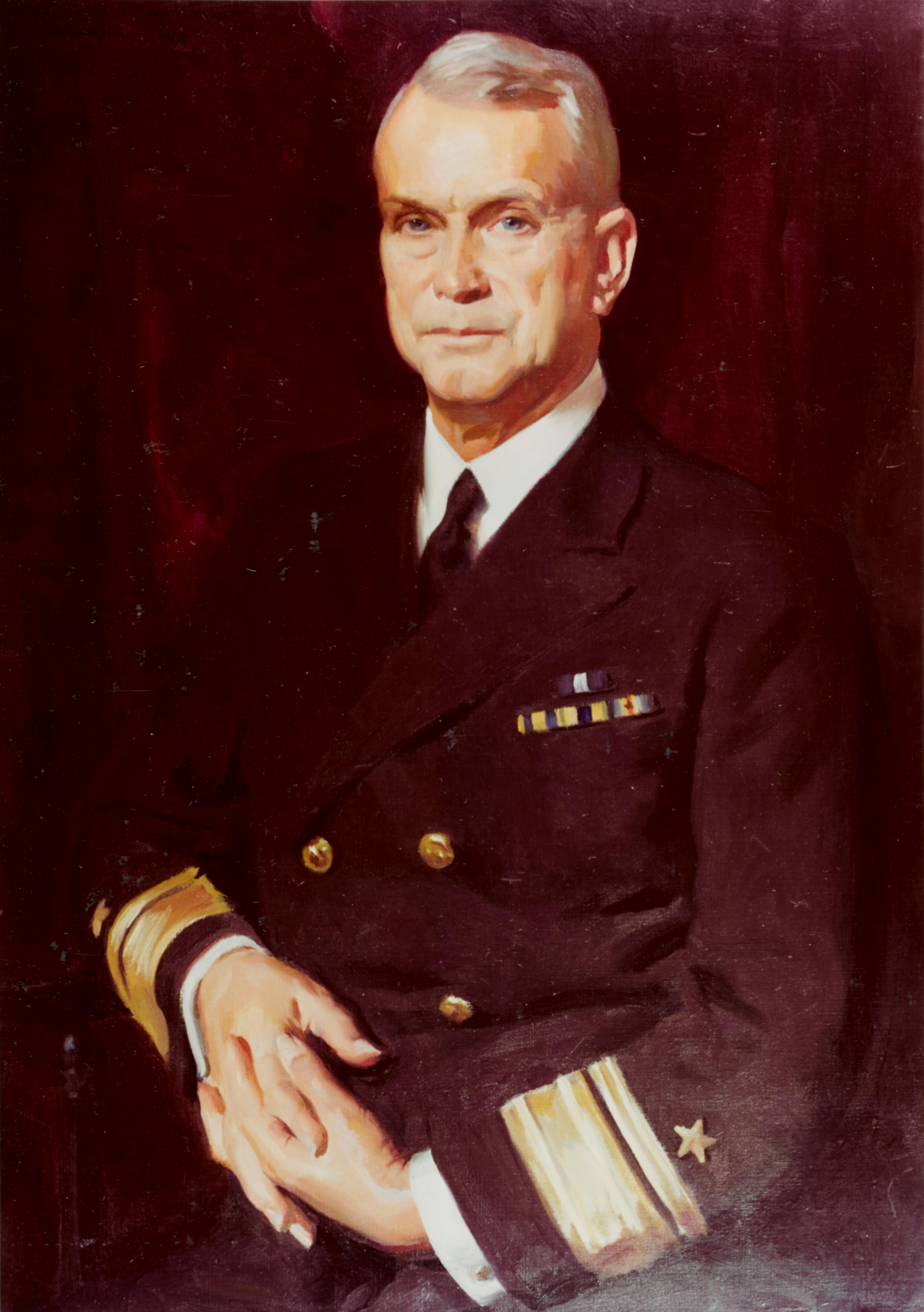
- Portrait of Rear Admiral Rowcliff by Albert Murray
- Born: July 22, 1881; Peoria, Illinois, U.S.
- Died: July 14, 1963 (aged 81)
- Military career
- Allegiance: United States of America
- Branch: United States Navy
- Service years: 1896–1945
- Rank: Rear admiral
- Units: USS Reuben James (DD-245); USS Childs (DD-241); USS Cincinnati (CL-6); USS Constellation
- Commands: Commander Destroyer Squadron 4 Commander Cruisers, Scouting Force; Director of Naval Communications; Judge Advocate General; Commander Cruiser Division 5 Commander Cruiser Division 4
- Conflicts: World War I World War II
- Awards: Navy Cross

Rear Admiral Gilbert Jonathan Rowcliff (July 22, 1881 – July 14, 1963) was an officer of the United States Navy during the First World War and the Second World War. After early service in the Far East, he specialised in gunnery, serving in that capacity on many US Navy capital ships. During World War I he served with the US Naval Force sent to join the British Grand Fleet.

After the war he took command of multiple heavy units of the US fleet, before being appointed Judge Advocate General of the Navy in 1936. Thereafter he commanded various cruiser squadrons of the Atlantic Fleet before his retirement at the end of World War II.

== Early life and career ==
Rowcliff was born in Peoria, Illinois. He attended public school in Peoria before his appointment to the United States Naval Academy from Illinois in 1896. While a midshipman he took an active part in fencing and intercollegiate tournaments which were being developed at that time. Graduated in May, 1902, he served the two years at sea which were then required by law before commissioning and was commissioned ensign in May 1904. Rowcliff was subsequently promoted as follows: Lieutenant (both grades) May 2, 1907; lieutenant commander, March 22, 1915; commander, July 1, 1919; captain, February 23, 1925; and rear admiral, January 1, 1936. He was transferred to the retired list of the Navy in that rank on August 1, 1945.

After graduation in May, 1902, he was ordered to the Asiatic Station, where he joined the gunboat USS Wilmington, a unit of the Asiatic Fleet on patrol duty in Chinese waters. When the Wilmington was placed out of commission on June 30, 1904, at Cavite in the Philippines, he was transferred to the USS Oregon (BB-3), a coast battleship on duty in Pacific and Asiatic waters, and served in that vessel until her decommissioning in May 1906.

== Atlantic Fleet ==
He returned to the United States in June 1906 for duty in the Presidential yacht USS Mayflower (PY-1), and was aboard when President Theodore Roosevelt reviewed the Battleship Squadron on its return from a round-the-world cruise in 1909. He had additional duty from November 1908 until October 1910 as Naval Aide at the White House, serving both Presidents Roosevelt and William Howard Taft. In October 1910 he joined the USS Virginia (BB-13), and served as ordnance officer of that battleship from May to July 1911. He was then assigned duty as division ordnance officer, still attached to the Virginia, flagship of the Fourth Division, later with the Third Division, Atlantic Fleet.

Detached from the Virginia In January 1914, he assisted in fitting out the USS New York (BB-34), and served as ordnance officer of that battleship from her commissioning, April 15, 1914, until June 1916. He was next assigned duty as aide on the staff of commander, second in command, Atlantic Fleet, and to such gunnery duties as assigned and in that capacity served on the staff of Vice Admiral DeWitt Coffman, USN, commander, Battleship Force, Atlantic Fleet flagship USS Arkansas (BB-33), later USS Wyoming (BB-32). In December 1916 he had additional duty as a member of the board which conducted battery tests of the USS Arizona (BB-39). In January 1917 he was assigned temporary duty as senior member of the board appointed for the purpose of studying torpedo policy for the Navy, and in April of that year was a member of the board conducting experimental firing of the 3-gun turrets on the Arizona. He then returned to the Wyoming, to continue duty on the staff of Commander Battleship Force, Atlantic Fleet, and in July 1917, when Vice Admiral Coffman was designated commander, Battleship Force 2, he (then a lieutenant commander) continued to serve as aide on his staff. In April 1918 he had temporary additional duty in Rosyth, Scotland, in connection with the storing of reserve ammunition for Battleship Division 9. For World War I service he was awarded the Navy Cross with the following citation:

For exceptionally meritorious service in a duty of great responsibility as Gunnery Officer on the Staff of the Commander, Battleship Force Two of the Atlantic Fleet, in which capacity, during a trip aboard he acquired valuable information as to foreign methods of fire control, which later were applied by him with excellent results in improving target practice in the Atlantic Fleet.

In September and October 1918, shortly before the Armistice, he reported to the Office of the Chief of Naval Operations, Navy Department, Washington, D.C., On October 27, 1918, he became executive officer in the New York, and served in that capacity until April 1919, and was present when the German High Seas Fleet surrendered to the British Fleet at the Firth of Forth, on November 21, 1918. He was also on board when the New York was host to King George V of Great Britain and the Prince of Wales on November 3; and Crown Prince Hirohito, later Emperor of Japan and his staff on November 20, all of whom were official guests of the ship.

From May 1919 until May 1920, he was a student at the Naval War College, Newport, Rhode Island. Completing the senior course, he served in the Division of War Plans, and later the Budget Section of the Office of the Chief of Naval Operations, Navy Department, Washington, D.C., with additional duty in May 1921 as a member of the board for the Development of the Navy Yard Plans. In December 1922 he returned to sea as division commander, with Destroyer Squadrons, Atlantic Fleet, with additional duty as commander of the division flagship, the USS Reuben James (DD-245) later the USS Childs (DD-241).

== Higher command ==
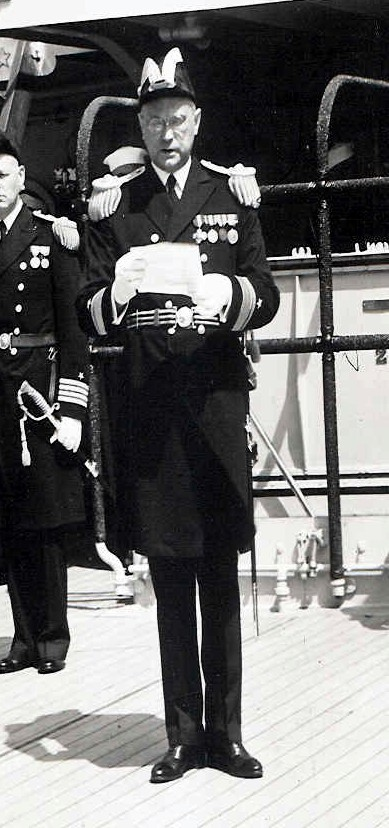
Rear Admiral Rowcliff assuming command of Cruiser Scouting Force aboard USS Chicago in 1938

In November 1923 he returned to the Navy Department for duty on the Staff of Vice Admiral Robert E. Coontz, USN, commander in chief, U. S. Fleet, as Fleet Material Officer and Fleet Tactical Officer. Detached from that assignment in June 1925 he was an instructor in the department of engineering and aeronautics, at the Naval Academy, the three succeeding years. Returning to sea in July 1928, then Captain Rowcliff, commanded the USS Cincinnati (CL-6) for two years, and from July 1930 until May 1933 had command of the Naval Training Station, Newport, Rhode Island, with additional duty in command of the USS Constellation, famous frigate attached to that training station.

In June 1933 he assumed command of Destroyer Squadron Four, Battle Force, U. S. Fleet, and a year later returned to the Navy Department, to serve as Director of Naval Communications. In June 1936 he was promoted to rear admiral and appointed Judge Advocate General of the Navy, a position he held for two years. Again at sea, from July 1938 until February 1941, he served as Commander Cruisers, Scouting Force, with additional duty a commander, Cruiser Division Five, USS Chicago (CA-29), Flagship, and as commander, Cruiser Division Four, USS Northampton (CA-26), Flagship. In March 1941 he was designated a member of the Navy General Board. He served in that capacity throughout the World War II period, until his retirement on August 1, 1945. He continued active duty as senior member of the Board of Inspection and Survey, Pacific Coast Section, San Francisco, California, until December 8, 1945, at which time he was relieved of all active duty.

Rowcliff died on July 14, 1963, and was buried at Arlington National Cemetery two days later.

== Awards ==
In addition to the Navy Cross, Rear Admiral Rowcliff was awarded the Mexican Service Medal, the Spanish Campaign Medal, the World War I Victory Medal, and was entitled to wear the American Defense Service Medal, the American Campaign Medal, and the World War II Victory Medal.

	Navy Cross	
Spanish Campaign Medal	Mexican Service Medal	World War I Victory Medal
American Defense Service Medal	American Campaign Medal	World War II Victory Medal

== Mentions in popular culture ==
Rex Stout used Rowcliff, under whom he had at one time served and came to greatly dislike, as the model for the stuttering, officious Lieutenant George Rowcliff in the Nero Wolfe series of novels.
