= Director of Naval Communications =

Director of Naval Communications was a post on the staff of the United States Navy's Chief of Naval Operations responsible for organizing, administering and operating the Naval Communications Service. In Navy parlance, this was Op-20. Created in 1916, the position replaced that of the Superintendent of the Naval Radio Service, created in 1912. The position, and the responsibilities, evolved steadily over the next several generations.

== Directors of Naval Communications, 1912-1950 ==
- 1912-1916 Capt. William H.G. Bullard [previously Superintendent of the Naval Radio Service]
- 1916-1919 Capt. David W. Todd
- 1919-1921 Rear Admiral William H.G. Bullard
- 1921 Rear Admiral Marbury Johnston
- 1921-1922 Capt. Samuel W. Bryant (acting)
- 1922-1923 Rear Admiral Henry J. Ziegemeier
- 1923 Commander Donald C. Bingham
- 1923-1924 Capt. Orton P. Jackson
- 1924-1927 Capt. Ridley McLean
- 1927-1928 Rear Admiral Thomas T. Craven
- 1928-1935 Capt. Stanford C. Hooper
- 1935-1936 Rear Admiral Gilbert Jonathan Rowcliff
- 1936-1939 Rear Admiral Charles E. Courtney
- June 1939-February 1942 Rear Admiral Leigh Noyes
- February–September 1942 Capt. Joseph R. Redman
- September 1942-April 1943 Capt. Carl Frederick Holden
- April 1943-August 1945 Rear Admiral Joseph R. Redman
- 1946-1949 Rear Admiral Earl E. Stone
- 1949-1951 Rear Admiral John R. Redman
- 1951-1952 Captain Wilfred B. Goulett

== Evolution of Naval Communications after 1950 ==
The Naval Communications Service was created as a subset of the Naval Communications System on 29 August 1950 by the Chief of Naval Operations, with the Director of Naval Communications overseeing this from Washington, D.C. In 1959, as a result of the Committee on the Organization of the Department of the Navy (known as the Franke Report), the title of the Director of Naval Communications became the Assistant Chief of Naval Operations (Communications)/Director Naval Communications. After the reorganization of OPNAV in 1966-67 following the Benson report, the incumbent was simultaneously a member of the Chief of Naval Operations' own staff and in charge of a new independent command, the Naval Communications Command.

== Directors of Naval Communications, 1950-1971 ==
- 1952-1955 Rear Admiral William B. Ammon
- 1955-1958 Rear Admiral Henry C. Bruton
- 1961-1965 Rear Admiral Bernard F. Roeder
- 1965-1968 Rear Admiral Robert H. Weeks
- 1968 (Mar-July) Captain Robert H. White
- 1968-1971 Rear Admiral Francis J. Fitzpatrick

== Evolution of Naval Communications after 1971 ==
In 1971, Naval Communications Command was subordinated to a new OP-94 entity, the Director, Command Support Programs (OP-94) in March 1971, with naval communications becoming a new entity, OP-941 underneath. On 1 June 1973, the command was redesignated the Naval Telecommunications Command.

In December 1990, this was redesignated the Naval Computer and Telecommunications Command.

In 2002, this combined with several other U.S. Navy elements to form the new Naval Network Warfare Command, which in 2010 joined with several other elements to be a part of Fleet Cyber Command/United States Tenth Fleet, a component of United States Cyber Command.

== Directors of Naval Communications since 1973 ==
- 1971-1973 Rear Admiral Samuel L. Gravely, Jr.
- 1973-1975 Rear Admiral Jon L. Boyes
- 1977-1980 Rear Admiral Clyde R. Bell
