= Task Force 61 =

US Navy task force

Task Force 61 (CTF-61) is a task force of the United States Navy that today denotes what used to be designated the Mediterranean Amphibious ready group (MARG) of the United States Sixth Fleet. It is composed of approximately three Amphibious assault ships, but in 2008 is designated the Expeditionary Strike Group that includes their embarked landing craft. From these ships, United States Marine Corps ground forces can move ashore by sea and air in amphibious assault or emergency evacuation missions. Once ashore, the ships of Task Force 61 are able to logistically support the ground forces, until the objective of the landing has been accomplished.

The TF 61 designation has been used by the United States Navy since World War II.

== World War II ==
Task Force 61 was formed for Operation WATCHTOWER, the Guadalcanal campaign of 1942. Admiral Robert L. Ghormley, Commander, South Pacific Area, issued Operation Plan No. 1–42 on 16 July 1942. OP 1-42 created TF 61 (the Expeditionary Force of 82 ships), commanded by Vice-Admiral Frank Jack Fletcher.TF 61.1 was the escort under Rear Admiral Leigh Noyes for TF 61.2, the amphibious force under Rear Admiral Richmond K. Turner. The main landing force was to be the 1st Marine Division.

OP 1-42 specified "Task One" for TF 62 in three phases. The first phase was a rehearsal in the Fiji Islands. The second phase was the seizure and occupation of Tulagi and Guadalcanal (). The projected third and final phase was to be the occupation of Ndeni in the Santa Cruz Islands, but this was cancelled.

Later, in October 1942, TF 61, now under Rear Admiral Thomas C. Kinkaid, consisted of USS Enterprise, USS South Dakota, cruisers USS Portland and USS San Juan, and eight destroyers. The Task Force formed one of the two U.S. carrier groups that took part in the Battle of the Santa Cruz Islands. As such it represented the combined command of Task Force 11, Task Force 16, and Task Force 18.

Task Force 61 was dissolved in the Pacific Theater and became Task Group 92.4. TF 61 was reactivated in the Atlantic under Royal Navy command for convoy escort duties. Initially it included US Navy Destroyer Division 60, Destroyer Escort Division 5, and a number of United States Coast Guard and Free French Navy vessels. In May 1944 it included HMS Queen Elizabeth, Richelieu, HMS Cumberland, the Royal Netherlands Navy light cruiser HNLMS Tromp, 21st Carrier Squadron, and HM Destroyers Saumarez, Vigilant, Verulam, Nubian, and Tartar.

== Cold War ==
The TF 61 designation has been used in the Mediterranean since the late 1940s.

In the early 1960s the Task Force included rotation of Amphibious Squadron Six CTF USS Casa Grande, and Amphibious Squadron Four CTF USS Fremont.

On 22 July 1974, 466 foreign nationals were air-lifted via helicopter to the USS Coronado and USS Trenton of Task Force 61 for transport to Beirut, Lebanon. U.S. naval forces in the area remained on high state of readiness through 2 September 1974 as the situation on Cyprus began to stabilize.

In 1982, during the Multi-National Force deployment to Lebanon, the Commander, Amphibious Task Force (CTF 61) was designated Commander, U.S. Forces Lebanon.

== Fiction literature ==
Task Force 61 is the subject of several military fiction novels by David Poyer.
