= Leigh Noyes =

United States Navy admiral

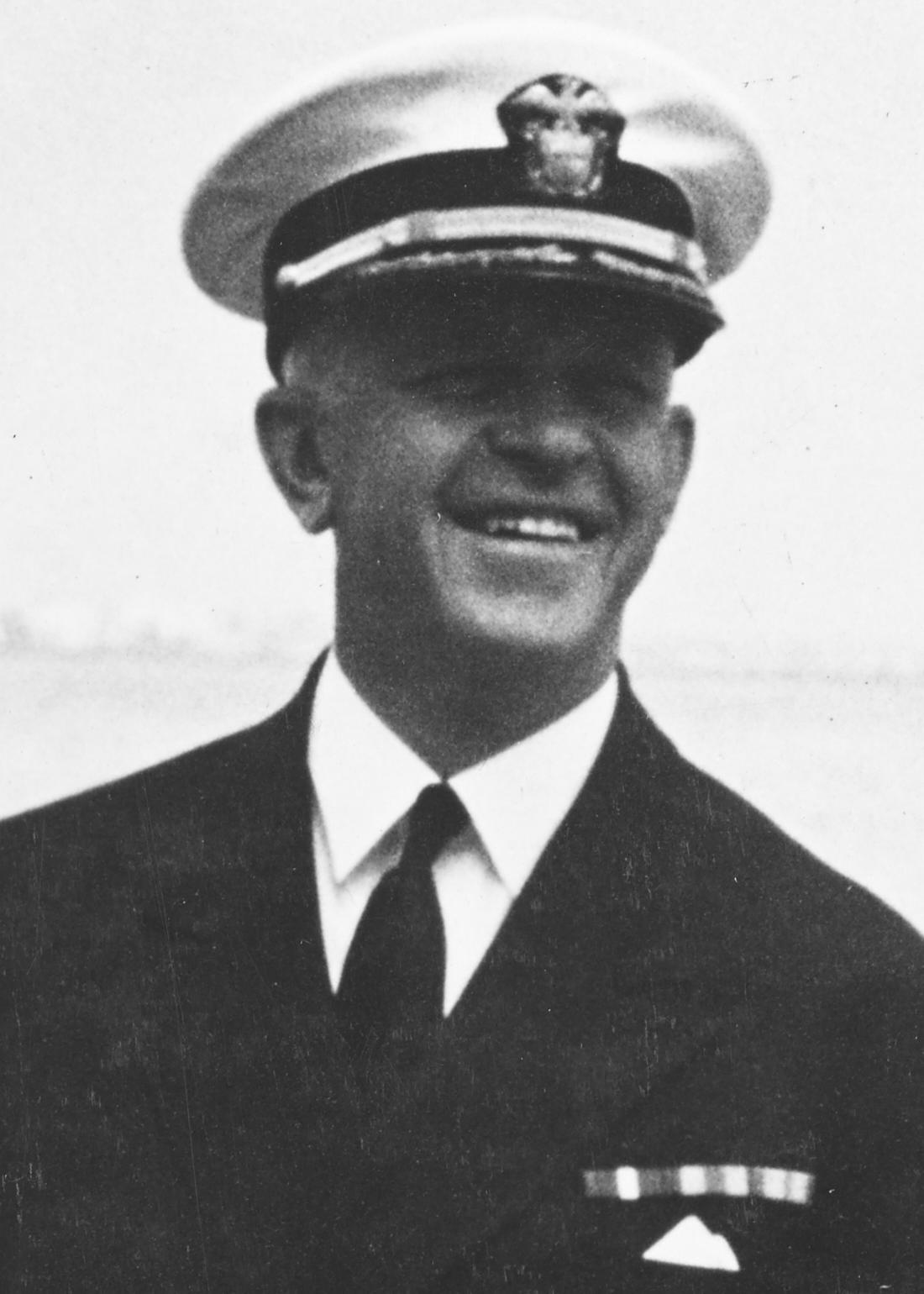
- Captain Leigh Noyes in 1937
- Born: December 15, 1885; St. Johnsbury, Vermont, U.S.
- Died: March 24, 1961 (aged 75); Washington, D.C., U.S.
- Burial place: Arlington National Cemetery
- Military career
- Allegiance: United States of America
- Branch: United States Navy
- Service years: 1906–1946
- Rank: Vice Admiral
- Commands: Director of Naval Communications; Task Force 61
- Conflicts: World War I World War II
- Awards: Navy Cross; Legion of Merit

Leigh Noyes (December 15, 1885 – March 24, 1961) was a vice admiral in the United States Navy during World War II. He was Director of Naval Communications before the outbreak of World War II and later served as commander, Carrier Division 3 and commander, Naval Air Force, Pacific Fleet.

== Biography ==
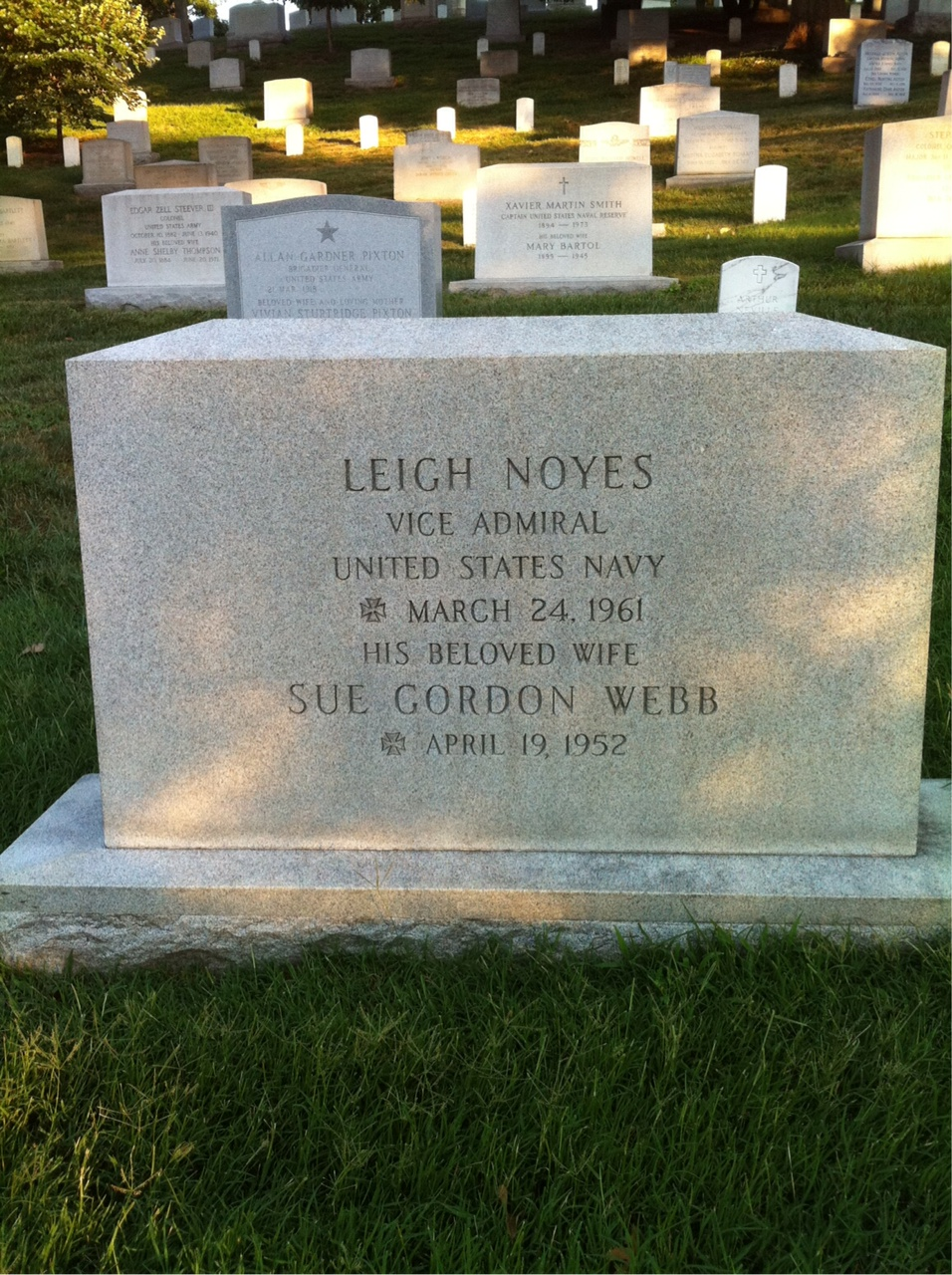
Grave at Arlington National Cemetery

He graduated from the U.S. Naval Academy in 1906, and received the Navy Cross while serving as flag secretary and fleet communication officer of the Atlantic Fleet during World War I. He was also decorated with the Russian Order of Saint Stanislaus, 3rd Class for saving Russian refugees from a sinking boat in the Black Sea.

In 1934, he took over command of the USS Richmond. In 1937 he completed flight training and took command of USS Lexington. In 1938, he was became chief of staff, aircraft, Battle Force.

In 1939, he became Director of Naval Communications at Navy HQ in Washington with the rank of Rear Admiral. After Pearl Harbor, was accused of not passing along the "Bomb Plot" intercept of 9 October 1941, which indicated that the Japanese Consulate in Honolulu was under instructions to report ship locations in Pearl Harbor. In March 1942, he was sent to the Pacific, to serve as Admiral William Halsey's shore administrator in Hawaii for Carrier Division 2 and Aircraft Battle Force.

In May 1942, Halsey became ill and had to give up command with the battle of Midway imminent. Noyes was expected to replace Halsey, but on Halsey's recommendation, Admiral Raymond A. Spruance was selected instead to command Task Force 16, while Admiral Frank Jack Fletcher took overall command. Noyes remained in Hawaii.

In June 1942, Noyes was given command of Task Force 18, with his flag in USS Wasp, newly arrived in the Pacific.

In August 1942, Noyes with TF 18 joined TF 61 for Operation WATCHTOWER, the invasion of Guadalcanal, providing air cover and strikes on ground targets. TF 18 was detached for refueling and missed the Battle of the Eastern Solomons on 24 August.

Wasp was torpedoed and sunk by a Japanese submarine on 14 September, and Noyes was criticized for the loss. It was asserted that the course he had Wasp follow exposed her to such attack.

Noyes was reassigned as commander, Naval Air Force, Pacific Fleet, which he held until October 1942. He did not receive another sea command.

In 1945 he was appointed to the position of president, Board of Inspection and Survey, serving until 1946 when he retired. He was promoted to vice admiral in the retired list in 1950.

== Decorations ==
Ribbon bar of Vice Admiral Leigh Noyes:

Naval Aviator Badge
1st Row	Navy Cross		Legion of Merit with Combat "V"
2nd Row	World War I Victory Medal with Atlantic Fleet Clasp	American Defense Service Medal	Asiatic-Pacific Campaign Medal with three service stars
3rd Row	American Campaign Medal	World War II Victory Medal	Russian Order of Saint Stanislaus, 3rd Class

Military offices
Preceded by Charles E. Courtney	Director of Naval Communications; June 1939 – February 1942	Succeeded by Joseph R. Redman
