= John R. Redman =

US Navy admiral (1898–1970)

John Roland Redman
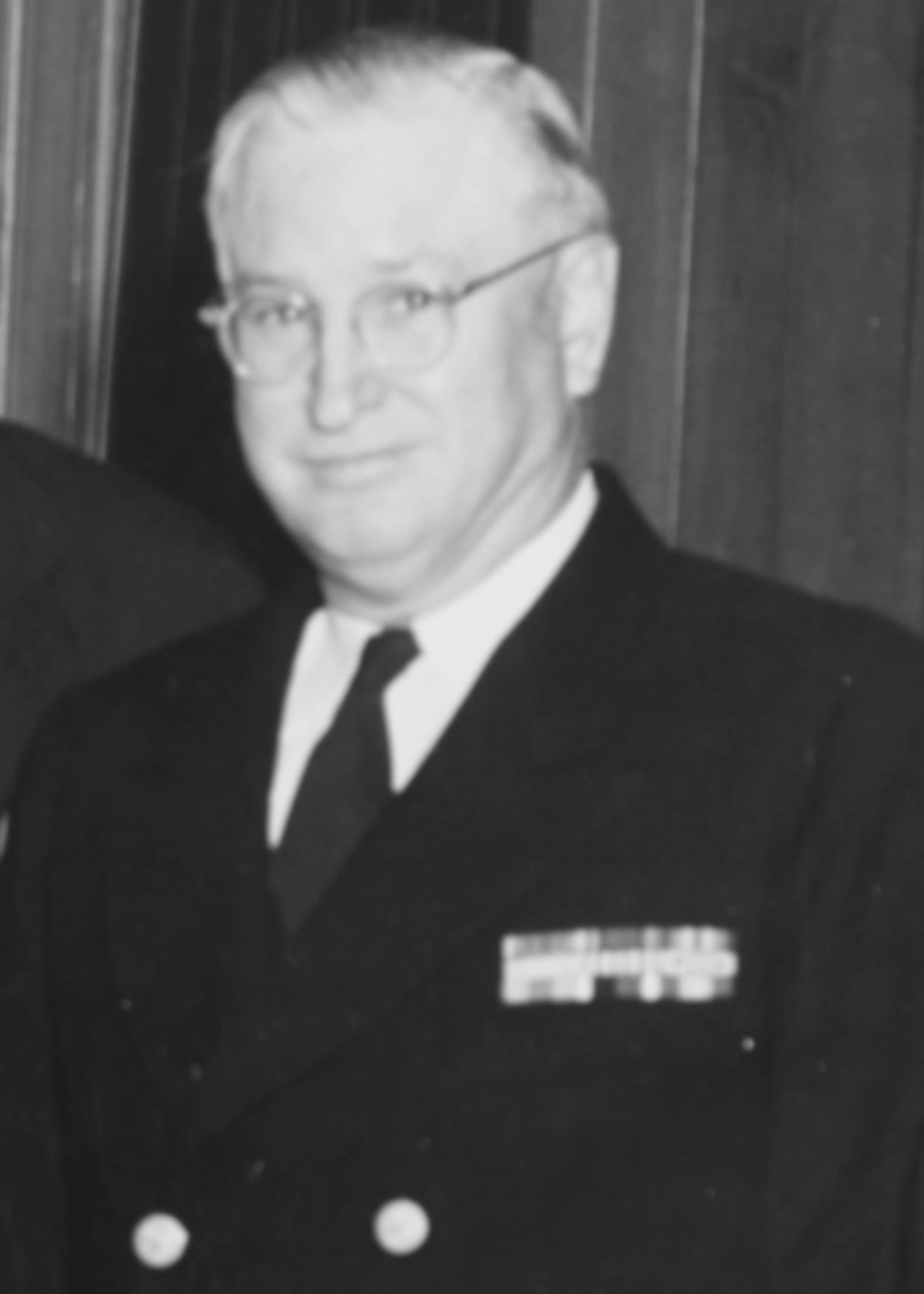
- Rear Admiral John Redman in 1956
- Born: January 31, 1898; Reno, Nevada, U.S.
- Died: May 29, 1970 (aged 72); San Francisco, California, U.S.
- Relatives: RADM Joseph Redman, USN (brother)
- Military career
- Allegiance: United States of America
- Branch: United States Navy
- Service years: 1919–1957
- Rank: Vice Admiral
- Commands: Director of Naval Communications
- Conflicts: World War I World War II
- Awards: Legion of Merit (3); Navy Commendation Medal

John "Jack" Roland Redman (January 31, 1898 – May 29, 1970) was an admiral in the United States Navy. A naval communications officer, he played key roles in signals intelligence during World War II in Washington, D.C., and on the staff of Admiral Chester W. Nimitz. He also competed at the 1920 Summer Olympics.

== Biography ==
A native of Reno, Nevada, he graduated from the United States Naval Academy in June 1918 with the class of 1919. He was a member of the United States Olympic Team, participating as a wrestler in the 1920 games. He was the brother of Joseph Redman, also a naval communications officer. He reached the active rank of Rear Admiral in March 1944. In February 1942, with the reorganization and centralization in Washington of U.S. Navy signals intelligence, he was put in charge of OP-20-G, the section of naval communications responsible for cryptanalysis.

John Redman served as the Communications Officer on the staff of the Commander-in-Chief, United States Pacific Fleet, Admiral Chester Nimitz, from October 1942 to March 1945. During Redman's tenure his actions were criticised. Redman rejected Captain Joseph Rochefort's accurate analysis of the intercepted Japanese messages that ultimately led to the successful Battle of Midway, and he subsequently played a role in Rochefort's ejection from cryptanalysis in the months that followed. His organisation's intentional withholding of intercepts and tips from the British, Indian and New Zealand allies and the US Army, who were also working on the decryption of other Japanese codebooks, was considered to have collectively held them all back. Information was shared between organizations only after the intervention of his brother Admiral Joe Redman in September 1943.

On May 2, 1945, he assumed command of the battleship USS Massachusetts (BB-59), which he held through the end of the war. From August 1949 to September 1951, he was the Director of Naval Communications in the Office of the Chief of Naval Operations, United States Navy. Subsequently, he served as Director of Communications-Electronics for the Joint Chiefs of Staff in Washington, D.C. His final tour was as Commandant, Twelfth Naval District, from 1954 to 1957. He retired from the Navy on October 1, 1957, with the rank of Vice Admiral. He is buried in Arlington National Cemetery.
