= Earl E. Stone =

American Rear admiral

Earl Everett Stone
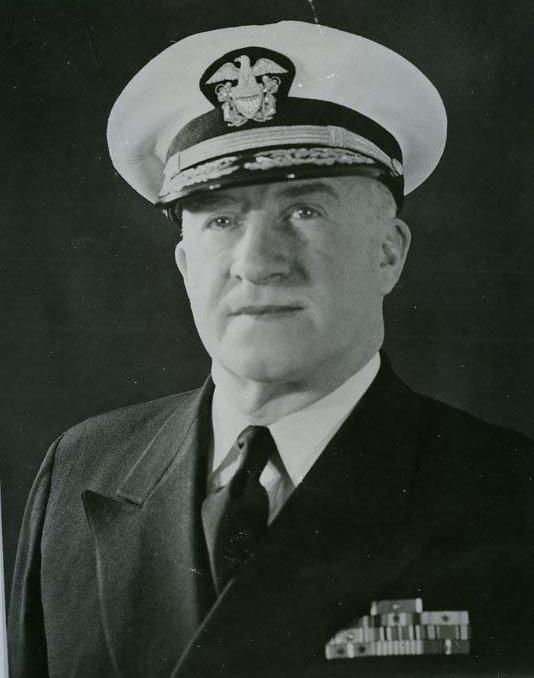
- RAdm Stone during the Cold War Era.
- Born: December 2, 1895; Milwaukee, Wisconsin, U.S.
- Died: September 24, 1989 (aged 93); Carmel-by-the-Sea, California, U.S.
- Burial place: Rock Creek Cemetery; Washington, D.C., U.S.
- Military career
- Allegiance: United States
- Branch: United States Navy
- Service years: 1917–1958
- Rank: Rear admiral
- Nickname: "Stoney"
- Commands: Armed Forces Security Agency; Naval Postgraduate School; USS Wisconsin
- Conflicts: World War I World War II: Attack on Pearl Harbor; Philippines Campaign; Battle of Iwo Jima; Battle of Okinawa; Korean War
- Awards: Legion of Merit (3)

Earl Everett Stone (December 2, 1895 – September 24, 1989) was a rear admiral in the United States Navy. He is most noted for being the first director of the Armed Forces Security Agency, the predecessor to the National Security Agency.

== Early career ==
Earl Everett Stone was born on December 2, 1895, in Milwaukee, Wisconsin, the son of Thomas Hector and Catherine Agnes Stone. He graduated from high school and received an appointment to the United States Naval Academy at Annapolis, Maryland, in July 1914. While at the Academy, Stone was nicknamed "Stoney" and was active in the crew. As midshipman, he also participated in the voyage aboard the battleship USS Ohio through the recently opened Panama Canal in July 1915.

His course was shortened due to the course of World War I and he graduated on June 29, 1917, with a Bachelor of Science degree. He was subsequently commissioned ensign and following the basic training, he was attached to the protected cruiser USS Cleveland. Stone participated in the convoy escort duty in the Atlantic Ocean and was promoted to the temporary rank of lieutenant (junior grade) on October 15, 1917, and to the temporary rank of lieutenant on February 1, 1918.

Following the War, Stone was ordered back to the United States and transferred to the Pacific Fleet headquarters in March 1919 as aide and radio officer to Commander Base Force, Pacific Fleet, Rear Admiral Spencer S. Wood. While in this capacity, he was promoted to the permanent rank of lieutenant on July 1, 1920. His sea duty ended in June 1923, when he was ordered for instruction at the Naval Postgraduate School, then part of the Naval Academy at Annapolis.

Stone completed the course in Communication Engineering in August 1924 and entered Harvard University the following month. He graduated with a master's degree in October 1925 and was attached to the battleship USS California. After a few months aboard that vessel, serving with the Battle Fleet in the Pacific Ocean, he joined the Staff, Battle Division 4, Battle Fleet under Rear Admiral Jehu V. Chase and remained in that assignment until August 1928.

He was subsequently ordered to Washington, D.C., where he joined the Office of the Naval Communications in the Office of the Chief of Naval Operations under Rear Admiral Thomas T. Craven. While in this capacity, he was promoted to lieutenant commander on June 5, 1930, and joined the staff of Commander-in-Chief, United States Fleet under his old superior Admiral Jehu V. Chase three months later.

Stone later served for a brief period aboard the light cruiser USS Cincinnati and returned to the Office of the Naval Communications within the Office of Chief of Naval Operations in June 1933. He later commanded the destroyer USS Long from June 1935 and the destroyer USS Aylwin several months later.

Upon promotion to commander on September 1, 1937, Stone returned again to the Office of the Naval Communications. He was transferred to the Navy Department in June 1938 and served as Communications War Plans Officer until February 1941, when he was appointed executive officer aboard the battleship USS California under Captain Joel W. Bunkley.

== World War II ==
During the time of the Japanese Attack on Pearl Harbor, Stone was aboard the California during the attack, when the ship was severely damaged and sank in the shallow water. He then served for a brief period as executive officer of the cruiser USS Salt Lake City under Captain Ellis M. Zacharias, before he was ordered to New York Navy Yard for duty as Communications Officer on the staff of the Eastern Sea Frontier under Vice Admiral Adolphus Andrews.

In October 1942, Stone was transferred to Washington, D.C., and attached to the Office of the Naval Communications under Captain Carl F. Holden for duty as Assistant Director of Naval Communications for Communication Intelligence and Head, Communication Intelligence Organization – the forerunner organization of the Naval Security Group. During Stone's tenure, the OP-20-G was moved from the old Navy building on the Mall to its new home at 3801 Nebraska Avenue. For his service in Washington, D.C., Stone was decorated with the Legion of Merit.

Stone was ordered back to sea duty in mid-March 1944, when he was appointed commanding officer of the newly commissioned battleship USS Wisconsin at Norfolk Navy Yard. He commanded the initial training at Chesapeake Bay and then led Wisconsin during her shakedown cruise to Trinidad in July that year. After a period of alterations and repairs at the builder's yard, Wisconsin sailed for Hawaii in October 1944.

He successfully commanded the ship during Typhoon Cobra in December 1944 and participated in the naval operations during the Philippines Campaign in early 1945. Stone then commanded Wisconsin during the Battle of Iwo Jima in February 1945, when his ship covered the Allied landing. He was succeeded by John W. Roper at the beginning of March and assumed duty as Assistant Chief of Staff for Communications on the staff of Commander-in-Chief, Pacific Fleet, Fleet Admiral Chester Nimitz.

While in this capacity, he was promoted to the temporary rank of commodore on April 3, 1945, and took part in the Battle of Okinawa. Stone remained in that assignment until the beginning of September 1945 and received his second Legion of Merit for his service with Pacific Fleet.

== Postwar service ==
=== Armed Forces Defense Agency ===
Following his return to the United States, Stone was appointed Director of Naval Communications and promoted to rear admiral on January 8, 1946. While in this capacity, he was appointed the chairman of a Department of Defense committee known as "Stone Board", which was appointed to make recommendations for reforming and reorganizing cryptological activities. The Army supported consolidation, but the Navy and Air Force opposed unification. In December 1948, the Stone Board issued a report that recommended maintaining the status quo. A few months later, with the advent of a new Secretary of Defense, Louis A. Johnson, and a change of position by the Air Force, the Navy grudgingly went along with the unification concept.

In May 1949, all cryptological activities were centralized under a national organization called the Armed Forces Security Agency (AFSA) and Stone was appointed its first director. This organization was originally established within the U.S. Department of Defense under the command of the Joint Chiefs of Staff. The AFSA was tasked to direct Department of Defense communications and electronic intelligence activities, except those of U.S. military intelligence units.

=== Later service ===
Stone remained in that office until July 1951, when he was ordered to the Far East for duty as Commander Cruiser Division ONE and as Commander Task Group 77.1. He led his command during the naval operations off the coast of Korea until June 1952 and received a Legion of Merit with Combat "V" for his service.

He was then ordered to Paris, France, for duty as director of communications at the U.S. European Command Headquarters under General Matthew Ridgway. While in this capacity, Stone assisted in the training of the French Navy and was made Officer of the Legion of Honour by the Government of France.

In 1953, Stone returned to the United States and was appointed commander, Training Command, U.S. Pacific Fleet. He spent two years in this assignment and assumed his final duty as superintendent of the Naval Postgraduate School at Monterey, California, in 1955. He participated in the official visit to Peru and received the Grand Cross of the Order of the Peruvian Cross of Naval Merit.

== Retirement ==
Stone retired from the Navy on January 1, 1958, after forty years of active service and settled in Monterey, California. He eventually became the director of the Allen Knight Maritime Museum, which is dedicated to preserving the old fishing and whaling days in Monterey.

Rear Admiral Earl E. Stone died on September 24, 1989, aged 93 at his home in Carmel-by-the-Sea, California, and was buried at Rock Creek Cemetery in Washington, D.C. His wife Eleanor Newton Pritchard is buried beside him. They had one daughter, Dr. Ellen Newton Stone Haring.

== Decorations ==
Here is the ribbon bar of Rear Admiral Earl E. Stone:

1st Row	Legion of Merit with two Gold Stars and "V" Device		
2nd Row	Navy Unit Commendation	World War I Victory Medal with Escort clasp	American Defense Service Medal with Fleet Clasp
3rd Row	American Campaign Medal	Asiatic-Pacific Campaign Medal with silver service star	World War II Victory Medal
4th Row	National Defense Service Medal	Korean Service Medal with two Service stars	United Nations Korea Medal
5th Row	Philippine Liberation Medal with two bronze stars	Legion of Honour, rank Officer (France)	Grand Cross of the Order of the Peruvian Cross of Naval Merit
