= Samuel W. Bryant =

American admiral

Samuel Wood Bryant
- Born: May 24, 1877; Washington, Pennsylvania, U.S.
- Died: November 4, 1938 (aged 61); Asheville, North Carolina, U.S.
- Military career
- Allegiance: United States of America
- Branch: United States Navy
- Service years: 1900–1937
- Rank: Rear Admiral
- Conflicts: Spanish–American War; World War I
- Awards: Navy Cross

Samuel Wood Bryant (May 24, 1877 – November 4, 1938) was an admiral in the United States Navy.

== Biography ==
Bryant was born in Washington, Pennsylvania, on May 24, 1877. He attended Bryant School and the Pittsburgh Academy (the predecessor of the University of Pittsburgh) before receiving an appointment to the United States Naval Academy in May 1893. Though he resigned the appointment soon thereafter, Bryant secured another in 1896 and returned to the Naval Academy to complete the course. In June 1898, while still a naval cadet, he was assigned to USS Massachusetts (BB-2) of Admiral William T. Sampson's Atlantic Squadron, taking part in the bombardments of Santiago de Cuba on May 31 and June 6 and in other engagements in the West Indies during the Spanish–American War. He also served on USS Leyden before returning to the Naval Academy.

Graduating in June 1900, he then served the two years at sea as required by law at the time before being commissioned as an ensign. During that interval, he served briefly on USS New York (ACR-2) before reporting on board the converted yacht USS Yankton on September 1. About a year later, he left Yankton for duty on USS Illinois (BB-7). It was late in this assignment, on August 7, 1902, that Bryant received his commission as an ensign. On September 19, 1902, he was detached from Illinois for a short tour of duty as a watch and division on board USS Nashville (PG-7). That assignment concluded with the year and Ens. Bryant transferred to USS Machias (PG-5) on December 30, 1902, and remained there until April 1904. Thereafter, until October 1907, he did successive duty on board USS Marblehead (C-11) and USS Preble (DD-12) and finally as navigator of USS Lawton and USS Buffalo. While serving on Preble, he was promoted to lieutenant (junior grade) on August 21, 1905 and to full lieutenant on September 11, 1905.

In the fall of 1907, Lt. Bryant returned to the Naval Academy as a navigation instructor and remained there almost three years. After being detached in June 1910, he joined USS Nebraska (BB-14). On October 28, 1912, at the rank of lieutenant commander, he assumed command of Yankton, where he remained until May 31, 1913. Ordered to the Naval War College in Newport, Rhode Island, he pursued the short course until October 4 when he transferred to the Naval Radio Station in Norfolk, Virginia. There, he took up duty as assistant to the superintendent on November 10. He next fitted out and assumed command of USS Allen (DD-66) at her commissioning on January 24, 1917.

Continuing in command of Allen after the United States entered World War I in April 1917, Bryant was promoted to commander on June 22, 1917. In December 1917, however, he was appointed an aide on the staff of the Commander, U.S. Destroyer Flotillas Operating in European Waters. He served in that capacity until mid-August 1918, whereupon he was promoted to captain on August 15, 1918. Capt. Bryant returned to the United States to fit out USS Gamble (DD-123). On November 4, 1918, he was appointed to command the destroyers based at Naval Station Norfolk, which he did until February 7, 1919, when he was transferred to command of Flotilla B and destroyers based at Naval Station Charleston.

In June of that year Capt. Bryant received orders to Washington, D.C. for duty in the Office of the Chief of Naval Operations with the Director of Naval Communications. He left that office at the beginning of June 1922 to take command of Division 39, Destroyer Squadrons, Atlantic Fleet, with additional duty as the commanding officer of USS McCormick (DD-223), positions which he held for 17 months. In addition, he left these assignments temporarily in December 1922 to serve as an assistant to the naval advisor to the American delegate to the International Commission on the Rules of Warfare at the Hague in the Netherlands.

Returning to Division 39 and McCormick early in 1923, he resumed those commands until the following fall. Detached from Division 39 on November 17, Capt. Bryant went back to the Office of Naval Communications, where he served as assistant director from December 11, 1923 to May 31, 1924. He then returned to the Naval War College, and, after completing the course in May 1925, served on the staff there until July 1926. After that, he went to sea again, commanding USS Detroit (CL-8) for two years, before starting another tour of duty on the Naval War College staff in July 1928.

In June 1930, he became chief of staff to the Commander, Scouting Fleet. During the 24 months in which he served in that position, Scouting Fleet was redesignated Scouting Force. Detached early in the summer of 1932, he reported for duty in the Office of the Chief of Naval Operations on July 7, 1932, as officer-in-charge of the War Plans Division. Near the end of that assignment, on February 18, 1934, he was promoted to rear admiral. In July 1934, RAdm. Bryant received orders to break his flag afloat as the Commander, Battleship Division 2, Battle Force, and did so on September 4, 1934. He remained so employed until March 30, 1935, when he became chief of staff to the Commander in Chief, United States Fleet, in which capacity he served until August 29, 1935.

Hospitalized for more than a year, he was discharged from the Naval Hospital, San Diego, on December 15, 1936, and, on March 1, 1937, was transferred to the retired list by reason of physical disability. RAdm. Bryant died in Asheville, North Carolina, on November 4, 1938, and was buried in Arlington National Cemetery on November 7, 1938.

== Namesake ==
In 1943, the destroyer USS Bryant (DD-665) was named in his honor.
