= Joseph Redman =

United States Navy admiral (1891–1968)

Joseph Reasor Redman
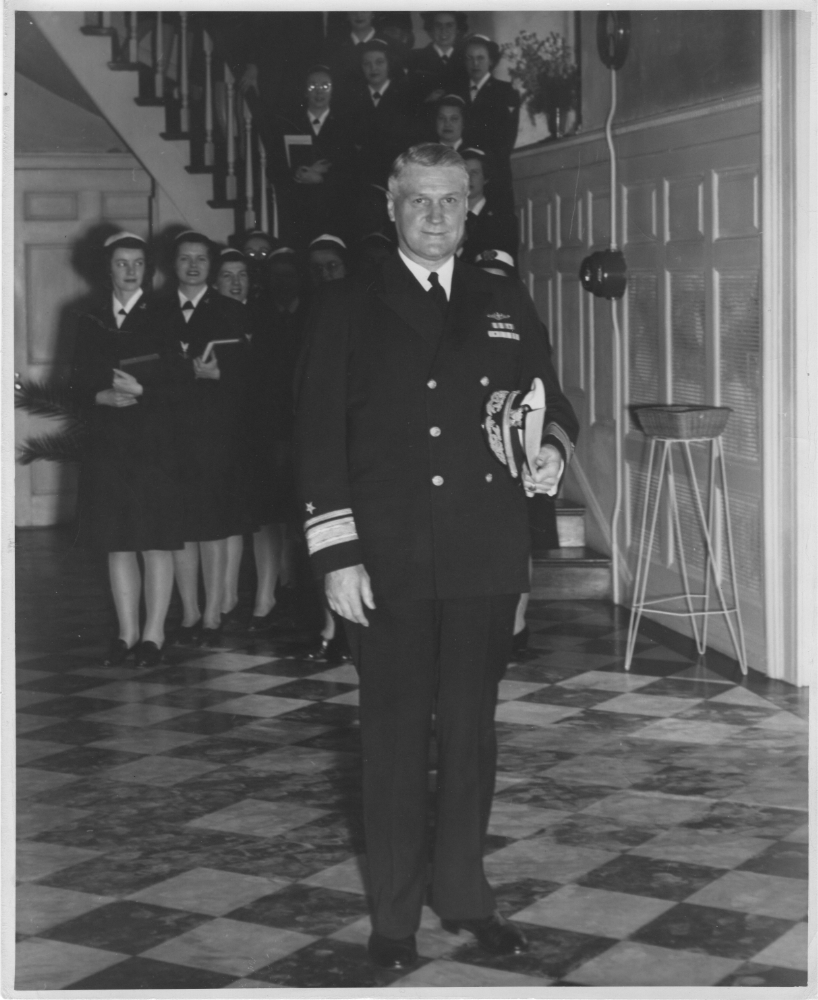
- Born: April 17, 1891; Grass Valley, California, U.S.
- Died: September 7, 1968 (aged 77)
- Relatives: VADM John R. Redman, USN (brother)
- Military career
- Allegiance: United States of America
- Branch: United States Navy
- Service years: 1914-1946
- Rank: Rear Admiral
- Commands: Director of Naval Communications
- Conflicts: World War I World War II
- Awards: Distinguished Service Medal

Joseph Reasor Redman (April 17, 1891 – September 7, 1968) was an admiral in the United States Navy. A naval communications officer, he played key roles in signals intelligence during World War II, while he served as Director of Naval Communications.

== Biography ==
Redman graduated from the United States Naval Academy in 1914. He was the brother of John R. Redman, also a prominent naval communications officer. Joseph Redman commanded the USS Tuscaloosa from December 1939 to May 1940. On December 7, 1941, he was serving as the assistant to Rear Admiral Leigh Noyes, the Director of Naval Communications. Following the reorganization of naval communications in February 1942 and the departure of Noyes, Redman succeeded him as DNC until September 1942. Redman then went to the South Pacific to command the USS Phoenix until returning as DNC in an unusual second tour, from April 1943 to August 1945. He retired with the rank of Rear Admiral and for his service as Director of Naval Communications, he was decorated with Navy Distinguished Service Medal. Rear Admiral Joseph R. Redman died on September 7, 1968, and is buried at Arlington National Cemetery.

Every year the Admiral Joseph R. Redman Award is given to the midshipman of the graduating class at the United States Naval Academy who has "demonstrated the greatest achievement in the professional courses in Electrical Fundamentals and Applications" and is nominated by the Electrical Engineering Department.

== Redman brothers ==
After the war the roles of Admiral Redman and his brother John R. Redman during the war became controversial especially pertaining to the gathering of information prior to the Battle of Midway. Despite their claim that John Redman's unit in Washington had been instrumental in developing the intelligence that led to the successful battle, it now appeared that in fact Redman and his people had drawn the wrong conclusions. The real work was done by the cryptanalyst team at Pearl Harbor under the direction of Joseph Rochefort. After the battle the Redmans claimed the credit and used their influence to destroy Rochefort's career. This is further supported in detail by Stephen Budiansky. Redman's intelligence failures for the Battle of Midway, which included failure to identify the Japanese objectives and the date of their operation, are described in the memoirs of Rear Admiral Edwin Layton, who was Admiral Nimitz' intelligence chief throughout the Pacific War

Military offices
Preceded by Carl Frederick Holden	Director of Naval Communications; April 1943– August 1945	Succeeded by Earl E. Stone
