= Jonas H. Ingram =

US Navy admiral and Medal of Honor recipient (1886–1952)

Jonas Howard Ingram
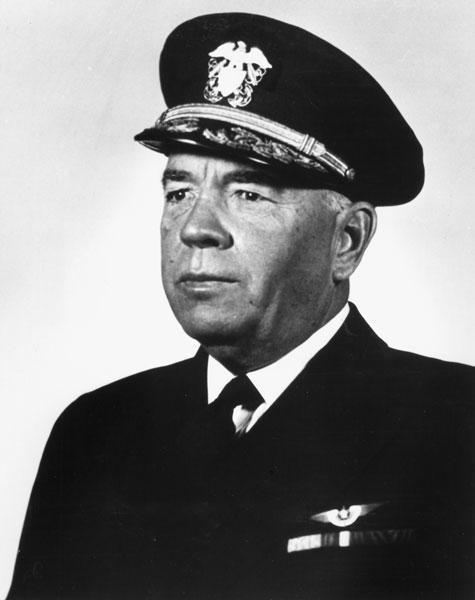
- Born: October 15, 1887; Jeffersonville, Indiana, U.S.
- Died: September 9, 1952 (aged 64); San Diego, California, U.S.
- Burial place: Arlington National Cemetery
- Military career
- Allegiance: United States
- Branch: United States Navy
- Service years: 1903–1947
- Rank: Admiral
- Commands: United States Atlantic Fleet; South Atlantic Force; Task Force Three; USS Tennessee (BB-43); Destroyer Squadron Six; USS Pennsylvania (BB-38); USS Stoddert (DD-302)
- Conflicts: Mexican Revolution: Battle of Vera Cruz; World War I: Battle of the Atlantic; World War II: Battle of the Atlantic; Operation Teardrop
- Awards: Medal of Honor; Navy Cross; Navy Distinguished Service Medal (3); Purple Heart

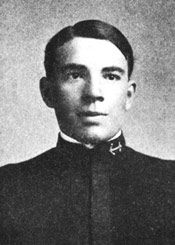
Jonas H. Ingram as a United States Naval Academy midshipman

Jonas Howard Ingram (October 15, 1887 – September 9, 1952) was an officer in the United States Navy during World War I and World War II. He commanded the United States Atlantic Fleet during World War II and was a recipient of the Medal of Honor for his actions in 1914 in Veracruz, Mexico.

A noteworthy football player during his collegiate years, Ingram is remembered as the second commissioner of the All-America Football Conference (AAFC), a professional American football league launched in 1946 and terminated in 1950 with the absorption of three teams into the rival National Football League. Ingram was appointed to the position in 1947 and resigned in 1949.

== Early life and sports ==
=== Playing career ===
In his youth, Ingram attended Jeffersonville High School and Culver Military Academy in Culver, Indiana, then was appointed to the United States Naval Academy in 1903, at the age of 17. He graduated in 1907. During Ingram's time at the academy, he was a member of the school's rowing, track, and football teams, leading the latter team to the Midshipmen's first victory in six years over their bitter rivals from Army by scoring the lone touchdown in the 1906 clash. His athletic exploits helped earn him the academy's prestigious Athletic Sword and induction into the College Football Hall of Fame in 1968.

=== Coaching career ===
As a lieutenant, Ingram was named the 15th head football coach of the United States Naval Academy and he held that position for two seasons, from 1915 until 1916, compiling a record of 9–8–2.

From 1926 through 1930, Ingram was the director of athletics of the Naval Academy. Thereafter he retained a close connection to football by working as a referee at the collegiate and professional level.

== Military career ==
Following his graduation in 1907, Ingram served in several battleships, cruisers and destroyers. As turret officer of the battleship USS Arkansas (BB-33), he established a world's record for firing 12-inch (305 mm) guns. On April 22, 1914, he landed at Veracruz, Mexico with the Arkansas battalion and was later awarded the Medal of Honor for "distinguished conduct in battle" and "skillful and efficient handling of the artillery and machine guns".

=== World War I and interwar years ===
During World War I, Ingram was awarded the Navy Cross for his services on the staff of Rear Admiral Hugh Rodman, Commander, Division Nine, Battle Force, Atlantic Fleet.

Earning the rank of commander in 1924, Ingram became the commanding officer of the destroyer USS Stoddert (DD-302) before returning to the United States Naval Academy to serve as both athletic director and football director from 1926 to 1930.

Ingram moved on to command the battleship USS Pennsylvania (BB-38) for a period of time after that, before serving as Officer-in-Charge of the Public Relations Branch.

Prior to his promotion to captain in 1935, Ingram served as an aide to the Secretary of the Navy, then returned to the sea as commander of Destroyer Squadron Six. Ashore, he was Captain of the Yard, New York Navy Yard in Brooklyn, New York before returning to sea, in command of the battleship USS Tennessee (BB-43).

=== World War II ===
In the early years of World War II, Ingram was promoted to rear admiral on January 10, 1941, and served as Commander Task Force Three prior to his designation in September 1942 as Commander South Atlantic Force, United States Atlantic Fleet, with the rank of vice admiral. This force, with headquarters in Brazil, guarded shipping in the coastal waters south of the Equator and throughout the United States zone of responsibility in the South Atlantic. Ingram's command included air and surface units of Brazil which were brought to a high state of efficiency through his leadership and coordinating efforts. The ability to develop and maintain harmony and close cooperation with Brazilian naval forces contributed to the control of the South Atlantic achieved by the Allies. He assumed personal responsibility for properly equipping and training the Brazilian Navy and for their combat operations against U-Boats and German raiders and later for the important task of maintaining the air and sea rescue patrol for ultimate deployment in the Pacific. For his services in these important commands, he was awarded the Navy Distinguished Service Medal and a gold award star in lieu of a second award.

On November 15, 1944, Ingram was appointed Commander-in-Chief, United States Atlantic Fleet, with the rank of admiral. In this command he played a major role in assuring the steady flow of troops and materials to Europe across the Atlantic during the later phases of World War II. He also directed Atlantic Fleet efforts in containing and destroying the German U-Boat fleet. For exceptionally meritorious service during his command, he was awarded a gold award star in lieu of a third Distinguished Service Medal.

Detached from duty as Commander-in-Chief, United States Atlantic Fleet, during September 1946, he subsequently retired from active duty on April 1, 1947, after 44 years of service.

== Football commissioner ==
In February 1947 Ingram was named commissioner of the All-America Football Conference (AAFC), replacing Jim Crowley. The post carried with it an annual salary of $30,000 — approximately $470,000 in the 2023 equivalent.

Serving until resigning in 1949, Ingram went on to serve as a vice president for the Reynolds Metals Company.

== Death and legacy ==
In August 1952, Ingram suffered a heart attack while serving as the superintendent of summer schools at Culver Academies, then was stricken again with another attack on September 9, while at the United States Naval Hospital in San Diego, California. He died the following evening.

Admiral Ingram and his wife Jean Fletcher (1892–1954) are buried at Arlington National Cemetery, in Arlington, Virginia.

== Medal of Honor citation ==
Rank and organization: Lieutenant, Junior Grade, U.S. Navy. Born: October 15, 1886, Jeffersonville, Ind. Accredited to: Indiana. G.O. No.: 177, December 4, 1915.

Citation

For distinguished conduct in battle, engagement of Vera Cruz, 22 April 1914. During the second day's fighting the service performed by him was eminent and conspicuous. He was conspicuous for skillful and efficient handling of the artillery and machineguns of the Arkansas battalion, for which he was specially commended in reports.

== Additional awards ==
- Medal of Honor
- Navy Cross
- Navy Distinguished Service Medal with two award stars
- Purple Heart (for wounds received during an encounter with a German submarine "wolf-pack" in 1942)
- Mexican Service Medal
- World War I Victory Medal (United States) with "Grand Fleet" clasp
- American Defense Service Medal with bronze "A" device
- American Campaign Medal
- European-African-Middle Eastern Campaign Medal
- World War II Victory Medal

Ingram also held the following foreign decorations: Order of the Southern Cross (Brazil); Grand Officer of the Order of Military Merit (Brazil); Order of Naval Merit (Brazil); Order of Aeronautical Merit, Degree of Grand Officer (Brazil); Order of Leopold II (Belgium); and Knight Commander of the Order of the British Empire (Great Britain).

== Legacy ==
The destroyer Jonas Ingram (DD-938), commissioned in 1957, was named in his honor.

== Head coaching record ==
| Year | Team | Overall | Conference | Standing | Bowl/playoffs |
|---|---|---|---|---|---|
Navy Midshipmen (Independent) (1915–1916)
| 1915 | Navy | 3–5–1 | | | |
| 1916 | Navy | 6–3–1 | | | |
| Navy: | | 9–8–2 | | | |
| Total: | | 9–8–2 | | | |

== See also ==
- List of Medal of Honor recipients (Veracruz)
