= Fleet problem =

Series of US naval exercises in the interwar period

United States Navy Fleet Problems
- 1922–1940
Washington Naval Treaty	United States Navy in World War II
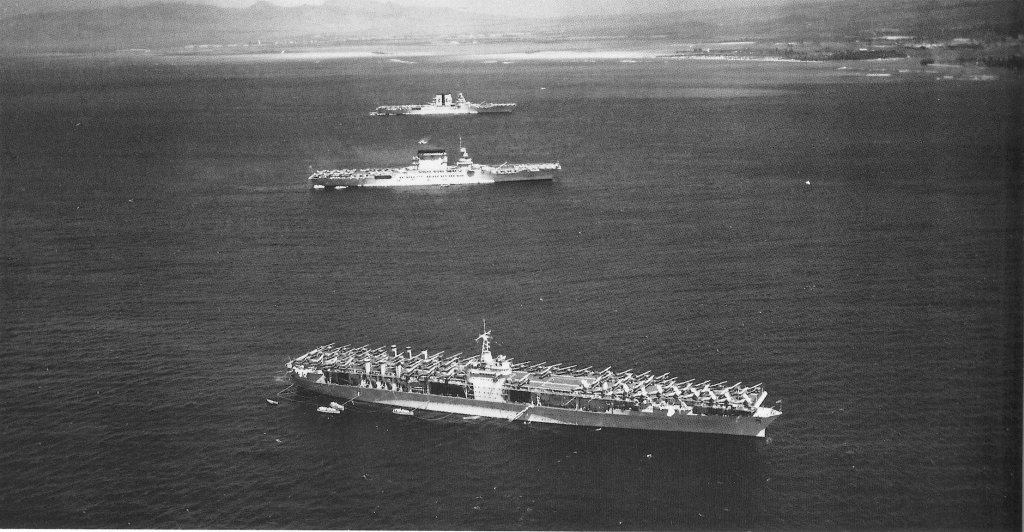
- USS Ranger (CV-4), USS Lexington (CV-2) and USS Saratoga (CV-3) at anchor off Honolulu on 8 April 1938, during Fleet Problem XIX
- Location: Pacific Ocean, Atlantic Ocean, Panama Canal Zone

The Fleet Problems were a series of United States Navy exercises conducted in the interwar period, later resurrected by the United States Pacific Fleet around 2016.

The first twenty-one Fleet Problems — labeled by Navy leadership as Fleet Problem I through Fleet Problem XXI — were conducted between 1923 and 1940. The culmination of the Navy's annual training maneuvers, they were unscripted, free play exercises involving large concentrations of ships, airplanes, and troops. Fleet Problem XXII, scheduled for 1941, was canceled because of rising tensions with Japan on the eve of the US's entry into World War II. Following the outbreak of war, Fleet Problems underwent a prolonged hiatus, with other names being used to describe large American naval exercises. However, the term was revived in the 21st century, beginning with Fleet Problem XXIII in the Pacific in 2016. Since 2018, the US Navy has not publicly used the historical roman numeral numbering scheme.

== Interwar Fleet Problems ==
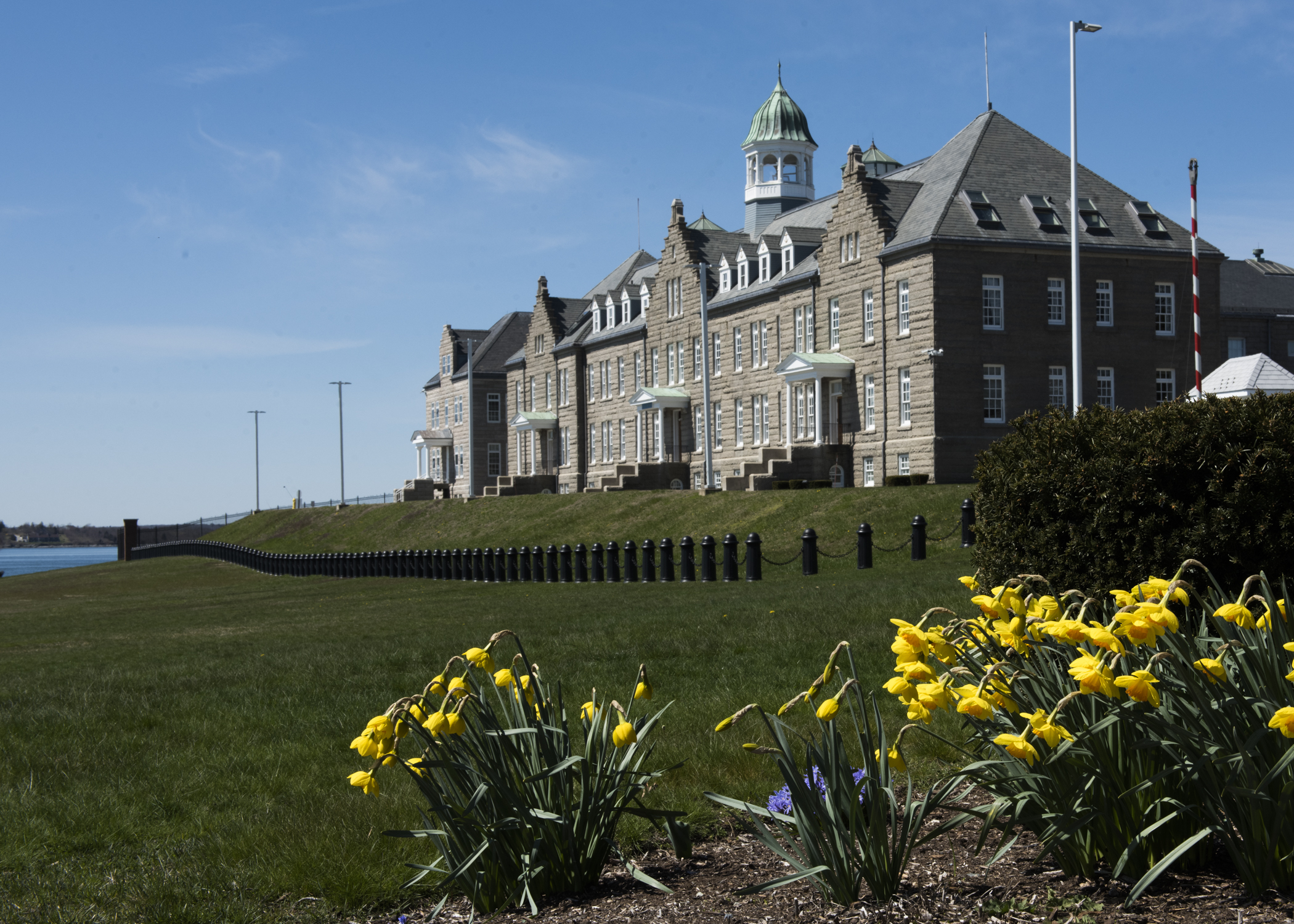
The Naval War College, incubator for much of the US Navy's reform movement in the late 19th and early 20th century.

The Fleet problems of the 1920s and 1930s were an evolutionary step from existing fleet training exercises. In the 1870s and 1880s, the US Navy was heavily influenced by a reform movement, championed by progressive officers like Admiral William Sims, Admiral Stephen Luce, and Alfred Thayer Mahan. This generation of reform-oriented officers sought to grow the US Navy into a credible battle fleet, which required improving the Navy's equipment, personnel, and training. This movement prompted the creation of the United States Naval Institute in 1873 and the Naval War College in 1884, which both became intellectual hubs for further reform. Modern shipbuilding began in 1882, replacing the largely decrepit wooden-hulled ships built during and after the Civil War with new, steel-hulled vessels, beginning with USS Dolphin. Finally, after the number of modern warships increased throughout the 1880s, large-scale fleet exercises began in 1889. Large-scale exercises continued on a regular basis until the United States entered World War I in 1917. The US Navy again held a large exercise in 1921, but remained administratively divided into Pacific and Atlantic Fleets until the creation of the United States Fleet in 1922. This large concentration of peacetime forces under a unified staff and commander (a position known as the Commander-in-Chief, US Fleet, or CINCUS), Admiral Hilary P. Jones, set the stage for the mass exercises that would become known as fleet problems.

=== Fleet Problem I ===
Diagram of maneuvers during Fleet Problem I

From their first announcement, the fleet problems were national news. On 25 December 1922, the New York Times reported about the upcoming exercises for the first time, proclaiming that "all eighteen of the battleships which the United States Government is permitted to retain by the five-power naval treaty will be engaged in these manoeuvres, representing an aggregate of 500,650 tons."

Fleet Problem I was held off the coast of Panama in February and March 1923. 165 ships and nearly 40,000 men, sailing from both coasts of the United States, participated in the exercise. The United States Battle Fleet, which constituted the attacking Black force, was tasked with attacking the Panama Canal. Shortly after the ships of the United States Scouting Fleet—which, playing the Blue Force, was tasked to defend the Panama Canal—transited the canal into the Pacific, Black Force launched a simulated air raid. Two battleships, USS New York (BB-34) and USS Oklahoma (BB-37) simulated aircraft carriers modeled after the under-construction USS Langley (CV-1). A single plane launched from Oklahoma—representing a 15-plane squadron—dropped 10 miniature bombs and theoretically "destroyed" the spillway of the Gatun Dam. This trapped the ships of the defending Blue Force in the Gulf of Panama, and allowed the Black Force to make a unopposed surface attack on the coast, ending the fleet problem. The exercise ended with a gunnery exercise, with the fleet sinking the pre-dreadnought battleship USS Iowa. Fleet Problem I was widely regarded as a success, including by members of Congress and reporters who had observed the fleets in action, setting the stage for a repeated experimentation in future years.

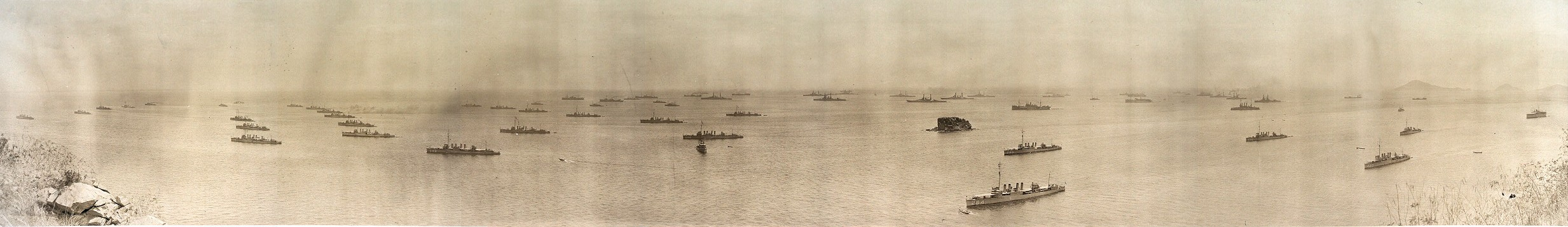
US fleet off the coast of Panama, 1 March 1923

=== Fleet Problems II, III, and IV ===
Fleet Problems II, III, and IV all represented different phases of the same scenario, exploring the initial moves in a notional war against Japan, and took place within the same two months of 1924. These exercises allowed the Army and Navy to validate and practice portions of War Plan Orange, the operations plan for a hypothetical war against Japan in the Pacific, which was formally adopted by the Joint Army and Navy Board later that year.

==== Fleet Problem II ====
Fleet Problem II, which ran from 2 to 15 January, followed the movement of the Battle Fleet, designated as the "Blue Force", from its base on the West Coast to Panama. This was designed to simulate the first leg of an advance from Hawaii towards Asia, especially how well the ships could handle the long transoceanic voyage. During Fleet Problem II, the Navy refined at sea refueling techniques, including refueling side-by-side for the first time between the oiler Cuyama (AO-3) and three other ships.

==== Fleet Problem III and Grand Joint Army-Navy Exercise No. 2 ====
During Fleet Problem III, the Scouting Force, designated the "Black Force," transited from its homeport in the Chesapeake Bay towards the Panama Canal from the Caribbean side. Once in the Caribbean, the naval forces involved in Fleet Problem III joined with the 15th Naval District and the Army's Panama Division in a larger joint exercise. The Blue force defended the canal from an attack from the Caribbean by the Black force, operating from an advance base in the Azores. This portion of the exercise also aimed to practice amphibious landing techniques and transiting a fleet rapidly through the Panama Canal from the Pacific side.

Black Fleet's intelligence officers simulated a number of sabotage operations during the course of Fleet Problem III. On 14 January, Lieutenant Hamilton Bryan, Scouting Force's Intelligence Officer, personally landed in Panama with a small boat. Posing as a journalist, he entered the Panama Canal Zone. There, he "detonated" a series of simulated bombs in the Gatun Locks, control station, and fuel depot, along with simulating sabotaging power lines and communications cables throughout the 16th and 17th, before escaping to his fleet on a sailboat.

On the 15th, one of Bryan's junior officers, Ensign Thomas Hederman, also snuck ashore to the Miraflores Locks. He learned the Blue Fleet's schedule of passage through the Canal from locals, and prepared to board USS California (BB-44), but turned back when he spotted classmates from the United States Naval Academy - who would have recognized and questioned him - on deck. Instead, he boarded USS New York (BB-34), the next ship in line, disguised as an enlisted sailor. After hiding overnight, he emerged early on the morning of the 17th, bluffed his way into the magazine of the No. 3 turret, and simulated blowing up a suicide bomb - just as the battleship was passing through the Culebra Cut, the narrowest portion of the Panama Canal. This "sank" New York, and blocked the Canal, leading the exercise arbiters to rule a defeat of the Blue Force and end that year's Grand Joint Army-Navy Exercise. Fleet Problem III was also the first which USS Langley (CV-1) took part in, replacing some of the simulated aircraft carriers used in Fleet Problem I.

==== Fleet Problem IV ====
The 1924 series culminated with Fleet Problem IV, running from 23 January to 1 February. Designed to simulate offensive amphibious operations against Japan, the Blue Fleet was based in Panama—simulating US forces based in the Philippines—while the Black Fleet, made up of the Special Service Squadron, was tasked with defending Puerto Rico—simulating Japanese defenders of Okinawa. Over the week of gameplay, Black aircraft attacked Blue forces consistently, but failed to prevent an amphibious landing - which allowed the US Marine Corps to test their new landing craft, the Christie amphibious tank, and combat logistics techniques. Fleet Problem IV met with serious criticism for having high levels of notional units - units that existed on paper, not in real life. Nearly 10% of Blue's ships and almost 70% of Black's forces were simulated. Vice Admiral Newton McCully argued that "In all exercises, constructive forces or features should be reduced to a minimum," and no later Fleet Problem used the same high level of simulated forces.

=== Fleet Problem V ===
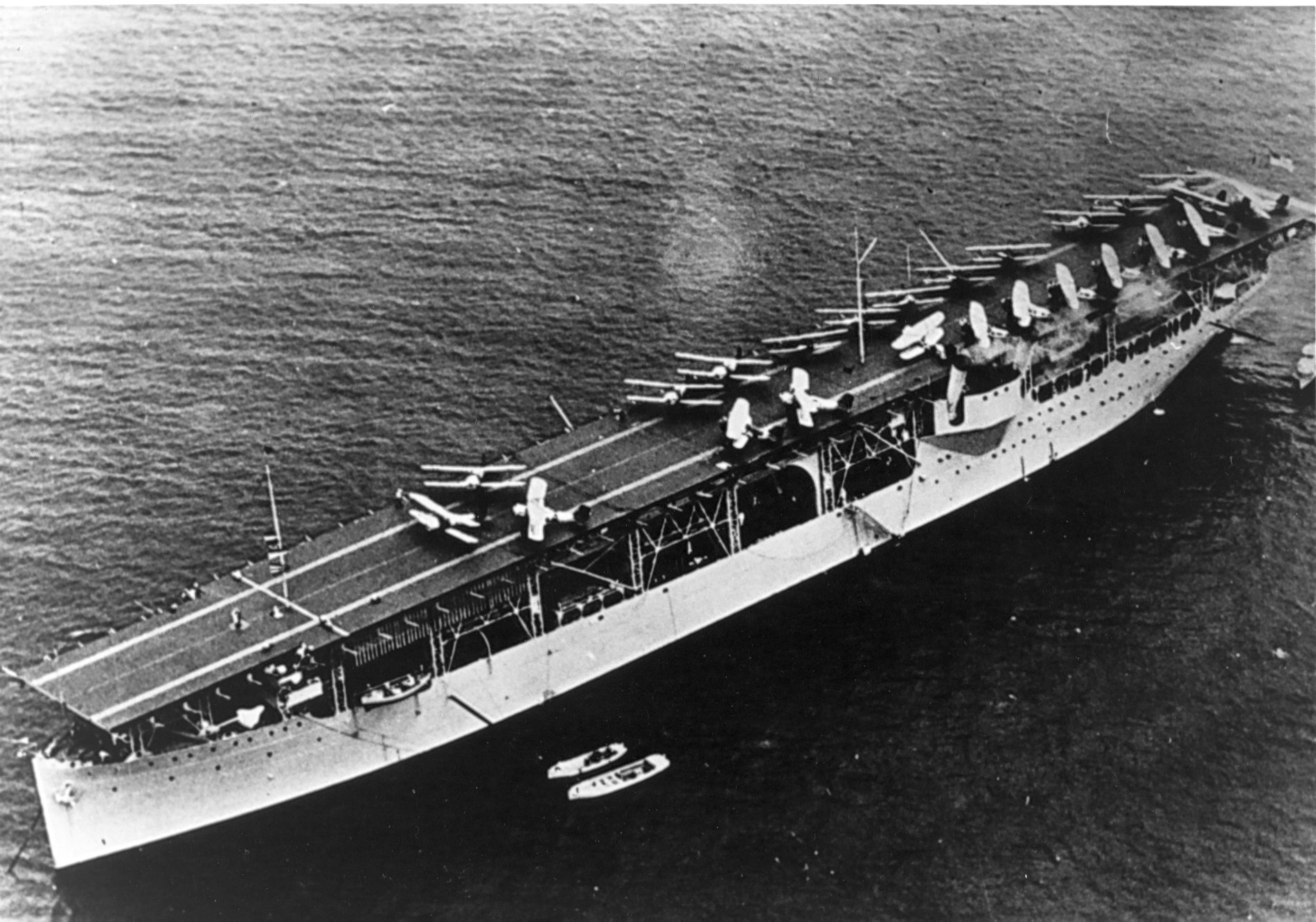
USS Langley (CV-1) in 1924, the year before her participation in Fleet Problem V.

Fleet Problem V ran from 23 February to 12 March 1925. The Black Force, the aggressor, was formed from the United States Battle Fleet, including the US' first aircraft carrier, USS Langley (CV-1), along with two seaplane tenders. This gave Black 80 aircraft, while Blue Force, formed out of the Scouting Fleet, was allotted only about 30 floatplanes, half of which were fictional. Even these had limited utility, since the floatplanes carried by Wyoming, one of Blue Force's battleships, could not be launched for lack of a working catapult. The two fleets made only limited contact on 10 March, when several Blue submarines spotted and attacked the Black fleet, before being sunk by Black escorts. By the conclusion of the exercise on 15 March, the two fleets had yet to make contact. Admiral Robert Coontz, then serving as CINCUS, remarked that "in some respects, it was a most interesting problem, as it showed that fleets might pass each other unawares." To avoid this issue in later exercises, Fleet Problems VI and VII both began with the two fleets in close proximity to one another.

While lacking a climactic battle, the exercise did improve the Navy's adoption of emerging technologies. Langley's positive performance helped speed the completion of aircraft carriers Lexington and Saratoga, and increased the role of aircraft onboard battleships and cruisers. The observed limitations of existing S-class submarines spurred a requirement for larger "fleet submarines," with the range and speed to act as scouts for the battle fleet. Both fleets failed to observe radio silence, allowing their opponents to collect transmissions, perform cryptanalysis, and in Black's case, to break Blue's codes. Throughout the exercise, both sides were able to locate the other through these methods.

While returning to San Francisco later that month, the fleet was followed closely by the Japanese tanker Hyatoma Maru, leading the fleet to tighten its communication security in an attempt to prevent espionage. Fleet Problem V was immediately followed by Grand Joint Army-Navy Exercise No. 3, in which the US Fleet simulated an attack on the Hawaiian Islands to assist the Army in testing and improving their defenses of the territory. The exercise was a failure for the Army; the fleet was able to transit from California to Hawaii undetected by Army patrol planes, and landed the 1st Marine Provisional Marines on Molokai. A series of other contested amphibious landings followed, and by the time the exercise ended on 27 April 1925, almost 30,000 Marines (most fictional, represented by smaller units) were advancing on Schofield Barracks, well into the interior of Oahu. Five days of extensive debrief followed the exercise, which CINCUS Admiral Coontz described as "the best I've ever seen." Army and Navy leadership widely agreed on the need to improve Hawaii's defenses, increasing the size of the garrison and expanding aircraft bases. They disagreed, however, on the efficacy of land-based aircraft against a battle fleet. Army pilots thought highly of their ability to find and defeat ships, reinforcing a misconception that continued until late in World War II, when the Army's failure to effectively sink Japanese ships with land-based aircraft became evident.

Following the conclusion of this exercise in late April, the US Scouting Fleet returned to the East Coast via the Panama Canal, while much of the US Battle Fleet continued on to Australia and New Zealand. The Battle Fleet's voyage lasted until October of 1925, and was the only time that the majority of the interwar US Navy left the Western Hemisphere.

=== Fleet Problem VI ===
Fleet Problem VI, held in February 1926, was the shortest in the series. The entire event lasted only 64 hours and took place exclusively in a small maneuver area off the coast of Panama. It was designed to test a discrete portion of War Plan Orange: the ability of an American naval force to relieve an Army garrison under siege in Manila. Blue (playing the US) was tasked with protecting convoys en route to the notional base, while Black was tasked with attacking the convoys. It also featured further tests of underway refueling. Fleet Problem VI was notable in being the first exercise to include an aircraft carrier within a circular defensive formation, pioneering a practice that became commonplace in World War II.

=== Fleet Problem VII ===
Fleet Problem VII was held in March 1927, with further exercises continuing until May. It focused on the same tasks of convoy defense and relief of a besieged garrison as Fleet Problem VI, and again used the Panama Canal as a stand-in for Manila. The highlight of the exercise was Langley’s successful air raid on the Panama Canal, which led CINCUS Charles F. Hughes and Panama Department Commanding General Charles H. Martin to jointly call for strengthening the air defenses of the Canal Zone.

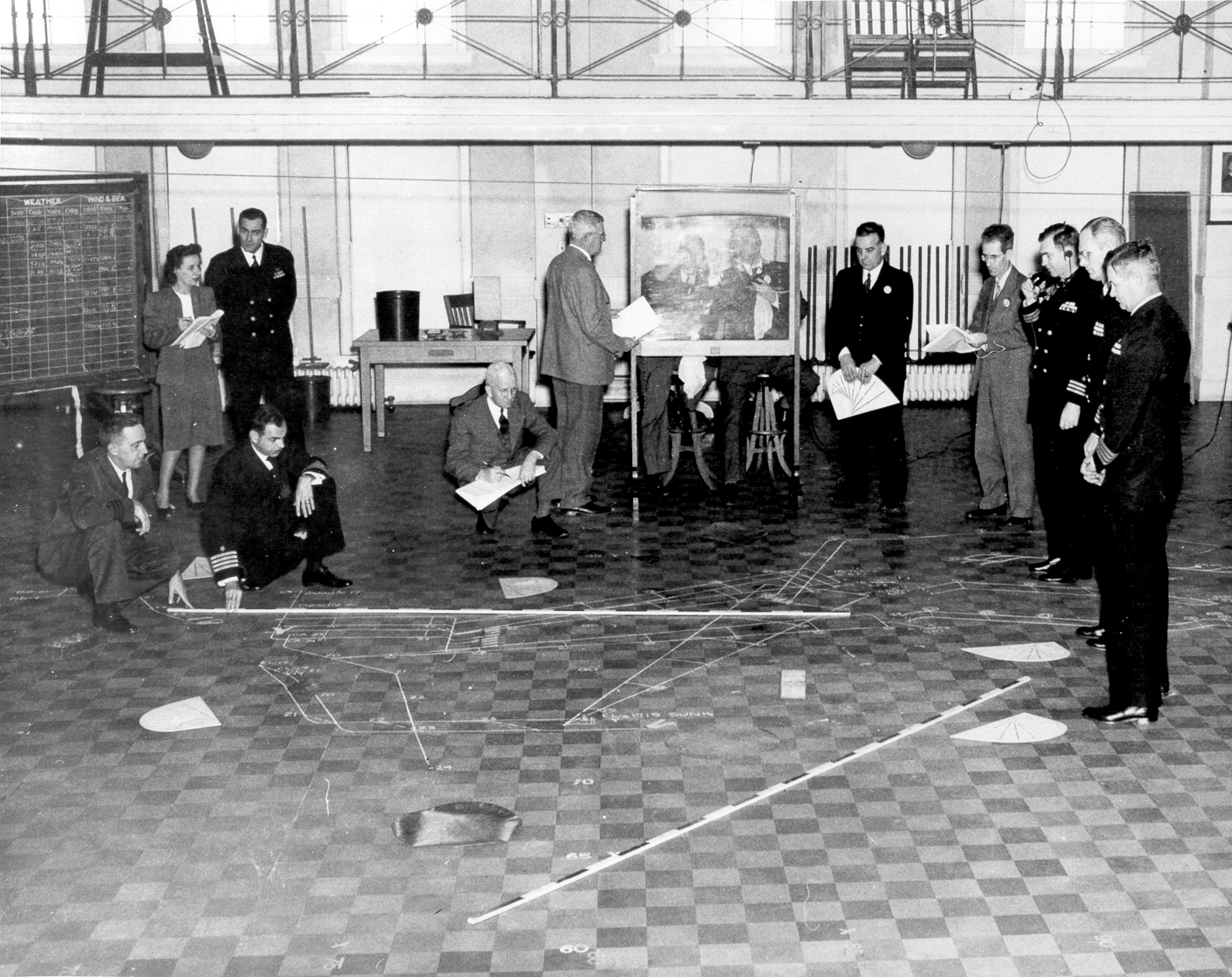
The wargame floor at the Naval War College, where scenarios like Fleet Problem VII were played out in the interwar period.

Uniquely, Fleet Problem VII and the subsequent amphibious exercises featured the Naval War College in a major role. Simultaneously with the live event in the Caribbean, the Naval War College played the same scenario out on their wargame floor. This allowed for rapid comparison of events. While an initial debrief was held on station, a more formal debrief took place at the Naval War College in Newport several weeks later, led by Admiral Charles Hughes, that meshed lessons from both the real-world and wargame scenarios.

=== Fleet Problem VIII ===
Held in April 1928 between California and Hawaii and pitted Orange, a cruiser force from Pearl Harbor, versus Blue, the Battle Force. It also involved a convoy search and anti-submarine operations.

=== Fleet Problem IX ===
This scenario in January 1929 studied the effects of an attack upon the Panama Canal and conducted the operations necessary to carry out such an eventuality, and pitted the Battle Fleet (less submarines and Lexington) against a combination of forces including the Scouting Force (augmented by Lexington), the Control Forces, Train Squadron 1, and 15th Naval District and local army defense forces. These forces represented a significant commitment of the total US Navy: 72% of the fleet's battleships, 68% of the destroyers, and 52% of modern combat aircraft were involved in the scenario. In a daring move, Saratoga was detached from the fleet with only a single cruiser as escort to make a wide sweep to the south and "attack" the Panama Canal, which was defended by the Scouting Fleet and Saratoga's sister ship, Lexington. She successfully launched her strike on 26 January and, despite being "sunk" three times later in the day, proved the versatility of a carrier-based fast task force.

=== Fleet Problem X ===
Held in 1930 in Caribbean waters. This time, however, Saratoga and Langley were "disabled" by a surprise attack from Lexington, showing how quickly air power could swing the balance in a naval action.

=== Fleet Problem XI ===
Held in April 1930 in the Caribbean.

=== Fleet Problem XII ===
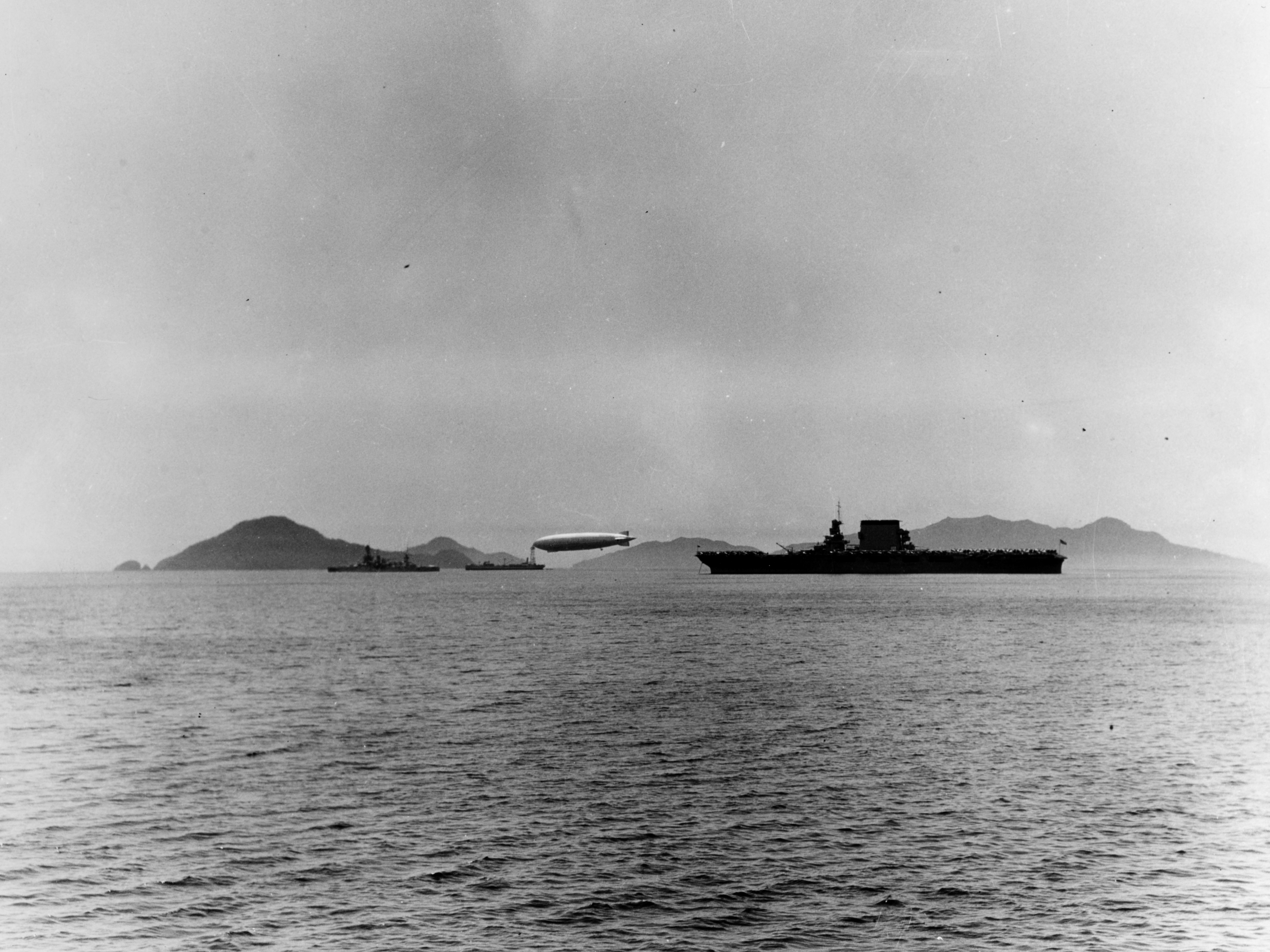
USS Los Angeles moored to USS Patoka, along with other ships off Panama during Fleet Problem XII.

Held in 1931 in waters west of Central America and Panama. Black, attacking from the west, was to land forces and establish bases in Central America and destroy the Panama Canal, while Blue defended with an aviation-heavy fleet.

Blue's two carrier groups, centered on Saratoga and Lexington, attacked the invasion fleets but failed to stop the landings and got too close to the Black fleets.

=== Fleet Problem XIII ===
Fleet Problem XIII began in March 1932, one month after Army/Navy Grand Joint Exercise 4. Blue, based in Hawaii, was to sail east and invade three "enemy" ports on the North American Pacific coastline to try to gain a foothold for future operations. Blue had nine battleships, one aircraft carrier, and many lesser ships. Black defended with one modern aircraft carrier and some fictional battleships, as well as a number of actual cruisers, submarines, and many other ships.

Blue's advance was quickly located by Black's picket line of submarines which then took heavy losses from air attack. Both sides put a priority on destroying the enemy aircraft carrier, launching air attacks almost simultaneously after a few days of probing. Significant damage was laid on both carriers, with Blue's carrier eventually "sunk" by torpedo from a Black destroyer.

After-action critiques stressed the growing importance of naval aviation, and an increased need for the construction of aircraft carriers in the event of a war in the Pacific. Submarines operating at or near the surface were seen to be critically vulnerable to air observation and attack. The exercise showed that one carrier was insufficient for either fleet attack or area defense, so the practice of two or more carriers operating together became policy. Admiral Harry E. Yarnell said that six to eight carriers would be required for a Pacific campaign, but no orders were placed for new carriers, as Depression-era financial difficulties caused President Herbert Hoover to limit naval expenses.

=== Fleet Problem XIV ===
Held 10–17 February 1933, Fleet Problem XIV was the first naval exercise to test simulated aircraft carrier attacks against the west coast of the United States. Pacific cities had for decades vied for permanent stationing of U.S. military assets, and vulnerabilities exposed through the exercises were used by metropolitan navy boosters to leverage their cases. In spite of early Navy plans for San Francisco to be home port for the main west coast fleet, these plans had failed to materialize with San Diego incrementally gaining the majority of navy investments.

Fleet Problem XIV occurred the month before Franklin D. Roosevelt, a former Assistant Secretary of the Navy, took the office of the presidency. The results of the exercise between the U.S. Navy's Black and Blue fleets, were mixed. The simulated attacks had certainly been mitigated by the defensive Blue fleet, however the Black fleet had scored key victories with strikes on San Pedro and San Francisco, California.

=== Fleet Problem XV ===
Held in May 1934 in Hawaii, this was a three-phase exercise which encompassed an attack upon and defense of the Panama Canal, the capture of advanced bases, and a major fleet engagement.

=== Fleet Problem XVI ===
Held in May 1935 in the northern Pacific off the coast of Alaska and in waters surrounding the Hawaiian Islands, this operation was divided into five distinct phases, modeled on proposals for a US offensive in the Pacific. The largest of these interwar exercises, Fleet Problem XVI was seen as a provocation by Japan, which conducted its own major exercise in response.

=== Fleet Problem XVII ===
This problem took place off the west coast of the U.S., Central America, and the Panama Canal Zone in the spring of 1936. It was a five-phase exercise devoted to preparing the fleet for anti-submarine operations, testing communications systems, and training of aircraft patrol squadrons for extended fleet operations, and pitted the Battle Force against the submarine-augmented Scouting Force.

=== Fleet Problem XVIII ===
This exercise was held in May 1937 in Alaskan waters and in the vicinity of the Hawaiian Islands and Midway, practicing the tactics of seizing advanced base sites—a technique later to be polished to a high degree into close support and amphibious warfare doctrines.

=== Fleet Problem XIX ===
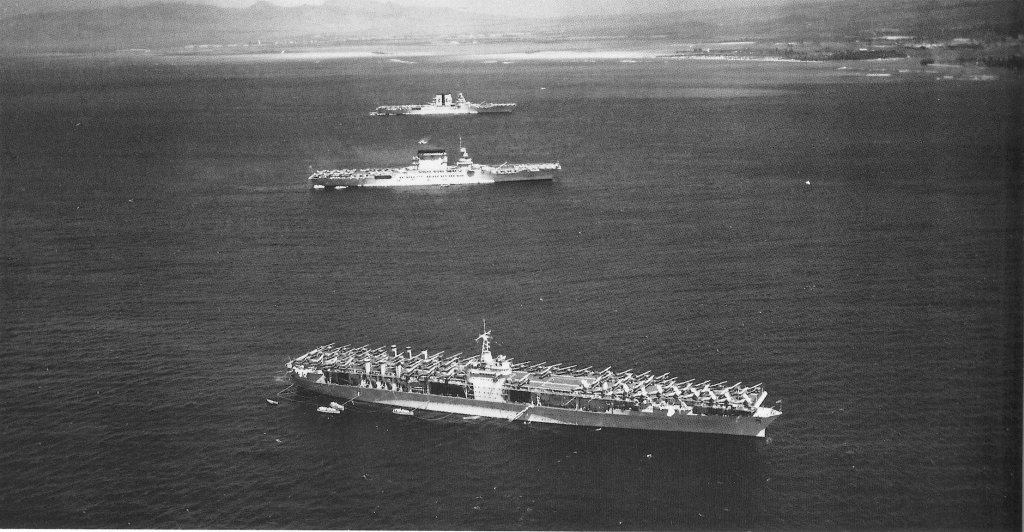
Ranger, foreground; Lexington, middle distance; and Saratoga, background, lie at anchor off Honolulu, Hawaii, 8 April 1938 during Fleet Problem XIX.

This operation in April and May 1938 gave the navy added experience in search tactics; in the use of submarines, destroyers, and aircraft in scouting and attack; in the dispositions of the fleet; and in the conduct of a major fleet battle. In addition, the exercise again dealt with the matter of seizing advanced fleet bases and defending them against minor opposition. Fleet Problem XIX also tested the capabilities of the Hawaiian Defense Force, augmenting it with fleet units to help to defend the islands against the United States Fleet as a whole. The last phase of the exercise exercised the fleet in operations against a defended coastline.

=== Fleet Problem XX ===
Took place in February 1939 in the Caribbean and Atlantic, and observed in person by President Franklin Roosevelt. The exercise simulated the defense of the East Coast of the United States and Latin America by the Black team from the invading White team. Participating in the maneuvers were 134 ships, 600 planes, and over 52,000 officers and men.

=== Fleet Problem XXI ===
Problem XXI was the first since Problem IX in 1928 that did not involve almost all of the active fleet. World War II had already begun in Europe, and the US Navy had been called upon to provide "Neutrality Patrols" in the Atlantic Ocean. Over 60 warships, including the aircraft carrier USS Ranger (CV-4), were engaged in these Atlantic patrols at the time of Fleet Problem XXI, which ran from 1 April to 17 May 1940, shrinking the wargame.

Fleet Problem XXI was preceded in March with a mobilization exercise, where a simulated period of rising tension allowed the US Navy to practice distribution of secret orders, personnel recall, contingency planning, and other aspects of pre-war crisis. By 3 April, the various participating fleet units had traveled to their starting positions, forming two teams: White, playing the US, operated out of Hawaii and Guam, while Black, playing Japan, operated out of major ports on the West Coast.

Despite the war in Europe, President Roosevelt suggested to CNO (Chief of Naval Operations) Harold Stark that the 1940 fleet problem focus on the southwest Pacific. Owing to logistical concerns, CINCUS (Commander-in-chief, US Fleet) Admiral James Richardson decided to hold the exercise (8–23 April 1940) in the vicinity of Hawaii on the premise of an enemy advancing toward Hawaii with an invasion force after having taken the Philippines. The American fleet, under the command of Admiral Adolphus Andrews, was ordered to prevent the seizure of an advanced base in the Hawaiian islands by the enemy force. Adm. Andrews decided to concentrate his fleet near Lahaina, between the enemy and the anticipated landing site in the expectation of engaging the enemy fleet in a decisive sea battle. However, the enemy commander, Admiral Charles P. Snyder, divided his forces, resulting in an inconclusive battleship engagement and the enemy's expeditionary force reaching its destination.

On 7 May, just days after the conclusion of Fleet Problem XXI, the fleet received orders to stay in Hawaii as a deterrent against Japan's growing aggressiveness. This decision was controversial; Admiral James Richardson, who was Commander in Chief, United States Fleet, protested that the fleet would be left vulnerable to air attack, as evidenced by years of successful air attacks simulated in the Fleet Problems. After months of objection, Admiral Richardson was eventually dismissed. The fleet stayed in Hawaii throughout the rising crisis with Japan, where it was attacked by Japanese air forces on December 7th, 1941.

=== Fleet Problem XXII ===
There were four proposals for the Fleet Problem scheduled for 1941, with hypothetical exercise areas in the Marshall Islands, Panama, the coast of Mexico, and the Northeastern Pacific. By 3 December 1940, Chief of Naval Operations Admiral Harold Stark had cancelled the exercise based on the worsening global situation. In the eighteen years since Fleet Problem I, the series of exercises had become high-profile enough that the cancellation made the front page of the New York Times. Reporter Leland Speers described how, due to international tensions, the fleet would remain concentrated in Pearl Harbor and was engaging in "practically continuous" gunnery training. The fleet would remain in and around Pearl Harbor until raided by Japanese air forces on 7 December 1941, which prompted the United States' entry into World War II. Following the US victory in World War II, the United States Navy adopted a strategy of forward deployment, portioning fractions of the total battle fleet out in bases around the world. This left no concentration of forces sufficient to hold maneuvers on the scale of the interwar Fleet Problems.

== 21st Century Fleet Problems ==
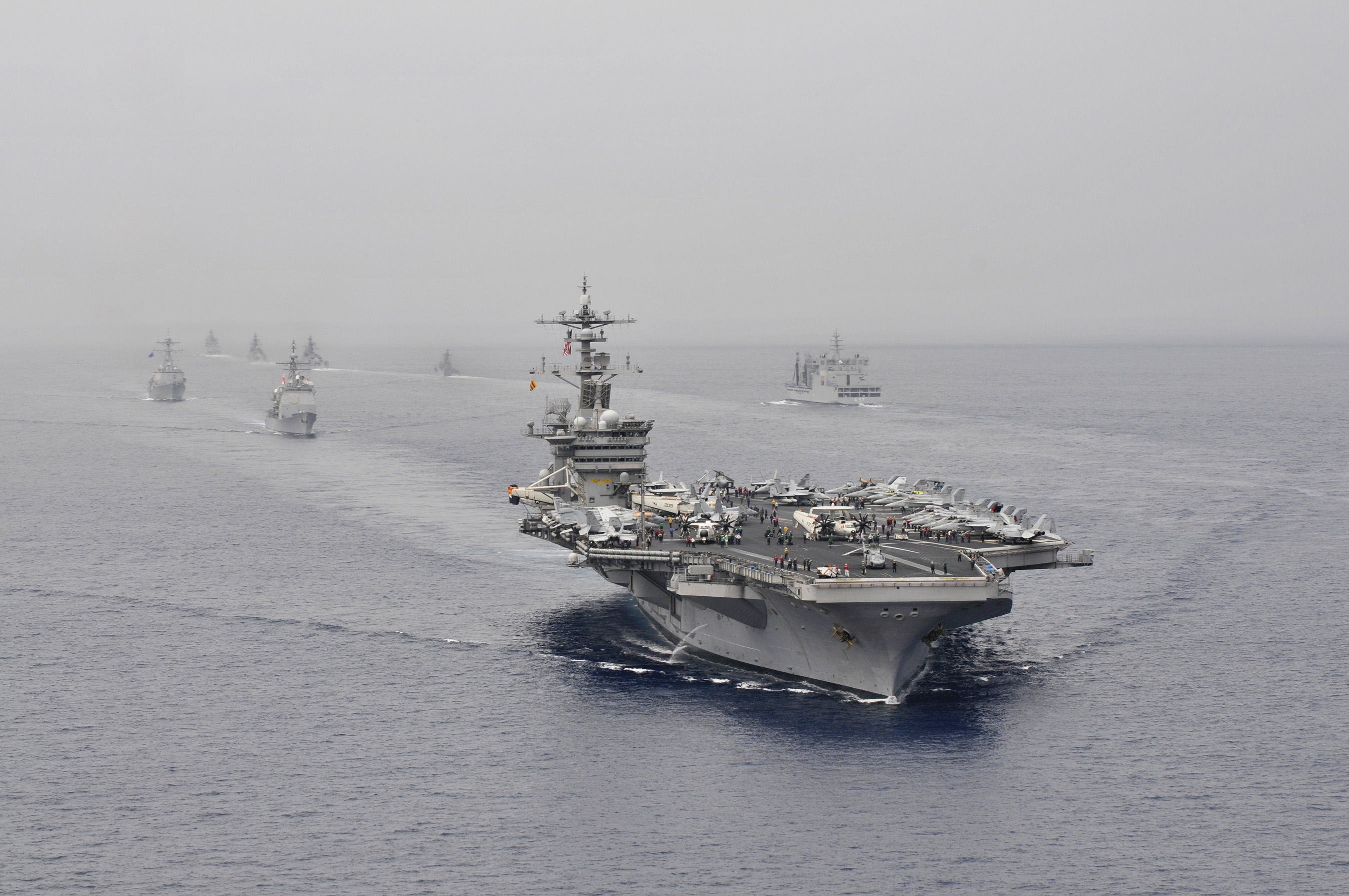
USS Carl Vinson in 2012, several years before leading Fleet Problem XXIII.

Under Admiral Scott Swift, the US Pacific Fleet resurrected the fleet Problem series in 2016, continuing the interwar naming scheme with Fleet Problem XXIII. Problem XXIII centered around Carrier Strike Group One, led by the aircraft carrier USS Carl Vinson. Pacific Fleet held five more Fleet Problems before Admiral Swift announced the series in an article of USNI Proceedings in early 2018. Later in 2018, Carrier Strike Group Nine participated in a Fleet Problem involving a contested transit from San Diego to Hawaii, which Rear Admiral Steve Koehler described as "a complete free-play high-end event." In 2021, an unnumbered Fleet Problem included a large number of unmanned vehicles led from USS Michael Monsoor (DDG 1001), a Zumwalt-class destroyer.
