= Eastern Sea Frontier =

US Navy command in World War II

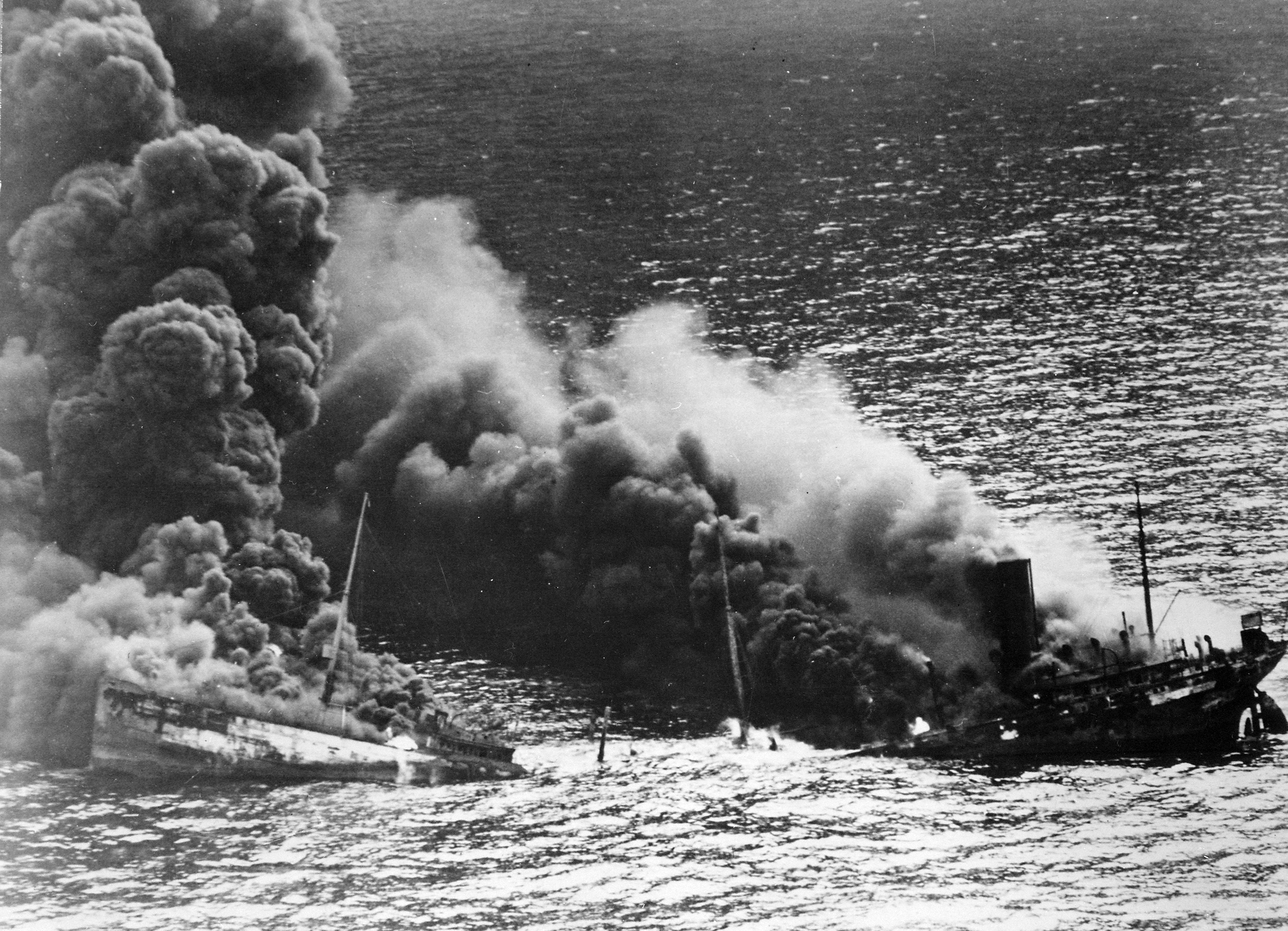
The tanker SS Dixie Arrow was torpedoed within the Eastern Sea Frontier off Cape Hatteras on 26 March 1942

The Eastern Sea Frontier (EASTSEAFRON) was a United States Navy operational command during World War II, that was responsible for the Sea Frontier along coastal waters from Canada to Jacksonville, Florida, extending out for a nominal distance of two hundred miles. The Commander was designated Commander, Eastern Sea Frontier (COMEASTSEAFRON). COMEASTSEAFRON had vessels for convoy use or other uses determined by the commander. In addition to providing escorts for convoys within its frontier, the frontier was responsible for sea-air rescue, harbor defense, shipping lane patrol, minesweeping, and air operations.

== History ==
The Code of Federal Regulations indicate Eastern Sea Frontier's commander also served as commander of the Atlantic Reserve Fleet as of 1937–38.

In December 1940 Navy Basic War Plan, RAINBOW No. 3 (PL-44) was promulgated. This Plan and WPL-42 stipulated the preparation of operations plans.

On 14 January 1941, orders were issued to transfer Rear Admiral Adolphus Andrews from his post as Commander, Scouting Force, United States Fleet to a new command as Commandant, Third Naval District. These orders were modified as of 1 March 1941, giving Admiral Andrews additional duties as Commander, North Atlantic Naval Coastal Frontier. When he relieved Rear Admiral Clark H. Woodward on 10 March 1941 for the first time the Commandant, Third Naval District was also designated as Commander, North Atlantic Naval Coastal Frontier.

On 16 March 1941 the first Operation Plan: North Atlantic Naval Coastal Frontier Plan 0–4 (RAINBOW 3), with the short title, NA-NCF-44 was issued. This Plan set up the proposed Staff of the Commander, North Atlantic Naval Coastal Frontier, which consisted of the following: Chief of Staff, Operations Officer, Shipping Control Officer, Air Officer, First Army Liaison Officer Intelligence Officer and Communication Officer. It also provided for the Command Relations and the plans for coordination with the Army Commander. Nevertheless, at this time, no officers were immediately available to fill these commands.

On 3 April 1941, a second plan was issued to modify NA-NCF-44 to make it applicable to the concept of war outlined in "RAINBOW No. 1." This modification was entitled, North Atlantic Naval Coastal Frontier Plan O-4 (RAINBOW No. 1), with the short title, NA-NCF-42. On 22 April 1941, a third plan was issued: the original Operation Plan for the Forces of the North Atlantic Naval Coastal Frontier. This plan was designated, "Operation Plan, NA-NCF-1-41." However, at this time, task forces were not created. When the Navy Basic War Plan, RAINBOW No. 2 (WPL-46) was issued in May 1941, it included important directives on the eventual organization of task forces and command relations in the naval coastal frontiers. Nevertheless, these directives merely outline an organizational structure which would not be created until a later order was issued.

WPL-46 had incorporated the structure of task forces as they had been ordered by General Order No. 143, issued 3 February 1941. On 1 July 1941, the Chief of Naval Operations formally ordered the establishment of naval coastal frontiers, thus transforming them from their theoretical status; but added in the same dispatch, "For the present, Naval Coastal Frontier Forces, as prescribed in General Order No. 143, will not be formed."

On 6 February 1942, the Secretary of the Navy formally changed the names of the coastal frontiers to sea frontiers; thereafter, the North Atlantic Naval Coastal Frontier was designated the Eastern Sea Frontier.

Eastern Sea Frontier's headquarters were located at 90 Church Street in Lower Manhattan. The commander of the Eastern Sea Frontier, until the closing months of 1943, was then-Rear Admiral Adolphus Andrews.

COMEASTSEAFRON had control and responsibility for convoys within its defined area. Convoys from adjacent sea frontiers would continue across sea frontier boundaries. Since the Eastern Sea Frontier coordinated with the Royal Canadian Navy for convoys crossing into the Canadian Coastal Zone, the Eastern Sea Frontier was the "parent" of the contiguous sea frontiers to the south, and COMEASTSEAFRON authority extended beyond its own frontier. COMEASTSEAFRON operational orders could only be appealed to Admiral Ernest King.

== Aircraft ==
COMEASTSEAFRON resources included a blimp airship group at Naval Air Engineering Station Lakehurst, a special convoy air escort group at Naval Air Station Quonset Point, and the Northern, Narragansett, New York, Delaware, Chesapeake, and Southern Air Groups operating from sixteen airfields from Bar Harbor NAAF to Naval Air Station Jacksonville. COMEASTSEAFRON worked closely with the U.S. Army Air Force in the defense of the frontier. Usually, offices of the U.S. Navy and U.S. Army Air Force officers assigned to the frontier, had their offices side by side in order to create effective two-way communications and expedited reaction to reports of enemy presence.

== Participating units ==
- VS-33

== Commanders ==
- Rear Admiral Clark H. Woodward: ? - February 6, 1942
- Vice Admiral Adolphus Andrews: February 6, 1942 - November 1, 1943
- Vice Admiral Herbert F. Leary: November 1, 1943 - January 16, 1946
- Vice Admiral Thomas C. Kinkaid: January 1946 - April 1950
- Vice Admiral Oscar C. Badger: May 1950 - April 1952
  - Rear Admiral John E. Wilkes (acting): March 1951 - June 1951
- Vice Admiral Walter S. DeLany: April 1952 - January 30, 1953
- Vice Admiral Laurance T. DuBose: February 1, 1953 - June 1, 1955
- Vice Admiral Arthur D. Struble: June 1, 1955 - July 1, 1956
- Vice Admiral Frederick W. McMahon: January 1957 - December 1958
- Vice Admiral Thomas S. Combs: December 1958 - April 1960
- Vice Admiral Charles Wellborn Jr.: March 1960 - January 1963
- Vice Admiral Harold T. Deutermann: 1963-1965
- Vice Admiral John S. McCain Jr.: 1965-1967
- Vice Admiral Andrew McBurney Jackson: 1967-1969
- Vice Admiral John M. Lee: 1969-1970
