= Charles W. Fisher Jr. =

American rear admiral

Charles Willis Fisher Jr.
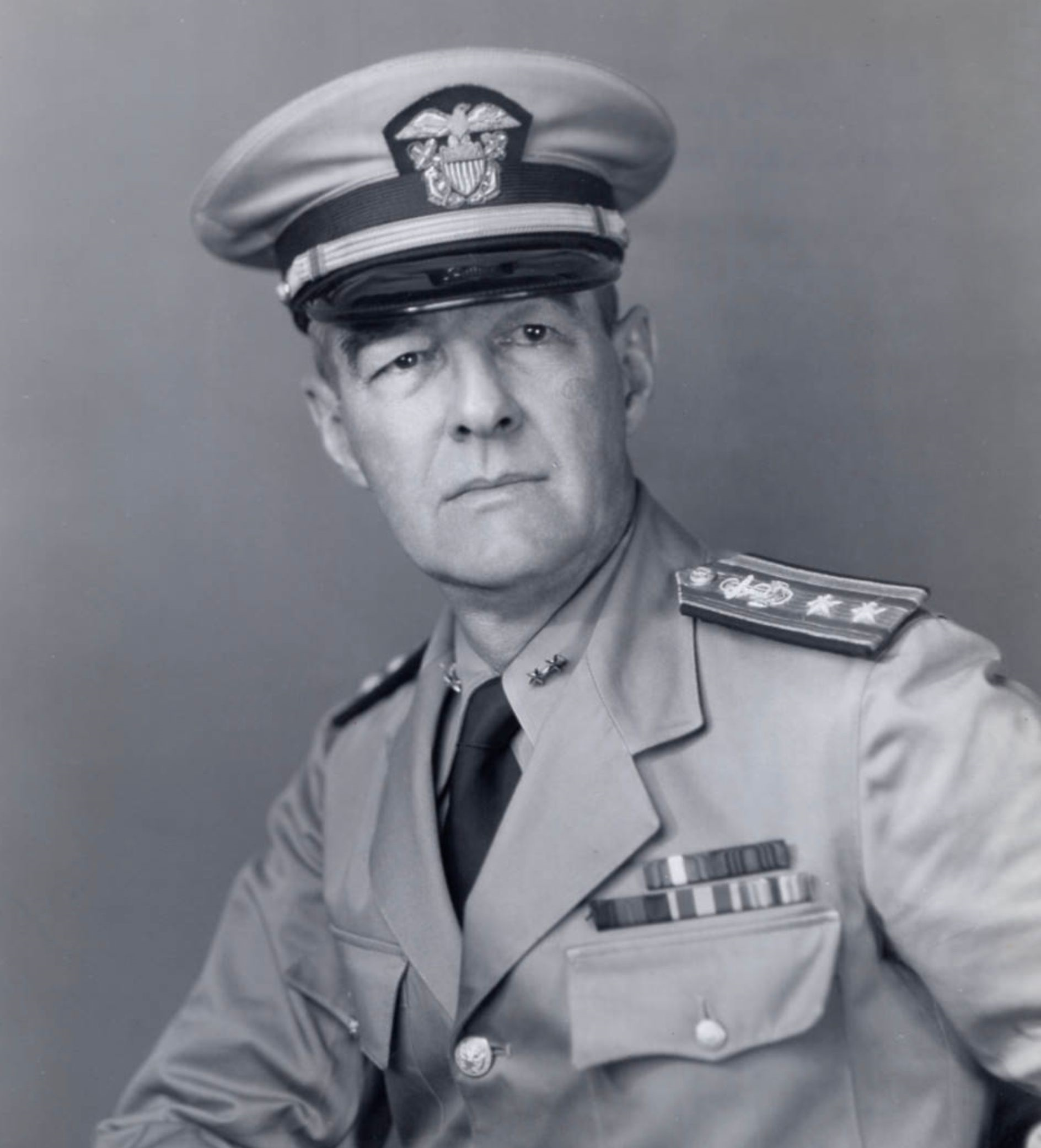
- Born: October 27, 1880; New York City, New York, U.S.
- Died: October 8, 1971 (aged 90)
- Burial place: Arlington National Cemetery
- Military career
- Allegiance: United States of America
- Branch: United States Navy
- Service years: 1901–1945
- Rank: Rear admiral
- Nickname: "Woolsey"
- Commands: Director, Shore Establishment Division
- Conflicts: Spanish–American War; World War I World War II
- Awards: Navy Cross; Legion of Merit

Charles Willis Fisher Jr. (October 27, 1880 – October 8, 1971) was a highly decorated officer in the United States Navy with the rank of rear admiral. During World War II, Fisher served as director of Shore Establishment Division.

== Early service ==
Fisher was born on October 27, 1880, in New York City, the son of Charles W. Fisher. Following the high school, he received an appointment to the United States Naval Academy at Annapolis, Maryland, in October 1897 and while at the academy, he participated as midshipman in the Spanish–American War in the waters of the West Indies and Cuba. Fisher was also active in Catboat races and Class Ring Committee and earned nickname "Woolsey".

He graduated on June 7, 1901, with Bachelor of Science degree and among his classmates were several future admirals, including World War II Chief of Naval Operations, Ernest J. King; and Burrell C. Allen, Ivan E. Bass, John Downes, Arthur P. Fairfield, Julius A. Furer, George F. Neal, Walter N. Vernou, Manley H. Simons, Rufus F. Zogbaum Jr., Adolphus Andrews and William S. Pye.

Following the graduation, Fisher joined as passed midshipman the crew of battleship USS Iowa and participated in the training exercise and patrol cruises in eastern Pacific until July 1904.

Fisher was subsequently appointed assistant naval constructor at Boston Navy Yard and was promoted to the rank of lieutenant (junior grade) on October 21, 1904, and to lieutenant on the same date. He was transferred to Naval Construction Corps two weeks later. In 1907, Fisher completed a Master of Science degree in naval architecture and marine engineering at the Massachusetts Institute of Technology. He then served at the Mare Island Navy Yard as assistant naval constructor from June 1907 until mid-August 1911, when he was ordered to the same capacity at Norfolk Navy Yard.

He was promoted to naval constructor and ordered to the Puget Sound Navy Yard in August 1914, where he participated in the repair and rebuilding of the ships for next three years. Fisher was promoted to lieutenant commander on August 29, 1916.

== World War I ==
Following the United States entry into World War I, Fisher was promoted to the temporary rank of commander on August 31, 1917, and ordered to the staff of the commander, U.S. Naval Forces in France under Admiral William Sims. Fisher was stationed in England and France and served in this capacity until November 1918, when he was ordered to the Naval Base in Brest for construction duty. For his previous service as aide to Admiral Sims, Fisher was decorated with Navy Cross, the United States military's second-highest decoration awarded for valor in combat, and also received Legion of Honour by the Government of France.

== Interwar period ==
Fisher remained in France until October 1919 and returned to the United States for duty as Member of the Compensation Board at the Navy Department. While in this capacity, he was promoted to the permanent rank of commander on January 1, 1921.

He was transferred to the Charleston Navy Yard, South Carolina, in September 1921 and served there for one year, where he was ordered to Washington, D.C., for duty at the Bureau of Construction and Repair under Rear admiral John D. Beuret.

In June 1925, Fisher was ordered to Mare Island Naval Shipyard, California, and served there as naval constructor. While in this capacity, he was promoted to the rank of captain on November 23, 1925. Fisher was promoted to manager constructor of the Mare Island Naval Shipyard in June 1927. During his tenure, he supervised the construction of submarine USS Nautilus and cruisers USS Chicago and USS San Francisco.

Fisher was transferred to San Francisco in August 1931 and appointed Member of the Board of Intelligence & Security, Pacific Coast Section. He remained in that assignment until September 1935, when he was ordered to the Washington, D.C., for duty as assistant director of Shore Establishment Division in the Office of the Secretary of the Navy under Claude A. Swanson.

== World War II ==
In September 1939, Fisher was promoted to the capacity of director of Shore Establishment Division and held overall responsibility for the coordination and improvement of the industrial establishment at the Navy Yards. His office was subordinated directly to the Secretary of the Navy. Fisher was promoted to the temporary rank of rear admiral on October 9, 1941.

Shore Establishment Division under his command had the following functions:

- Navy Yard plants and working equipment Liaison with Bureaus on their machine tool requirements.
- Labor relations. Liaison with Department of Labor in matters pertaining to labor unions, strikes, labor legislation. Security against subversive activities.
- Safety engineering in the field, Board of Awards for Beneficial Suggestions.
- Commercial and legal matters, Cost Accounting procedures. Liaison with Bureau of Labor Statistics and comparative labor and overhead costs.
- Liaison with Civil Service Commission concerning interpretation of rules and regulations, recruiting, placement, classification, and employee relations.
- Allocation of money under the Navy budget for plant maintenance, including machine tools and equipment of shore establishment activities except those under the Bureau of Ordnance and Aeronautics, the budgetary estimates involved and the keeping of records of equipment, surveys and disposal. Manufacturing at Navy Yards.
- Liaison with Bureau of Yards and Docks, on real estate and oil leases, and with the Judge Advocate General in connection therewith.
- War Plans, Selective Service involving industrial deferments, and liaison with war production emergency agencies having business with the Assistant Secretary of the Navy.
- Liaison with Officer of the Chief of Naval Operations particularly with Budget Office of quarters in shore establishments. Arrangements for Navy office space in federal buildings.

=== Disputes with CNO ===
Since 1939, there were efforts to reorganize the Navy Department by Carl Vinson, chairman of the House Naval Affairs Committee. He proposed to abolish the bureaus and to substitute in their place an Office of Naval Material paralleling the Office of Naval Operations. The proposed reorganization met with practically unanimous disapproval from the Navy and was dropped. On the other hand, Secretary of the Navy Charles Edison proposed a reorganization which would have retained the Bureau system, but was expected to provide coordination of materiel through a director of Shore Establishments, and in this way to bring about more effective and more harmonious relationships between the command, civilian, and staff elements of the Navy Department.

Fisher served as secretary's spokesman and principal advocate of the plan at the Committee Hearings, but it was opposed by Chief of Naval Operations (CNO), Admiral Harold R. Stark and was dropped. The influence of the Assistant Secretary of the Navy in such matters gradually declined and a corresponding increase in the control over the Shore Establishment by CNO took place at the same time. Fisher continued his efforts to maintain orderly and responsible procedures in this area of departmental administration. He was particularly concerned over the growing practice of bypassing the Assistant Secretary, thus keeping that office in the dark about matters for which the Assistant Secretary was responsible.

New CNO and Fisher's Naval Academy classmate, Admiral Ernest King continued in the efforts to switch the functions of Shore Establishment Division to Budget Office under CNO, but Fisher recommended against such a wholesale transfer. Fisher was replaced on January 20, 1944, by Rear Admiral Frederick G. Crisp and appointed director of Inspection Division in the Office of the Assistant Secretary of the Navy under Ralph A. Bard. He also held additional duty as a member of the Navy Manpower Survey Board under his Naval Academy classmate, Vice admiral Adolphus Andrews.

Fisher retired on shortly following the war after 44 years of active duty and received Legion of Merit by Secretary of the Navy James V. Forrestal for his distinguished service during the War.

== Death ==
Fisher died on October 8, 1971, aged 90. He was buried with full military honors at Arlington National Cemetery, Virginia, together with his wife, Una Gielow Fisher (1880–1958).

== Decorations ==
Fisher´s ribbon bar:

1st Row	Navy Cross	Legion of Merit	Sampson Medal
2nd Row	Spanish Campaign Medal	World War I Victory Medal with France Clasp	American Defense Service Medal
3rd Row	American Campaign Medal	World War II Victory Medal	Chevalier of the Legion of Honour (France)
