= Julius A. Furer =

United States Navy admiral (1880–1963)

Julius Augustus Furer
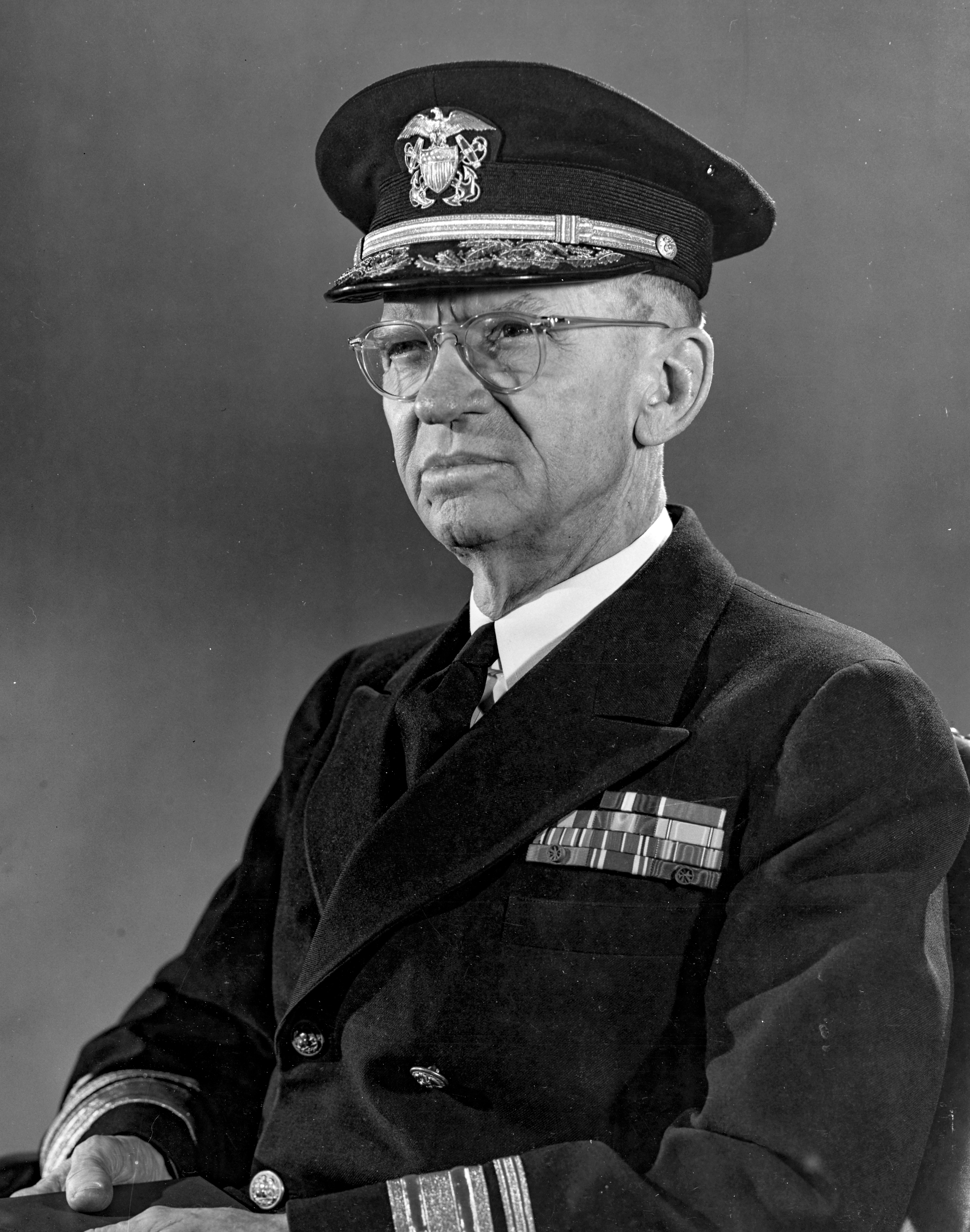
- Rear Admiral Julius A. Furer, USN in June 1945
- Born: October 9, 1880; Mosel, Wisconsin, US
- Died: June 5, 1963 (aged 82); Washington, D.C., US
- Burial place: Arlington National Cemetery
- Military career
- Allegiance: United States of America
- Branch: United States Navy
- Service years: 1901–1945
- Rank: Rear admiral
- Nickname: "Dutchie"
- Commands: Coordinator of Research and Development
- Conflicts: Spanish–American War; World War I World War II
- Awards: Navy Cross; Legion of Merit

Julius Augustus Furer (October 9, 1880 – June 5, 1963) was a highly decorated naval architect and an engineer in the United States Navy with the rank of rear admiral. During World War II, Furer served as coordinator of research and development and the senior member of the National Research and Development Board.

== Early career ==
Furer was born on October 9, 1880, in Mosel, Wisconsin, the son of German immigrants, The Reverend Edward F. Furer and Caroline Wedenseyer. He graduated from high school in Sheboygan, Wisconsin, and subsequently received an appointment to the United States Naval Academy at Annapolis, Maryland. While at the academy, Furer was nicknamed "Dutchie" and participated in the naval blockade of Cuba and bombardment of coastal targets during the Spanish–American War in the summer of 1898.

He graduated on June 7, 1901, with a Bachelor of Science degree at the top of his class, among his classmates were several future Admirals, including World War II Chief of Naval Operations, Ernest J. King; and Burrell C. Allen, Ivan E. Bass, John Downes, Arthur P. Fairfield, Charles W. Fisher Jr., George F. Neal, Walter N. Vernou, Manley H. Simons, Rufus F. Zogbaum Jr., Adolphus Andrews and William S. Pye.

Upon his graduation, Furer joined the crew of torpedo boat USS Shubrick as passed midshipman and remained there until September that year, when he was transferred to the battleship USS Indiana. He then spent one year at sea, then required by law before commissioning, participating mostly in training cruises with the Reserve fleet and patrols with the North Atlantic Squadron.

In June 1902, Furer was ordered to the New York Navy Yard, where he joined the receiving ship USS Columbia and after three months aboard, he was transferred to receiving ship USS Wabash at Boston Navy Yard. While stationed there, Furer was transferred to the Naval Construction Corps on February 3, 1903, and enrolled at the Massachusetts Institute of Technology. He graduated with a Master of Science degree in naval architecture in June 1905.

He subsequently returned to the New York Navy Yard as served there as assistant naval constructor until December 1907. While in that capacity, Furer was promoted to lieutenant (junior grade) and then directly to lieutenant on January 16, 1903. Following three-year service at Charleston Navy Yard, he was promoted to naval constructor and assigned to Philadelphia Navy Yard in November 1910, where he applied new theories of scientific management. He was promoted to lieutenant commander on July 1, 1913.

In January 1914, Furer was transferred to the Naval Station Pearl Harbor, where he served as naval constructor under Rear Admiral Charles B. T. Moore and was tasked with the purchasing of all tools, machinery, and dock facilities for the Pearl Harbor Naval Shipyard. In March 1915 the submarine USS F-4 vanished on routine patrol, and was later discovered 1 mile (1,600 m) off Fort Armstrong, 300 feet (100 m) underwater.

The submarine was later located, but all efforts to salvage her were unsuccessful, because the Navy had never salvaged a vessel from such a depth before. Furer insisted on salvaging her, and invented a submersible pontoon which raised the boat and enabled her to be moved to drydock. An investigation of her hull revealed a design error which was corrected to avoid similar accidents.

== World War I ==
By the end of October 1915, Furer was ordered to Washington, D.C., where he joined the Bureau of Construction and Repair under Rear Admiral David W. Taylor. He was appointed Officer-in-Charge of the Supply Division of that Bureau and against some opposition by advocates of smaller vessels, he proposed the construction of 110-foot submarine chasers to meet the threat of the German U-boat. Furer's arguments persuaded the Navy's General Board to order 450 vessels constructed on Furer's basic design. Furer was promoted to the temporary rank of commander on August 31, 1917.

For his service in this capacity, and his contributions to the war effort, he was decorated with the Navy Cross, the United States military's second-highest decoration. The Allies bestowed him with the French Legion of Honour, rank Officer and Belgian Order of the Crown, rank Officer.

== Interwar period ==
Furer remained in Washington until July 1919, when he was ordered back to Hawaii in order to join the staff of Commander-in-Chief, Pacific Fleet under Admiral Edward W. Eberle. While in this capacity, he was involved as fleet construction officer in the improvement of damage control, ship design, and crew comfort. Furer was promoted to the temporary rank of captain on March 2, 1920, and returned to the Bureau of Construction and Repair in June 1921.

In December 1922, he was ordered to South America for duty as a member of the U.S. Naval Mission to Brazil and remained there until April 1927, when he returned to the United States. Furer then served as inspector of naval material in Pittsburgh for one year and departed for Southeast Pacific in May 1928. He was stationed at Naval Station Cavite, Philippines and participated in the development of the aircraft facilities there.

Furer returned to the United States in August 1930 and assumed duty as manager of the industrial department of the Philadelphia Navy Yard. While in this capacity, Furer supervised the modernization of battleships USS Pennsylvania and USS New Mexico, and his tenure is marked with the lowest costs and speed of construction.

In July 1935, Furer was ordered to Europe and served as assistant naval attaché in London, Paris, Rome, the Hague and Berlin. While in England, he held additional duty as technical advisor for the London Naval Conference. He was also present during the Coronation of George VI and Elizabeth in May 1937 and received the King George VI Coronation Medal.

Furer returned to the United States in December that year and assumed duty as general inspector for Bureau of Construction and Repair under Rear Admiral William G. DuBose.

== World War II ==
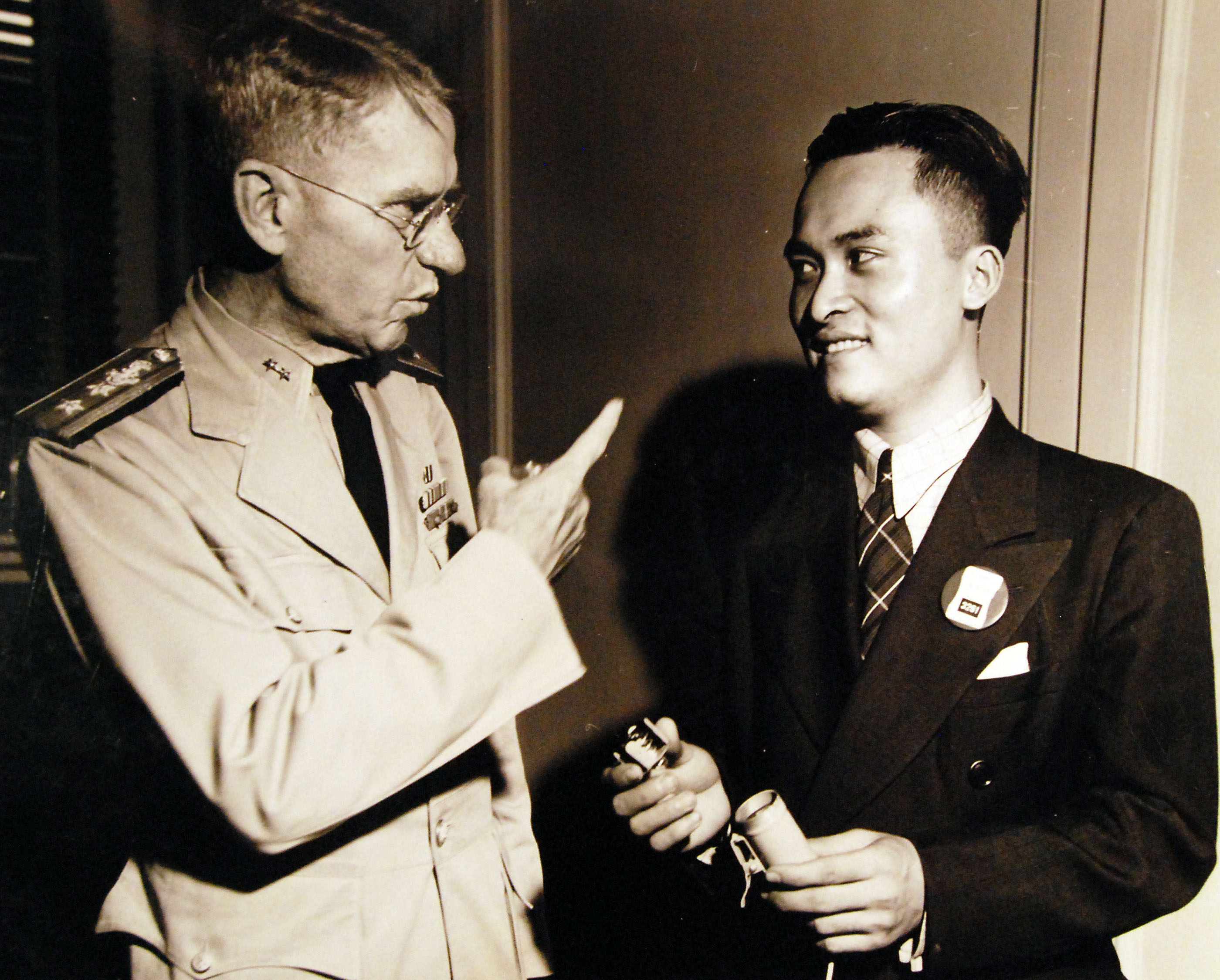
Furer (left) speaks with Poon Lim whose ingenuity enabled him to survive 133 days adrift in a lifeboat in the South Atlantic when his cargo ship, SS Benlomond, was torpedoed off the coast of West Africa by the German submarine U-172 on 23 November 1942. On 5 April 1943, three Brazilian fishermen rescued Lim as he neared the coast of Brazil. This photo was taken three months later, in July 1943.

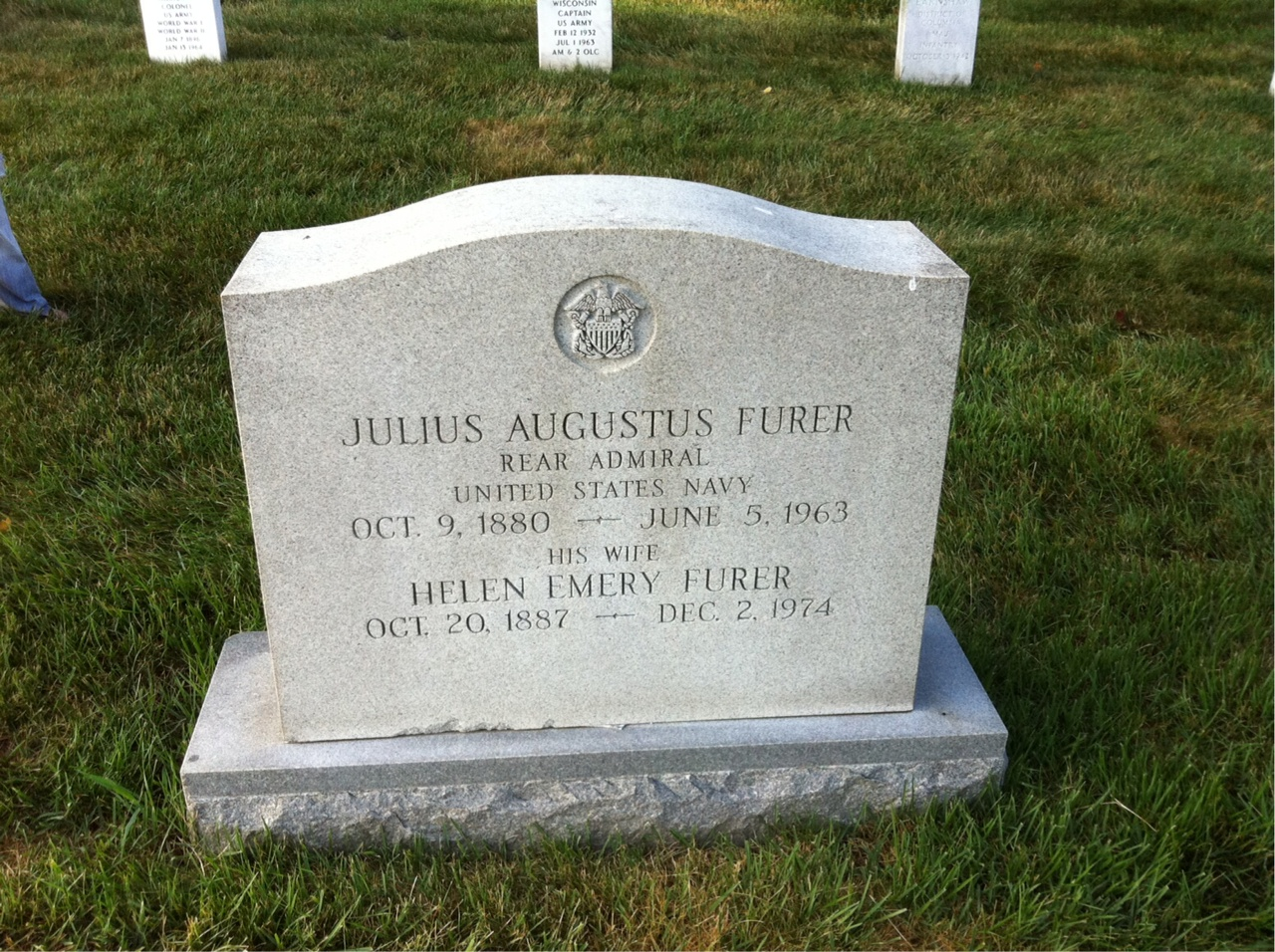
Grave of Admiral Furer at Arlington National Cemetery.

Following the United States entry into World War II, Furer was promoted to the rank of rear admiral on December 8, 1941, and assumed duty as coordinator of research and development in Washington, D.C. His main task was to establish and maintain close co-operation between the Navy and the civilian scientists engaged in the war effort. Furer also coordinated the scientific effort between Navy Department, War Department, civilian agencies and corresponding agencies of Allied nations. His office coordinated the widespread research that speeded development of the modern weapons systems for the United States Navy and assisted in the introduction of new weapons and other important developments into War service. Furer also participated in the observation tour with the Atlantic Fleet during this assignment.

Furer also held additional duty as senior member of the National Research and Development Board; member of the advisory council of the Office of Scientific Research and Development and the National Inventors Council, and as the executive member of the Research Board for National Security.

He served in this capacity until June 30, 1945, when he was detached from the post of coordinator of research and development. Furer was subsequently assigned for special duty in the Office of the Secretary of the Navy under James V. Forrestal and retired from active duty in November that year after 44 years of commissioned service. Furer was decorated with the Legion of Merit for his World War II service from Assistant Secretary of the Navy for Air, John L. Sullivan.

== Retirement ==
Furer was recalled from retirement in 1951 and served briefly with the Navy History Division, where he wrote the widely acclaimed study, "Administration of the Navy Department in World War II", which was published in 1960.

Furer died on June 5, 1963, in Washington, D.C., aged 82, and was buried with full military honors at Arlington National Cemetery, Virginia. His wife Helen Emery Furer (1887–1974) is buried beside him. The Brooke-class frigate USS Julius A. Furer was named in his honor in 1966 and launched and christened and sponsored by his wife Helen.

== Decorations ==
Furer's ribbon bar:

1st Row	Navy Cross		Legion of Merit
2nd Row	Spanish Campaign Medal	World War I Victory Medal	American Defense Service Medal
3rd Row	American Campaign Medal	European-African-Middle Eastern Campaign Medal	World War II Victory Medal
4th Row	Officer of the Legion of Honour (France)	King George VI Coronation Medal	Officer of the Order of the Crown (Belgium)
