= María Gámez =

María Gámez may refer to:

- María A. Gámez (1876–1940), Nicaraguan suffragist, historian and author
- María Gámez Gámez (born 1969), Spanish public official, director-general of the Civil Guard in 2020–2023
- María Gámez (actress) (1897–1967), appeared in The Yacht Isabel Arrived This Afternoon et al.
