= Adolphus Andrews =

United States Navy admiral

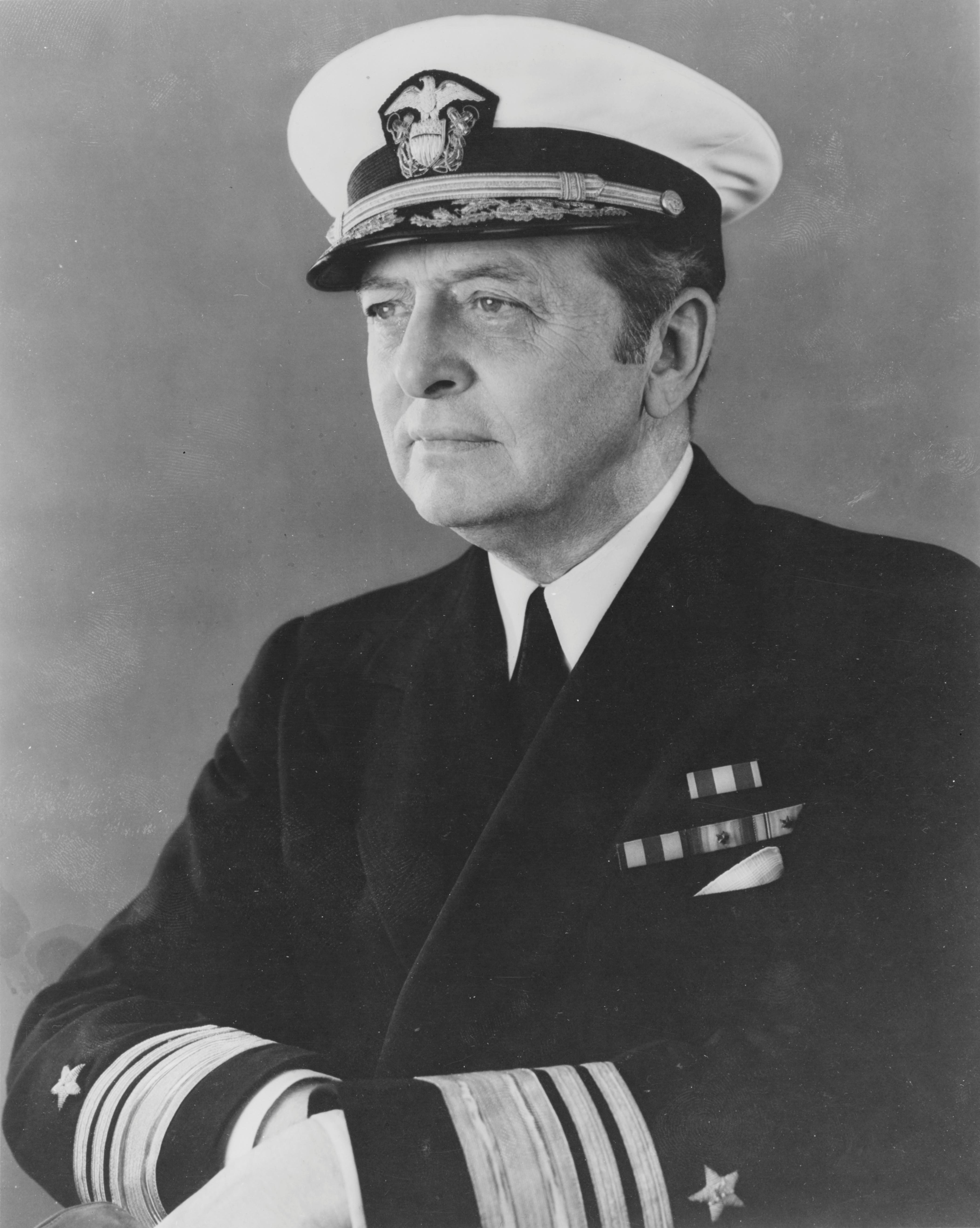
- Born: October 7, 1879; Galveston, Texas, US
- Died: June 19, 1948 (aged 68); Houston, Texas, US
- Military career
- Allegiance: United States
- Branch: United States Navy
- Service years: 1901–1944
- Rank: Vice Admiral
- Nickname: "Dolph"
- Commands: Eastern Sea Frontier; Scouting Fleet; Bureau of Navigation; USS Texas; USS Oklahoma; USS Massachusetts
- Conflicts: Spanish–American War; Occupation of Veracuz; World War I World War II
- Awards: Distinguished Service Medal

Adolphus Andrews (October 7, 1879 – June 19, 1948) was a decorated officer in the United States Navy with the rank of Vice Admiral. A Naval Academy graduate and veteran of three wars, he is most noted for his service as Commander, Eastern Sea Frontier during World War II.

He later served on the Pearl Harbor Court of Inquiry in 1944 and following the War, Andrews served as American Red Cross Commissioner for Pacific area.

== Early career ==
Adolphus Andrews was born on October 7, 1879, in Galveston, Texas, the son of merchant Adolphus Rutherford Andrews and his wife former Lala Caroline Davis. He graduated from the Oak Cliff High School in Dallas, Texas in the summer of 1895 and entered the University of Texas at Austin. Andrews spent one year at the University, before taking a competitive exam for appointment to the United States Naval Academy at Annapolis, Maryland.

He passed the exam and entered the Annapolis as Midshipman in September 1897. While at the Academy, Andrews, who was nicknamed "Dolph" was active in Fencing Team and reached the rank of Cadet-Junior Lieutenant and Adjutant. During the Spanish–American War in summer 1898, he participated in the naval blockade of Cuba and bombardment of coastal targets.

He graduated on June 7, 1901, with a Bachelor of Science degree on the top of his class and among his classmates were several future Admirals including World War II Chief of Naval Operations, Ernest J. King; and Burrell C. Allen, Ivan E. Bass, John Downes, Arthur P. Fairfield, Charles W. Fisher Jr., Julius A. Furer, George F. Neal, Walter N. Vernou, Manley H. Simons, Rufus F. Zogbaum Jr. and William S. Pye.

Upon the graduation, he was attached as Passed Midshipman to the newly commissioned battleship USS Maine which participated in a shakedown cruise to Cape Ann and later with the North Atlantic Fleet.

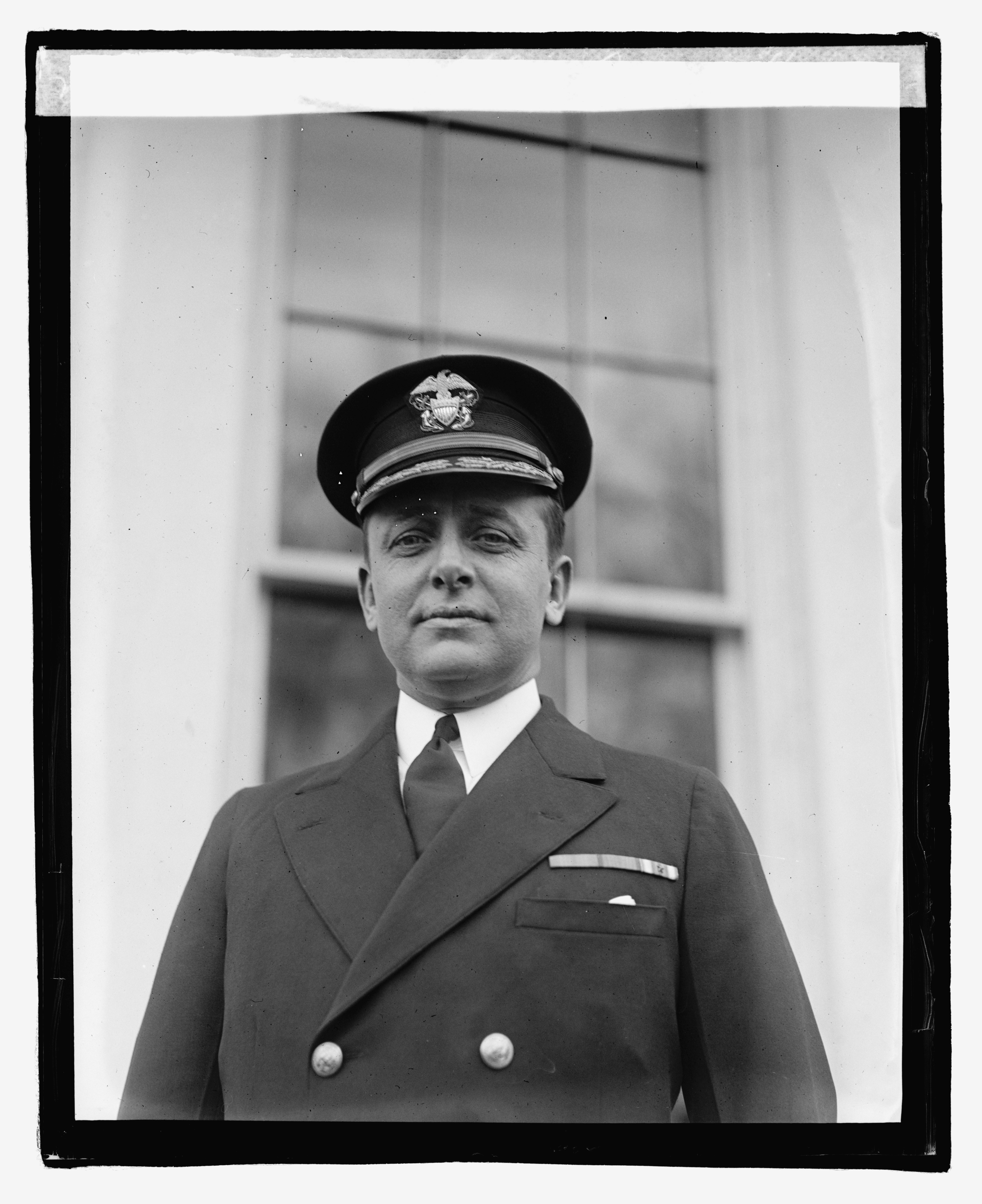
Andrews as Commander.

He was commissioned Ensign on June 7, 1903, after completing two years at sea required by law before commissioning. Andrews was subsequently attached to the gunboat USS Dolphin, which served as the Presidential Yacht for Theodore Roosevelt. He also held additional duty as Aide at the White House and was promoted consecutively to Lieutenant (junior grade) and Lieutenant on June 7, 1906.

Upon completion of his duties at the White House in February 1906, Andrews assumed command of gunboat USS Villalobos, operating with the Asiatic Squadron within Yangtze Patrol off the coast of China.

In February 1908, Andrews returned to the United States and assumed duty at New York Navy Yard, where he remained for eight months and then was transferred to the Navy Recruiting Stations in Dallas, Texas. He was assigned to the William H. Taft's Presidential Yacht USS Mayflower in October 1910 and served as Executive officer until May 1911.

Andrews subsequently returned to the United States Naval Academy at Annapolis, Maryland, and served as Aide to the Superintendent and Secretary of the Academic Board, Captain John H. Gibbons until April 1914. While in this capacity, he was promoted to the rank of Lieutenant commander on July 1, 1913.

He subsequently joined the battleship USS Michigan as Gunnery officer under the command of Captain Carlo B. Brittain. While aboard Michigan, Andrews embarked for Mexico and took part in the Occupation of Veracuz between April and June 1914. He returned to the United States at the end of June and was assigned to the battleship USS Utah serving with the Atlantic Fleet.

Andrews served again as ship's gunnery officer until May 1916, when he was ordered to the New York Shipbuilding Corporation in Camden, New Jersey, for duty in connection with fitting out the battleship USS Oklahoma. He served originally as the ship's navigator under Captain Roger Welles during the rearmament at Philadelphia Navy Yard and following the promotion and detachment of Captain Welles in January 1917, Andrews was appointed acting commanding officer.

He handed over the command to Spencer S. Wood in June 1917 and resumed his duties as navigator. Andrews was transferred to the battleship USS Mississippi in October that year and served as Executive officer under Captain Joseph L. Jayne during the period of ship's fitting out. He then participated in the training off the coast of Cuba and also served as Naval Aide to Prince Axel of Denmark during the latter's stay in the United States.

Andrews was transferred to command of the battleship USS Massachusetts in September 1918. The Massachusetts was used mostly for heavy gun target practice ship near Chesapeake Bay within the United States Atlantic Fleet. Andrews was promoted to the rank of Commander on July 1, 1918, and to the temporary rank of Captain on September 21 that year.

== Interwar period ==
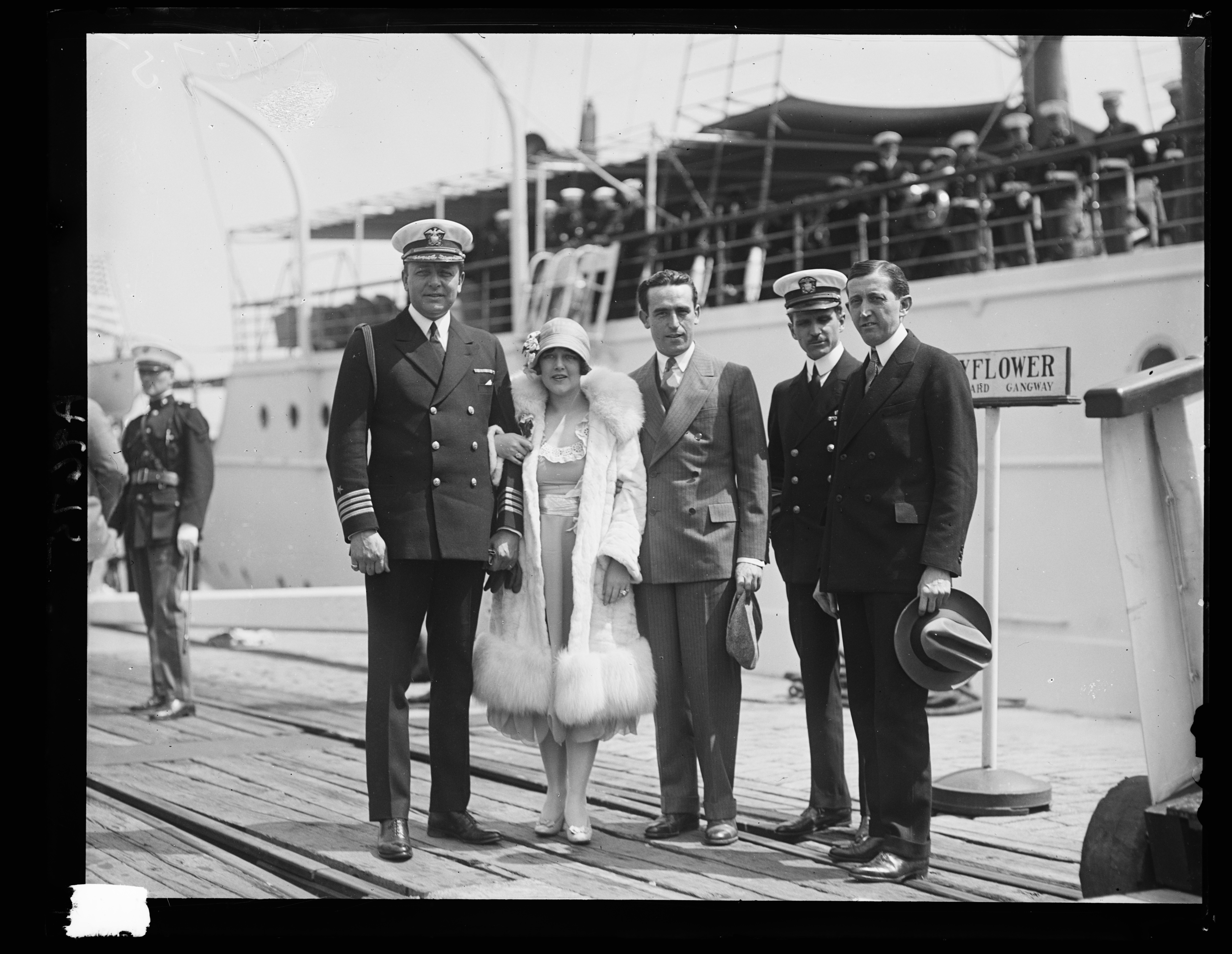
Andrews (left) with famous screen stars Mildred Davis, Harold Lloyd (center), Joel T. Boone and Will Hays during their visit to Washington, D.C., aboard Mayflower on May 16, 1925.

In December 1918, Andrews was ordered to New York City and attached to the headquarters of Third Naval District under Rear admiral Nathaniel R. Usher. He remained in that capacity until November 1919, when he was sent to the Naval War College at Newport, Rhode Island. Andrews completed the senior course in December 1920 and assumed command of repair ship USS Prometheus of the Atlantic Fleet.

Andrews remained in command of Prometheus until July 1921, when he was appointed Assistant Chief of Staff to the Commander-in-Chief, Atlantic Fleet under Admiral Hilary P. Jones. Andrews was appointed Commanding officer of the Warren G. Harding's Presidential Yacht USS Mayflower with additional duty as Presidential Naval Aide. He accompanied President Harding to Alaska and after his death in August 1923, continued as senior Naval Aide to President Calvin Coolidge.

He remained in that assignment until April 1926, when he was succeeded by Captain Wilson Brown and assumed duty as a member of the American Representation at the Geneva Preparatory Commission on Limitation of Armaments. In November that year, Andrews was appointed commander of the Naval Submarine Base at New London, Connecticut. In mid-1927 he was again sent to Geneva as a member of the American Representation for the Conference on Limitation of Armaments.

Andrews was appointed commanding officer of battleship USS Texas in July 1929 and participated in the patrol cruises with the Scouting Fleet in the Atlantic Ocean until May 1931. He was subsequently ordered to the Naval War College at Newport, Rhode Island, and appointed Chief of Staff to President of the College, Rear Admiral Harris Laning. Following the departure of Admiral Laning in May 1933, Andrews served as acting President of the College for three weeks, when he was relieved by the new President, Rear Admiral Luke McNamee.

He was subsequently appointed Chief of Staff of the Battle Force, operating in the Atlantic under Admiral Joseph M. Reeves and remained in that capacity until February 1934, when admiral Reeves was promoted to the command of the United States Fleet and took Andrews with him as Chief of Staff. While in this capacity, Andrews was promoted to the rank of Rear admiral on January 16, 1934.

In June 1935, Andrews was appointed Chief of the Bureau of Navigation in Washington, D.C., and was responsible mostly for Navy personnel administration until June 1938. He was subsequently appointed Commander, Scouting Force, operating with the United States Fleet and was promoted to the temporary rank of Vice Admiral on July 1, 1938. During his service with the Scouting Force, United States Fleet, Andrews visited Panama and received Order of Vasco Núñez de Balboa. He was also a member of the American delegation to Brazil on the occasion of the anniversary of Brazilian independence and received Order of Naval Merit.

== World War II ==
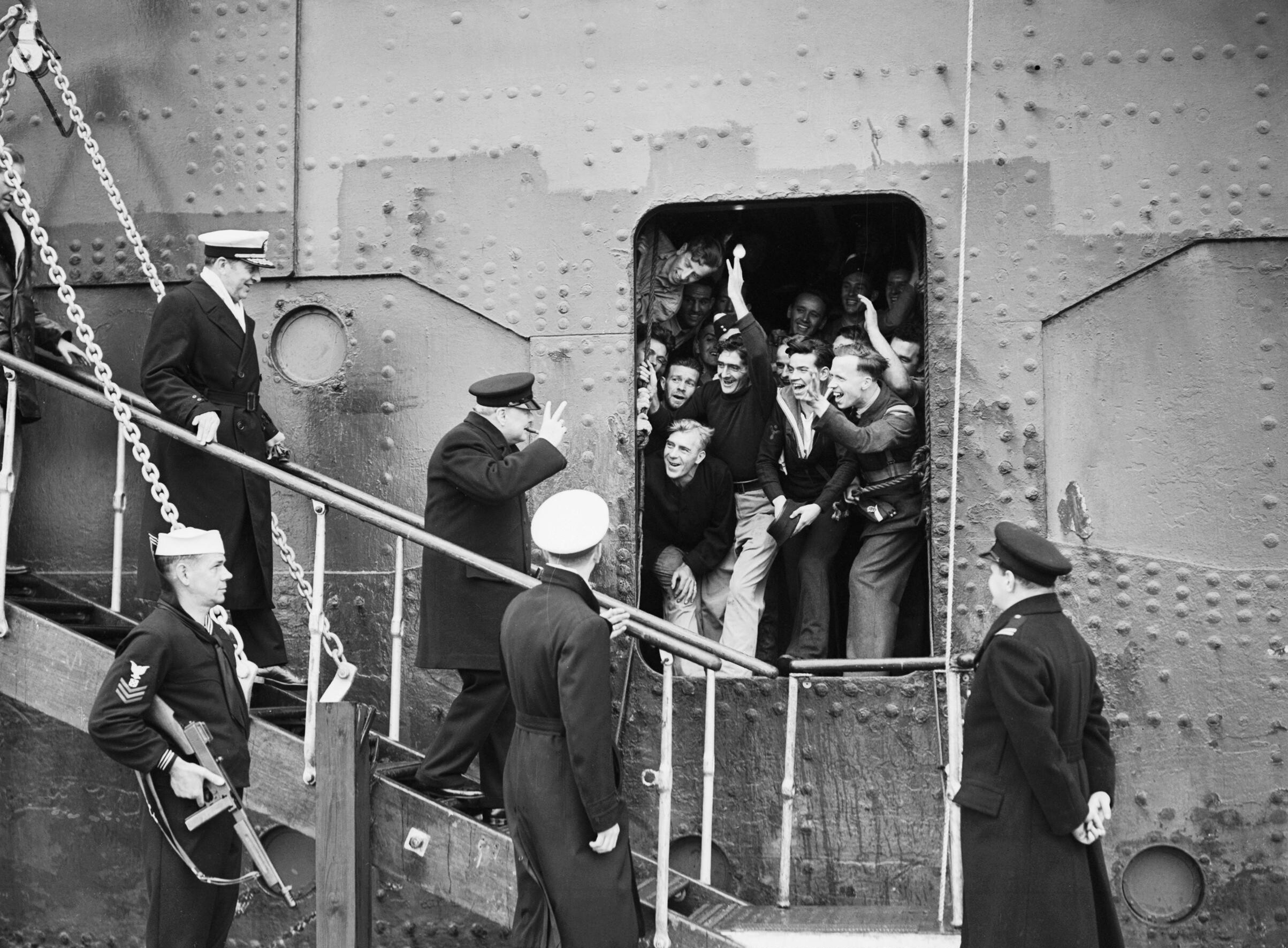
Andrews (left) following Winston Churchill during the disembarkation from SS QUEEN MARY on arrival in the USA.

Following the completion of his tour with Scouting Force in February 1941, Andrews reverted to his permanent rank of rear admiral and assumed duty as Commandant of the Third Naval District with headquarters at New York Navy Yard. While in this capacity, he also held additional duty as Commander of the North Atlantic Naval Coastal Frontier.

During the end of his tenure in February 1942, the seized ocean liner SS Normandie, which was stationed at New York Navy Yard, caught fire and capsized. The subsequent investigation focused on possible sabotage and connection to New York Mafia Boss Albert Anastasia. Due to the investigation Andrews' nomination to vice admiral was held up by the Senate Naval Affairs Committee after Senators Charles L. McNary and Owen Brewster raised the question of responsibility for the fire. Despite his rejection of advice from the ship's designer that would have saved the ship, Andrews was cleared of any wrongdoing and promoted to the rank of vice admiral backdated to May 1, 1942.

Meanwhile, Naval Coastal Frontiers were grouped in to Sea Frontiers, and the area of the Naval Coastal Frontier formerly under Andrews' command was merged into the Eastern Sea Frontier and he became its commander. For his new assignment, Andrews was re-promoted to the rank of vice admiral on May 1, 1942.

Andrews had to face the task of sweeping the stretch of the Atlantic between Nova Scotia and Florida free of enemy submarines. The submarine menace in this area ceased to be of dangerous proportions in the fall of 1942. For his successful service against German U-boats, Andrews was decorated with Navy Distinguished Service Medal.

He was transferred to the Retired list of the Navy on November 1, 1943, but remained on active as Chairman of the Navy Manpower Survey Board in the Office of the Secretary of the Navy under Frank Knox. Andrew's Board of five (among them Andrew's Naval Academy Classmate Charles W. Fisher Jr., Rear Admiral Paul F. Foster and Civil Service Commissioner Arthur S. Flemming) was appointed to determine whether shore establishments were over-manned or under-manned and whether the Navy's manpower was being utilized to the best possible advantage.

=== Pearl Harbor Court of Inquiry ===
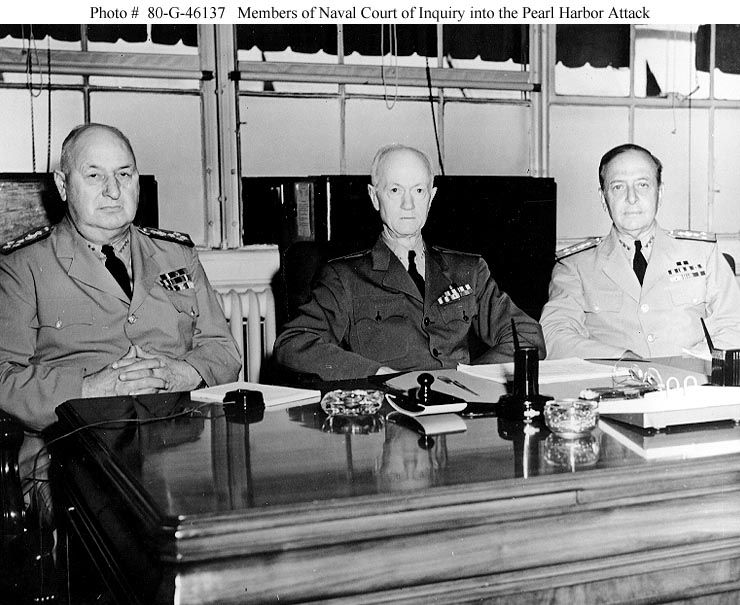
As member (right) of the Navy Court of Inquiry into the Pearl Harbor Attack, 1944. Other are Admirals Orin G. Murfin (center) and Edward C. Kalbfus.

Following the death of Secretary Knox in April 1944, his successor James V. Forrestal ordered that a Naval Court of Inquiry be convened to investigate the facts surrounding the Japanese attack on Pearl Harbor and to assess any culpability borne by members of the Navy. The Court consisted of Andrews; Admiral Orin G. Murfin, who served as President of the Court, and Admiral Edward C. Kalbfus.

The court convened on July 24, 1944, and held daily sessions in Washington, D.C., San Francisco, and Pearl Harbor. After interviewing numerous witnesses, it completed its work on October 19, 1944. Its report to the Navy Department largely exonerated Rear Admiral Husband E. Kimmel, commander in chief of the Pacific Fleet at the time of the attack. The court found that Kimmel's decisions had been correct given the limited information available to him, but criticized then-Chief of Naval Operations Harold R. Stark for failing to warn Kimmel that war was imminent. The court concluded that "based upon the facts established, the Court is of the opinion that no offenses have been committed nor serious blame incurred on the part of any person or persons in the naval service." Because the court's findings implicitly revealed that American cryptographers had broken the Japanese codes, a critical wartime secret, the court's report was not made public until after the end of the war.

Upon reviewing the report, Forrestal felt that the court had been too lenient in assigning blame for the disaster. The court had found that the Army and Navy had adequately cooperated in the defense of Pearl Harbor; that there had been no information indicating that Japanese carriers were on their way to attack Pearl Harbor; and that the attack had succeeded principally because the advanced tactical effectiveness of the Japanese aerial torpedo bombing technique could not have been predicted. Forrestal disapproved all of these findings, judging that Kimmel could have done more with the information he had had to prevent or mitigate the attack. Forrestal concluded that both Kimmel and Stark had "failed to demonstrate the superior judgment necessary for exercising command commensurate with their rank and their assigned duties."

== Retirement ==
Andrews was relieved of all active duty in December 1944 and assumed position as Commissioner of the American Red Cross for South Pacific areas in June 1945. He subsequently served as a director of the Missouri-Kansas-Texas Railway, the Texas Bank & Trust Company, the Kansas City Wholesale Grocery Company of Kansas City, Mo., and the Bird Shankle Corporation of San Antonio.

He was also a member of the New York City University Club, the Dallas Downtown Club, the Fort Worth Club, the Alibi Club, and the Metropolitan Club and Cevy Chase Country Clubs of Washington, D.C.

Andrews died following a long illness on June 19, 1948, aged 68, at Naval Hospital in Houston, Texas. He is buried with his wife Berenice Platter Andrews (1888–1992) at Fairview Cemetery in Denison, Texas. They had two children: a son, Adolphus Andrews Jr., who served as Marine Corps officer during World War II and a daughter Frances W. Andrews.

== Decorations ==
Ribbon bar of Vice admiral Andrews:

1st Row	Navy Distinguished Service Medal	Spanish Campaign Medal	Mexican Service Medal
2nd Row	World War I Victory Medal with Atlantic Fleet Clasp	American Defense Service Medal with Fleet Clasp	American Campaign Medal
3rd Row	World War II Victory Medal	Order of Naval Merit, Commander (Brazil)	Order of Vasco Núñez de Balboa, Commander (Panama)

== See also ==
- Battle of the Atlantic

Military offices
Preceded by Clark H. Woodward	Commander, Eastern Sea Frontier; February 6, 1942 – November 1, 1943	Succeeded by Herbert F. Leary
Preceded by Clark H. Woodward	Commandant, Third Naval District; March 1941 – February 1942	Succeeded by Edward J. Marquart
Preceded by William T. Tarrant	Commander, Scouting Fleet; July 3, 1938 – February 1, 1941	Succeeded by Wilson Brown
Preceded by William D. Leahy	Chief of the Bureau of Navigation; June 1935 – June 1938	Succeeded by James O. Richardson
