= USS Julius A. Furer =

United States Navy guided-missile frigate

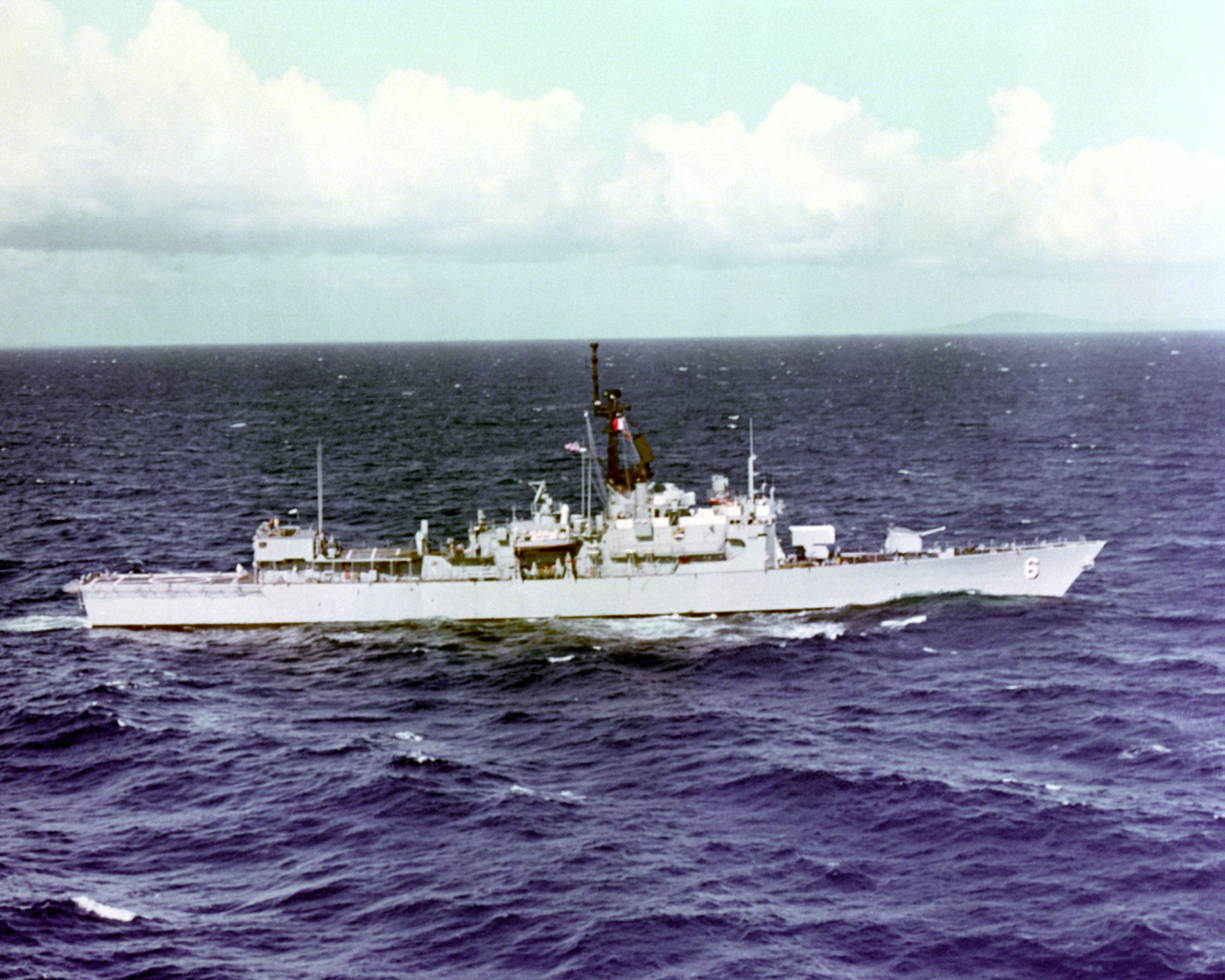
- USS Julius A. Furer (FFG-6)

History

United States
- Name: USS Julius A. Furer
- Namesake: Julius A. Furer
- Ordered: 24 May 1963
- Builder: Bath Iron Works
- Laid down: 12 July 1965
- Launched: 22 July 1966
- Acquired: 3 November 1967
- Commissioned: 11 November 1967
- Decommissioned: 31 January 1989
- Stricken: 2 February 1994
- Fate: Disposed of by Navy title transfer to the Maritime Administration, 28 March 1994

History

Pakistan
- Name: Badr
- Acquired: 31 January 1989
- Commissioned: 31 January 1989
- Decommissioned: 11 December 1993
- Fate: Returned to United States

General characteristics
- Class & type: Brooke-class frigate
- Displacement: 3,426 tons full
- Length: 414 ft (126 m)
- Beam: 44 ft (13 m)
- Draft: 14 ft 6 in (4.42 m)
- Installed power: 2 Foster Wheeler boilers; 35,000 shp (26,000 kW)
- Propulsion: 1 General Electric geared turbine; 1 shaft
- Speed: 27.2 knots (50.4 km/h; 31.3 mph)
- Range: 4,000 nautical miles (7,400 km; 4,600 mi)
- Complement: 14 officers, 214 crew
- Sensors & processing systems: AN/SPS-52 3D air search radar; AN/SPS-10 surface search radar; AN/SPG-51 missile fire control radar; AN/SQS-26 bow mounted sonar
- Electronic warfare & decoys: AN/SLQ-32; AN/SLQ-25 Nixie
- Armament: 1 × 5-inch/38-caliber gun; 1 × Mk 22 RIM-24 Tartar/RIM-66 Standard missile launcher (16 missiles); 1 × 8 cell RUR-5 ASROC launcher; 2 × 3 12.75 in (324 mm) Mk 32 torpedo tubes, Mk 46 torpedoes; 2 × MK 37 torpedo tubes (fixed, stern, removed later)
- Aircraft carried: SH-2 Seasprite

USS Julius A. Furer (FFG-6) was a Brooke-class frigate in the United States Navy.

Julius A. Furer was launched 22 July 1966 by the Bath Iron Works, Bath, Maine; and sponsored by Mrs. Julius A. Furer, widow of Rear Admiral Julius A. Furer. She was commissioned on 11 November 1967 at the Boston Naval Shipyard.

== Pakistan service ==
Julius A. Furer was decommissioned on 31 January 1989, and leased to Pakistan as PNS Badr (D-161) and returned on 11 December 1993. She was struck from the Naval Vessel Register on 2 February 1994, and disposed of by Navy title transfer to the United States Maritime Administration, 28 March 1994.

== Ship awards ==
- Navy Meritorious Unit Commendation
- Navy Expeditionary Medal (2)
- National Defense Service Medal
- Navy Sea Service Deployment Ribbon
- Coast Guard Special Operations Service Ribbon
