= María A. Gámez =

Nicaraguan suffragist (1876–1940)

- Born: 1876; Rivas
- Died: October 17, 1940 (aged 63–64); Managua
- Occupation: Women's rights activist
- Parent(s): José Dolores Gámez Guzmán

María Asunción Gámez Umaña (1876 – October 17, 1940) was a Nicaraguan suffragist, historian, and author.

María A. Gámez was born in 1876 in Rivas, the daughter of the Nicaraguan historian, journalist, and politician José Dolores Gámez Guzmán and his Costa Rican wife, Camila Umaña Espinoza.

Gámez was the only 19th century Nicaraguan woman to publish a work of history, Compendio de historia de Nicaragua. Arreglado para uso de las escuelas elementales (1896), a distillation of her father's historical work for use in schools. She published essays in the magazine Revista Femenina Ilustrada, including the essay "What is feminism?" and the travel account “Un ciclón en el mar de las Antillas”, both in 1920.

Gámez was an active suffragist in Nicaragua and corresponded with suffragists in the United States like Alice Paul and Doris Stevens. She wrote to Stevens, “I may be the only [feminist] in Nicaragua, but you can count on me in everything that deals with the rights of women and making them effective.” Gámez and other suffragists supported failed legislative efforts in 1930, 1932, and 1933 to give Nicaraguan women the vote. The 1838 Constitution of Nicaragua did not prevent female suffrage, but Nicaragua was under the control of the United States at the time and US overseers Clark Howell Woodward and Frank Ross McCoy refused to allow Nicaraguan women to vote despite the fact that women could vote in the US since 1919. Women in Nicaragua could not vote until the elections of 1957.

Gámez and Josefa Toledo de Aguerri were the first women admitted to La Academia de Geografía e Historia de Nicaragua.

María A. Gámez died on 17 October 1940 in Managua.

== Personal life ==
In 1902, she married Chester Curtis Mercury, an American lumber merchant who was U.S. consul in Managua. They had one child, José Chester Mercury, born in 1907. They divorced in 1919.
