= VS-33 =

Scouting Squadron 33
- Active: ? –5 June 1944
- Disbanded: 5 June 1944
- Country: United States
- Branch: United States Navy
- Role: Anti-submarine warfare
- Aircraft flown: Vought OS2U Kingfisher (OS2U-3); Douglas SBD Dauntless (SBD-5); Grumman G-44 Widgeon (J4F-2)
- Engagements: Battle of the Atlantic

Scouting Squadron 33 (VS-33) was a United States Navy anti-submarine warfare squadron in World War II.

== World War II ==
As part of Eastern Sea Frontier Force Headquarters Air Group operation plan 1-43, the squadron flew anti-submarine patrols while temporarily based at Naval Air Station Quonset Point, Rhode Island, and a detachment at Naval Auxiliary Air Station Martha's Vineyard, Massachusetts. During this operation, the higher headquarters was Fleet Air Wing 9 of the Atlantic Fleet Air Force for administration and Headquarters Air Group of Eastern Sea Frontier for operations. Weather permitting, the squadron maintained a routine of two sets of two-plane patrols per day, one in the morning and one in the afternoon, originating from both Quonset Point and Martha's Vineyard.

In this squadron, the OS2U-3 airplanes were radio equipped, and were armed with one fixed .30 caliber machine gun with 500 rounds of ammunition, as well as two Mark 17, 325 pound depth bombs. The SBD-5 airplanes were radio and radar equipped, and were armed with two fixed M2 Browning .50 caliber machine guns each with 180 rounds of ammunition, as well as two Mark 47, 350 pound depth bombs.
