= Newton A. McCully =

American military officer (1867–1951)

Newton Alexander McCully
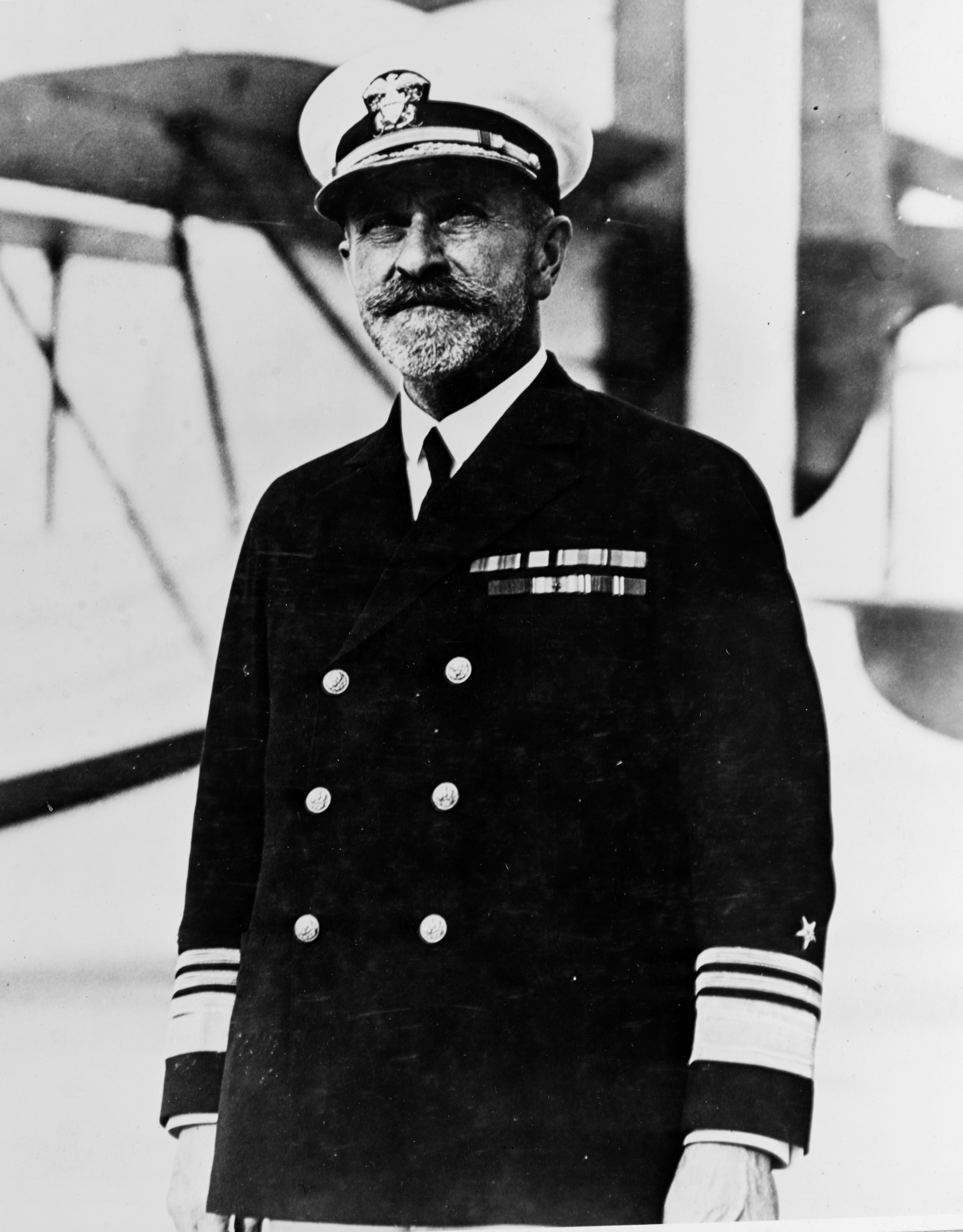
- Born: 19 June 1867; Anderson, South Carolina
- Died: 14 June 1951 (aged 83); St. Augustine, Florida
- Military career
- Allegiance: United States of America
- Branch: United States Navy
- Service years: 1887–1931
- Rank: Vice admiral
- Commands: Sixth Naval district
- Conflicts: Spanish–American War; World War I
- Awards: Distinguished Service Medal

Vice Admiral Newton Alexander McCully (1867–1951) was an officer in the United States Navy who served in the Spanish–American War and World War I.

== Biography ==
McCully, the son of Newton A. and Caroline Fretwell McCully, was born on 19 June 1867 in Anderson, South Carolina and attended the United States Naval Academy (Class of 1887).

As a lieutenant commander, McCully served as a military observer embedded within the Imperial Russian Army during the Russo-Japanese War in 1904, arriving at the front lines in Manchuria via the Trans-Siberian Railway. He returned to the United States in 1906, and submitted a long report on his findings. After the end of the war, McCully served as executive officer on the cruiser USS California (ACR-6). He was assigned to the staff of the Naval War College in 1910. In 1914, McCully returned to Russia as a naval attaché. In 1918, as a rear admiral, he was placed in command of United States Navy forces in northern Russia.

In December 1919 McCully was sent to south Russia on an intelligence mission, along with his aide, Lieutenant Commander Hugo W. Koehler, to join the Whites and report on the strength of the Bolsheviks and their potential threat.

In 1920, McCully adopted seven Russian children.

RADM Newton McCully with his seven adopted Russian children

McCully served in various assignments in the 1920s, and served as the Commander of the Scouting Fleet until 1924 when he became the chief of the American naval mission in Brazil. By 1928 McCully was the Commandant of the Charleston Navy Yard. He went into retirement in 1931.

Late in life, at age 59, McCully married Olga Krundycher (Russian), age 29, on 24 October 1927.

Admiral McCully died on 14 June 1951 in St. Augustine, Florida.

== Awards ==
- Navy Distinguished Service Medal
- Sampson Medal
- Navy Expeditionary Medal
- Spanish Campaign Medal
- Mexican Service Medal
- World War I Victory Medal

=== Distinguished Service Medal Citation ===
McCully received the National Distinguished Service Medal for his service in WWI. His citation states:

"The President of the United States of America takes pleasure in presenting the Navy Distinguished Service Medal to Rear Admiral Newton Alexander McCully, United States Navy, for exceptionally meritorious service in a duty of great responsibility as District Commander, Rochefort, in successfully handling naval activities in France south of the Loire River and safeguarding American convoys through the submarine zone during World War I."
