= Arthur P. Fairfield =

United States Navy admiral (1877–1946)

Arthur Philip Fairfield
- Fairfield while serving as Assistant Chief of Naval Operations in 1939
- Born: October 29, 1877; Saco, Maine, US
- Died: December 14, 1946 (aged 69); Bethesda, Maryland, US
- Burial place: Arlington National Cemetery
- Military career
- Allegiance: United States of America
- Branch: United States Navy
- Service years: 1901–1945
- Rank: Vice admiral
- Commands: USS Gregory; USS McDougal; USS Chester; Cruiser Division 7, Scouting Force; Battleship Division Three
- Conflicts: Spanish–American War; World War I World War II
- Awards: Navy Cross

Arthur Philip Fairfield (October 29, 1877 – December 14, 1946) was a vice admiral in the United States Navy.

== Biography ==
Born and raised in Saco, Maine, Fairfield was the son of Rufus Albert Fairfield and Frances Mary Patten and the great-grandson of Maine Governor John Fairfield. From 1892 to 1895, he attended the Thornton Academy. From 1895 to 1897, Fairfield studied at Bowdoin College before entering the United States Naval Academy. He served on the protected cruiser Columbia during the Spanish–American War, before graduating from the Naval Academy in 1901.

In World War I, Commander Fairfield commissioned the destroyer Gregory on 1 June 1918, and while commanding the destroyer McDougal earned the award of the Navy Cross for his "prompt and efficient action in contact on September 8 with a submarine which attempted an attack upon a convoy".

Commander Fairfield taught at the United States Naval Academy following World War I, where he compiled a new Naval Academy textbook Naval Ordnance in 1920 for publication in 1921. He was promoted to captain in November 1923.

Captain Fairfield commanded the heavy cruiser Chester from 1930–1932. He then attended the senior class at the Naval War College, graduating in 1933. Fairfield was promoted to rear admiral in September 1934 and given command of Cruiser Division 7, Scouting Force.

In 1936, Fairfield commanded Squadron 40-T, a special temporary squadron, organized to evacuate American nationals from the Spanish Civil War areas. With the light cruiser Raleigh as his flagship Rear Admiral Fairfield sailed with the destroyers Kane and Hatfield and the Coast Guard Cutter Cayuga to Spain, and saved hundreds of Americans.

In 1938–39 Fairfield served as Assistant Chief of Naval Operations, and in 1939–1940, was commander of Battleship Division Three of the United States Fleet.

Fairfield was promoted to vice admiral when he retired on November 1, 1941. He was called back to active duty after the U.S. entered World War II the following month. He served as an advisor to the Maritime Commission, and was Chairman of the Board of Medals and Decorations, among other duties.

Fairfield retired again in 1945, and died on December 14, 1946, at the Naval Medical Center in Bethesda, Maryland. He and his wife Nancy Douglas Duval (1874–1947) are buried at Arlington National Cemetery in Virginia.

== Namesake ==
The Liberty ship, launched in June 1944 as the William Hodson, which served as the Chung Tung under Lend-Lease to the Republic of China, was renamed Arthur P. Fairfield in 1947, then Admiral Arthur P. Fairfield in 1948, while being operated by the American Pacific Steamship Company.
