= Clark H. Woodward =

United States Navy admiral

- RADM Clark H. Woodward in 1919
- Nickname: "Woody"
- Born: Clark Howell Woodward; March 4, 1877; Atlanta, Georgia, U.S.
- Died: May 29, 1967 (aged 90) Arlington, Virginia, U.S.
- Buried: Arlington National Cemetery
- Allegiance: United States of America
- Branch: United States Navy
- Service years: 1898–1953
- Rank: Vice Admiral
- Commands: USS Milwaukee; Panama Canal District; U.S. Third Naval District; New York Navy Yard
- Conflicts: Spanish–American War; Philippine–American War; Boxer Rebellion; World War I World War II
- Awards: Navy Cross

Clark Howell Woodward (March 4, 1877 – May 29, 1967) served the United States Navy in five wars: the Spanish–American War, Philippine–American War, the Chinese Boxer Rebellion, and both World Wars. A staunch promoter of an advanced U.S. Navy, he influenced priorities and policies concerning the upgrading and construction of modern naval warships. Upon his retirement after fifty years and six months of active duty, he assured an audience at Annapolis that "the first fifty years were the hardest."

== Combat experience ==
Born in Atlanta, on March 4, 1877, Woodward was an active naval officer early on. While still a midshipman attending the United States Naval Academy, he was activated early for duty in the Spanish–American War, during which he served on the armored cruiser USS Brooklyn. Graduating in January 1899, he was immediately dispatched to help quell the Nicaraguan revolution of February 2 through March 5, 1899. In November of that same year, he joined the China Relief Expedition representing the United States in the Eight-Nation Alliance opposing the Boxer Rebellion uprising. Promoted from ensign to lieutenant, Woodward was attached to the Asiatic Station of the United States Navy, where he fought during the Philippine Insurrection and its military aftermath. Promoted again, Lt. Commander Woodward served as commander of the First Destroyer Flotilla of the Asiatic Fleet in 1906 and 1907.

Although an experienced naval officer trained to lead sailors, Woodward earned a Navy Expert Rifle Medal in 1910, and served in U.S. Navy combat missions in Nicaragua in 1912, the Gulf of Mexico in 1914, and the Caribbean in 1915. Promoted to commander, he served as executive officer of the battleship USS New York, flagship of the American Squadron operating in the North Sea during World War I. Woodward emerged from the war a decorated veteran with a Navy Cross and the first of his two Navy Distinguished Service Medals.

== Peacetime service ==
After World War I, Captain Woodward served as commanding officer of USS Milwaukee. In 1921, while stationed in San Diego, he married Charlotte Margaret Linné, widow of Captain Edward Graham Parker, M.D., USNMC, and daughter of Catherine Fitzpatrick (O'Reilly) and Captain John Conrad Linné, keeper of the lighthouse at Goat Island in San Francisco Bay. From 1927 to 1931, Captain Woodward served as superintendent of the Panama Canal District. Awarded a commodore's star in June 1931, Rear Admiral (lower half) Woodward was designated commander of the U.S. Navy's Cruiser Division Three. Several years later, with a second star on each shoulder, Rear Admiral (upper half) Woodward was assigned command of the U.S. Third Naval District, which covered Connecticut, New Jersey, and southern New York and had its headquarters in lower Manhattan. In 1937 he was additionally given command of the U.S. Navy Yard, New York, popularly referred to as the Brooklyn Navy Yard. (Its official name at that time was U.S. Navy Yard, New York, and it was referred to in correspondence as the New York Navy Yard. The yard's unofficial "Brooklyn" nickname was never used by the Navy Department.)

=== The Navy Yard ===
As commander of the New York Navy Yard from October 1, 1937 to March 1, 1941, Admiral Woodward was not only charged with the construction of warships, but he also had oversight of the Brooklyn Naval Hospital, located on the eastern side of Wallabout Bay; the Material and Chemical Laboratories at the Navy Yard; and numerous supply depots around the borough of Brooklyn. As the last commandant to simultaneously command the U.S. Navy Yard and the Third Naval District, Woodward held a complex dual-position, having to answer to both the Secretary of the Navy and the Chief of Naval Operations (CNO). His performance in that dual command earned him his second Distinguished Service Medal (Navy), at that time the highest award bestowed by the United States Navy, until it was superseded by the Navy Cross in 1942. During that period, Woodward and his wife officially resided at the Commandant's House in the Navy Yard, but they stayed more often in an Upper West Side apartment on Riverside Drive, due to Charlotte Woodward's objection to the industrial noise and soot of the Yard.

Contention surrounded the construction of materiel in the years leading up to World War II. Woodward was convinced that only battleships, not aircraft carriers and their warplane squadrons, could project sufficient naval power abroad. In this he had long contended, agreeing with Assistant Secretary of the Navy Franklin D. Roosevelt in 1922 when the future Commander-in-Chief stated his belief that "the day of the battleship has not passed, and it is highly unlikely that an airplane, or fleet of them, could ever successfully sink a fleet of Navy vessels under battle conditions." Woodward himself is noted as saying, as late as 1939, that "as far as sinking a ship with a bomb is concerned, you just can’t do it." (Ironically, just three years later, his son-in-law Miles Browning would prove that opinion wrong by devastating the Japanese Navy with aggressive carrier-launched aerial attacks at the Battle of Midway.) Under Woodward's command during the late-1930s, the Navy Yard began to concentrate less on cruiser and other smaller warship production, shifting its priority to the building of new battleships. Capable of constructing three cruisers and two cutters simultaneously, the Yard now put all of its resources into the building of gigantic battleships.

Under Clark Woodward's watch as commandant, the U.S. Navy also undertook an accelerated upgrading and expansion of the Brooklyn Navy Yard. The entire physical plant was overhauled, all of its older factories (many dating as far back as the Civil War) remodeled and repaired. A huge new turret shop was built, and a mammoth Hammerhead crane, capable of lifting 350 tons, was constructed to capacitate battleship fabrication. Forcing rights of condemnation under eminent domain, the yard took over the old Wallabout Market abutting it to the east, using the expanded space to build two additional 1100-foot dry docks, a new foundry, several subassembly shops, and a materials laboratory. Under Woodward's oversight, additional docks and berths were constructed on the East River, and miles of roads and railroad tracks were added to interconnect the upgraded facility.

== Military advocate ==
While commanding the Third Naval District and the Brooklyn Navy Yard, Woodward was an outspoken supporter of an expanded U.S. Navy, constantly warning that it was inferior to those of both Great Britain and the troublesome Japanese. Arguing that the pace of new construction was far too slow, he despaired that the U.S. Navy was "woefully weak" in destroyers and submarines. In 1940, the Brooklyn Eagle carried numerous speeches of his in which Woodward warned not only of America's "third-place" status, but also that the United States Army lacked the strength to repel a potential attack on the Navy Yard if an enemy managed to break through the nation's naval defenses. Later, he would use the sinking of the SS Normandie (which he believed was sabotage and took as something of a personal affront) to underline his concerns.

Promoted to Vice Admiral, Clark Howell Woodward left his positions in New York in March 1941. Rear Admiral Edward J. Marquart succeeded Woodward as commandant of the New York Navy Yard. However, command of the Third Naval District went to another admiral, Adolphus Andrews. With Woodward facing forced retirement due to age, the Navy Department felt that the two positions would be too much for a lesser individual to handle. While Woodward had served the longest term of any Commandant, U.S. Navy Yard, New York, or Commander, Third Naval District, in the 1930s and 1940s, those responsibilities have been separated between two naval officers ever since his command.

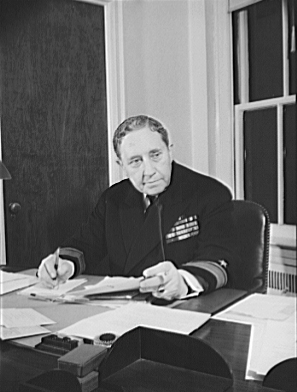
Woodward during World War II.

== Reactivation ==
In a speech delivered on what proved to be the eve of war, 6 December 1941, Woodward predicted that the United States Navy would soon be able to defeat any and all naval forces in the world, in both the Atlantic and Pacific oceans simultaneously. He was called back to active duty the very next day, and his words were proven prescient by his beloved Navy's successful prosecution of both the Pacific War and the Battle of the Atlantic.

Finally retiring in 1948, after over fifty years of service, Woodward continued to work for the Navy with retired status during the Korean War. Upon the armistice in 1953, he withdrew from duty altogether. However, he remained a staunchly vocal advocate of decisive military might.

Clark Howell Woodward died a widower in Arlington, Virginia in 1967, a decade after the death of his wife in a fire. He was buried with full military honors at Arlington National Cemetery. His collection of papers spanning the years 1915 through 1968, which include correspondence, news clippings, publications, photographs, personal writing, and souvenirs which document his exceptionally long Navy career, are housed in the U.S. National Archives. (Papers of Clark H. Woodward, Operational Archives Branch, Naval Historical Center, Washington, D.C.)

== Military decorations ==
Woodward was the recipient of the following awards:

- Navy Cross
- Navy Distinguished Service Medal with Bronze Star (for second award)
- Spanish Campaign Medal (Navy), 1898
- China Relief Expedition Medal, 1899
- Navy Expert Rifle Medal, 1910
- Navy Expeditionary Medal with Bronze Star (Nicaragua 1912, Haiti 1915)
- Nicaraguan Campaign Medal, 1912
- Mexican Service Medal, 1914
- Haitian Campaign Medal, 1917
- World War I Victory Medal with West Indies Clasp
- American Defense Service Medal
- American Campaign Medal
- World War II Victory Medal
- Legion of Honor (France)
- Médaille militaire (Haiti)
