= Scouting Fleet =

Defunct component of the U.S. Navy (1922-1942)

The Scouting Fleet was an important part of the U.S. Navy, established in 1922 as part of the reorganization of the Navy after World War I. It is one of the four core units of the newly formed "American Fleet", which together with the battle Fleet, control force, and fleet Base force constitute the main fighting force. The scouting fleet is responsible for conducting large-scale reconnaissance and forward deployment missions, and consists of battleships, cruisers, destroyers, submarines, and aviation squadrons. The fleet was initially deployed in the Atlantic, then transferred to the Pacific, where it continued to operate until the beginning of World War II. In 1931, the fleet was reorganised and renamed the "Scouting Force".

== History ==
The Scouting Fleet was created in 1922 as part of a major, post-World War I reorganization of the United States Navy. The Atlantic and Pacific fleets, which comprised a significant portion of the ships in the United States Navy, were combined into a new entity, the United States Fleet. Defined as "the principal naval force of the United States," the new fleet was composed of four elements: (a) the Battle Fleet, (b) the Scouting Fleet, (c) the Control Force, and (d) the Fleet Base Force. Under the general heading of "Forces Not Assigned to the United States Fleet" came six categories: (a) Asiatic Fleet; (b) Naval Forces, Europe; (c) Special Service Squadrons; (d) Submarine Divisions, Atlantic; (e) Submarine Divisions, Pacific; and (f) Naval District Forces. While there was a reorganization in 1930, and the renaming of the Battle Fleet and Scouting Fleet as the Battle Force and Scouting Force, this would be the core structure of the United States Navy until the beginning of World War II.

The Scouting Fleet (comprising battleships, cruisers, destroyers, submarines, and aircraft squadrons) was organized to conduct reconnaissance in force, in order to enable the Battle Fleet in its task of engaging, defeating, and destroying the main body of an enemy fleet. While there were numerous interwar exercises, and other deployments, the Scouting Fleet was initially primarily deployed in the Atlantic Ocean, with the Battle Fleet in the Pacific Ocean.

Established in 1922, the fleet consisted mainly of older battleships and initially operated in the Atlantic ocean. Returning from European waters on 21 October 1922, USS Utah became the flagship of BatDiv 6, Scouting Fleet, and operated with the Scouting Fleet over the next 3½ years.

In 1931, it was redesignated as the "Scouting Force." At this time, it consisted of the remaining cruisers and destroyers that were not with the Battle Force and a "Training Squadron" of three old battleships and eight destroyers. This force operated exclusively in the Atlantic and Caribbean Sea.

In 1932, the force was moved to the Pacific. In 1940 it survived the division of the Fleet into the U.S. Pacific Fleet and the Atlantic Fleet, and served in the early part of World War II as an umbrella command for task forces.

== Commanders ==
- VADM John Daniel McDonald (1922–1923)
- VADM Newton A. McCully (June 20, 1923 - December 21, 1924)
- VADM Josiah S. McKean (December 22, 1924 – September 3, 1926)
- VADM Ashley H. Robertson (September 4, 1926 – May 30, 1927)
- VADM Montgomery M. Taylor (June 1, 1927 - July 10, 1928)
- VADM William Carey Cole (July 11, 1928 - June 13, 1930)
- VADM Arthur L. Willard (June 14, 1930 - June 23, 1932)
- RADM Frank Hodges Clark (June 24, 1932 - May 19, 1933)
- VADM Frank H. Brumby (May 20, 1933 - June 14, 1934)
- VADM Edward Hale Campbell (June 15, 1934 - April 1, 1935)
- VADM William T. Tarrant (June 24, 1936 - July 2, 1938)
- VADM Adolphus Andrews (July 3, 1938 - February 1, 1941)
- VADM Wilson Brown (February 2, 1941 - March 1942)

== Bibliography ==
- Morison, Samuel Eliot (1948). Volume III, The Rising Sun in the Pacific. Boston and Toronto: Little, Brown and Company.
