= Willard A. Kitts =

United States Navy admiral (1894–1964)

Willard Augustus Kitts III
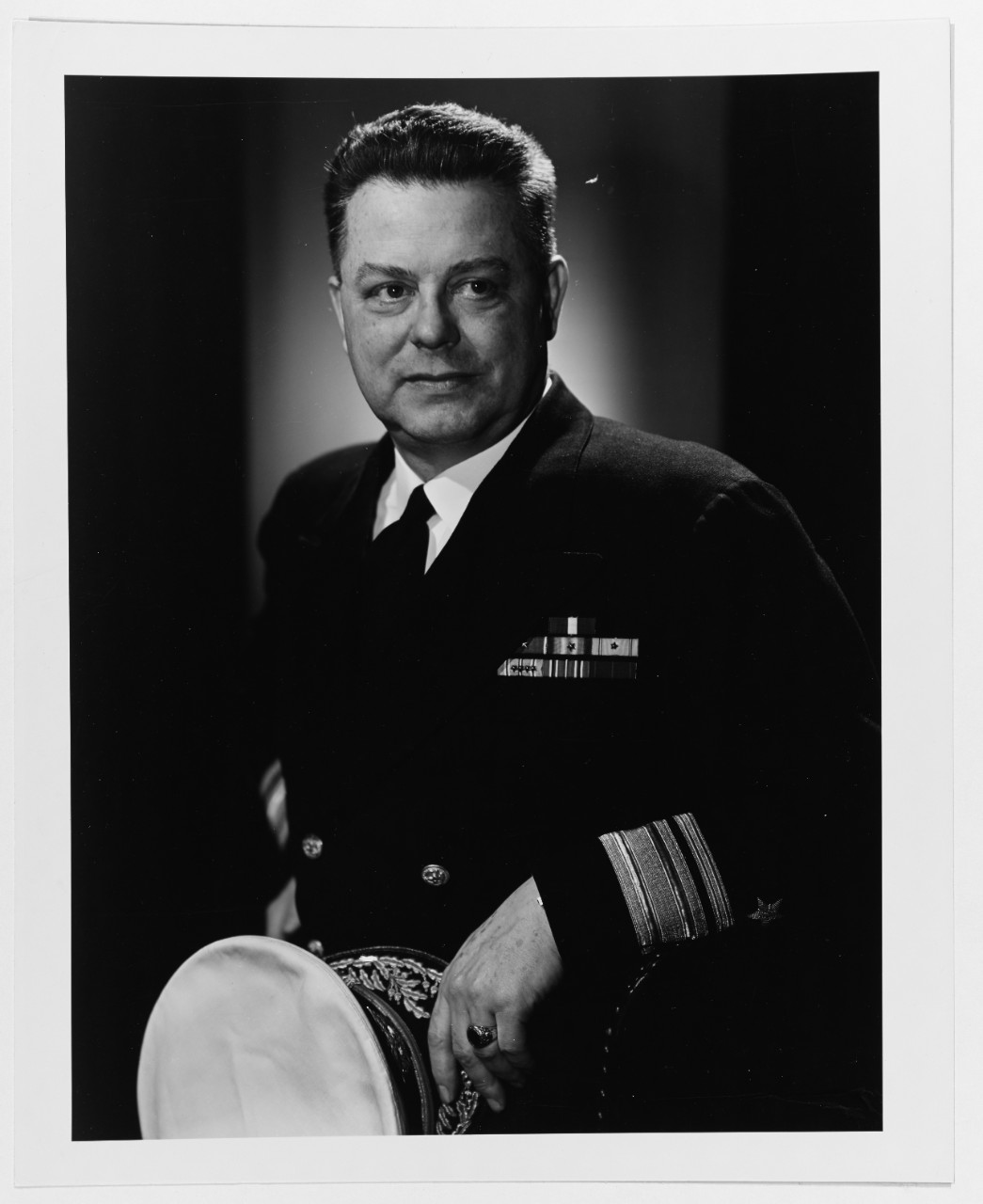
- Kitts as Rear admiral
- Born: April 14, 1894; Oswego, New York, US
- Died: November 21, 1964 (aged 70); Bethesda, Maryland, US
- Burial place: Arlington National Cemetery
- Military career
- Allegiance: United States
- Branch: United States Navy
- Service years: 1916–1951
- Rank: Vice Admiral
- Commands: Naval Proving Ground Dahlgren; Training Command, Pacific Fleet; Cruiser Division Three; USS Nevada; USS Northampton; USS McCormick
- Conflicts: World War I World War II: Attack on Pearl Harbor; Battle of the Santa Cruz Islands; Battle of Guadalcanal; Battle of Tassafaronga; Battle of Attu
- Awards: Navy Cross; Legion of Merit (3); Purple Heart
- Other work: General Electric manager

Willard Augustus Kitts III (April 14, 1894 – November 21, 1964) was a highly decorated officer in the United States Navy with the rank of vice admiral. An ordnance expert and veteran of several campaigns in the Pacific Theater during World War II, he distinguished himself as commanding officer of heavy cruiser USS Northampton, which was sunk during the Battle of Tassafaronga in November 1942.

Kitts then commanded battleship USS Nevada during the Aleutian Campaign and rose to the rank of rear admiral in late 1943, while serving as assistant chief of the Bureau of Ordnance. Following the war, he served as commander, Cruiser Division 3 and commander, Training Command, Pacific Fleet and retired in June 1951.

== Early career ==
Kitts was born on April 14, 1894, in Oswego, New York, the son of manufacturer in the Steam Specialties, Willard A. Kitts II and his wife Augusta. He graduated from the Oswego High School in summer 1912 and subsequently earned an appointed to the United States Naval Academy at Annapolis, Maryland. While at the academy, Kitts was active in the basketball and earned Varsity letter for excellence.

Among his classmates were several future distinguished flag officers, including future Chairman of the Joint Chiefs of Staff, Arthur W. Radford; four-star admirals Russell S. Berkey, Robert Carney, William Fechteler and John D. Price; vice admirals Frank E. Beatty Jr., Gerald F. Bogan, Ralph E. Davison, Calvin T. Durgin, George F. Hussey Jr., C. Turner Joy, Bertram J. Rodgers, John E. Wilkes; and rear admirals and major generals Oscar R. Cauldwell, Don P. Moon, Charles P. Cecil, Henry M. Mullinnix, Thorvald A. Solberg, Gilbert C. Hoover, and Arnold W. Jacobsen.

Kitts graduated with Bachelor of Science on June 3, 1916, and was commissioned ensign at the time. He was subsequently assigned to the battleship USS Arkansas and quickly reached the rank of Lieutenant (junior grade). Following the United States entry into World War I, Arkansas patrolled the east coast and trained gun crews until July 1918, when she embarked as the part of Battleship Squadron Six for the North Sea, where she served with the British Grand Fleet. Kitts was meanwhile promoted to the temporary rank of lieutenant on January 1, 1918, and served aboard Arkansas until December 1920, when he was ordered back to the Massachusetts Institute of Technology in Cambridge for instruction in engineering.

He graduated with Master's degree in November 1922 and was ordered to the Washington Navy Yard, where he completed instruction in Ordnance engineering in August 1923, when he joined newly commissioned battleship USS Colorado under Captain Reginald R. Belknap. Kitts took part in her maiden voyage to Europe, visiting Britain, France, Italy and the peninsula of Gibraltar, with port calls to Portsmouth, Cherbourg, Villefranche, Naples, and the British base at Gibraltar.

In June 1926, Kitts was promoted to lieutenant commander and ordered to the Naval Powder Factory, Indian Head, Maryland, as ordnance inspector. He was transferred to the staff of Destroyer Squadron 12, Battle Fleet in June 1928 and remained in that capacity until July 1931, when he was ordered to Rochester, New York, as an Inspector of Ordnance, Bausch & Lomb Optical company.

Kitts was transferred to the battleship USS New York in May 1933 and took part in numerous fleet exercises with the Pacific Fleet until May 1935, when he assumed command of the destroyer USS McCormick. He was in commanded of that vessel for one year, conducting patrols along the West Coast of the United States and was transferred to the Bureau of Ordnance in Washington, D.C., in June 1936.

He was promoted to commander on July 1, 1936, and served successively under Rear Admirals Harold R. Stark and William R. Furlong until July 1939, when he was appointed Executive officer of heavy cruiser USS Salt Lake City under Captain Ellis M. Zacharias. While in this capacity Kitts participated in patrols between Hawaii, Guam and Wake Island until February 1941, when he was ordered to Pearl Harbor for new assignment.

== World War II ==
=== Service in Hawaii ===
Kitts assumed duty as Fleet Gunnery Officer on the staff the Commander-in-Chief, Pacific Fleet under Admiral Husband E. Kimmel and was responsible for the operation, training and maintenance of the Fleet's guns and for safe storage of the Fleet's ammunition inventory. At the time of the Japanese attack on Pearl Harbor on December 7, 1941, he was present at the Navy Yard and witnessed the destruction of the Fleet's battleships. Following the War, Kitts testified before the Naval Board of Inquiry in connection with the court-martial of Admiral Kimmel.

One day following the attack, Kitts was promoted to the rank of captain and continued in his previous duties under new commander-in-chief, Admiral Chester Nimitz. He remained in that capacity until September 1942 and was decorated with Legion of Merit for his service.

=== Coral Sea and Guadalcanal ===
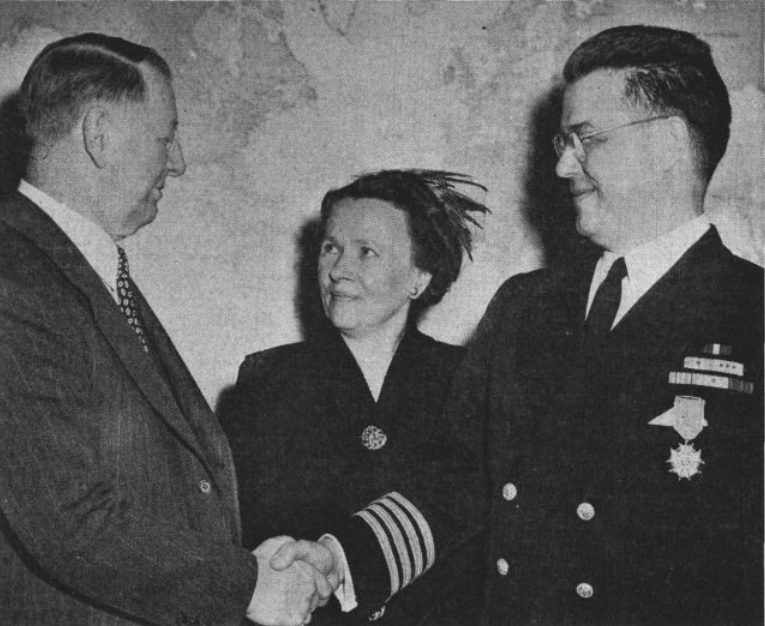
Kitts receives Legion of Merit from Secretary Frank Knox for his service at Attu in May 1943, Mrs. Fredrika Kitts looks on

Kitts then assumed command of heavy cruiser USS Northampton, then serving off the coast of Solomon Islands. He commanded Northampton during the screening of the carrier USS Hornet during attacks on Bougainville Island on October 5 and then took part in the Battle of the Santa Cruz Islands by the end of month. During that battle, Hornet was heavily damaged by Japanese torpedoes, and Kitts and his ship tried to take the damaged Hornet in tow. All efforts to save her failed and Hornet sank on October 27, 1942.

The Northampton then operated with a cruiser-destroyer force, to prevent the Japanese from reinforcing their troops on Guadalcanal. During the Battle of Tassafaronga on the night of November 30, 1942, she was hit with two torpedoes and began sinking. Kitts prevented her from beaching on the enemy shore and thereby enabled the lives of a great many of his crew to be saved. Although every possible effort was exerted to keep the damaged vessel afloat, he was finally compelled to order the crew over the side and, while following after they were all clear, was severely injured. Despite his injuries, he also demonstrated personal valor, when he returned for drowning Northampton steward Francisco Macaraeg, who could not swim.

=== Aleutians and late service ===
Kitts was rescued from the water and ordered back to the States for treatment. For his heroic conduct during the Battle of Tassafaronga, he was decorated with the Navy Cross, the United States Navy second-highest decoration awarded for valor in combat. After period of recovery, he was given command of battleship USS Nevada by the end of January 1943 and embarked for North Pacific.

His ship then provided fire support during the allied landing of the southern landing force on Attu in May 1943 and Kitts was decorated with his second Legion of Merit for his service in the Aleutians. He was detached from Nevada in mid July 1943 and following the nomination for promotion to the flag rank by President Franklin D. Roosevelt, he was promoted to the temporary rank of rear admiral. Kitts was subsequently ordered to Washington, D.C., and assumed duty as assistant to chief of Bureau of Ordnance, his Academy classmate, now Vice Admiral George F. Hussey Jr.

While in this capacity, Kitts was co-responsible for the procurement, storage, and deployment of all naval weapons and remained in that capacity until the end of August 1945. He distinguished himself in this assignment and received his third Legion of Merit and was appointed Honorary Commander of the Order of the British Empire by the United Kingdom.

== Postwar service ==
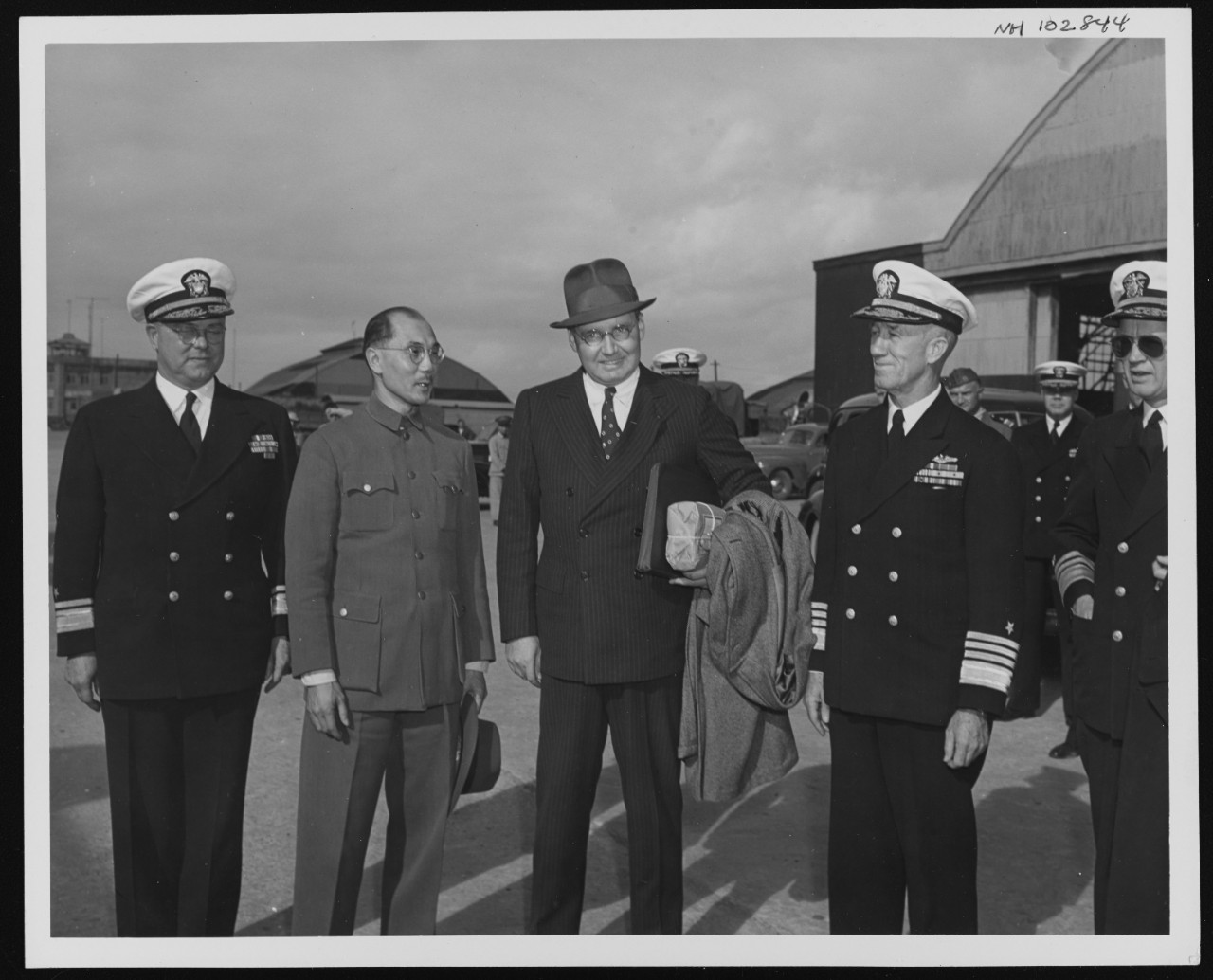
Kitts (1st from left) with Under Secretary of the Navy W. John Kenney (center) and Admiral Charles M. Cooke Jr. in Shanghai, China on November 9, 1946.

Following the war, Kitts was ordered back to the Pacific Theater and assumed command of Cruiser Division Three, operating off the cost of North China. He also held additional duty as Commander, Task Force 71 and took part in the repatriation of the former Japanese Military personnel and refugees. For this service, Kitts was decorated with Order of the Cloud and Banner by Chiang Kai-shek.

He returned to the United States in October 1947 and relieved Rear Admiral Ingolf N. Kiland as Commander, Training Command, Pacific with headquarters in San Diego, California. While in this capacity, Kitts was responsible for the training of officer and enlisted personnel of the Pacific Fleet and supervised the training facilities in San Diego, Long Beach, Pearl Harbor, Guam, China and Japan. During his tenure, over one hundred thousand men were trained.

Kitts was ordered to the Naval Proving Ground Dahlgren, Virginia, in September 1949 and remained in that ordnance assignment until June 1951.

== Retirement ==
Kitts retired on June 30, 1951, after 35 years of active service and was advanced to the rank of vice admiral on the retired list for having been specially commended in combat. He then worked for General Electric (G.E.) as Manager of ordnance engineering division in Schenectady, New York, which was established in order to deal with Army and Navy installation work. Kitts served in this capacity until June 1955, when he was promoted to the capacity of acting general manager of General Electric Atomic Power equipment department.

While in this capacity, he was responsible for the design, development, manufacture and marketing of G.E.'s commercial atomic power products. Kitts was relieved from his temporary assignment in March 1956 and appointed Manager of the Atomic Products planning study for G.E.'s Atomic Power equipment department. He also held additional duty as a member of the Board of Directors of American Standards Association and a member of the Nuclear Standards Board.

Vice Admiral Willard A. Kitts III died of brain tumor on November 21, 1964, aged 70, at Bethesda Naval Hospital, Maryland, and was buried at Arlington National Cemetery, Virginia, with full military honors. His wife, Fredrika B. Jones, is buried beside him. They had three children, sons Willard Frederick Kitts (1920–1982) and David Burlingame Kitts (1923–2010), and a daughter Susanna Kitts Sherwood (1925–2019).

== Military decorations ==
Here is the ribbon bar of Vice Admiral Willard A. Kitts:

1st Row	Navy Cross		Legion of Merit with two 5/16" Gold Stars
2nd Row	Purple Heart	World War I Victory Medal with Fleet Clasp	American Defense Service Medal with Base Clasp
3rd Row	Asiatic-Pacific Campaign Medal with four 3/16 inch bronze service stars	American Campaign Medal	World War II Victory Medal
4th Row	Navy Occupation Service Medal	China Service Medal	National Defense Service Medal
5th Row	Distinguished Marksmanship Ribbon	Honorary Commanders of the Order of the British Empire	Chinese Order of the Cloud and Banner, 4th Class

== See also ==
- Battle of Tassafaronga – 1942 naval battle in the Pacific theater of World War II

Military offices
Preceded by C. Turner Joy	Commander, Naval Proving Ground Dahlgren; September 1949 – June 1951	Succeeded by Irving T. Duke
Preceded by Howard F. Kingman	Commanding officer, USS Nevada; January 25, 1943 – July 21, 1943	Succeeded by Powell M. Rhea
