= Bertram J. Rodgers =

American Vice admiral

Bertram Joseph Rodgers
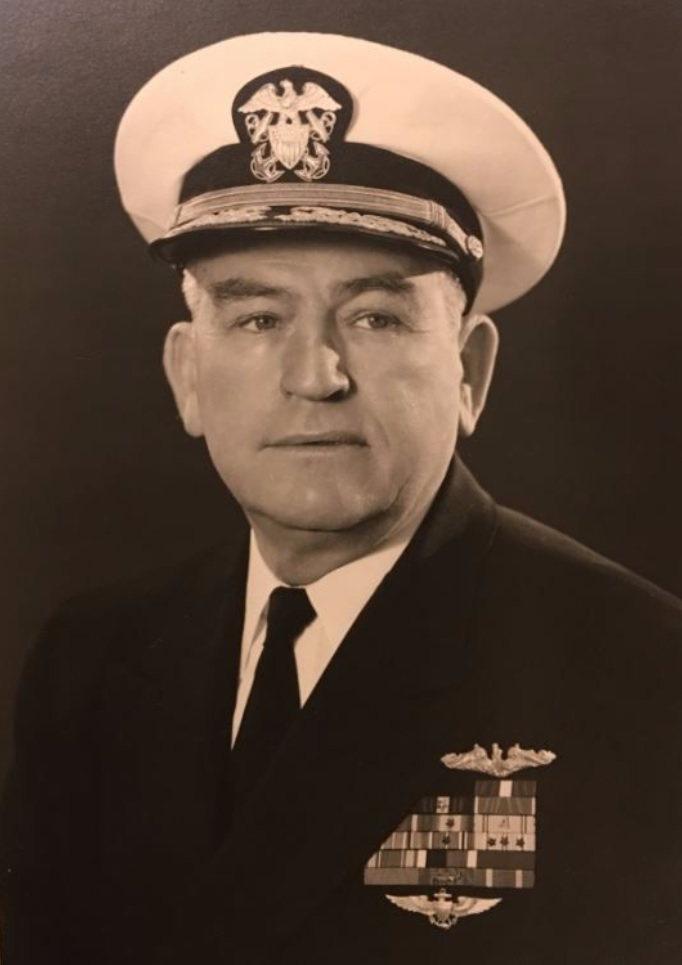
- VADM Bertram J. Rodgers, USN
- Born: March 18, 1894; Knoxville, Pennsylvania, US
- Died: November 30, 1983 (aged 89); Coronado, California, US
- Military career
- Allegiance: United States
- Branch: United States Navy
- Service years: 1916–1956
- Rank: Vice admiral
- Nickname: "Bert"
- Commands: U.S. Naval Forces Germany; 12th Naval District; Amphibious Forces, Pacific Fleet; USS Salt Lake City; USS Selfridge; USS Blakeley
- Conflicts: World War I World War II: Battle of the Komandorski Islands; Operation Dragoon; Battle of Iwo Jima; Battle of Okinawa
- Awards: Navy Cross; Distinguished Service Medal (2); Legion of Merit

Bertram Joseph Rodgers (March 18, 1894 – November 30, 1983) was a highly decorated vice admiral in the United States Navy during World War II. He received his Navy Cross as captain of USS Salt Lake City in the battle of the Komandorski islands, during the Aleutian Islands Campaign.

Rodgers later served as commander of Amphibious Forces, Pacific Fleet, commandant of 12th Naval District in San Francisco and commander of U.S. Naval Forces Germany. He completed his career as president of Permanent General Court Martial in 1956.

== Early career ==
Rodgers was born on March 18, 1894, in Knoxville, Pennsylvania, as the son of a glass decorator Linus James Rodgers and his wife Clara E. Werling. He had seven siblings and completed the St. George's Catholic School and graduated from the South Pittsburgh High School in June 1912. Rodgers subsequently received an appointment to the United States Naval Academy at Annapolis, Maryland, from 32nd District and entered the academy as midshipman in June that year.

While at the academy, he was active in varsity baseball team for all four years and won the Naval Academy "N" in each of the four years. Among other duties, Rodgers served as midshipman-ensign and ordnance officer of the Second Cadet Battalion under his classmate and future admiral, Ralph E. Davison, and also was active in Hop Committee.

Among his classmates were several future distinguished general officers, including Frank E. Beatty Jr., Russell S. Berkey, Ralph E. Davison, Calvin T. Durgin, C. Turner Joy, Gerald F. Bogan, John E. Wilkes, Homer L. Grosskopf, Osborne B. Hardison, George F. Hussey Jr., Robert Carney, Oscar R. Cauldwell, William Fechteler, Don P. Moon, Denis L. Ryan, Samuel P. Ginder, Charles P. Cecil, Willard A. Kitts, Andrew C. McFall, Henry M. Mullinnix, Thorvald A. Solberg, Maurice G. Holmes, Gilbert C. Hoover, Arnold W. Jacobsen or Arthur W. Radford.

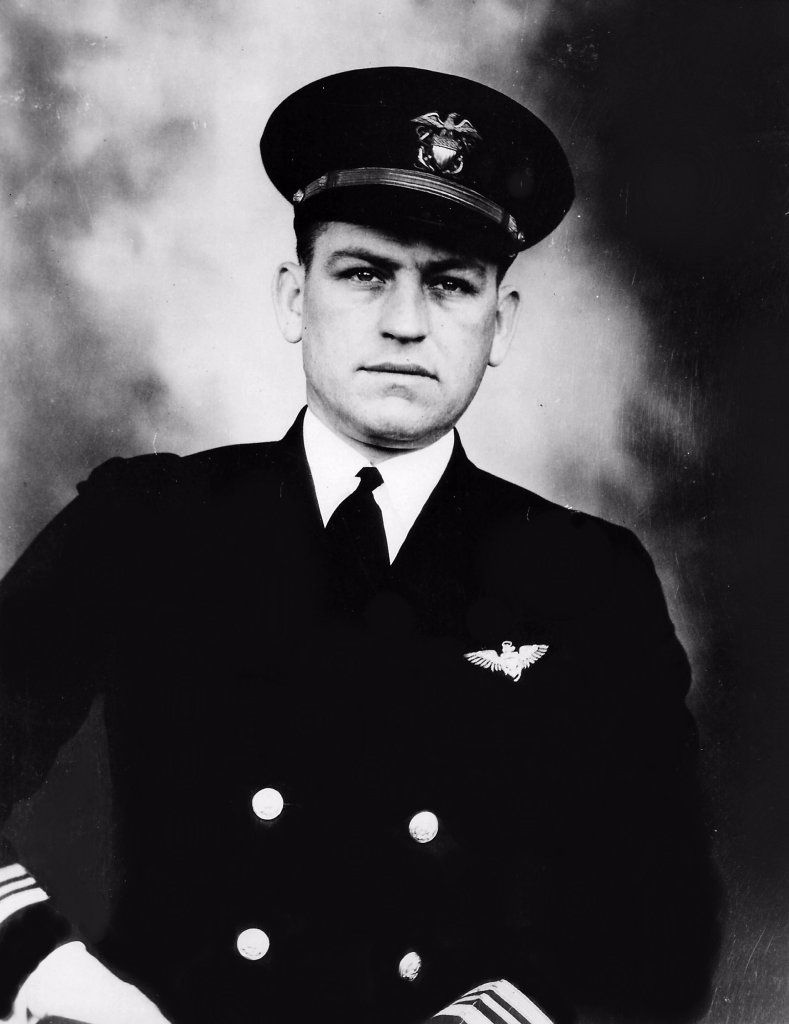
Rodgers as lieutenant commander in late 1920s.

Rodgers graduated with Bachelor of Science degree in June 1916 and was commissioned ensign at the time. He was subsequently attached to the battleship USS South Carolina, participated in the patrol cruises and convoy escort duties in the Atlantic Ocean during World War I and made stops in Cuba, the Panama Canal, and New Orleans. While aboard South Carolina, Rodgers was promoted consecutively to the temporary ranks of Lieutenant (junior grade) and lieutenant. He also befriended with future fleet admiral Chester Nimitz, who served then as ship's executive officer.

He was detached in June 1919 and ordered to the Naval Submarine Base New London, Connecticut, for submarine training, which he aboard the stations ship, USS Fulton one month later and spent next three months aboard the training submarine USS H-4 along the West Coast of the United States. Rodgers subsequently commanded the submarines USS H-8 and USS R-8 during the patrols off the coast of San Pedro and Santa Catalina Island until June 1923, when he was sent to the Union Iron Works in San Francisco, California, for duty in connection with fitting out of submarine USS S-41. He was promoted to the permanent rank of lieutenant on July 1, 1920.

Rodgers was detached before that submarine was commissioned and ordered to Coco Solo submarine base in the Panama Canal Zone in October 1923. He served as engineer and repair officer until September 1925, when he returned to the United States for duty at Portsmouth Navy Yard in connection with fitting out of submarine USS Bonita. Upon the commissioning of that vessel, Rodgers was appointed an executive officer under Lieutenant Commander Charles A. Lockwood and participated in the patrolling the Atlantic shores and Caribbean until May 1927. Rodgers was promoted to lieutenant commander on October 2, 1926.

He was subsequently ordered to the Naval Air Station Lakehurst, New Jersey, for lighter-than-air instruction, which he completed on June 26, 1928, and was designated Naval aviator. Rodgers then served successively aboard the airships Los Angeles, Akron and Macon until June 1934, when he was appointed commanding officer of destroyer, USS Blakeley, succeeding lieutenant commander Glenn B. Davis in that capacity.

After serving with Blakely with the Scouting Fleet, Rodgers returned to Panama Canal Zone and assumed duty as port captain, Balboa Naval Facility, in October 1935. While in this capacity, he was promoted to commander on July 1, 1936, and returned to sea in June 1938 as commander of destroyer USS Selfridge.

Rodgers commanded his destroyer during the Fleet Problem XXI in April 1940, which focused on the defense of the Hawaiian area. He was succeeded by Leland P. Lovette on May 17, 1940, and ordered to the Naval War College at Newport, Rhode Island, where he completed Senior course in May 1941. Following the graduation, he was ordered to Washington, D.C., and attached to the War Plans Division, Navy Department.

== World War II ==
Following the United States entry into World War II, Rodgers was promoted to the rank of captain on January 1, 1942, and transferred to the headquarters, Commander-in-Chief, United States Fleet in Washington, D.C., where he served under Admiral Ernest J. King until January 1943. Upon request to be assigned for combat duty, Rodgers was ordered to Hawaii, where he was appointed commanding officer of the heavy cruiser USS Salt Lake City.

=== Aleutian Islands ===
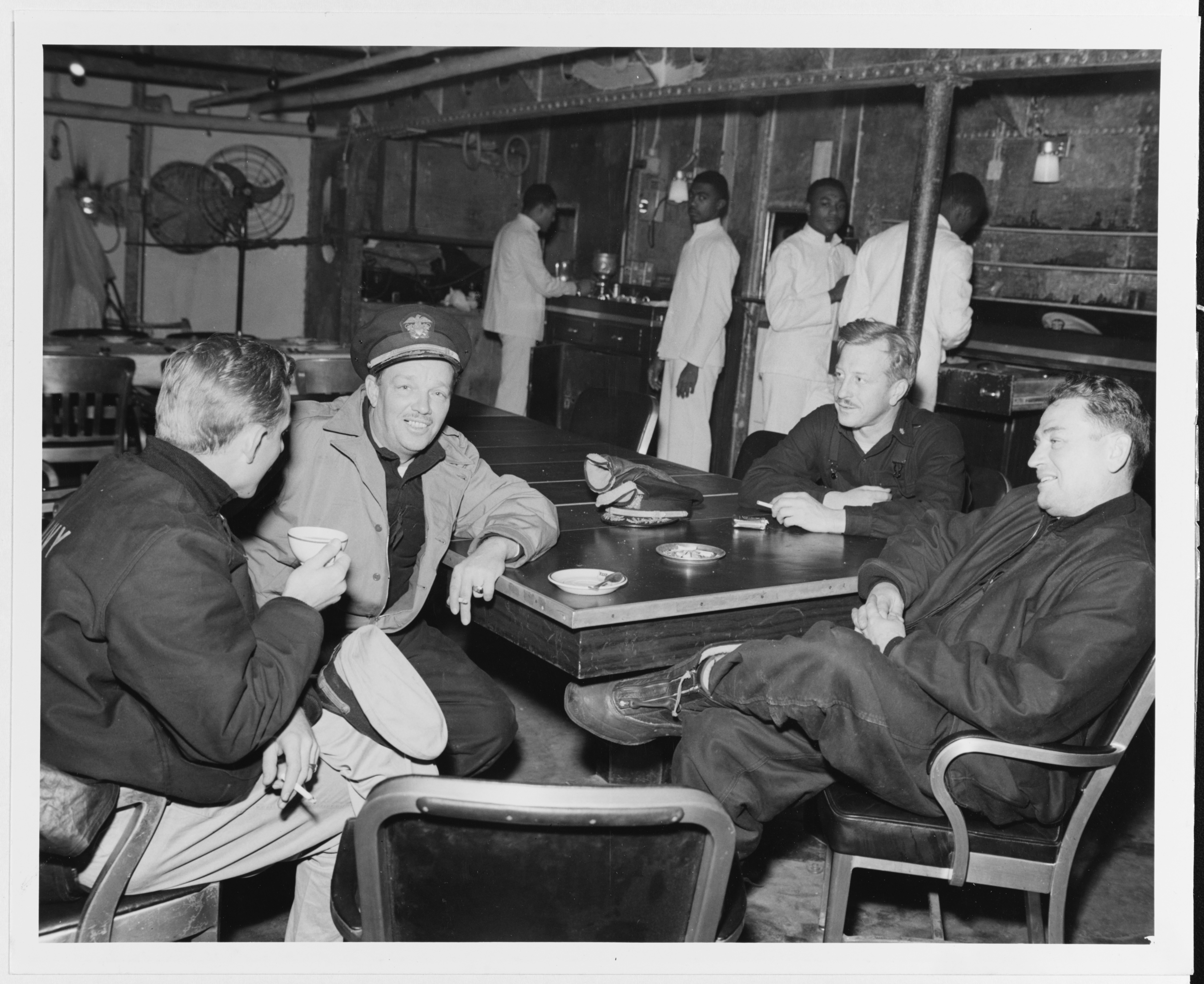
Rodgers (right) with other officers of USS Salt Lake City after the Battle of the Komandorski Islands, March 26, 1943.

In early 1943, Japanese forces sent a supply convoy to reinforce their forces on the Aleutian Islands near the coast of Alaska. The United States responded by sending a Cruiser Division 3, consisted of the heavy cruiser Salt Lake City, the light cruiser Richmond and the destroyers Coghlan, Bailey, Dale and Monaghan, under Rear Admiral Charles McMorris.

The U.S. forces met Japanese ships near the Komandorski islands on March 26, 1943, and during a 3 1/2-hour engagement with an enemy force of far greater strength, Rodgers handled his cruiser with such excellent judgment and skill that she was able to inflict severe damage on one heavy cruiser and lesser damage on another heavy, and a light cruiser. He was decorated with the Navy Cross, the United States military's second-highest decoration awarded for valor in combat. He also received his Navy Unit Commendation.

=== Southeast Asia ===
Rodgers commanded Salt Lake City until the beginning of September of that year, when he was promoted to the rank of commodore and appointed United States senior planning officer on the Joint Planning Staff, South East Asia Command, and senior United States naval officer in Southeast Asia. He was responsible jointly with the senior British Army planner for the formulation of plans for operations in Southeast Asia, utilizing United States, Chinese, British, and Colonial troops.

Rodgers served under Admiral Louis Mountbatten until the end of January 1944 and received Legion of Merit for his service.

=== Operation Dragoon ===
Rodgers was subsequently promoted to the temporary rank of rear admiral on January 28, 1944, and ordered to the Mediterranean, where he assumed duty as commander of Task Group Two, Eighth Amphibious Force with additional duty as commander, Task Force 85 "Delta Force" under Admiral Henry K. Hewitt. His Task Force consisted of Force Flagship Group (Flagship – USS Biscayne; destroyer USS Forrest, and seaplane one fighter-director tender); Transport Group (six transport ships, two Attack freighters, five destroyers, three British troop ships); Assault Group (beach assault landing crafts); Gunfire Support Group (one battleship, one light cruiser, two French light cruisers, eight destroyers, three French destroyers); Minesweeper Group (eight minesweepers) and Combat and Firefighting Group (seven fleet tugs).

He commanded his task force during the Operation Dragoon, the Allied invasion of the Southern France in August 1944, where his command assisted in landing of assault troops, supplies and mechanized equipment of the 7th Army, mostly Major General William Eagle's 45th Infantry (Thunderbirds) Division on a stretch of beach between Pointe des Sardineux and Pointe de la Garonne. His efficient direction of unloading operations of convoys were contributing factors in sustaining the rapid advance of Allied ground forces into enemy-held territory. Rodgers was subsequently decorated with Navy Distinguished Service Medal for his service and was entitled to wear the Navy Unit Commendation for USS Biscay service during the Operation Dragoon. He was also made British Honorary Commander of the Order of the Bath and received Legion of Honour and French Croix de Guerre 1939–1945 with Palm.

=== Pacific Theater ===
Rodgers and his command were ordered to the Pacific theater of operations in December 1944 and his unit was now redesignated Amphibious Group ELEVEN. He assumed additional duty as commander of Battleship Division 3 and led his command during the Iwo Jima Campaign in February–March 1945 and Battle of Okinawa in May–June of that year. In both campaigns, troops under his command were responsible for the support of the landings. Despite repeated attempts by hostile suicide boats to strike his ships and incessant attacks by enemy aircraft, Rodgers directed the units under his command in supporting minesweeping and underwater demolition operations in preparation for the main assaults on objectives; supported landings and subsequent advances of American troops; and provided scheduled bombardments in support of Allied daily attacks against each Japanese stronghold in turn. He was decorated with second Navy Distinguished Service Medal for his service in the Pacific theater.

== Postwar career ==
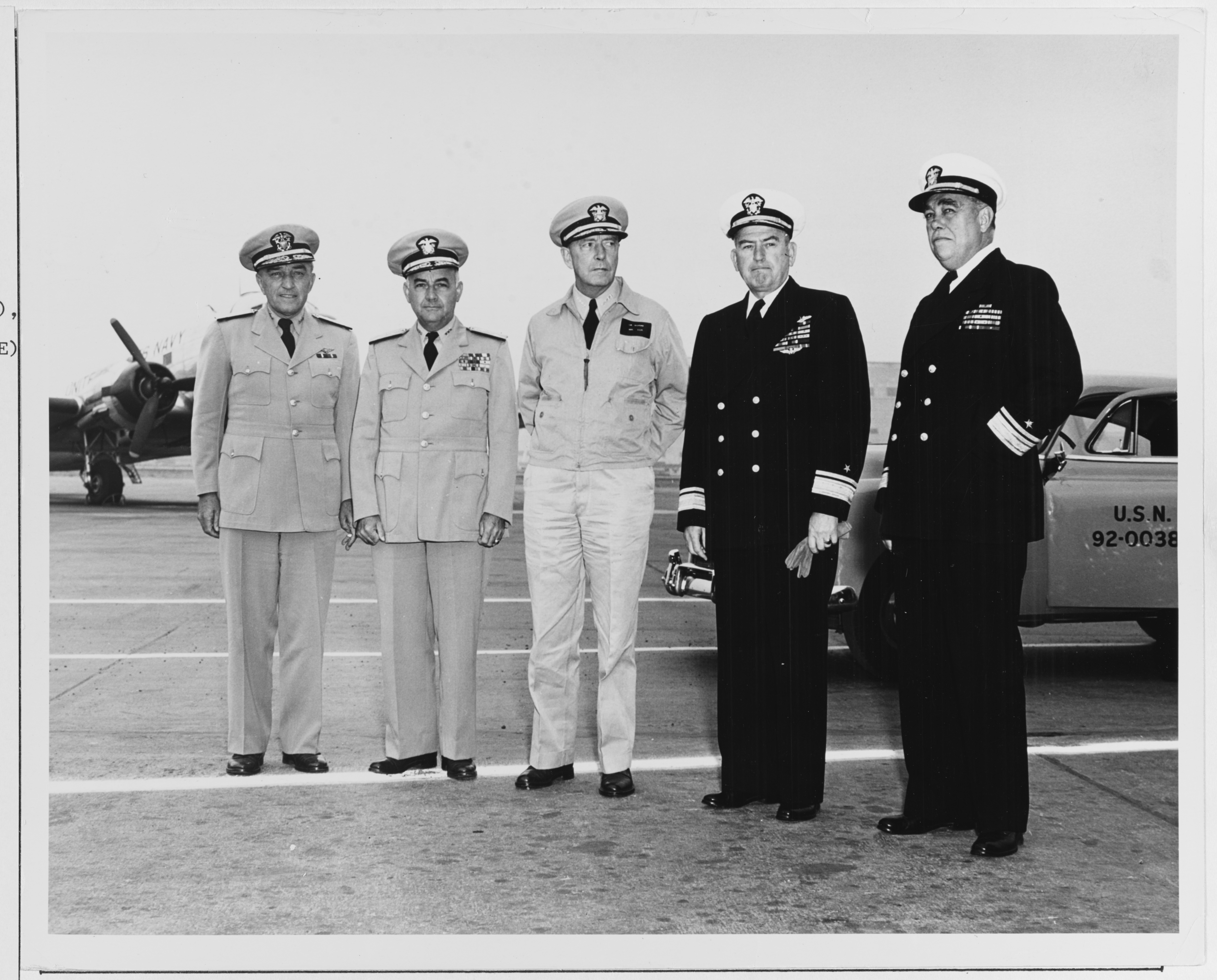
Admirals at Moffet Field in July 1951, from left to right: Thomas L. Sprague, Arthur D. Struble, Arthur W. Radford, Rodgers and Thomas R. Cooley.

Following the war, Rodgers remained in Pacific and his command was transferred to the United States Fifth Fleet under Admiral Raymond A. Spruance for participation in the Invasion of Japan. Following the Surrender of Japan, the main goal for his forces was changed to occupation and forces landed at Kure, Hiroshima, Matsuyama areas of southern Honshu and Shikoku, Japan.

Rodgers was appointed commander, Amphibian Group 3 in February 1946 and took part in the Seventh Fleet's repatriation operations of Chinese, Koreans, and Japanese and in transporting Chinese Nationalists troops to North China and Manchuria. For his service in this capacity, he was decorated with Chinese Order of the Sacred Tripod, 4th Class by Chiang Kai-shek.

Following his return stateside in July 1946, Rodgers was appointed commander of Amphibious Group One and participated in the first full-scale peacetime amphibious training exercises conducted off the coast of Southern California in November and December that year. At the end of his tenure, he witnessed the sinking of his World War II ship, USS Salt Lake City, which was used as a target hull on May 25, 1948.

He was subsequently appointed Amphibious Forces, Pacific Fleet, in April 1948 and took part in the observation tour during the annual resupply expedition to Naval Petroleum Reserve Nr. 4 on Alaska. Rodgers held that command until February 1952.

Rodgers was appointed commandant of 12th Naval District with headquarters in San Francisco, California, and administered all navy units in the following geographic areas Colorado; Utah; Nevada except Clark County; the northern part of California, including counties of San Luis Obispo, Kings, Tulare, Inyo, and all counties north thereof.

He was ordered to Europe in March 1954 and commanded U.S. Naval Forces Germany until November 1955, when he was ordered to the United States and attached back to the 12th Naval District. Rodgers then served as president of Permanent General Court Martial until his retirement on April 1, 1956. He was advanced to the rank of vice admiral on the retired list for having been specially commended in combat.

== Retirement ==
Following his retirement from the Navy, Rodgers settled in Coronado, California, where he was active in the Sacred Heart Catholic Church Holy Name Society and the Navy League of the United States. He died of heart attack at Coronado Hospital on November 30, 1983.

His wife, Marie Fischer Rodgers, died in 1981, They had three sons, Bertram Joseph Jr., Paul Stephen, and James Richard, and a daughter, Mrs. Marie E. Rodgers Casey. His son, Bertram J. Rodgers Jr., worked as a consultant for an electronics company in Fremont, California, until his retirement in 2016.

== Military decorations ==
Here is the ribbon bar of Vice Admiral Bertram J. Rodgers:

Submarine Warfare insignia
1st Row	Navy Cross		
2nd Row	Navy Distinguished Service Medal with one 5/16" Gold Star	Legion of Merit	Navy Unit Commendation with one star
3rd Row	World War I Victory Medal with Fleet Clasp	American Defense Service Medal with "A" Device	Asiatic-Pacific Campaign Medal with three 3/16 inch bronze service stars
4th Row	European-African-Middle Eastern Campaign Medal with one 3/16 inch bronze service star	American Campaign Medal	World War II Victory Medal
5th Row	Navy Occupation Service Medal	National Defense Service Medal	British Honorary Commander of the Order of the Bath
6th Row	Officier of the Légion d'honneur	French Croix de Guerre 1939–1945 with Palm	Chinese Order of the Sacred Tripod, 4th Class
Naval Aviator Badge
