= Walter Schindler =

Walter Gabriel Schindler
- Born: December 10, 1897; New Glarus, Wisconsin
- Died: April 3, 1991 (aged 93); Sarasota, Florida
- Relatives: S. A. Schindler (father)
- Military career
- Allegiance: United States
- Branch: United States Navy
- Service years: 1917−1959
- Rank: Vice admiral
- Nickname: "Butch"
- Service number: 57173
- Commands: Eighth Naval District; Naval Forces Germany; Naval Ordnance Laboratory; USS Topeka (CL-67); USS Finch (AM-9)
- Conflicts: World War I World War II: Marshalls–Gilberts raids; Salamaua–Lae raid; Battle of the Coral Sea; Battle of Midway; Battle of Guadalcanal; Battle of the Eastern Solomons; Korean War
- Awards: Navy Cross; Silver Star; Legion of Merit (2); Navy Commendation Medal

Walter Gabriel Schindler (December 10, 1897 – April 3, 1991) was a highly decorated career officer in the United States Navy, who ultimately achieved the rank of vice admiral. While a commander during World War II, Schindler received a Navy Cross and a Silver Star for his service aboard the USS Yorktown, including during the Battle of the Coral Sea. He was transferred stateside later and commanded Naval Ordnance Laboratory for the duration of the war.

Following the war, Schindler was promoted to rear admiral and commanded Cruiser Division Three during the later stage of Korean War. He later served as the last commander, Naval Forces Germany, and completed his service as commandant, Eighth Naval District in New Orleans, Louisiana.

== Early career ==
Walter G. Schindler was born on December 10, 1897, in New Glarus, Wisconsin, to S. A. Schindler and Anna Schindler. His father became a member of the Wisconsin State Assembly and served as Deputy State Treasurer at the time of his death. Young Walter graduated from the St. John's Military Academy in Delafield, Wisconsin, in summer of 1916 and attended the University of Wisconsin in Madison for one year, before received an appointment to the United States Naval Academy at Annapolis, Maryland, in June 1917.

While at the academy, Schindler was active in the track squad; also served on the Lucky Bag staff and was designated an Expert rifleman. During the summer of 1918 while still at the academy, he was assigned as Midshipman to the battleship Missouri operating with the Atlantic Fleet. Schindler later resumed his studies and finally graduated with Bachelor of Science degree on June 3, 1921, and was commissioned ensign on that date.

Following his graduation, Schindler was assigned to the battleship Tennessee operating with the Pacific Fleet. He served in that capacity until June 1924, when he was promoted to lieutenant (junior grade) and transferred to the destroyer Robert Smith, cruising along the west coast of the United States and Mexico and later visiting ports in Samoa, New Zealand and Australia with the Battle Force, Pacific Fleet.

In May 1927, Schindler was promoted to lieutenant and ordered to the Naval Postgraduate School, then located at Annapolis, Maryland, where he completed a course in ordnance engineering there. He was subsequently ordered to the Washington Navy Yard for torpedo instruction, which he completed in May 1930. Schindler subsequently rejoined the battleship Tennessee and participated in patrol duty with the Pacific Fleet until March 1933. Schindler was then transferred to Washington, D.C., and joined the Bureau of Ordnance under Rear Admiral Harold R. Stark. While in Washington, Schindler completed the Naval War College correspondence course in strategy and tactics.

After two years in that capacity, Schindler was transferred to the Far East and assigned to the destroyer Whipple, the flagship of Destroyer Division Thirteen within the Asiatic Fleet. Following service aboard Whipple off the coast of the Philippines and China, Schindler assumed his first command at sea, the minesweeper Finch.

Upon promotion to lieutenant commander in June 1937, Schindler was appointed gunnery officer aboard the cruiser Augusta, the flagship of Commander-in-Chief, Asiatic Fleet, Admiral Harry E. Yarnell. He was also Commander, Mine Division Three, and served in Chinese waters until May 1940, when he was ordered back to the United States.

Upon his return stateside, Schindler rejoined the Bureau of Ordnance, now under Rear Admiral William R. Furlong and served with the Fire Control section for more than a year. He returned to sea in July 1941 as a recently promoted commander and gunnery and training officer on the staff of Commander, Cruisers, Scouting Force, under Rear Admiral John H. Newton.

== World War II ==
=== Battles of Coral Sea, Midway and Solomons ===
Following the Attack on Pearl Harbor and the United States entry into World War II, Schindler was still on the staff of Commander, Cruisers, Scouting Force, now under Rear admiral Frank J. Fletcher. His command was later transformed into Commander, Cruisers, Pacific Fleet, and designated Task Force 17 (TF17). TF17 escorted a convoy carrying Marine reinforcements to American Samoa in early January 1942 before participating in Marshalls–Gilberts and Salamaua–Lae raids one month later.

Upon the Japanese landing on New Guinea in late January 1942, the Japanese switched their focus to the capture the town of Port Moresby, which could be use as a future naval and air base for invasion to Australia. The US learned of the Japanese plan through signals intelligence and sent two US Navy carrier task forces and a joint Australian-American cruiser force to oppose the offensive, under the overall command of Admiral Fletcher.

Japanese forces invaded and occupied Tulagi on May 3–4. Schindler volunteered as a free gunner in an airplane of Scouting Squadron Five (VS-5) in three successive attacks against Japanese forces in order to get more accurate information about the enemy forces and their disposition. Three days later, Fletcher's units fought the Japanese fleet in the Battle of the Coral Sea and sank the light carrier Japanese aircraft carrier Shōhō. Schindler volunteered again as free gunner in a Douglas SBD Dauntless (SBD) dive bomber of future fighter ace Swede Vejtasa during the attack on Shōhō and filmed the naval battle unfolding below him. Schindler's footage was later used to develop future strategies for aircraft carrier combat.

On May 8, Schindler flew as a gunner with Lieutenant Turner F. Caldwell Jr. (Scouting Squadron Five's executive officer) in the attack on the carrier Shokaku. During their run, the SBDs were beset by Zero fighters. Schindler claimed one destroyed. For his service during the Battle of the Coral Sea, he was awarded the Navy Cross, the second highest decoration for valor. Schindler was considered the first American serviceman to have shot down a Zero from the rear seat of a Navy dive bomber.

Schindler then took part in the Battle of Midway on June 4–7, the invasion of Tulagi and Guadalcanal on August 7–9 and the Battle of the Eastern Solomons on August 24–25 and was promoted to the temporary rank of captain on June 20, 1942. Following the departure of Fletcher in November 1942, Schindler was appointed Chief of Staff and Aide of Task Force 11 (TF11), under recently promoted Rear Admiral DeWitt C. Ramsey.

After a reorganization of TF11 under new Rear Admiral Willis Augustus Lee, Schindler continued as Chief of Staff and Aide and took part of the naval operation off Baker Island, where TF11 provided air cover during the occupation of the island and the construction of an airfield there. Schindler also received the Silver Star and the Navy Commendation Ribbon for his service in Pacific.

=== Stateside duty ===
Schindler returned to the United States in November 1943 and was assigned to the headquarters of Twelfth Naval district in San Francisco, California. He served under Vice admiral John W. Greenslade there for few weeks before being transferred to Washington, D.C., for duty with the Naval Ordnance Laboratory, the Navy's research facility for Naval Ordnance. Schindler served as Officer-in-Charge of the Naval Ordnance Laboratory until October 1945 and was responsible for the design of the mines used extensively in the prosecution of the Pacific War. He also successfully promoted the construction of the White Oak research and development plant of the Bureau of Ordnance, energetically supporting the reforms necessary to make these and similar laboratories into well functioning establishments. For his service in this capacity, Schindler was decorated with Legion of Merit.

== Postwar service ==
In early November 1945, Schindler was ordered to San Pedro, Los Angeles, where he assumed command of the light cruiser USS Topeka which had just arrived from Pacific area. He supervised the ship's overhaul and sailed for Japan in early January 1946, arriving at Yokosuka before the end of month. Topeka then patrolled Japanese and Chinese waters, and Schindler returned to the US in July.

He started a course at the National War College in Washington, D.C., in September 1946 and completed it in June 1947. Schindler was subsequently transferred to the Office of the Chief of Naval Operations, before departing for Valparaíso, Chile, to become Chief of the Naval Mission there. While in this capacity, he was promoted to rear admiral on July 1, 1948, and received decorations from Chile and Peru.

In December 1949, Schindler returned to the US and reported as Assistant Chief of the Bureau of Ordnance for Research, and while in this capacity, he served as Deputy to Vice Admiral Albert G. Noble until the end of July 1950, when he returned to the Naval Ordnance Laboratory as its commanding officer.

=== Korean War ===
Schindler was transferred to the Far East in July 1952 and assumed command of Cruiser Division Three, composed of the heavy cruiser Bremerton; and the destroyers Allen M. Sumner, Moale, Purdy, and Ingraham. Schindler commanded his ships during the bombardment of the heavily defended east coast of Korea against enemy fortifications and facilities, resuilting in the destruction of industrial and supply centers, rail and highway bridges, vehicles, transportation junctions, and staging areas, including Kojo. For his service in Korea, he was decorated with his second Legion of Merit with Combat "V".

=== Later service ===
Upon his return stateside in August 1953, Schindler was transferred to Washington, D.C., and rejoined the Office of the Chief of Naval Operations, under Admiral Robert Carney, as Assistant Chief of Naval Operations (Fleet Operations and Readiness). In October 1955, he was transferred to Europe as Commander, United States Naval Forces Germany with headquarters in Heidelberg, where he was responsible for all American naval activities in Germany, including United States Naval Advanced Base, Bremerhaven, Rhine River Patrol, Medical Technical Unit Heidelberg, United States Navy Member Military Mission Potsdam, and Sub Headquarters Intelligence Detachment Berlin.

He served as the last commander of that command, before it was disbanded in July 1957 and he returned to the United States for new assignment. Schindler was subsequently transferred to New Orleans, Louisiana, for duty as Commandant, Eighth Naval District, which included the areas of Texas, Louisiana, Oklahoma, Arkansas, and New Mexico. His command included the Naval Reserve Training Center in Galveston, Texas; Naval and Marine Corps Training Center in Tulsa, Oklahoma; Naval Reserve Training Center at Abilene, Texas; Navy Reserve Surface Division, Navy Reserve Officer School, and Mobilization Unit and Marine Reserves in Amarillo, Texas.

== Post-Navy activities ==
Schindler held that command until October 1, 1959, when he retired from active duty completing 42 years of service. He was subsequently advanced to the rank of vice admiral on the retired list for having been specially commended in combat.

Following his retirement from the Navy, Schindler founded Project Alert, an organization designated to make the civilian population of the United States aware of the struggle with the Soviet Union and the consequences that would result if the United States should lose the Cold War. He served as Vice Chairman and Deputy of the Advisory Council on Naval Affairs under Admiral John W. Reeves Jr. and as a National Director of the Navy League in 1960-1961, before becoming a National Commissioner of the Freedoms Foundation.

Vice Admiral Walter G. Schindler died on April 3, 1991, aged 93, in Sarasota, Florida. He was survived by his second wife Mary Arline Steen (1908–1984). His first wife Flora B. Streiff died in 1944 at the age of 44.

== Decorations ==
Here is the ribbon bar of Vice Admiral Schindler:

1st Row	Navy Cross		Silver Star
2nd Row	Legion of Merit with Combat "V"	Navy Commendation Medal with Combat "V"	World War I Victory Medal with Atlantic Fleet Clasp
3rd Row	China Service Medal with service star	American Defense Service Medal with Fleet Clasp	American Campaign Medal
4th Row	Asiatic–Pacific Campaign Medal with one silver and four bronze 3/16 inch service stars	World War II Victory Medal	Navy Occupation Service Medal
5th Row	National Defense Service Medal	Korean Service Medal with two 3/16 inch service stars	United Nations Korea Medal
6th Row	Navy Rifle Marksmanship Ribbon	Navy Pistol Marksmanship Ribbon	Honorary Commander of the Order of the British Empire
7th Row	Chilean Military Medal, 1st Class	Peruvian Order of Naval Merit	Korean Presidential Unit Citation

== See also ==
- Frank J. Fletcher

Military offices
Preceded by John M. Higgins	Commandant, Eighth Naval District; August 1, 1957 - October 1, 1959	Succeeded by Frederick B. Warder
Preceded by Bertram J. Rodgers	Commander, United States Naval Forces Germany; October 12, 1955 - July 31, 1957	Succeeded by Command deactivated
