= Swede Vejtasa =

United States Navy Pilot and WW2 Ace (1914–2013)

Stanley W. Vejtasa
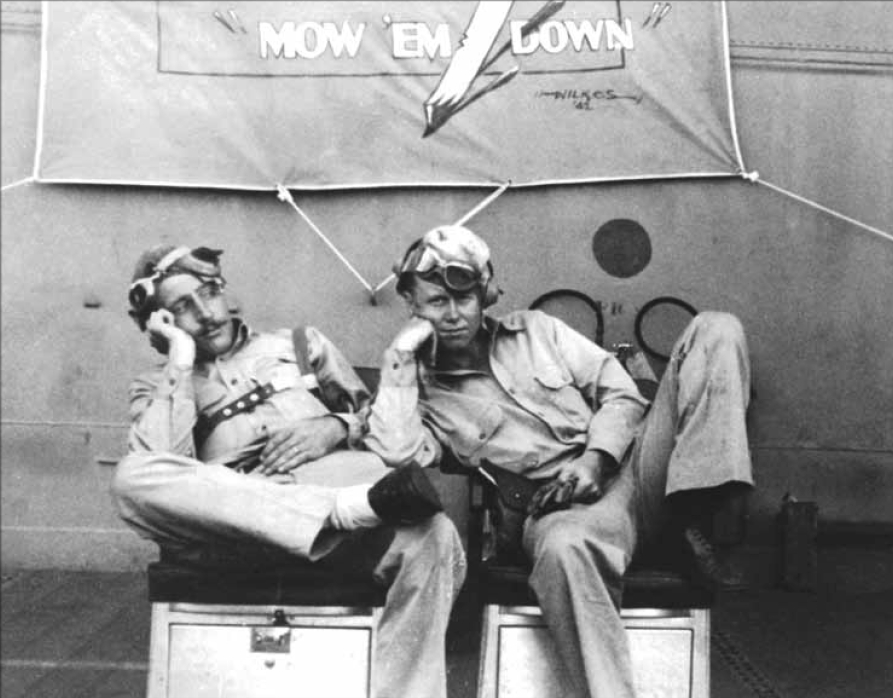
- Lieutenants Swede Vejtasa (right) and Dave Pollock of Fighting Squadron 10 aboard USS Enterprise in October 1942, shortly before the Battle of the Santa Cruz Islands
- Born: 27 July 1914; Paris, McCone County, Montana, US
- Died: 23 January 2013 (aged 98); Escondido, California, US
- Military career
- Allegiance: United States
- Branch: United States Navy
- Service years: 1937–1970
- Rank: Captain
- Nickname: Swede
- Commands: USS Firedrake; USS Constellation; Naval Air Station Miramar
- Conflicts: World War II; Battle of the Coral Sea; Battle of the Santa Cruz Islands; Korean War
- Awards: Navy Cross (3); Legion of Merit; Bronze Star (2); Meritorious Service Medal

Stanley Winfield "Swede" Vejtasa (27 July 1914 – 23 January 2013) was a United States Navy career officer and World War II flying ace. During the Battle of the Santa Cruz Islands, he was credited with downing seven Japanese aircraft in one mission, becoming an "ace in a day".

== Early life ==
Vejtasa was born to Czech-Norwegian parents at an isolated homestead in Montana on July 27, 1914. He attended Montana State College, before transferring to the University of Montana.

== Military career ==
He joined the Navy in 1937 and became a Naval Aviator on 13 July 1939. Commissioned an ensign in August, he was first assigned to Scouting Squadron Five (VS-5) aboard the aircraft carrier USS Yorktown that same month, flying the Douglas SBD Dauntless dive bomber.

=== World War II ===
After the United States entered World War II, then Lieutenant (junior grade) Vejtasa attacked three Japanese "aircraft tenders or transports", scoring a direct hit on one of them "near Salamaua and Lae, New Guinea", on 10 March 1942, for which he was awarded his first Navy Cross.

During the Battle of the Coral Sea, he and several other dive bomber pilots sank the Japanese light aircraft carrier Shōhō on 7 May 1942. Walter Schindler, the staff gunnery officer and future vice admiral, filmed the day's strike as Vejtasa's temporary rear gunner. The next day, while flying in defense of the American task force, Vejtasa claimed to have shot down three Mitsubishi A6M Zeros, despite flying a much slower Dauntless dive bomber. In fact, Japanese records show that no Zeros were lost. For his actions during the battle, he was awarded his second Navy Cross.

Vejtasa was transferred to fighters, piloting the Grumman F4F Wildcat, and was assigned to the newly formed Fighting Squadron 10, under Lieutenant Commander James H. Flatley, aboard USS Enterprise. During the Battle of the Santa Cruz Islands, he was credited with downing seven enemy aircraft in one mission – first two Aichi D3A "Val" dive bombers attacking USS Hornet, then five Nakajima B5N "Kate" torpedo bombers targeting Enterprise – becoming an "ace in a day". (Postwar analysis confirmed two dive bombers and two torpedo bombers.) Lieutenant Vejtasa was awarded his third Navy Cross for this achievement. Seventy years later, an attempt to upgrade this to the Medal of Honor was denied. He is the only World War II carrier pilot awarded the Navy Cross "for both dive bombing and aerial combat."

He left Flying Squadron 10 in May 1943 and returned to the United States to serve as a flight instructor at Naval Air Station Atlantic City. He saw no further combat. At the end of the war, his tally was 10.25 victories, including a quarter shared credit for a Kawanishi H6K "Mavis" flying boat on 13 November 1942.

=== Post-war ===
Vejtasa remained in the Navy after the end of the war and served in the Korean War as air officer aboard USS Essex from 1951 to 1953. He commanded the ammunition ship USS Firedrake from July 1959 to August 1960 and the aircraft carrier USS Constellation from November 1962 to November 1963. He received the Legion of Merit for his work as Commander Fleet Air, Miramar, from 15 August 1965 to 7 June 1968. He retired on 1 July 1970 as a captain.

== Personal life ==
Vejtasa and his wife Irene had three children.

Vejtasa died on January 23, 2013. In accordance with his wishes, he was cremated and his ashes were scattered at sea.

== Awards and decorations ==
He was also awarded two Bronze Stars, the Meritorious Service Medal and the Navy Commendation Medal and was inducted into the Carrier Aviation Hall of Fame in 1987.

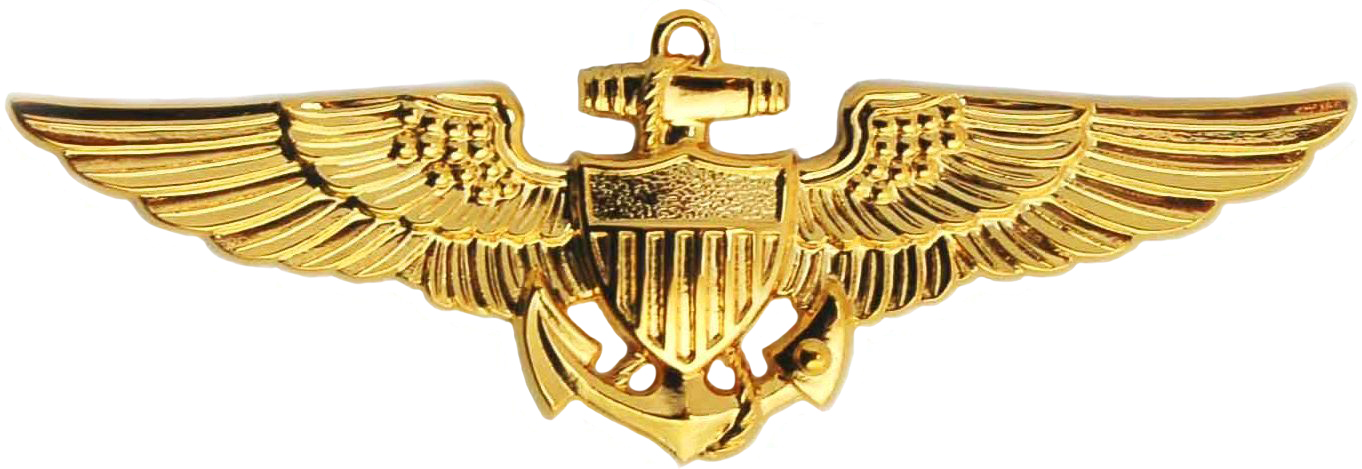

Naval Aviator Badge
Navy Cross w/ two 5/16" Gold Stars
Legion of Merit	Bronze Star Medal w/ "V" device and one 5/16" Gold Star	Meritorious Service Medal
Navy Commendation Medal w/ "V" device and one 5/16" Gold Star	Combat Action Ribbon	Navy Presidential Unit Citation
Navy Unit Commendation	China Service Medal	American Defense Service Medal w/ bronze "A" Device
American Campaign Medal	Asiatic-Pacific Campaign Medal w/ one 3/16" silver star and two 3/16" bronze stars	World War II Victory Medal
Navy Occupation Service Medal w/ 'Japan' clasp	National Defense Service Medal w/ one 3/16" bronze star	Korean Service Medal w/ three 3/16" bronze stars
Republic of Korea Presidential Unit Citation	United Nations Service Medal for Korea	Korean War Service Medal

=== 1st Navy Cross citation ===

Lieutenant (junior grade) Stanley Winfield Vejtasa
U.S. Navy
Date Of Action: March 10, 1942

The President of the United States of America takes pleasure in presenting the Navy Cross to Lieutenant, Junior Grade Stanley Winfield Vejtasa, United States Navy, for extraordinary heroism in operations against the enemy while serving as Pilot of a carrier-based Navy Scouting Plane in Scouting Squadron FIVE (VS-5), attached to the U.S.S. YORKTOWN (CV-5), in action against enemy Japanese forces near Salamaua and Lae, New Guinea, on 10 March 1942. In the face of heavy anti-aircraft fire, Lieutenant, Junior Grade, Vejtasa dived and skillfully attacked one of three Japanese aircraft tenders or transports and obtained a direct hit on one of the hostile vessels. By his superb airmanship and outstanding courage he contributed to the destruction of the three enemy ships and upheld the highest traditions of the United States Naval Service.

=== 2nd Navy Cross citation ===

Lieutenant (junior grade) Stanley Winfield Vejtasa
U.S. Navy
Date Of Action: May 4, 1942, May 7, 1942 and May 8, 1942

The President of the United States of America takes pleasure in presenting a Gold Star in lieu of a Second Award of the Navy Cross to Lieutenant, Junior Grade Stanley Winfield Vejtasa, United States Navy, for extraordinary heroism in operations against the enemy while serving as Pilot of a carrier-based Navy Scouting Plane in Scouting Squadron FIVE (VS-5), attached to the U.S.S. YORKTOWN (CV-5), in action against enemy Japanese forces at Tulagi Harbor on 4 May 1942, and in the Battle of the Coral Sea on 7 and 8 May 1942. On 4 May, Lieutenant, Junior Grade, Vejtasa participated in dive bombing attacks on the enemy in Tulagi Harbor which resulted in the sinking or damaging of at least eight enemy vessels. On 7 May, he took part in a dive bombing attack on an enemy carrier in the Coral Sea which resulted in the sinking of that vessel. On 8 May, while on anti-Torpedo Plane patrol, he engaged enemy bombing and Torpedo Planes heavily supported by fighters which attacked our forces. The attacks on 4 and 7 May were pressed home in the face of heavy anti-aircraft fire with no regard for personal safety. Lieutenant, Junior Grade, Vejtasa's conscientious devotion to duty and gallant self-command against formidable odds were in keeping with the highest traditions of the United States Naval Service.

=== 3rd Navy Cross citation ===

Lieutenant Stanley Winfield Vejtasa
U.S. Navy
Date Of Action: October 26, 1942

The President of the United States of America takes pleasure in presenting a Second Gold Star in lieu of a Third Award of the Navy Cross to Lieutenant Stanley Winfield Vejtasa, United States Navy, for extraordinary heroism in operations against the enemy while serving as Pilot of a carrier-based Navy Fighter Plane and leader of a Combat Air patrol of four fighters of Fighting Squadron TEN (VF-10), attached to the U.S.S. ENTERPRISE (CV-6), during the engagement with enemy Japanese naval and air forces near the Santa Cruz Islands on 26 October 1942. As great numbers of enemy dive bombers and Torpedo Planes launched a vicious attack upon his carrier, Lieutenant Vejtasa unhesitatingly challenged and shot down two Japanese dive bombers and then gallantly led his patrol in an attack on a group of enemy Torpedo Planes with such daring aggressiveness that the formation was completely broken and three of the hostile bombers jettisoned their torpedoes as they fled. Lieutenant Vejtasa then personally shot down five of the remaining Japanese planes, making a total of seven enemy aircraft destroyed in a single flight. His superb airmanship and indomitable fighting spirit were in keeping with the highest traditions of the United States Naval Service.

== On television ==
Vejtasa's exploits in the Battle of the Coral Sea are part of the television series Dogfights episode "Long Odds", and he described his actions in the Battle of the Santa Cruz Islands on the American documentary series Battle 360° episode "Bloody Santa Cruz".

== Bibliography ==
- Edwards, Ted (15 June 2018). Seven at Santa Cruz: The Life of Fighter Ace Stanley "Swede" Vejtasa. Naval Institute Press. ISBN 978-1682472873.
