= Robert L. Ghormley =

United States Navy admiral

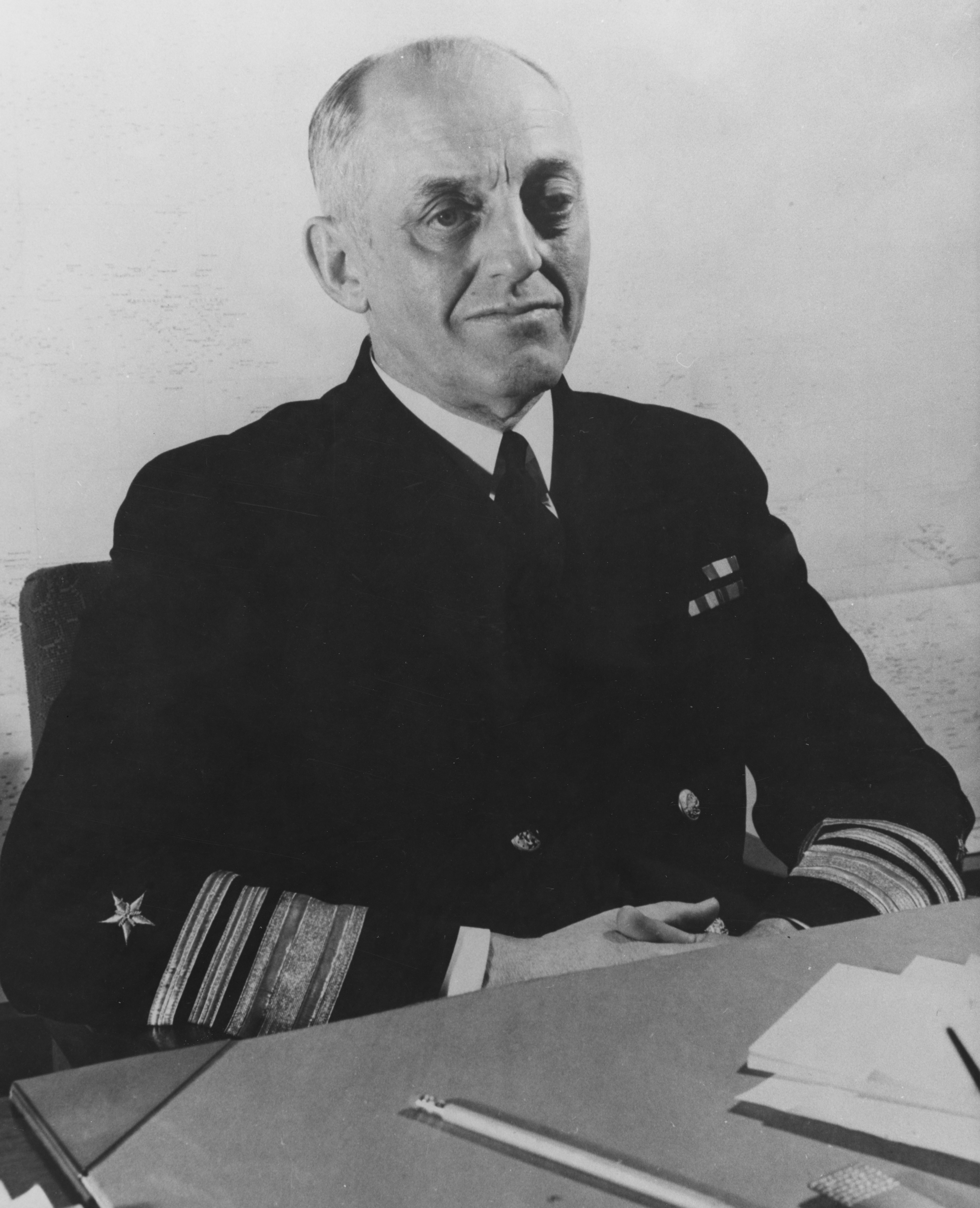
- Ghormley in 1942
- Born: October 15, 1883; Portland, Oregon, US
- Died: June 21, 1958 (aged 74); Naval Hospital, Bethesda, Maryland, US
- Burial place: Arlington National Cemetery
- Military career
- Allegiance: United States of America
- Branch: United States Navy
- Service years: 1906–1946
- Rank: Vice Admiral
- Commands: 14th Naval District; South Pacific Area; Assistant Chief of Naval Operations; USS Nevada (BB-36); USS Sands (DD-243); USS Niagara (SP-136)
- Conflicts: Philippine–American War; Occupation of Nicaragua; World War I Turkish War of Independence: Bombardment of Samsun World War II; Guadalcanal campaign
- Awards: Navy Distinguished Service Medal; Army Distinguished Service Medal; Legion of Merit

Vice Admiral Robert Lee Ghormley (October 15, 1883 – June 21, 1958) was an admiral in the United States Navy who served as commander, South Pacific Area during World War II. Ghormley was long considered to be an ineffective leader—overly cautious, pessimistic, and even defeatist—but recent scholarship has argued that while he may not have been an inspiring leader, he performed well enough under difficult circumstances.

== Early years ==
Born in Portland, Oregon, Ghormley was the oldest of six children to a Presbyterian missionary. While attending the University of Idaho in Moscow, he was appointed to the U.S. Naval Academy at Annapolis, Maryland, and entered there on September 23, 1902, and graduated in June 1906.

Among his classmates were many future admirals including Arthur L. Bristol, William L. Calhoun, William A. Glassford, Charles C. Hartigan, Aubrey W. Fitch, Frank J. Fletcher, Isaac C. Kidd, John S. McCain Sr., Leigh Noyes, Ferdinand L. Reichmuth, John H. Towers, Russell Willson, Thomas Withers, Roland M. Brainard, Milo F. Draemel, and Sherwoode A. Taffinder.

He served on cruisers during the next five years, including USS West Virginia, the auxiliary cruiser USS Buffalo, USS Charleston, and USS Maryland. From 1911 to 1913, Lieutenant Ghormley was aide and flag lieutenant to the commander in chief, Pacific Fleet, participating in the 1912 campaign in Nicaragua. That was followed by duty at the U.S. Naval Academy starting in June 1913. He was assigned to the battleship USS Nevada in June 1916.

Ghormley was promoted to lieutenant commander on May 23, 1917, and spent most of World War I on Nevada and as a flag aide. Late in the conflict, he was promoted to commander and became assistant director of the Overseas Division of the Naval Overseas Transportation Service. In 1919 he was awarded the Army Distinguished Service Medal for his service in this position.

From 1920 to 1922, he commanded the patrol vessel USS Niagara and the destroyer USS Sands, including Mediterranean Sea duty in the latter.

== Mid-career ==
Promoted to the rank of commander in July 1921, Ghormley served as aide to the Assistant Secretary of the Navy from 1923 to 1925 and as executive officer of the battleship Oklahoma for the next two years. In 1927 he became secretary of the Navy's General Board, in Washington, D.C., Captain Ghormley was chief of staff to the commanders of the Battle Force and U.S. Fleet during the early 1930s.

After working with the Chief of Naval Operations, he became commanding officer of the battleship Nevada from June 25, 1935, to June 23, 1936. In 1936, he returned to the U.S. Fleet staff. By 1938, he completed the senior course at the Naval War College. Rear Admiral Ghormley became director of the War Plans Division and Assistant Chief of Naval Operations, remaining in those positions until August 1940. He then was sent to the United Kingdom as a special naval observer for President Franklin D. Roosevelt. He was subsequently promoted to vice admiral on September 18, 1941, having been promoted to rear admiral on October 1, 1938.

== World War II ==
=== Pearl Harbor attack and selection for South Pacific command ===
The attack on Pearl Harbor on December 7, 1941, by the Japanese Imperial Navy using fast offensive aircraft carrier forces wrought destruction on the American battleships there at anchor. This dramatically changed the strategic and tactical (doctrinal) emphasis of the U.S. Navy for the rest of World War II. Until the attack on Pearl Harbor, the battleship was widely accepted and held as the supreme weapon of naval power. The attack from aircraft launched by carriers made it clear that air power had instantly superseded the battleship as the primary asset of naval power. In the days after the Pearl Harbor attack, the U.S. Navy attempted to immediately reinforce Wake Island, and dispatched Vice Admiral William Halsey Jr. on raids against various enemy-held islands.

In March and April 1942, as the Japanese were surging through Southeast Asia, the U.S. Joint Chiefs of Staff developed plans for U.S. operations over the rest of the year and the governments of the Allied nations negotiated a division of Pacific Ocean operating areas and commands. Among the areas and commands established was the South Pacific Area, a subdivision of the Pacific Ocean Area. In April, Vice Admiral Ghormley was recalled from London and informed by Commander-in-Chief, United States Fleet, and Chief of Naval Operations Admiral Ernest J. King that he would command the South Pacific Force and Area.

Ghormley was chosen for the command on the recommendations of Admiral Chester Nimitz, Commander-in-Chief, United States Pacific Fleet, and Admiral King. It is possible that he was appointed to the position over other commanders with superior carrier and aviation expertise and experience because of his association with President Roosevelt. Nimitz's first choice was Admiral William S. Pye, but since Pye had recalled the Wake Island relief attempt, Admiral King was hostile to Pye. Vice Admiral Ghormley had last held sea command in 1938 on the battleship Nevada and had not been back to a sea command since. And, in addition, he had never commanded a carrier.

On May 3, the Japanese occupied the island of Tulagi and its seaplane base, in the Solomon Islands. On May 4–8, the Battle of the Coral Sea was fought and ended in a tactical victory for the Japanese but a strategic victory for the Allies. In early May, Vice Admiral Ghormley conferred with Admiral Nimitz at Pearl Harbor and then, on May 17, moved to Naval Base Noumea at Nouméa, New Caledonia, to assume his new command.

=== South Pacific command and Guadalcanal ===
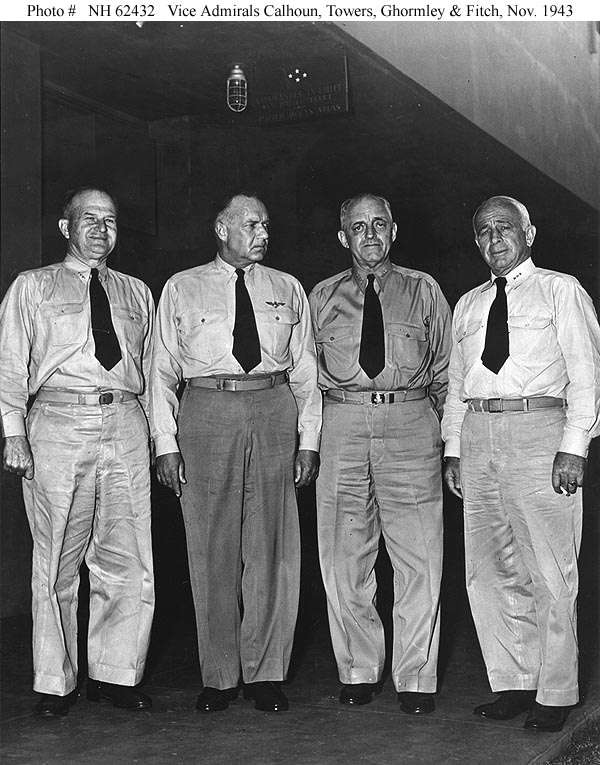
Naval Academy Classmates, now admirals, in Pacific in November 1943: Calhoun, Towers, Ghormley and Fitch.

In early July, a U.S. reconnaissance flight observed that the Japanese were building an airfield on Guadalcanal, across Ironbottom Sound from Tulagi. Thus, on July 10, Admiral Nimitz ordered the undertaking of Operation Watchtower, to immediately attack, seize, and hold the Solomon Islands of Guadalcanal and Tulagi. As COMSOPAC, Ghormley would command the operation, with the landing on Guadalcanal to take place on August 7.

Forces assigned to Ghormley for Watchtower included the 1st Marine Division (11,000 men) commanded by Marine Major General Alexander Vandegrift and three carrier groups under Vice Admiral Fletcher: Saratoga, Wasp, and Enterprise. They were joined by the South Pacific Amphibious Force of escorts and transports commanded by Rear Admiral Richmond Kelly Turner. They were supported by Land-Based Air, South Pacific Force, under Rear Admiral McCain, and Allied Air Forces, Southwest Pacific, under General Douglas MacArthur and Lt. General George Kenney.

Ghormley's performance in command was lackluster and pessimistic, as reflected in his continuing reports to Admiral Nimitz at Pearl Harbor, of which Admiral King took exceptional note. Ghormley had been directed through original operational orders by Admiral King to "personally oversee" the Guadalcanal/Tulagi attacks by U.S. forces, meaning he was expected to be on site or in the immediate area of conflict. However, Ghormley was either absent in the early planning phases and subsequent invasions or else holed up in his headquarters once he finally moved to Nouméa, more than 900 miles (1,400 km) from Guadalcanal. He was overwhelmed by the quick developments of the overall operation as well as lack of immediate resources, paperwork, myriad details and petty political squabbling caused by New Caledonia's French government hosts, rather than being present in the immediate conflict areas. It was noted that Ghormley failed to set foot on Guadalcanal or to make himself 'visible' to combat forces as a leadership presence.

Ghormley also conveyed weak or indecisive communications to his commanders and was absent at critical planning meetings, which were marked by vociferous arguments between Admirals Fletcher and Turner over the length of time that carriers would be able to provide air cover to landing forces and supply ships. Fletcher seemed to place more concern on protecting the aircraft carriers and on the overall fuel needs of the fleet over the immediate support requirements of the invasion force. Part of the problem was also due to Fletcher's attempts to interpret Admiral Nimitz's dictum against over-exposure of carriers to attack unless more damage could be inflicted upon the enemy; Admiral Fletcher was left to interpret this rather than Vice Admiral Ghormley, and Fletcher's interpretation was seen as over-cautious. The heated arguments aside, Ghormley had assigned Fletcher as the commander, Expeditionary Force who had overriding authority to move carrier air support out of the battle area. After only 36 hours, and with at least two to three days (estimate as high as five by Turner) needed to unload supplies to the Marines fighting on Guadalcanal, Fletcher ordered carriers to pull out of the immediate critical invasion operation, leaving many supply ships remaining to be unloaded and vulnerable to Japanese attack, and without carrier air support for ground forces.

As a result of all these errors and misjudgments, both Admirals Nimitz and King became highly concerned with the precarious state of the conflict and Ghormley's ability to command in a sound manner. In consequence, Vice Admiral William F. Halsey flew to Nouméa on October 16, 1942, to interview Ghormley and his staff. It became apparent to Admiral Nimitz that Ghormley and his staff did not have answers to serious questions that they should have had.

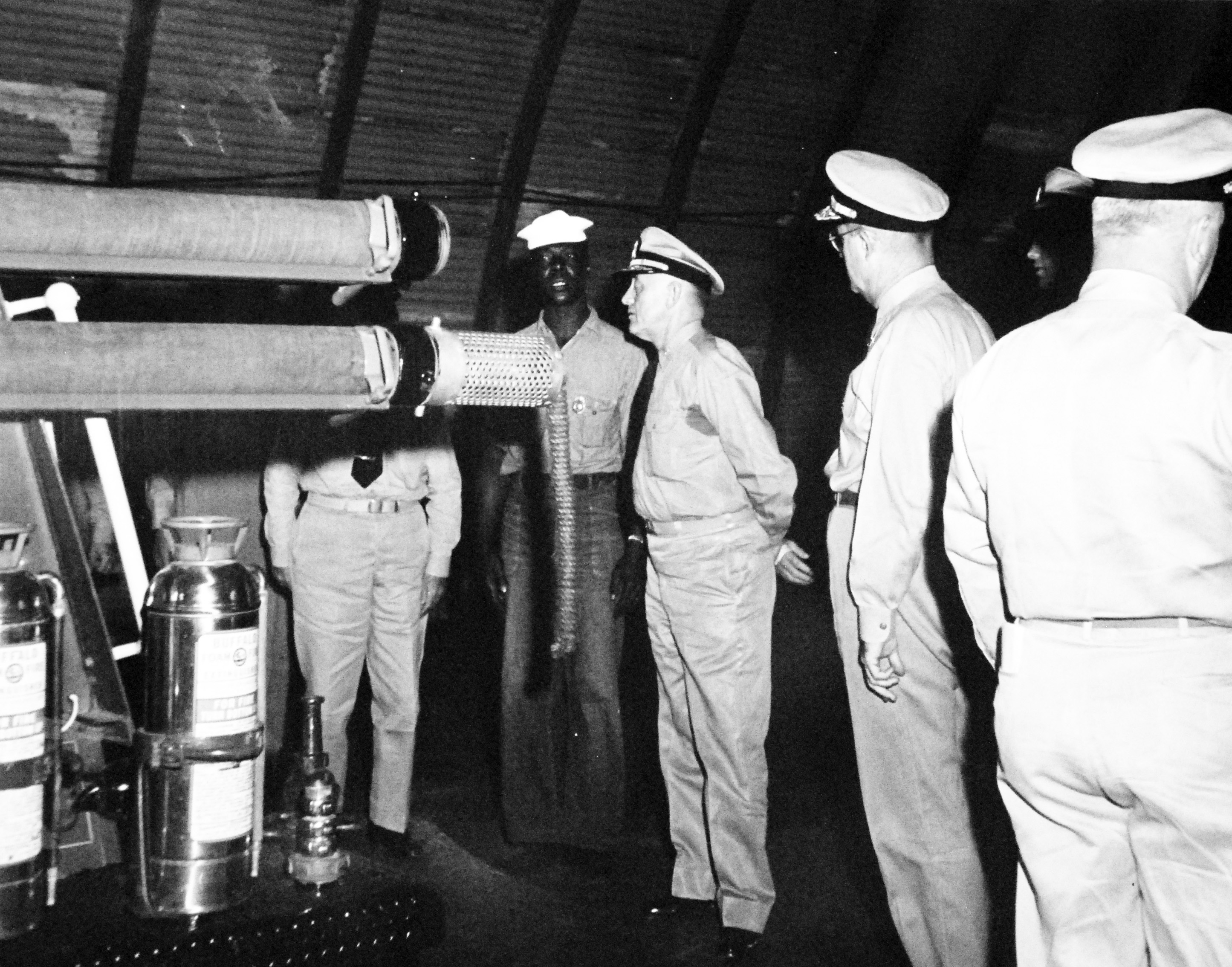
Ghormley during an inspection of the fire equipment at Manana Naval Barracks, Hawaii, August 1944.

Dismayed by Ghormley's shortcomings, on October 18 Admiral Nimitz replaced him with Vice Admiral Halsey, who quickly and decisively took leadership command and fully restored the balance of trust. Placing Halsey in charge demonstrated that the job had required a decisive, aggressive, competent and battle-trained carrier admiral. As Ghormley should have done from the beginning, Halsey had no problem with making frequent numerous appearances and taking the lead. Some time later, according to Elmer B. Potter, the biographer of Nimitz, Ghormley "was found to be suffering from abscessed teeth, possibly the main cause of his shortcomings as ComSoPac."

=== Later service ===
Following his dismissal from South Pacific Force, Ghormley served in Washington, D.C., attached to the headquarters, United States Fleet under Admiral Ernest J. King, before he was ordered to Hawaii as commandant of the 14th Naval District in February 1943. While in this capacity, he was responsible for the defense of the Hawaiian Islands, and islands to westward, including Midway, and Johnston. Ghormley served in this capacity until October 1944, when he was relieved by Rear Admiral William R. Furlong and ordered to European Theater of Operations for new assignment. He was decorated with Legion of Merit for his service on Hawaii.

In December 1944, Ghormley became commander, United States Naval Forces Germany with additional duty as senior naval member of the Group Control Council for Germany, and served in that position for the rest of the War and was responsible for the directing of effective organization in carrying out the demilitarization of the German Navy and the collection of valuable intelligence material. He was decorated with Navy Distinguished Service Medal and returned to the United States in December 1945. He spent his last months of active duty as a member of the General Board, at the Navy Department, and retired on August 1, 1946, completing 40 years on active duty.

== Retirement and death ==
While recovering from surgery in 1958 at Bethesda Naval Hospital, Ghormley died at age 74 on June 21, and was buried with full military honors at Arlington National Cemetery, Virginia. His wife, Lucile Lyon Ghormley (1890–1966) is buried beside him. They had two children, a daughter Alicia Ghormley Robards (1914–2001) and a son Robert Lee Ghormley Jr. (1923–2012), who also served in the Navy and retired as commander.

== Legacy ==
A small city park in Moscow, Idaho, near the University of Idaho, is named for Admiral Ghormley. (46.732°N 117.01°W)

== Awards ==
- Navy Distinguished Service Medal
- Army Distinguished Service Medal
- Legion of Merit
- Navy Expeditionary Medal
- Nicaraguan Campaign Medal
- World War I Victory Medal
- American Defense Service Medal
- Asiatic-Pacific Campaign Medal with one battle star
- European-African-Middle Eastern Campaign Medal
- World War II Victory Medal
- Navy Occupation Medal
