= David B. Kitts =

American geologist (1923–2010)

David Burlingame Kitts (1923–2010) was an American geologist.

Kitts was born in Oswego, New York, the son of Willard A. Kitts and Fredrika B. Jones. He majored in zoology, receiving a B.S. degree in 1949. He studied population genetics under Theodosius Dobzhansky. He later studied paleontology under George Gaylord Simpson. In 1953 he obtained his PhD in geology. He joined the University of Oklahoma's School of Geology in 1954 where he worked until 1988. He is most well known for his work on Cenozoic animals and the philosophy of geology.

== Publications ==
- The Structure of Geology (1977)
