= S. A. Schindler =

American politician

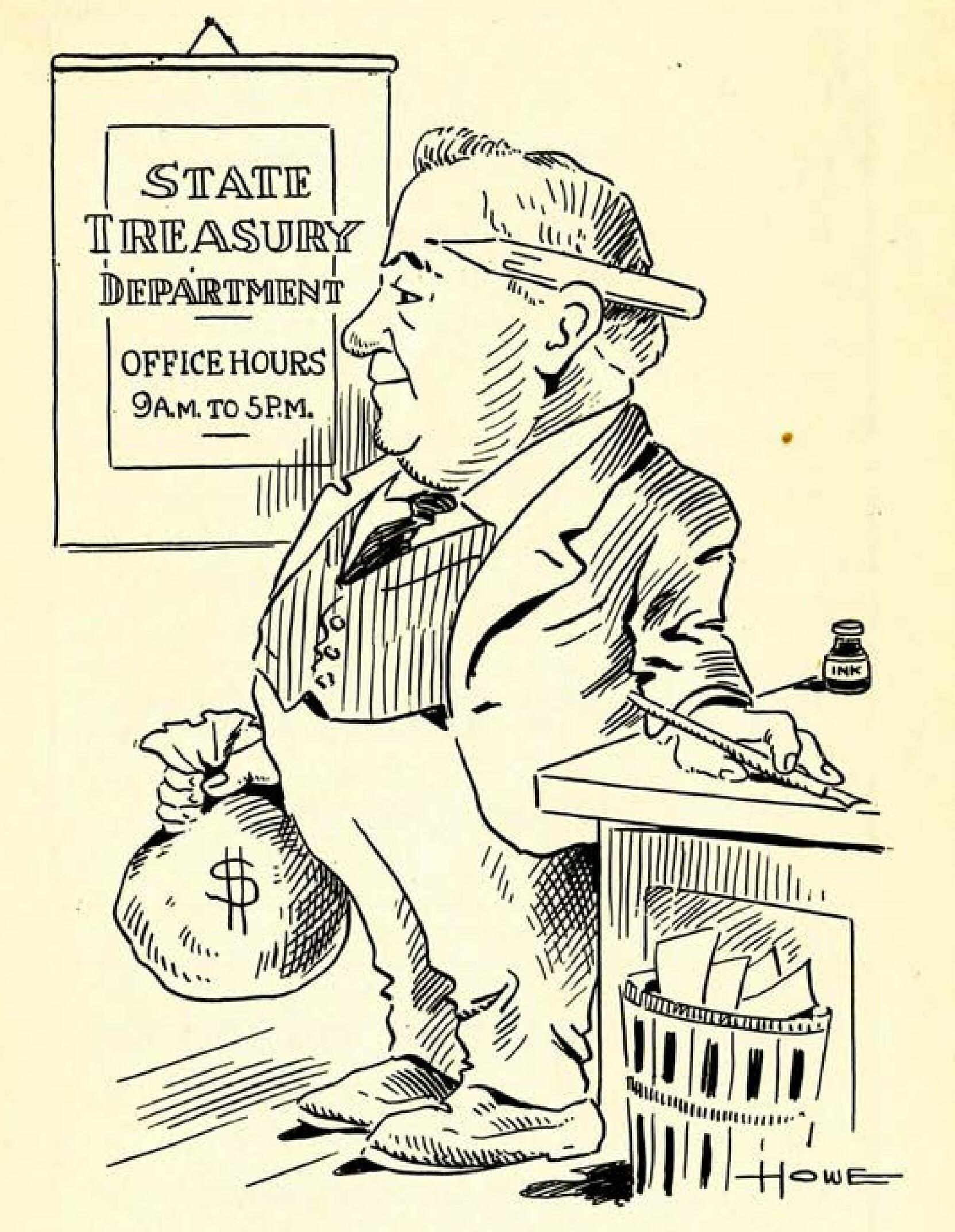
1920s cartoon of Schindler

Sebastian Albert Schindler (April 28, 1871 – June 17, 1931) was a member of the Wisconsin State Assembly.

== Biography ==
Schindler was born on April 28, 1871. Among his children was Walter Schindler, who became a vice admiral in the United States Navy. He died of a heart attack on June 17, 1931.

== Career ==
Schindler was a member of the Assembly during the 1913, 1915 and 1917 sessions. At the time of his death, he was Deputy State Treasurer. In addition, Schindler was President (similar to Mayor) of New Glarus, Wisconsin, a member of the County Board of Green County, Wisconsin and a school board president. He was a Republican.
