= USS Charles P. Cecil =

Gearing-class destroyer

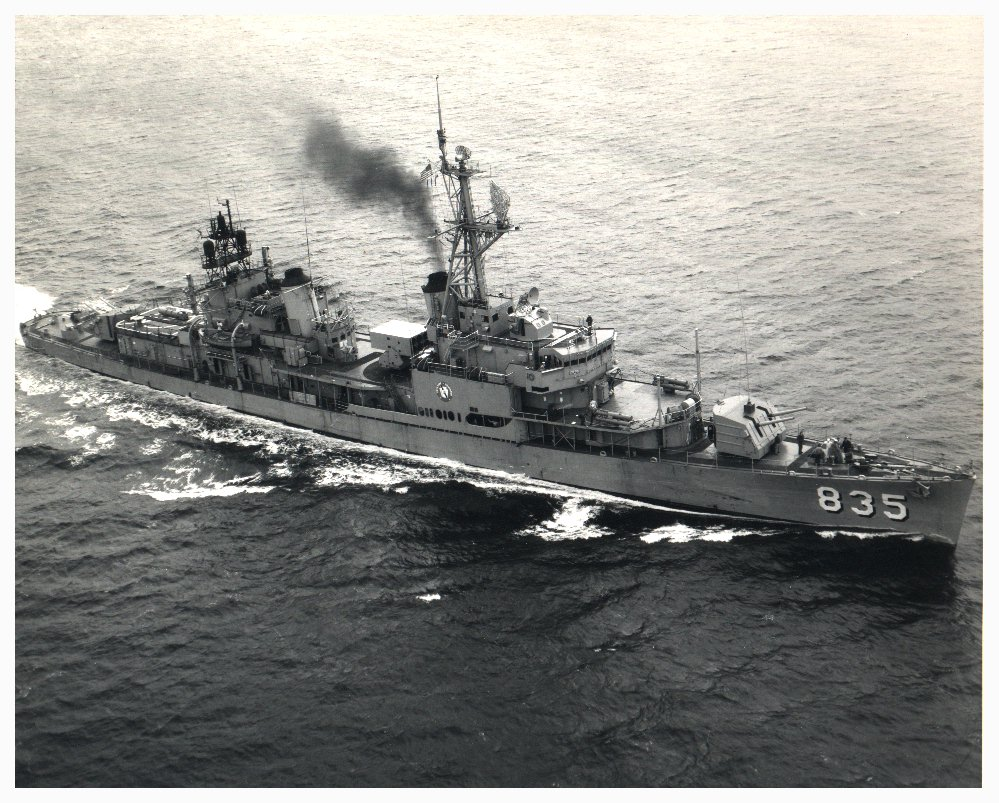
- USS Charles P. Cecil, 1971

History

United States
- Name: USS Charles P. Cecil (DD-835)
- Namesake: Charles P. Cecil
- Builder: Bath Iron Works, Bath, Maine
- Laid down: 2 December 1944
- Launched: 2 April 1945
- Commissioned: 29 June 1945
- Reclassified: DDR-835, 18 March 1949
- Decommissioned: 1 October 1979
- Identification: Callsign: NBBG; Hull number: DD-835
- Fate: Sold to Greece, 8 August 1980

History

Greece
- Name: Apostolis (D216)
- Acquired: 8 August 1980
- Commissioned: 1980
- Stricken: 1993
- Fate: Sold for scrap, March 2003

General characteristics
- Class & type: Gearing-class destroyer
- Displacement: 3,460 long tons (3,516 t) full
- Length: 390 ft 6 in (119.02 m)
- Beam: 40 ft 10 in (12.45 m)
- Draft: 14 ft 4 in (4.37 m)
- Propulsion: Geared turbines, 2 shafts, 60,000 shp (45 MW)
- Speed: 35 knots (65 km/h; 40 mph)
- Range: 4,500 nmi (8,300 km) at 20 kn (37 km/h; 23 mph)
- Complement: 336
- Armament: 2 × 5-inch/38-caliber guns; 1 x MK 16 ASROC missile launcher; 2 × 21 inch (533 mm) triple torpedo tubes; 6 × depth charge projectors; 2 × depth charge tracks

USS Charles P. Cecil (DD/DDR-835) was a Gearing-class destroyer, the only ship of the United States Navy to be named after Rear Admiral Charles P. Cecil. She was launched on 22 April 1945 by Bath Iron Works, Bath, Maine; sponsored by Mrs. C. P. Cecil; and commissioned on 29 June 1945.

== Service history ==
Charles P. Cecil arrived at San Diego, her home port, on 20 November 1945, and almost at once sailed on a tour of Pacific duty which found her operating as part of Joint Task Force One in the atomic bomb tests at Bikini Atoll, as well as supporting occupation forces with operations in Japanese waters. She returned to San Diego on 9 August 1946, and took part in exercises off the west coast until on 26 August 1947, when she cleared for her second deployment to the Far East. She touched at many Pacific islands as well as calling at ports in China, Japan and Okinawa before her return to San Diego on 5 May 1948.

Reclassified DDR-835 on 18 March 1949, Charles P. Cecil left San Diego astern on 4 April 1949, bound for Newport, Rhode Island, and assignment to the Atlantic Fleet. First from Newport, and from December 1950, from Norfolk, Virginia, Charles P. Cecil operated through 1960 with the Atlantic Fleet, taking part in midshipmen training cruises, periodic deployments to the Mediterranean, and the overhauls and refresher training necessary to maintain her readiness. She participated in a long list of NATO operations, in waters ranging from those north of the Arctic Circle to the Mediterranean. Her tours of duty with the 6th Fleet in the Mediterranean included one which coincided with the Suez Crisis of fall 1956, during which she took up watchful patrol in the eastern Mediterranean.

From January 1959, when she was fitted with highly complex electronic computational and tracking equipment, Charles P. Cecil concentrated on air defense experiments and exercises, contributing to the development of advanced techniques. Her training, however, continued to include the areas such as anti-submarine warfare and amphibious operations required of the versatile destroyer.

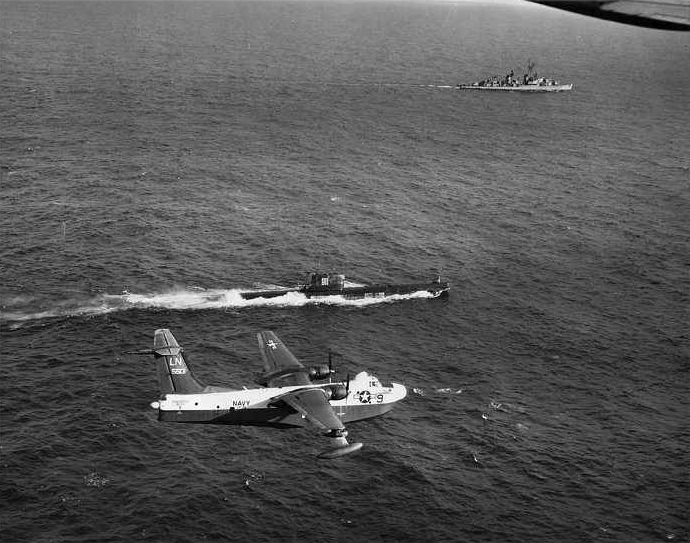
Charles P. Cecil and a P5M with a Soviet Foxtrot class submarine during the Cuban Missile Crisis, 1962.

Charles P. Cecil participated in thirteen Mediterranean cruises, two Middle East cruises, and two Vietnam cruises; She was one of the first ships on the Cuban Quarantine Line in the fall of 1962, where she was the principal unit that challenged the B-36, a Foxtrot class Russian submarine and forced her to surface.

In 1963, Charles P. Cecil entered the New York Naval Shipyard for her FRAM I modernization. Her armament was optimised for anti-submarine warfare and she was redesignated DD-835 on 30 July 1963. Her yard period lasted until May 1964.

In July 1973 Charles P. Cecil was assigned to naval reserve squadron COMDESRON TWO EIGHT and homeported in New London, Connecticut.

== Greek service ==
Charles P. Cecil was struck from the United States Navy's rolls of fighting ships on 1 October 1979 and subsequently sold to Greece and renamed Apostolis (D216) on 8 August 1980. Named to honor the Naval Commander Nikolis Apostolis, who fought in the Greek War of Independence, she served with the Hellenic Navy until she was decommissioned in 1993. She was scrapped in March 2003.
