= United States Naval Forces Germany =

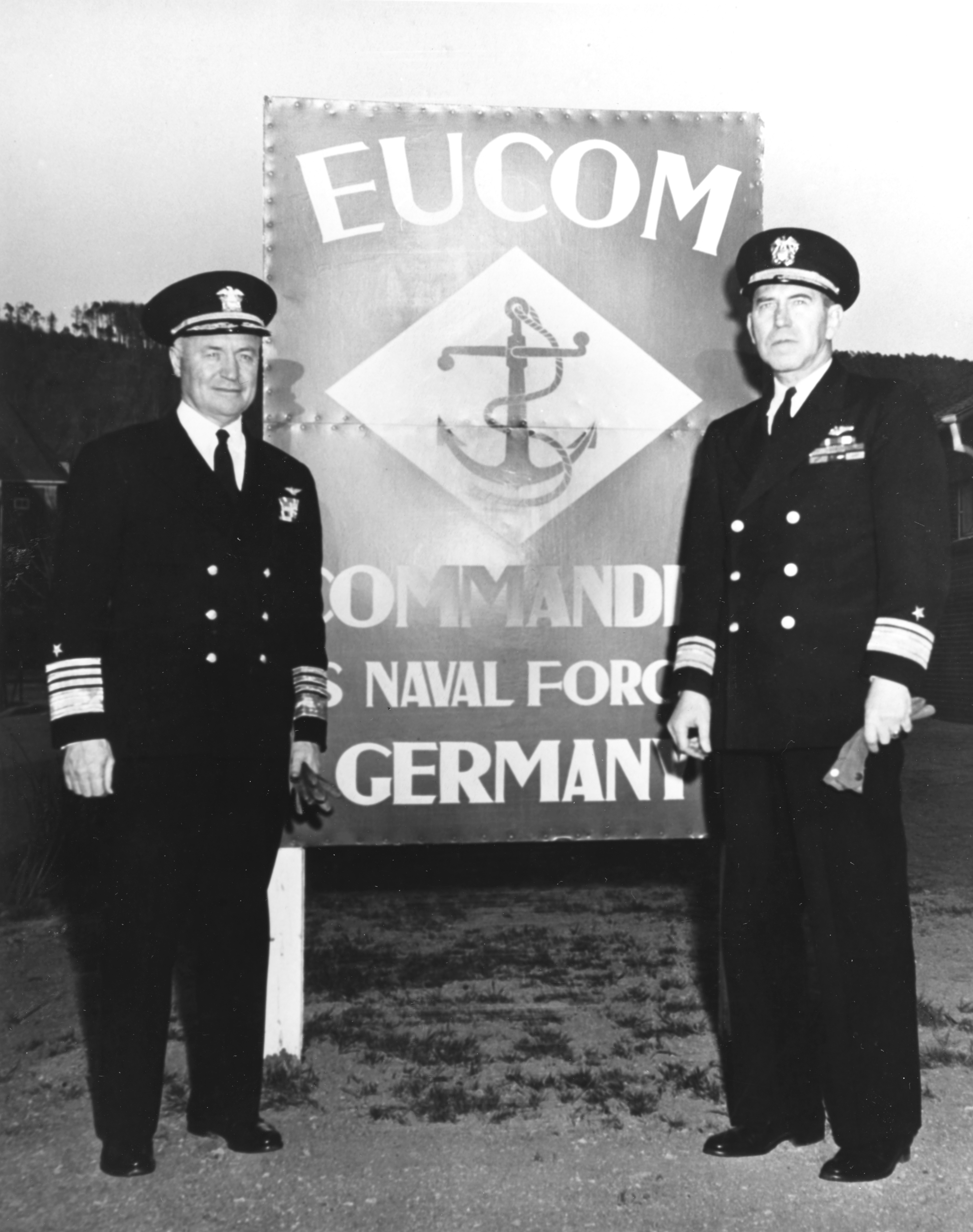
The Chief of Naval Operations, Admiral Forrest P. Sherman, and Rear Admiral John E. Wilkes, Commander, US Naval Forces Germany, at the headquarters at Heidelberg 1950

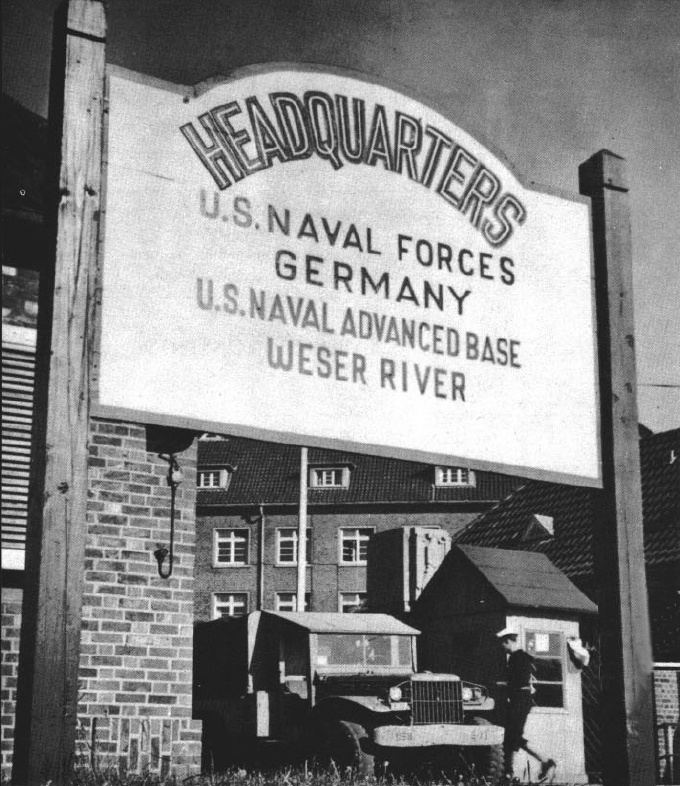
Headquarters sign, 1948

United States Naval Forces Germany (NAVFORGER) was a command of the United States Navy, active from 1944 to 1958. It also had the designation Task Force 104 (TF-104). NAVFORGER was responsible for all US naval activities in Germany.

Its first commander was Vice Admiral Robert L. Ghormley (1944–45).

After the formation of the command, it was first necessary to take under U.S. control the German warships assigned to the U.S. as war prizes (for example, the heavy cruiser Prinz Eugen). To this end, in Bremerhaven, a Naval Service Unit (MDG) was established.

After the initial, purely administrative order, the settlement of the German Kriegsmarine and the merchant navy was in cooperation with the other allies, finished, the command was greatly reduced. It was intended to completely dissolve the command in 1948. However, the American military governor General Lucius D. Clay and since July 1948 COMNAVFORGER Rear Admiral Wilkes convinced the leadership in Washington to leave some naval forces in Germany.

The now allotted backup and reconnaissance tasks were to deal with three main elements: the Naval Advanced Base Bremerhaven, the Rhine River Patrol and the Intelligence Unit stationed in Berlin. The tasks also included the supervision and management of commercial shipping on the inland waters of the United States Zone.

== Commanders ==
- Vice admiral Robert L. Ghormley (December 1944 – August 1945)
- Vice admiral William A. Glassford (August 1945 - February 1946)
- Rear admiral Roscoe E. Schuirmann (June, 1946 - August 1948)
- Rear admiral John E. Wilkes (August 1948 – April 1951)
- Rear admiral Carl F. Holden (April 1951 – June 1952)
- Rear admiral Howard E. Orem (June 1952 - March 1954)
- Rear admiral Bertram J. Rodgers (March 1954 – October 12, 1955)
- Rear admiral Walter G. Schindler (October 12, 1955 - July 31, 1957)
