= USS Firedrake =

Ammunition ship of the United States Navy

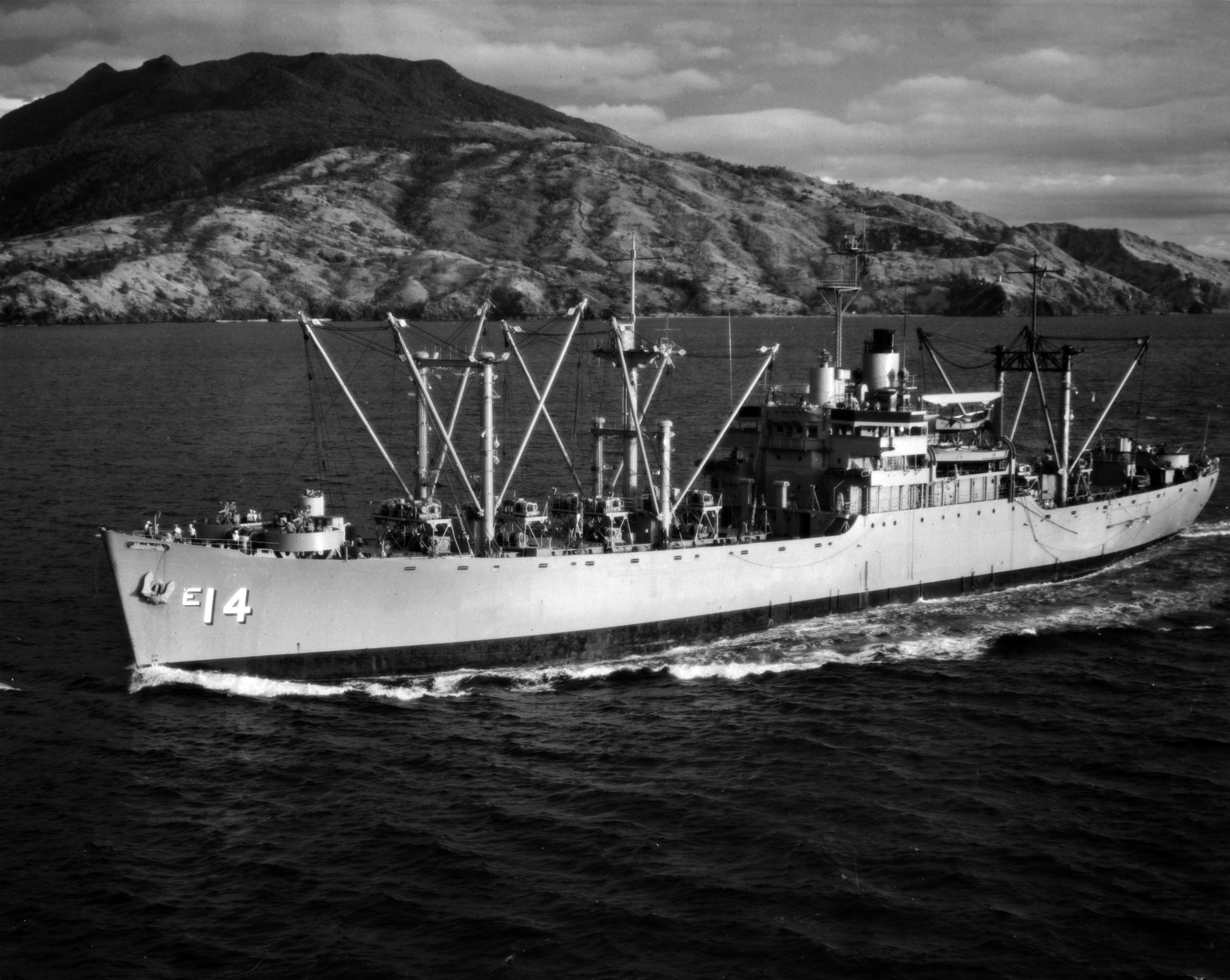
- USS Firedrake (AE-14) in 1963

History

United States
- Launched: 12 May 1944
- Commissioned: 27 December 1944; 11 October 1951
- Decommissioned: 21 February 1946; 19 March 1971
- Motto: "in omnia paratus"
- Fate: Scrapped 1978
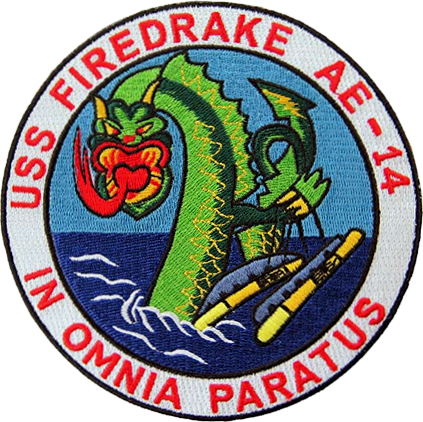
- Badge

General characteristics
- Length: 459 ft 2 in (140 m)
- Beam: 63 ft (19.2 m)
- Draught: 28 ft 3 in (8.6 m)
- Propulsion: Geared turbine; 1 × shaft; 6,000 shp (4.5 MW)
- Speed: 16 knots (30 km/h)
- Capacity: 7,700 long tons (7,800 t) deadweight
- Complement: 267 officers and enlisted

USS Firedrake (AE-14) was a Mount Hood-class ammunition ship in service with the United States Navy from 1944 to 1946 and from 1951 to 1971. She was scrapped in 1978.

== History ==
Firedrake was laid down on 13 March 1944 by North Carolina Shipbuilding Company, Wilmington, North Carolina as Winged Racer; launched 12 May 1944, sponsored by Mrs. R.M. Kitchins; acquired by the Navy 29 June 1944; converted to an ammunition ship at Gibbs Gas Engine Co., Jacksonville, Florida; and commissioned at Jacksonville on 27 December 1944.

=== World War II ===
After shakedown and yard availability at Naval Base Norfolk in January 1945, Firedrake loaded ammunition and general cargo at Naval Weapons Station Earle, New Jersey (USA) from which she sailed 16 February 1945 for the Caroline Islands. After transiting the Panama Canal on 22 February, and calling at Eniwetok 16–17 March, the ammunition ship arrived at Ulithi on 21 March. Assigned to Service Squadron Ten, Firedrake put to sea 7 April to join the replenishment group (Task Group 50.8) servicing aircraft carriers off Okinawa and, after 18 April, TG 51.1 supplying ammunition to warships lying in the anchorages of Kerama Retto. After reloading ordnance at Ulithi from 16 May to 4 June, she arrived in Leyte Gulf ten days later to issue ordnance to warships operating north out of the Philippines.

This replenishment task continued after the Japanese surrender announcement of 15 August, as United States Fifth Fleet units used Leyte Gulf as a staging area to escort U.S. Army and U.S. Marine Corps divisions to Japan and China for occupation duty. Following the consolidation of American control of Japan in October, Firedrake was released from duty and sailed for the United States East Coast on 1 November, arriving at Yorktown, Virginia on 13 December via Eniwetok, Pearl Harbor and the Panama Canal. After unloading ammunition at Leonardo, New Jersey, in early February, Firedrake steamed south to Orange, Texas, arriving 21 February 1946, and was placed out of commission in reserve on 23 July 1946.

=== Korean War ===
Following the North Korean invasion of South Korea in June 1950, and the ensuing intervention by United Nations forces, the U.S. Navy began reactivating warships and auxiliaries to support the greatly expanded duties of the Department of Defense. As part of this effort, Firedrake recommissioned at Orange, Texas, on 11 October 1951. After fitting out at Beaumont, Texas, and then undergoing refresher training at San Diego, California, Firedrake steamed to her new home port of San Francisco for duty with Mobile Logistics Support Group Able (TG 92.1). Her first Western Pacific (WestPac) tour (29 February - 24 August 1952) took the ammunition ship to Korean waters, where she supplied ammunition to the aircraft carriers and warships operating off Korea in the Sea of Japan and the Yellow Sea. A second WestPac tour off Korea followed six months later (4 February - 30 September 1953), with the focus again that of supplying aircraft carriers with ordnance.

=== Cold War ===
Firedrake's mission did not end after the Korean armistice of July 1953, as the warships of Task Force 77 continued operations off Korea to enforce the terms of the ceasefire and began patrols elsewhere in the western Pacific. Her third WestPac tour (15 January - 17 August 1954), for example, took the ammunition further south to Subic Bay, Philippines, as part of Logistic Support Group Baker and replenishment operations in the South China Sea. During her fourth deployment (3 January - 10 June 1955), Firedrake took part in the 6–13 February evacuation of 29,000 Chinese Nationalist troops and civilians from the Tachen Islands off the coast of China. She then operated out of Subic Bay and visited Hong Kong before returning to San Francisco on 10 June.

Firedrake continued this pattern of deployments for the next five years, making annual tours (2 November 1955 - 19 April 1956; 16 October 1956 - 24 March 1957; 25 September 1957 - 11 February 1958; 30 August - 30 December 1958; 1 May - 21 August 1959) to the western Pacific. The ammunition ship delivered ammunition to forward bases, such as Buckner Bay and Beppu, and replenished warships at sea, especially aircraft carriers. After an overhaul at the Mare Island Naval Shipyard between 19 October 1959 and 15 January 1960, Firedrake conducted three more tours (April - August 1960; November 1960 - April 1961; October 1961 - April 1962) before undergoing her next overhaul in Richmond, California. During these cruises the ammunition ship normally steamed between ports in Japan and the Philippines, with periodic visits to Buckner Bay and Hong Kong. A sense of the scale and intensity of replenishment operations is indicated by her servicing of 42 ships during the 1961-62 cruise.

After shifting her home port to Naval Ammunition Depot Concord, California (USA), on 15 January 1963, Firedrake resumed her familiar schedule with another western Pacific deployment (24 January - 27 July 1963), though this time she made occasional replenishment runs to warships conducting contingency operations off Vietnam in the South China Sea. The ammunition ship also received accolades for a dramatic night evolution when Firedrake refueled a South Vietnamese Landing Ship Medium (LSM) during a heavy storm.

=== Vietnam War ===
During her next cruise (25 February - 11 October 1964), the ammunition ship continued operations in the South China Sea, replenishing aircraft carriers USS Kitty Hawk and USS Bon Homme Richard that were launching reconnaissance flights over the Plain of Jars in Laos. American reaction to the communist Pathet Lao and North Vietnamese auxiliaries in Laos escalated after two reconnaissance aircraft were shot down in early June, but it was not until the Gulf of Tonkin incident that U.S. Navy aircraft began airstrikes against North Vietnam on 5 August. Firedrake extended her deployment for two months to support the growing task force of U.S. Navy warships in the region, not returning to Concord until early October.

Following a tender availability alongside the repair ship USS Markab at Naval Air Station Alameda, a hull cleaning at Todd Shipyards in San Francisco, and the addition of a helicopter landing pad on her stern, Firedrake sailed for the western Pacific on 25 October 1965. She operated out of Naval Station Subic Bay starting in mid-November and spent the next six weeks supplying ships with, as put by the command historian, "everything from bombs, to mail, to Christmas trees." During that line period, Firedrake assisted in search and rescue operations for Panamanian freighter Impala, which had grounded and broken up off the coast of Vietnam. Just before Christmas 1965, Firedrake's crew spotted a lone survivor lashed to a hatch cover and called in a helicopter from USS Sacramento to pluck him from the water. After a visit to Hong Kong over the holidays, the ammunition ship returned to Subic Bay and the grinding duty of supplying aircraft carriers at Dixie Station southeast of Cam Rahn Bay. In late May 1966, Firedrake was caught in Typhoon Judy while vainly searching the sea for four personnel who had bailed out of a Subic-bound aircraft on the 26th. She took rolls of up to 37 degrees in a 60-knot wind before making it safely to Subic Bay. The ammunition ship returned home to Concord on 23 June.

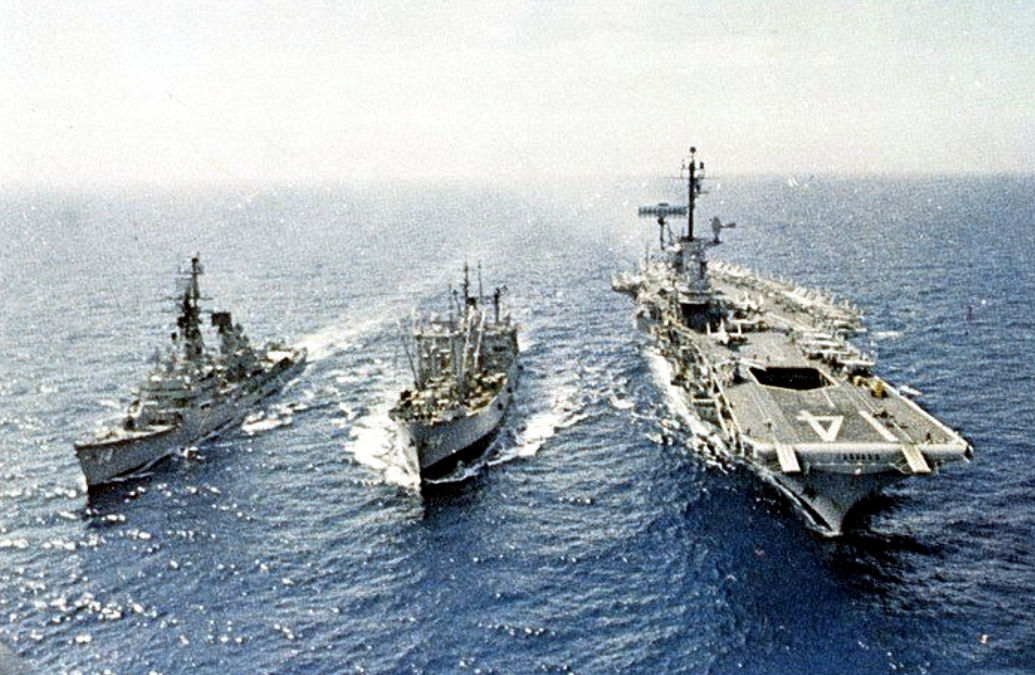
"14-14-14-14-14-14-14": on 14 May 1969 at 1400 hrs the USS Ticonderoga (CVA-14) underwent replenishment with USS Firedrake (AE-14) and USS Buchanan (DDG-14). The first line went across at 1414 hrs, and the photographer who took the photograph, PH1 R.M. Smith was in his 14th year of naval service.

Following local operations over the summer, Firedrake deployed back to Vietnamese waters earlier than expected, departing San Francisco on 12 October 1966. She arrived in the South China Sea by mid-November to an increased pace of operations, as more and more ships and aircraft were in combat operations off Vietnam. Assigned to support the warships at Yankee Station in the Tonkin Gulf, the ammunition ship began three to four week replenishment tours there and on the gunline, returning to Subic Bay roughly once a month to reload her stocks of ammunition. She returned to Concord on 22 April 1967.

Firedrake returned to the hectic pace of operations off Vietnam in late November after departing Mare Island on the 3 November 1966. The scale of replenishment operations was three times larger than half a decade previously, as the ammunition ship made 28 aircraft carrier deliveries, 37 deliveries to auxiliary ships, 21 to large warships, 95 to small warships and 4 to various other craft before returning home to Concord in April 1968. Her next deployment (February - September 1969) was much the same, when she serviced 18 auxiliaries, 15 carriers, 13 large warships, including battleship USS New Jersey, and 54 small combatants during 72 days on the line.

Following local operations out of various California ports, repairs and upkeep at San Francisco and a series of service inspections, Firedrake conducted one last deployment to the western Pacific. Deploying on 6 March 1970, the ammunition ship operated out of Subic Bay as usual before arriving home to end her long career on 10 October.

=== Decommissioning and fate ===
Firedrake shifted to in commission in reserve at the Inactive Ship Facility, Vallejo, California, on 27 November 1970, decommissioned there on 19 March 1971 and transferred to United States Maritime Administration custody in the Suisun Bay Reserve Fleet that same day. The hulk was struck from the Navy List on 15 July 1976 and later sold for scrap to General Metals of Tacoma, Inc., on 16 November 1977.

== Awards ==
- Asiatic-Pacific Campaign Medal with two battle stars
- World War II Victory Medal
- National Defense Service Medal with star
- Korean Service Medal with four campaign stars
- Vietnam Service Medal
- Korean Presidential Unit Citation
- United Nations Korea Medal
- Korean War Service Medal
- Republic of Vietnam Campaign Medal
