= Charles P. Cecil =

United States Navy admiral

Charles Purcell Cecil
- Born: 4 September 1893; Louisville, Kentucky, US
- Died: 31 July 1944 (aged 50); Vicinity of Funafuti, Pacific Ocean
- Burial place: Arlington National Cemetery
- Military career
- Allegiance: United States of America
- Branch: United States Navy
- Service years: 1916–1944
- Rank: Rear Admiral
- Commands: Destroyer Division Eleven; Destroyer Squadron Five; USS Cummings (DD-365); USS Helena (CL-50)
- Conflicts: World War I World War II
- Awards: Navy Cross; Bronze Star Medal

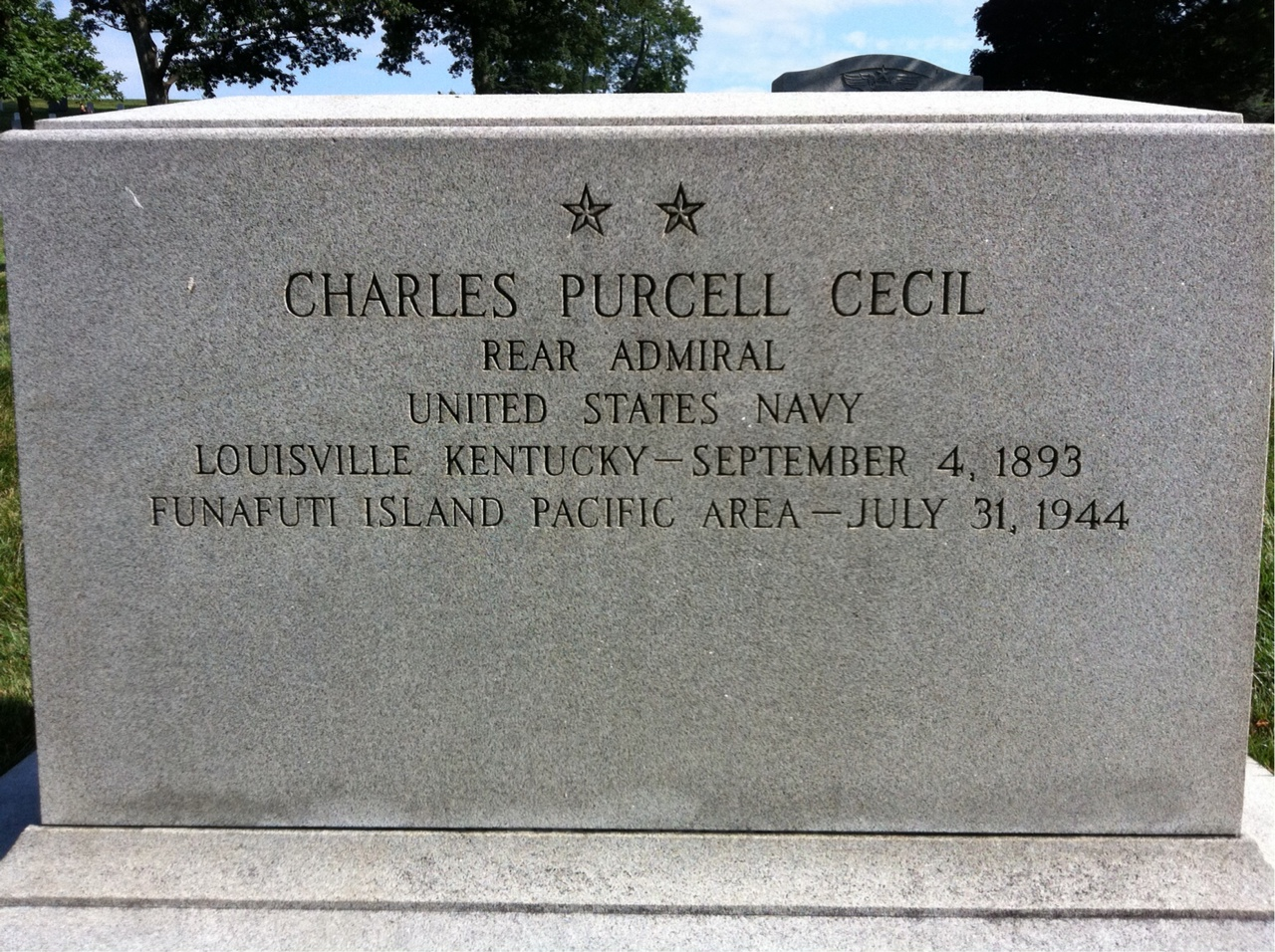
Cecil's grave at Arlington National Cemetery.

Charles Purcell Cecil (4 September 1893 – 31 July 1944) was a US Navy Admiral during World War II and two time recipient of the Navy Cross.

== Background ==
Charles Purcell Cecil was born in Louisville, Kentucky, 4 September 1893. He graduated from the Naval Academy and was commissioned ensign in 1916. He served aboard USS Yankton (1893) during World War I. He was Commanding officer of USS Greer (DD-145) and USS Cummings (DD-365) in the 1930s prior to World War II.

== World War II ==
Cecil was awarded the Navy Cross for his actions at the Battle of Santa Cruz Islands on 26 October 1942. In November 1942, Captain Cecil assumed command of the USS Helena (CL-50). On 6 July 1943 he was awarded a Bronze Star Medal and a Gold Star in lieu of a second Navy Cross for extraordinary heroism in action against Japanese forces in the Solomon Islands in the Battle of Kula Gulf.

Cecil died in a plane crash near Funafuti on 31 July 1944 while traveling between assignments in the Pacific. Eighteen others were lost in the accident including Walter S. Gifford Jr., son of the president of AT&T.

Admiral Cecil is buried at Arlington National Cemetery.

== Awards and honors ==
A graphical representation of a selection of Admiral Cecil's personal decorations:

The USS Charles P. Cecil (DD-835) was named in his honor and commissioned on 29 June 1945.
