= George F. Hussey Jr. =

American naval officer

George Frederick Hussey Jr.
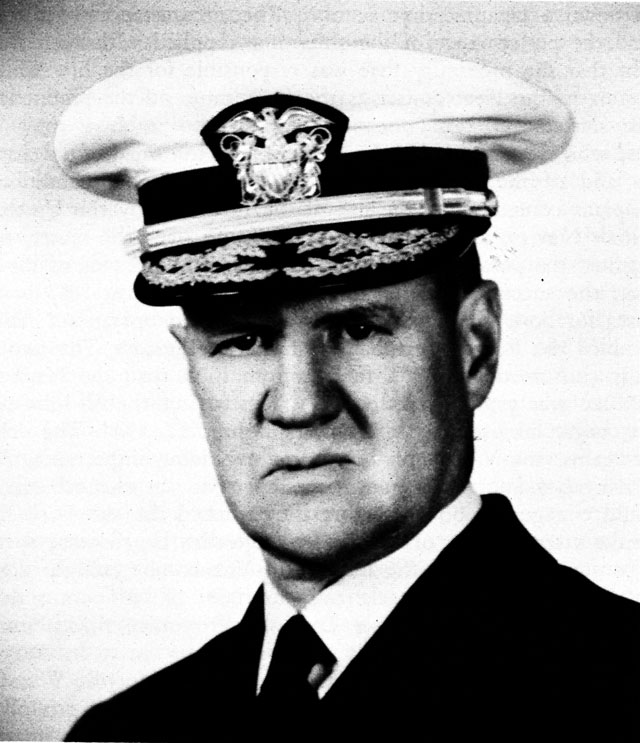
- Born: June 15, 1894; Brookline, Massachusetts, U.S.
- Died: April 17, 1983 (aged 88); Laguna Hills, California, U.S.
- Military career
- Allegiance: United States of America
- Branch: United States Navy
- Service years: 1916–1947
- Rank: Vice Admiral
- Commands: Bureau of Ordnance
- Conflicts: World War I World War II
- Awards: Distinguished Service Medal

George Frederick Hussey Jr. (June 15, 1894 – April 17, 1983) was United States Navy Vice admiral during World War II, who served as the Chief of Naval Ordnance from December 1943 to September 1947.

== Early years in the Navy ==
George Frederick Hussey Jr. was born on June 15, 1894, in Brookline, Massachusetts. He attended the United States Naval Academy at Annapolis, Maryland, and graduated in 1916 with the rank of Ensign. He was subsequently assigned to USS Pennsylvania and served in Atlantic during World War I. Hussey served with Pennsylvania until 1920 and then attended the postgraduate course at United States Naval Academy.

In the interwar period, Hussey served in the various navy assignments, including service at Washington Navy Yard, as aide to Commander of Battleship Division Three or as executive officer of destroyer USS Farquhar.

== World War II ==
During the Japanese Attack on Pearl Harbor, Hussey served with the USS Hopkins within directing the off-shore patrol off Hawaii.

Hussey was ordered to Washington, D.C., where he was appointed the director of production within the Bureau of Ordnance. In December 1943, Hussey succeeded Rear admiral William H. P. Blandy and became the Chief of the Bureau. In this capacity, he was responsible for the directing of development and production of Naval arms during World War II. Hussey was decorated with the Navy Distinguished Service Medal for his service during the War and finally retired from the Navy in September 1947.

== Decorations ==

1st Row	Navy Distinguished Service Medal		
2nd Row	World War I Victory Medal with Atlantic Fleet Clasp	American Defense Service Medal with Fleet Clasp	American Campaign Medal
3rd Row	Asiatic-Pacific Campaign Medal	World War II Victory Medal	Honorary Commander of the Order of the British Empire
