= John E. Wilkes =

American military officer (1895–1957)

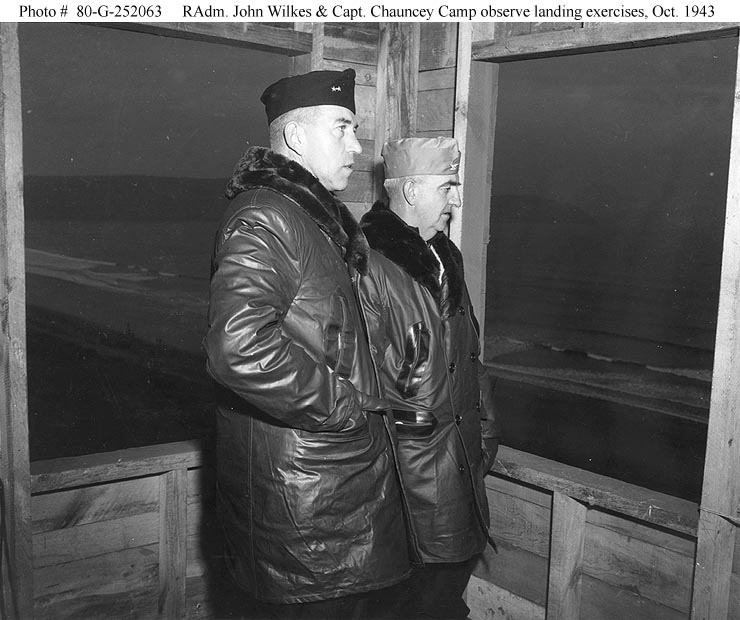
- Born: May 26, 1895; Charlotte, North Carolina, U.S.
- Died: July 20, 1957 (aged 62); Bethesda Naval Hospital, Maryland, U.S.
- Burial place: Arlington National Cemetery
- Military career
- Allegiance: United States
- Branch: United States Navy
- Service years: 1912–1951
- Rank: Vice Admiral
- Commands: USS K-7; USS S-47; USS Barracuda; Submarine Division 15; Submarine Squadron 5 Submarines, Asiatic Fleet; USS Birmingham; Submarines, Atlantic Fleet; U.S. Ports, ETO; Naval Forces, Germany; Eastern Sea Frontier
- Conflicts: World War I World War II
- Awards: Army Distinguished Service Medal; Navy Distinguished Service Medal; Legion of Merit with Combat "V" and two gold stars

John E. Wilkes (May 26, 1895 – July 20, 1957) was a vice admiral in the United States Navy, who served in World War I and World War II. In December 1941 he was appointed Commander of Submarines, Asiatic Fleet. In 1944 Wilkes was commander of all ports in Northern Europe. From 1945 to 1951 he was the chief U.S. Naval Officer in Occupied Germany. He retired in 1951.

== Biography ==
Wilkes was born in Charlotte, North Carolina. He was the oldest son of John Francis and Anna Elizabeth Beale Wilkes. His grandfather, John Wilkes graduated in the first class of the Naval Academy in Annapolis. His grandfather, Admiral Charles Wilkes is best known for American Expedition to Antarctica and the Trent Affair. Wilkes entered the United States Naval Academy in June 1912 and, upon graduation in June 1916, was commissioned in the rank of ensign. For the next three years he served in the armored cruiser Frederick, including convoy escort duty in the North Atlantic during World War I.

In 1919 Lieutenant Wilkes received submarine training and, during the next decade, served in several submarines, having command of K-7 and S-47, and had shore duty as an Inspector of Machinery at Groton, Connecticut. In 1928-30 Lieutenant Commander Wilkes was assigned to the Portsmouth Navy Yard, Kittery, Maine, then spent three years as Commanding Officer of the submarine V-1, which was renamed Barracuda in 1931.

During 1933-35 Wilkes was attached to the Reserve Officers Training Unit at the University of California at Berkeley. He was Navigator of the heavy cruiser Indianapolis from mid-1935, receiving promotion to the rank of Commander during that time. Following a tour at the Mare Island Navy Yard, California, in June 1939 Wilkes took command of Submarine Division 15, in the Asiatic Fleet, and, from December 1939, also had command of Submarine Squadron 5.

For six months after the Pacific War began in December 1941, Wilkes, who was soon promoted to Captain, commanded Asiatic Fleet submarines during their frustrating struggle against the fast-moving tide of Japanese conquest. On 29 December 1941 Wilkes and his headquarters staff were forced to evacuate from Corregidor Island in the submarine Swordfish, and headed for Surabaya, Java.

Following his return to the United States in mid-1942, Wilkes attended the Naval War College, then became Commanding Officer of the new light cruiser Birmingham, taking her to the Mediterranean Sea to participate in the invasion of Sicily in July 1943. From August 1943 Rear Admiral Wilkes had amphibious force commands in England and France, playing an important role in preparations for the invasion of Normandy in June 1944, and the invasion of Southern France two months later. As the Allied ground offensive moved into Germany, Wilkes was in charge of U.S. Ports and Bases in France, materially assisting the offensive with his management of logistics.

Rear Admiral Wilkes went to the Pacific in May 1945, as an administrator of amphibious forces as they worked towards the planned invasion of Japan.

A few months after World War II ended, he returned to the U.S. to command the Atlantic Fleet's submarine force, a position he held from late December 1945 until March 1947. He then had duty with the Joint Chiefs of Staff, in Washington, D.C., before going to Europe to take command of Naval Forces, Germany, in August 1948. His final assignment was a brief tour as Commander Eastern Sea Frontier, beginning in March 1951. On the basis of a combat award Wilkes was advanced to the rank of Vice Admiral upon retirement in June 1951. Vice Admiral John Wilkes died at the Bethesda Naval Hospital, Maryland, on 20 July 1957.
