= Cassin =

Cassin may refer to:

== People ==
=== Surname ===
- Barbara Cassin (born 1947), French writer and philosopher
- Brian Cassin (born 1967), British businessman
- Elena Cassin (1909-2011), Italian then French assyriologist
- Jack Cassin (born 1915), Australian rules footballer
- John Cassin (footballer) (born 1951), Australian rules footballer, son of Jack
- John Cassin (1813–1869), American ornithologist
- John Cassin (1760-1822), U.S. Navy Commodore
- John Cassin (footballer) (born 1951), Australian rules footballer
- René Cassin (1887–1976), French jurist
- Riccardo Cassin (1909–2009), Italian mountaineer
- Stan Cassin (born 1935), Canadian politician
- Stephen Cassin (1783–1857), officer in the U.S. Navy, son of John Cassin (naval officer)

=== Given name ===
- Cassin Young (1894–1942), officer in the U.S. Navy

== Organisations ==
- CCJO René Cassin, Jewish human rights organisation

== Places ==
- Saint-Cassin, commune in France
- Fort Cassin, Vermont

== Ships ==
- Cassin class destroyer, a class of four World War I-era destroyers of the U.S. Navy
- USS Cassin (DD-43), the lead destroyer of the Cassin class; served during World War I
- USS Cassin (DD-372), a Mahan-class destroyer of the U.S. Navy; served during World War II
- USS Cassin Young (DD-793), a Fletcher-class destroyer of the U.S. Navy; served during World War II

== Birds ==
Named after John Cassin:

- Cassin's auklet, Ptychoramphus aleuticus
- Cassin's finch, Carpodacus cassinii
- Cassin's flycatcher, Muscicapa cassini
- Cassin's hawk-eagle, Aquila africana
- Cassin's honeyguide, Prodotiscus insignis
- Cassin's kingbird, Tyrannus vociferans
- Cassin's sparrow, Aimophila cassinii
- Cassin's spinetail, Neafrapus cassini
- Cassin's vireo, Vireo cassinii

== See also ==
- Cassinoceras, an extinct genus of nautiloids
