= Tarbell =

Tarbell may refer to:

- USS Tarbell (DD-142), a US Navy destroyer
- Tarbell Cassette Interface, for storing computer data on audio cassette
- Tarbell Course in Magic, an encyclopedia of magic written by Harlan Tarbell

People with the surname Tarbell:

- Edmund C. Tarbell (1862–1938), American impressionist painter
- Frank Bigelow Tarbell (1853–1920), American historian and archeologist
- Harlan Tarbell (1890–1960), American stage magician and illustrator
- Ida Tarbell (1857–1944), American author and journalist
- Jim Tarbell (fl. 1940s–2010s), Cincinnati councilman
- Jonathan Tarbell (1820–1888), Justice of the Supreme Court of Mississippi
- Joseph Tarbell (1780–1815), American naval officer
- Kiawentiio (2006), First Nations actress and singer

== See also ==
- Tarbell Brook, a New Hampshire stream
- Tarball (disambiguation)
