= USS Cassin =

Two ships of the United States Navy have been named Cassin, in honor of Captain Stephen Cassin.

- USS Cassin (DD-43), was a destroyer commissioned in 1913.
- USS Cassin (DD-372), was a destroyer that served during World War II.

== See also ==
- USS Cassin Young (DD-793)
