= Action of 15 October 1917 =

- Part of World War I, Atlantic U-boat Campaign
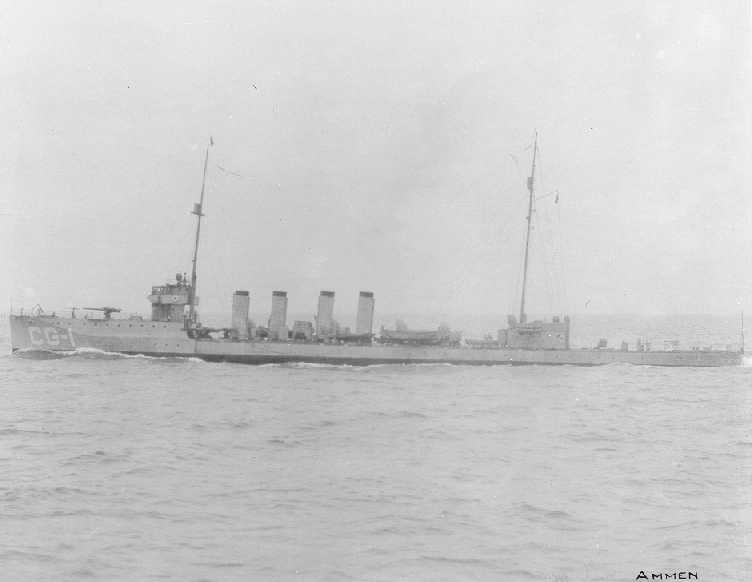
- The destroyer USS Cassin.
Date	15 October 1917
Location	off Mind Head, Ireland, Celtic Sea, Atlantic Ocean
Result	American victory

Belligerents
United States	German Empire

Commanders and leaders
(United States) W. N. Vernou	(German Empire) Victor Dieckmann

Strength
Destroyer USS Cassin	Submarine U-61

Casualties and losses
One killed Nine wounded Cassin damaged	U-61 damaged

The action of 15 October 1917 was a naval engagement of World War I between Imperial Germany and the United States off the coast of Mine Head, Ireland.

== Action ==
The American destroyer USS Cassin, commanded by Lieutenant Commander Walter N. Vernou, was operating off the coast of Ireland in October 1917. On anti-submarine patrols and rescue missions, as well as convoy duty. Operating out of Queenstown, Ireland, she was armed with four 4 in (100 mm) guns and eight 18 in (460 mm) torpedo tubes. The German submarine U-61—on a typical unrestricted U-boat mission — was cruising in British waters, attacking Allied shipping. She was armed with a deck gun and torpedoes.

On 15 October 1917, Cassin sighted U-61 at about 23 mi (20 nmi; 37 km) south of Mind Head at 13:30 and 5 mi (4.3 nmi; 8.0 km) from the ship. The German submarine sighted Cassin as well, she immediately submerged and began to flee. A pursuit ensued for an hour; at about 14:30, U-61's commander—Victor Dieckmann—decided to engage the tailing American warship.

The Germans then turned about and surfaced to line up for a shot and fired their last torpedo. Gunner's Mate First Class Osmond Ingram noticed the incoming projectile, he quickly ran over to the depth charge gunners and ordered them to jettison the charges before the torpedo struck them. The torpedo struck the destroyer aft on the port side before this could be done and Ingram was killed in the explosion.

The torpedo hit Cassin's portside stern, nearly blowing off her rudder. The American destroyer began to steam in circles, but returned a barrage of 4 inch shells which forced the U-boat to dive. Four hits damaged U-61's conning tower which discouraged her commander from continuing to attack.

Besides the American sailor killed, nine others were wounded in the action. The dead sailor—Osmond Ingram—was awarded the Medal of Honor for his service on 15 October. Eventually, another American destroyer USS Porter and the British sloops HMS Jessamine and Tamarisk arrived on the scene and protected Cassin throughout the night. However, no further U-boat contacts were made. The next morning, Cassin was towed back to Queenstown by Captain Ronald Niel Stuart in HMS Snowdrop. The damaged USS Cassin was repaired and returned to active duty in July 1918; U-61 was sunk by the P-class sloop HMS PC.51 a few months later.

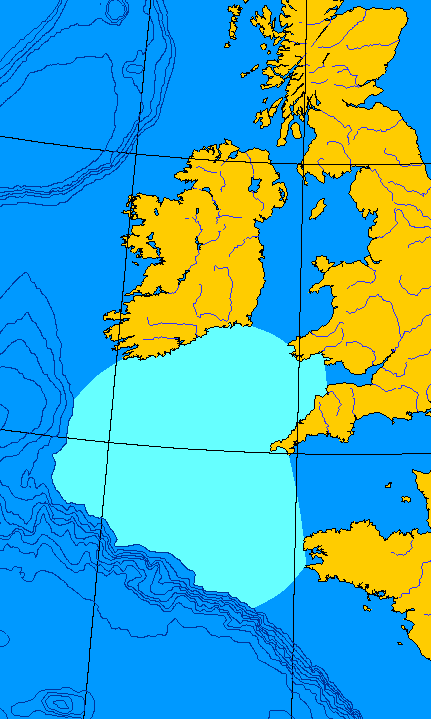
Map of the Celtic Sea, part of the Atlantic Ocean

== See also ==
- Action of 4 May 1917
- Action of 17 November 1917
- Action of 15 August 1915
- Action of 8 May 1918
