= Walter N. Vernou =

American Navy admiral (1878–1955)

Walter Newhall Vernou
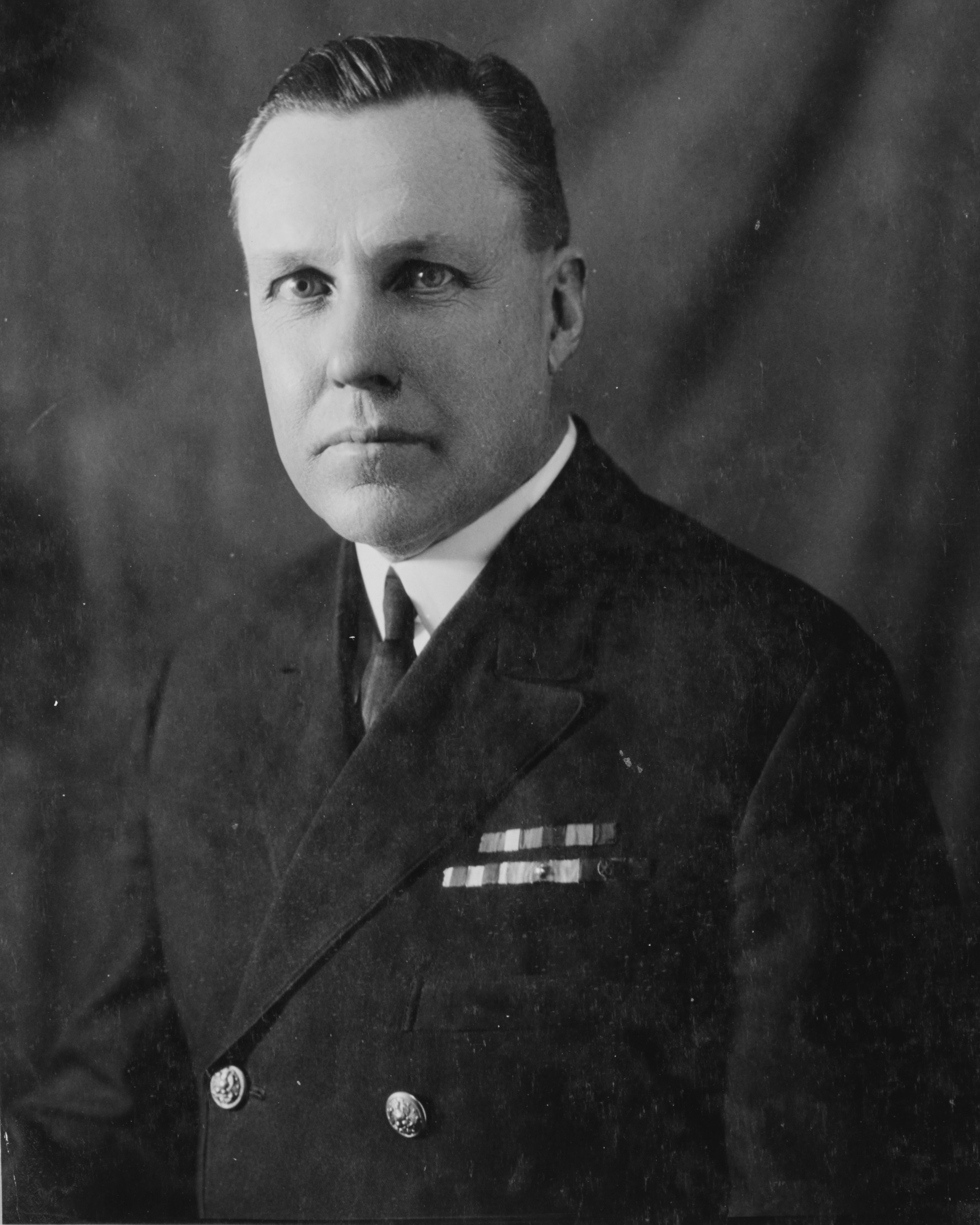
- Walter Vernou in November 1929
- Born: 10 February 1878; Fort Larned, Kansas, U.S.
- Died: 23 May 1955 (aged 77); Coronado, California, U.S.
- Military career
- Allegiance: United States of America
- Branch: United States Navy
- Service years: 1901–1942
- Rank: Vice Admiral
- Commands: BatDiv 2 CruDiv 3 USS Northampton; USS Pecos; USS Rizal; USS Sigourney; USS Cassin; USS Beale; USS Nicholson
- Conflicts: Spanish–American War; World War I World War II
- Awards: Distinguished Service Medal

Vice Admiral Walter Newhall Vernou (10 February 1878 – 23 May 1955) was a career officer in the United States Navy who served during the Spanish–American War, World War I and World War II.

== Biography ==
=== Early life ===
Vernou was born at Fort Larned, Pawnee County, Kansas, on 10 February 1878, son of Colonel Charles Alexander Vernou of the United States Army and a veteran of the American Civil War, and Lucy Mary (Lewis) Vernou. He received his early education from Post Schools at Fort Clark and Fort Ringgold, Texas; Rush's School in Philadelphia, Pennsylvania; Seeley's Academy, San Antonio, Texas; and Webster's and Detroit High School, in Detroit, Michigan.

=== Naval Academy and Spanish–American War ===
Vernou was appointed as a Naval Cadet from 12th Congressional District of Michigan and entered the United States Naval Academy in September 1897. While a Naval Cadet he was detached from the Naval Academy during the Spanish–American War in 1898 for active duty aboard the cruiser USS Newark, and later the gunboat USS Peoria. The Newark participated in the naval blockade of Cuba during the summer of 1898 and bombarded coastal targets.

=== Early career ===
Vernou graduated from the academy on 7 June 1901, he served the two years at sea, then required by law, before being commissioned as an Ensign from 7 June 1903. He graduated in June 1901, and served for five years at sea, with successive duty as a Passed Naval Cadet (later retitled Midshipman) on the battleship USS Alabama and the cruiser USS Olympia. After he was commissioned as an Ensign he served aboard the battleship USS Texas and the torpedo boat USS Nicholson, having command of the latter for four days before being detached on 24 June 1906.

Vernou returned to the Naval Academy on 10 July 1906, and for three years was an instructor in the Department of Ordnance and Gunnery there. He reported to the battleship USS New Hampshire on 8 June 1909, and after three years' duty in that battleship, reported for duty at the Norfolk Navy Yard in Portsmouth, Virginia. He assumed command of USS Beale on 29 June 1914, and on 2 July 1915, was transferred to command of the Fifth Division Torpedo Flotilla, Atlantic Fleet, for a short period. On 18 August he reported to USS Kansas where he served as the ship's navigator and was reassigned in December of the same year.

=== World War I ===
During World War I, Vernou had duty for two years in command of the destroyers USS Beale and USS Cassin, off the coast of Ireland, and with Naval Forces, France.

Vernou was awarded the Navy Distinguished Service Medal for an incident on 15 October 1917 in which the Cassin was attacked by a German U-Boat. A torpedo struck the stern of the Cassin causing her to run in a circle. Vernou returned fire and hit the submarine's conning tower which discouraged its commander from continuing the attack. Gunner's Mate First Class Osmond Ingram of the Cassin was posthumously awarded the Medal of Honor for heroism during the attack.

Reaching the United States aboard USS Bridge in December 1917, he had temporary duty in Washington, D C, before proceeding to Quincy, Massachusetts, to fit out USS Sigourney, then building at the Fore River Shipbuilding Company. He assumed command of that destroyer upon her commissioning on 15 May 1918, and remained in command until transferred on 28 August to temporary command of Squadron Three, Patrol Force and as District Commander Brest, France, on board USS Carola IV. He returned to command of Sigourney from 15 October 1918 until detached on 24 January 1919.

=== Interwar period ===
Vernou served a second tour of duty at the Naval Academy from January 1919 to June 1921. He then proceeded to sea duty as Executive Officer of the battleship USS Idaho, until 5 July 1922. Ordered to Asiatic Station, he was assigned to USS Rizal and the Mine Detachment. He commanded the Rizal from 12 September, that year, until 5 January 1923, when he was transferred to command the oiler USS Pecos. After a few months in that command, and brief duty at the Naval Station, Cavite, Philippine Islands, he returned to the United States in July 1923.

He then attended the Naval War College in Newport, Rhode Island, which was followed by duty on the staff there from 29 May 1924 until 2 July 1925. He then departed via San Francisco, California, for Shanghai, China. For the next two years, he had duty as Chief of Staff to Commander in Chief, Asiatic Fleet on board the cruiser USS Pittsburgh. He returned to the Naval War College for staff duty from October 1927 until May 1930.

Following duty in charge of fitting out the cruiser USS Northampton at the Bethlehem Shipbuilding Corporation, Quincy, Massachusetts, from 12 February 1930, he commanded that cruiser from her commissioning on 17 May 1930, until June 1932. He served as Naval Aide to both President Herbert Hoover and President Franklin D. Roosevelt for two years.

After attending the senior course at the Naval War College, Vernou was ordered to duty as Commander Cruiser Division Three, Battle Force, in the rank of Rear Admiral (to which he was promoted to date from 1 September 1934) reporting on 30 March 1935. On 10 June of the next year he assumed command of Cruisers, Battle Force, continuing in command of Cruiser Division Three until relieved of both commands on 22 June 1937. Vernou was then assigned as Commandant, Fifteenth Naval District, with additional duty as Commanding Officer of the Naval Station at Balboa in the Panama Canal Zone, from 4 September 1937 until 10 August 1939.

=== World War II ===
Vernou then took command of Battleship Division Two (with USS Tennessee (BB-43) as his flagship) at Pearl Harbor, Hawaii, until 31 January 1941 when he was reassigned to serve as Senior Member of the Board of Inspection and Survey, Pacific Coast Section in Long Beach, California, until 28 February 1942. During this assignment, the Japanese attacked Pearl Harbor on 7 December 1941 and the United States entered World War II.

Vernou was transferred to the Retired List of the Navy on 1 March 1942 having attained the statutory age of sixty-four years, and relieved of all active duty. Upon retirement, he received a "tombstone" promotion to the rank of Vice Admiral on the basis of having received a combat decoration.

Vernou was a hereditary Companion of the Military Order of the Loyal Legion of the United States by right of his father's service in the Union Army during the Civil War.

After retirement, Vice Admiral Vernou and his wife lived in Coronado, San Diego County, California. He died at his residence there on 23 May 1955.

== Personal ==
Vernou married Sidney Patterson Saunders (29 December 1876 – 24 April 1954) on May 27, 1903, in Annapolis, Maryland. Her father John Selden Saunders was the 17th Adjutant General of Maryland and a former Confederate States Army officer. After their deaths, Vernou and his wife were interred at Fort Rosecrans National Cemetery.

== Awards ==
- Navy Distinguished Service Medal
- Sampson Medal (USS Newark)
- Spanish Campaign Medal
- World War I Victory Medal with "Destroyer" clasp (USS Sigourney)
- Yangtze Service Medal (USS Pittsburgh)
- American Defense Service Medal with "FLEET" clasp.
- American Campaign Medal
- World War II Victory Medal
- Order of Abdon Calderón, First Class and diploma (Ecuador)
- Order of the Crown (Belgium).

=== Distinguished Service Medal citation ===
For exceptionally meritorious service in a duty of great responsibility as Commanding Officer of the USS CASSIN engaged in the important, exacting and hazardous duty of patrolling the waters infested with enemy submarines and mines, in escorting and protecting vitally important convoys of troops and supplies through these waters, and in offensive and defensive action, vigorously and unremittingly prosecuted against all forms of enemy naval activity; and especially for a successful engagement with a German submarine on October 15th, 1917.
