= Albert G. Noble =

Albert Gallatin Noble
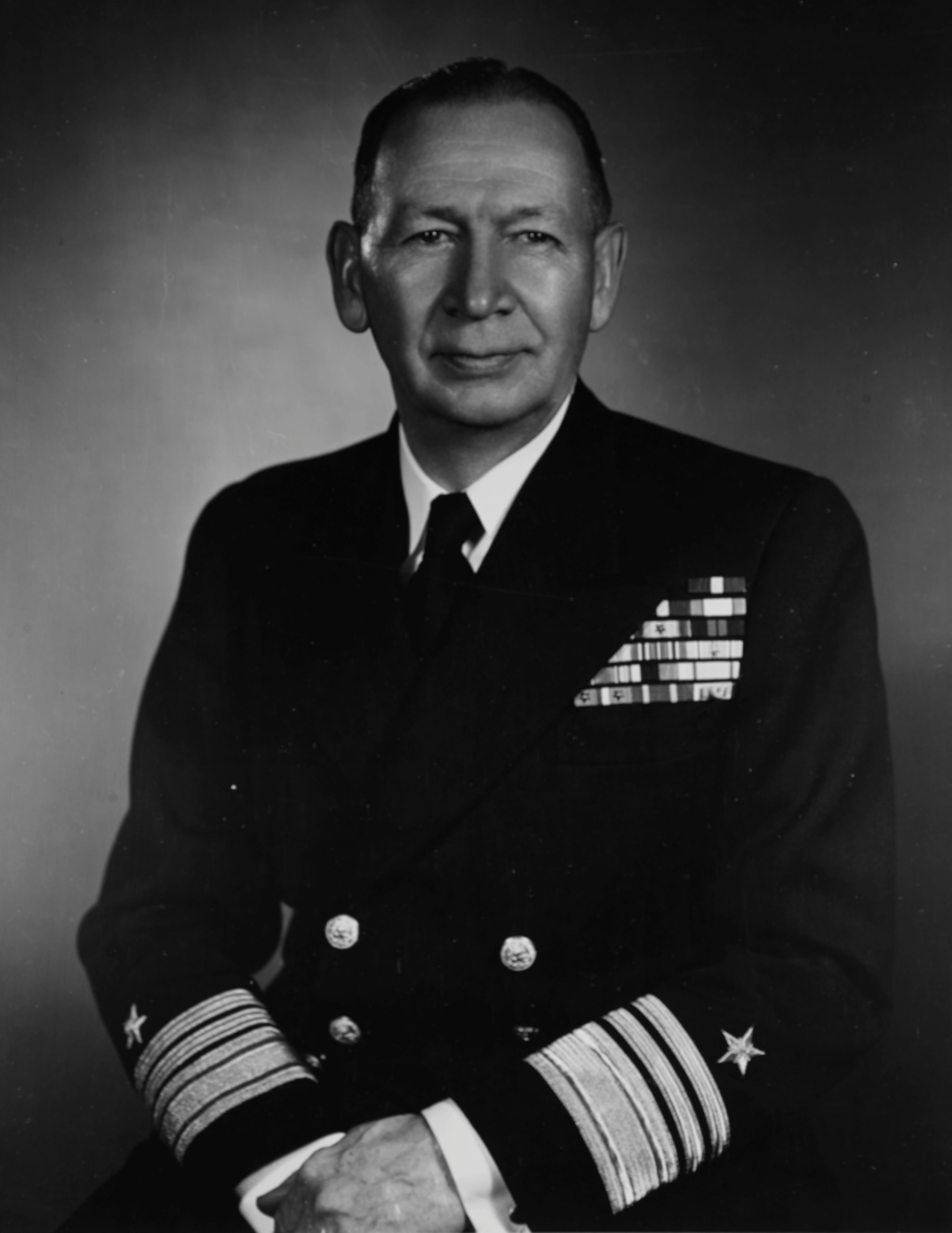
- Vice Admiral Noble in 1951
- Born: December 14, 1895; Preston, Texas, U.S.
- Died: February 22, 1980 (aged 84); Washington, D.C., U.S.
- Burial place: United States Naval Academy Cemetery
- Military career
- Allegiance: United States
- Branch: United States Navy
- Service years: 1917–1951
- Rank: Admiral
- Commands: Dallas (DD-199); Cassin (DD-372)
- Conflicts: World War I World War II
- Awards: Navy Cross; Army Distinguished Service Medal; Navy Distinguished Service Medal; Legion of Merit (4)

Admiral Albert Gallatin Noble (December 14, 1895 – February 22, 1980) was a United States Navy admiral who was promoted to four star rank as a "tombstone admiral".

== Biography ==
Noble was born in Preston, Texas to Albert G. and Sallie Wilson Noble. After graduating from Ardmore High School in Ardmore, Oklahoma, he received an appointment to the United States Naval Academy in 1913. He graduated and was commissioned an ensign on March 29, 1917, and was assigned to the battleship Delaware (BB-28). In November 1921 he was accepted into Massachusetts Institute of Technology where in June 1923 he received a degree of Master of Science in mechanical engineering. After graduation, he joined the Florida (BB-30) In June 1924. In September 1924, he received an appointment as aide to the commander of the Procyon (AG-11). In July 1930, he joined the Pruitt (DD-347) for duty as executive officer. From June 1931 until May 1933 he served as aide and flag secretary on the staff of commander, Cruiser Division 3, Scouting Force assigned to the Omaha (CL-4). In 1935, he was the commander of the Dallas (DD-199), and in July 1936 he became the commander of the Cassin (DD-372), which he commanded from August 21, 1936, until June 1937.

During World War II Noble was commander of Aitape Attack Force in April 1944, commanded a Naval Attack Group during the battle of Wakde in May 1944, and was Commander of Amphibious Group Eight, during operations against enemy forces in Mindanao and Balikpapan in mid-1945. Noble received the Navy Cross in 1944.

Noble was promoted to vice admiral on December 29, 1950, in charge of the Office of Naval Material. He retired on October 1, 1951, and was advanced to admiral based on his combat service.

Noble died in Washington, D.C., on February 22, 1980. He was married to Madeline Martin. They had one daughter. He was buried at the United States Naval Academy Cemetery.
