= USS Osmond Ingram =

Tender of the United States Navy

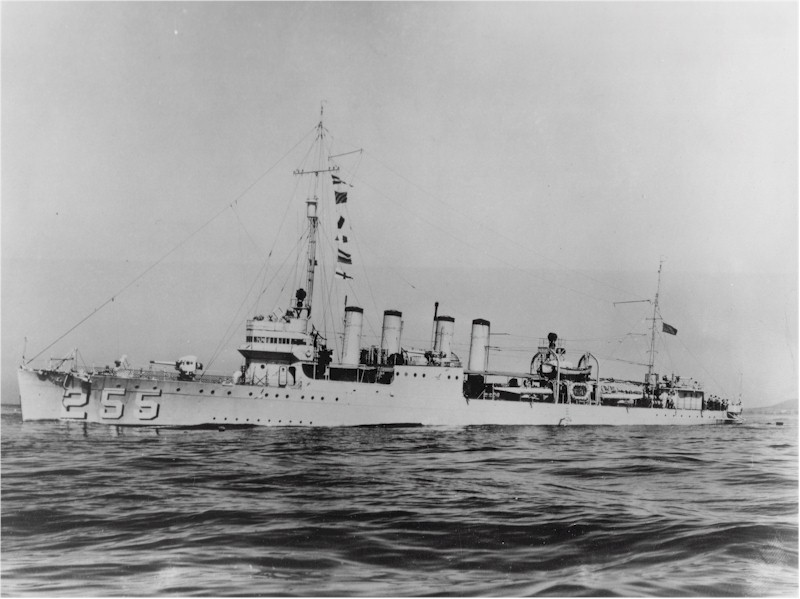
- USS Osmond Ingram

History

United States
- Namesake: Osmond Ingram
- Builder: Bethlehem Shipbuilding Corporation, Fore River Shipyard, Quincy
- Laid down: 15 October 1918
- Launched: 23 February 1919
- Commissioned: 28 June 1919
- Decommissioned: 24 June 1922
- Recommissioned: 22 November 1940
- Decommissioned: 8 January 1946
- Stricken: 21 January 1946
- Fate: Sold for scrapping, 17 June 1946

General characteristics
- Class & type: Clemson-class destroyer
- Displacement: 1,215 tons
- Length: 314 feet 4 inches (95.81 m)
- Beam: 31 feet 8 inches (9.65 m)
- Draft: 9 feet 10 inches (3.00 m)
- Propulsion: 26,500 shp (20 MW); geared turbines, 2 screws
- Speed: 35 knots (65 km/h)
- Range: 4,900 nautical miles (9,100 kilometres); @ 15 kt
- Complement: 122 officers and enlisted
- Armament: 4 x 4 in (100 mm) guns, 1 x 3 in (76 mm) gun, 12 x 21 inch (533 mm) tt.

USS Osmond Ingram (DD-255/AVD–9/APD-35) was a Clemson-class destroyer in the United States Navy during World War II. She was named for Gunners Mate First Class Osmond Ingram, who posthumously received the Medal of Honor.

== Construction and commissioning ==
Osmond Ingram was laid down 15 October 1918 by Bethlehem Shipbuilding Corporation's Fore River Shipyard in Quincy, Massachusetts; launched 23 February 1919; sponsored by Mrs. N. E. Ingram, mother of Osmond Ingram; and commissioned at Boston 28 June 1919. She was designated AVD–9 from 2 August 1940 until 4 November 1943; reverted to DD–255 until 22 June 1944; and completed her service as APD–35.

== History ==
After several years’ Atlantic service in fleet operations, Osmond Ingram decommissioned 24 June 1922 and went into reserve at Philadelphia. Converted to seaplane tender, she recommissioned 22 November 1940 and sailed for San Juan, Puerto Rico, her home port from 15 January 1941. She tended patrol planes through the area bounded by Trinidad, Antigua, and San Juan, then sailed to base in the Panama Canal Zone tending patrol craft at Salinas, Ecuador, and in the Galápagos Islands through June 1942.

Returning to destroyer functions, she completed 1942 on escort duty between Trinidad and Recife and Belém, then sailed north to NS Argentia, Newfoundland, to join the offensive antisubmarine warfare patrol formed around Bogue, one of the most effective of the antisubmarine forces that ranged the Atlantic that ultimately defeated the U-boats and secured the passage of the men and goods across the Atlantic, vital to triumph in Europe. Osmond Ingram sank her first submarine, U-172, with gunfire 13 December 1943 after she had been forced to surface by depth charge attacks. This and similar outstanding performance of duty by her sisters brought the group a Presidential Unit Citation (US).

After a convoy to Gibraltar early in 1944, Osmond Ingram served on escort duty between New York and Trinidad until June, when she entered Charleston Navy Yard for conversion to a high speed transport. She joined amphibious forces in the Mediterranean in time for the pre-invasion assaults on islands off the French coast 14 August 1944, then escorted convoys along the French and Italian coasts until returning Norfolk, Virginia late in December.

Now assigned to the Pacific, Osmond Ingram continued her war service with escort duty en route New York via Panama to San Diego, Pearl Harbor, Eniwetok, and Ulithi. She sailed 2 April 1945 with an assault force for Okinawa, and until that island was secured, alternately escorted fast convoys to Saipan and Guam and patrolled the seaward defense lines for Hagushi Anchorage. During July, she escorted ships between Leyte and Hollandia, New Guinea; in August, began patrols through the Philippines and to Borneo. After the end of the war she aided in the occupation of Japan, calling at Wakayama, Kure, and Nagoya until sailing for home.

== Fate ==
Osmond Ingram decommissioned at Philadelphia 8 January 1946, was struck from the Navy List 21 January 1946, and was sold for scrapping to Hugo Neu 17 June 1946.

Osmond Ingram received 6 battle stars and the Presidential Unit Citation for World War II service.
