= Joseph Tarbell =

United States Navy officer

- Born: 16 September 1773; Groton, Massachusetts, British America
- Died: 24 November 1815; Norfolk, Virginia, US
- Spouse(s): Eliza Ann Cassin, m. 1808 (September 1789 – 3 October 1821)
- Military career
- Allegiance: United States
- Branch: United States Navy
- Service years: 1798–1815
- Rank: Captain
- Commands: USS Constellation; Gosport gunboat flotilla
- Conflicts: First Barbary War: Second Battle of Tripoli Harbor; War of 1812: Battle of Craney Island

Joseph Tarbell (16 September 1773 – 24 November 1815) was an officer in the United States Navy during the First Barbary War and the War of 1812.

== Early life ==
Tarbell was born in Groton, Massachusetts on 16 September 1773. He was married to Elizabeth Ann Cassin, daughter of Commodore John Cassin and sister of Stephen Cassin.

== Military career ==
Tarbell was appointed midshipman on board of USS Constitution in the United States Navy on 5 December 1798. Tarbel became an officer in the rank of lieutenant on 25 August 1800.

=== First Barbary War ===
He served in Constitution and other ships of the Mediterranean Squadron from 1800 to 1804, at the height of America's war with Tripoli. Under Commodore Edward Preble's command, he took part in the 1804 blockade of Tripoli and was among those honored by Congress for services rendered during that action.

=== Between the wars ===
On 3 March 1805 Tarbell was promoted to master commandant. In 1808, he married Elizabeth Ann Cassin, who was Commodore John Cassin's daughter and Stephen Cassin's sister.

After the war, in 1806, Tarbell was appointed master of the Washington Naval Yard. In 1811-1812 (maybe even until 1813), he was commanding the controversial repair of USS John Adams.

=== War of 1812 ===
In 1813, Tarbell temporarily was appointed to command USS Constellation. He also was the commanding officer of the Gosport gunboat flotilla.

From 19 to 23 June 1813 Tarbell commanded a boat expedition against the British squadron off Craney Island and in the James River. On the 20th his flotilla of fifteen gunboats had a 45-minute engagement with the British frigate Junon. The other British frigates joined the engagement forcing the American gunboats to retire. The British and American accounts of this particular engagement differ greatly. On 22 June 1813, Tarbell commanded USS Constellation in the battle of Craney Island, which was won by the Americans. He was commended by his superior, Commodore Stephen Cassin, and by the army officers ashore (Lt Col Henry Beatty) for his gallantry and assistance in the defense of Craney Island. On 23 July 1813, James Madison nominated Tarbell for the rank of captain effective 24 July 1813.

== Death and legacy ==
Captain Tarbell died at Norfolk or Washington D.C., on 24 November 1815 and is buried at the Catholic burying ground of St. Patrick's Church.

USS Tarbell (DD-142) was named for him.
