= Helen Lombard =

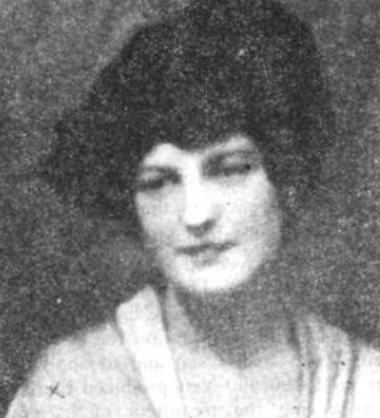
- Lombard in 1924
- Born: Helen Cassin Carusi; October 25, 1904; Washington, D.C., U.S.
- Died: May 11, 1986 (aged 81); La Plata, Maryland, U.S.
- Occupation: Journalist
- Spouses: Emanuel Eugene Lombard (m. 1927; died 1946): Constantine Brown; Peter Vischer (m. 1951; died 1967)
- Relatives: Stephen Cassin (great-grandfather)

Helen Lombard, born Helen Cassin Carusi and later known as Helen Carusi Vischer (October 25, 1904 – May 11, 1986) was an American journalist, best known for her insider's book of Washington gossip, Washington Waltz (1941).

== Background ==
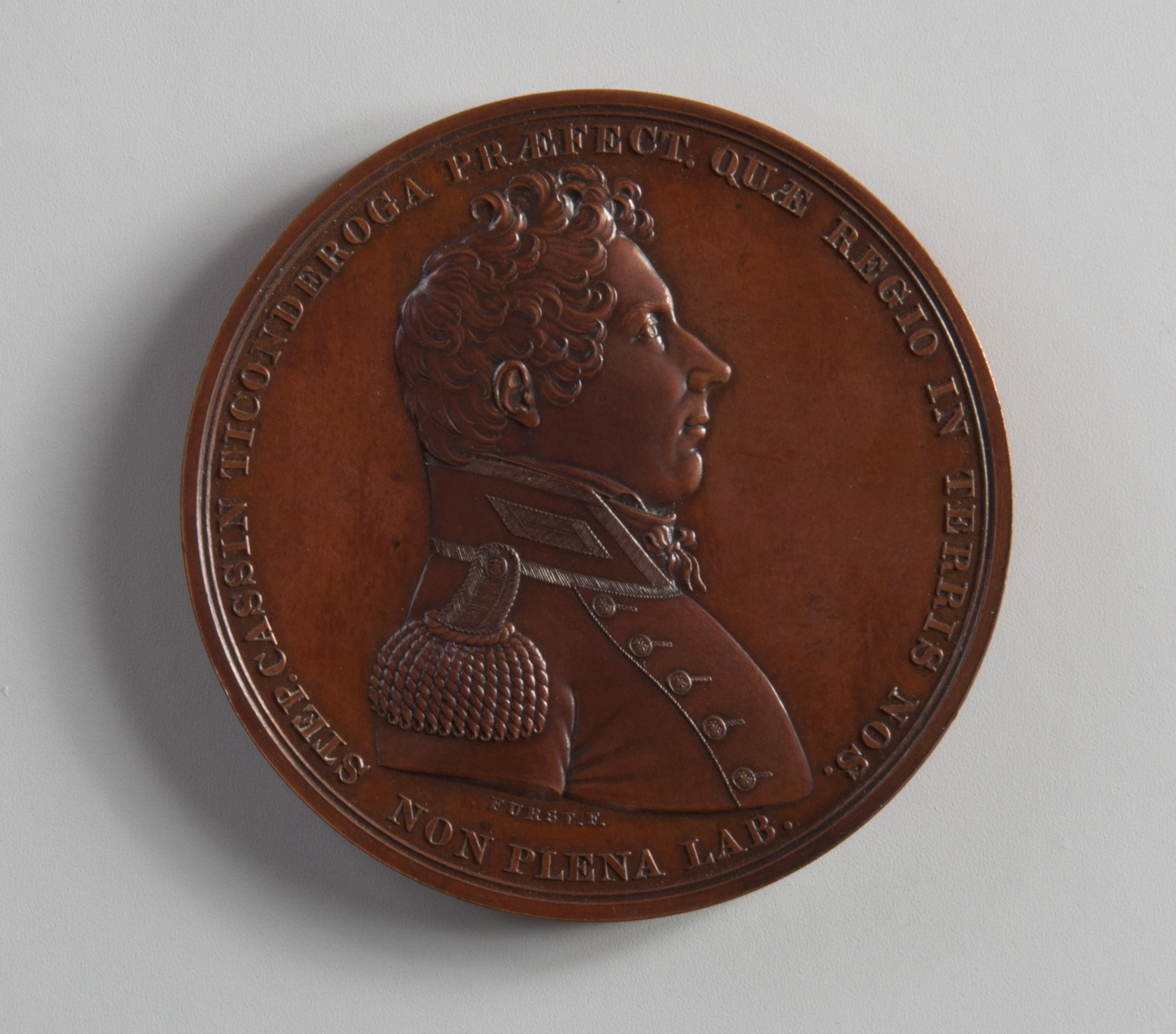
Lombard was a grandchild of Stephen Cassin (here, undated Medal of Lieutenant Stephen Cassin [MET LC-83 2 380-001] in the Metropolitan Museum of Art, a hero of the First Barbary War and the War of 1812.

Helen Cassin Carusi was born in 1904 or 1905 in Washington, D.C. Her father, Charles Francis Carusi, was chancellor of National University and a member of the Washington, D.C. Board of Education. Her great-grandfather was Stephen Cassin (1783–1857), a United States Navy officer during the First Barbary War and the War of 1812. Lombard attended Holton-Arms School.

== Career ==
In 1913, young Helen Cassin Carusi christened the USS Cassin (DD-43). In 1935, she christened the USS Cassin (DD-372).

In 1951, after marrying Peter Vischer, the two moved to the "Habre de Venture" historic house in Port Tobacco, Maryland and raised thoroughbred horses in Charles County, Maryland.

== Personal life and death ==
In 1927 Helen Cassin Carusi married Colonel Emanuel Eugene Lombard, a French diplomat (military attaché) who died in 1946; they had a son, Charles Francis Lombard. By 1947, she had married Washington columnist Constantine Brown, but they divorced. In 1951, she married Peter Vischer, a former Army colonel and State Department official (died 1967); he had a daughter from a previous marriage, Joanna Vischer Brown.

Lombard was a member of the Daughters of the American Revolution, the Society of Daughters of 1812, the Charles County Children's Aid Society, and the Charles County Garden Club.

In 1977, Lombard moved to the Charles County Nursing Home in La Plata, Maryland, where, known as Helen C. Vischer, she died age 81 on May 11, 1986.

== Legacy ==
On March 31, 1947, conservative US Representative George Anthony Dondero called Lombard herself (by then, "Mrs. Brown") "one of the best known women in Washington, herself a scribe of wide experience, brilliant author of a book entitled Washington Waltz... [and] While They Fought."

== Works ==
Lombard published two books: Washington Waltz, which recounted her life as a Washington hostess, and While They Fought, which recounted events during World War II. The liberal New Yorker deemed While They Fought "rather untidy" and largely "undocumented", while the conservative Human Events found it "valuable". While They Fought came out no later than March 1947, when Representative Dondero mentioned it publicly.

Books

- Washington Waltz (1941)
- While They Fought (1947)

== See also ==
- USS Cassin (DD-43)
- USS Cassin (DD-372)
