= SS Castilian (1890) =

History
- Name: SS Umbilo (1890-; SS Castilian
- Operator: Bullard, King & Co., London(1890-1909); Ellerman Lines Ltd., London (1909-1917)
- Builder: William Gray & Company, West Hartlepool
- Yard number: 379
- Launched: 21 January 1890
- Fate: Sunk on 18 April 1917

General characteristics
- Type: Cargo ship
- Tonnage: 1,923 GRT; 1,232 NRT
- Length: 270.4 ft (82.4 m)
- Beam: 37.5 ft (11.4 m)
- Depth: 16.2 ft (4.9 m)
- Propulsion: T3cyl (22.5, 35, 59 x 39in), 232nhp, 1 screw

SS Castilian was a ship sunk by German submarine SM U-61 off Ireland in 1917.

She was built in 1890 as the Umbilo for the Natal Direct Line that in the 1890s plied the route between Durban in South Africa and London, also calling at St Helena. Umbilo is a district of Durban, South Africa. It was on the Umbilo that Dinuzulu kaCetshwayo, King of the Zulus, and his party returned to Natal in 1898 after seven years exile on St Helena. The ship featured on a postage stamp of St Helena in 2004.
