= Earl of Dunmore (ship) =

Four-masted steel-hulled barque

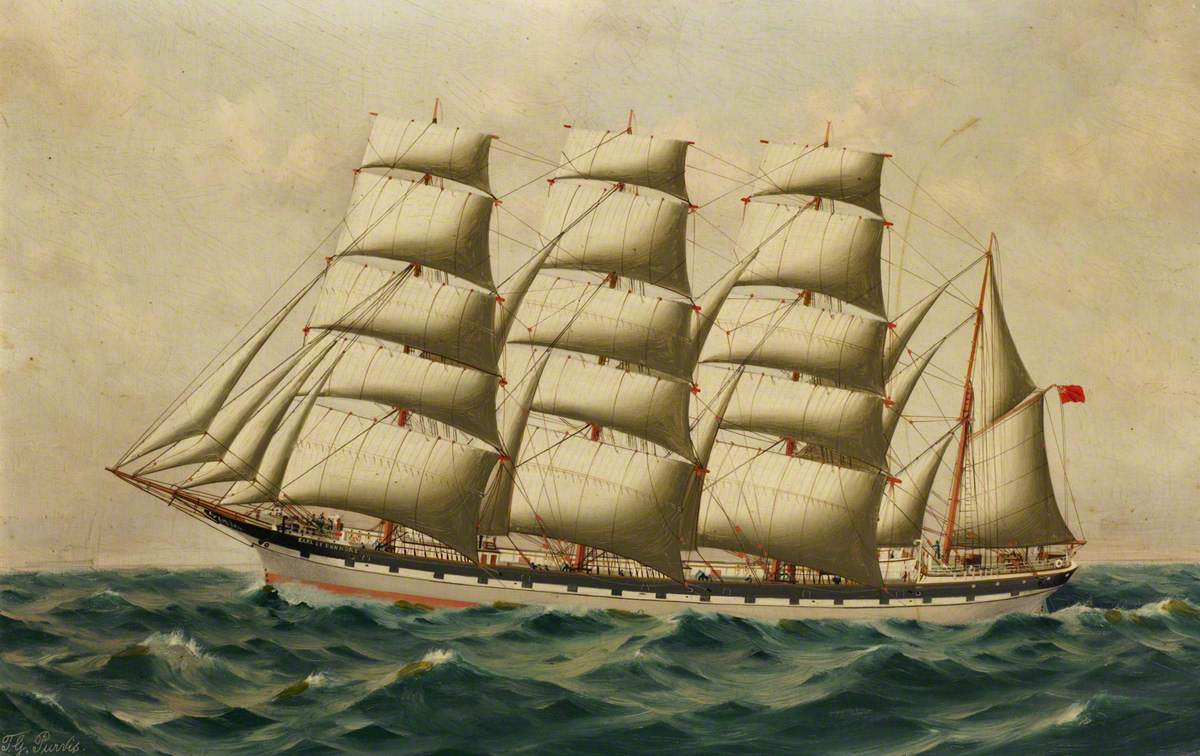
- An illustration of Earl of Dunmore by artist T. G. Purvis

History
- Name: Earl of Dunmore; Spartan
- Owner: Sailing Ship Earl of Dunmore Company Ltd (1891–1907); Sailship Earl of Dunmore (John Malcolm) (1907–1911); Skibs A/S Spartan (Grefstad & Herlofson) (1911–1914); Skibs A/S Spartan (Carl Bech & Co.) (1914–1916); Rederi A/S (Carl Beck & Co.) (1916–1917)
- Port of registry: (United Kingdom of Great Britain and Ireland) Glasgow (1891); Arendal, Norway (1911); Tvedestrand, Norway (1914)
- Builder: Russell & Co, Greenock, Scotland
- Yard number: 265
- Launched: 14 May 1891
- Out of service: 9 March 1917
- Identification: Official ID #1098634
- Fate: Sunk, 9 March 1917

General characteristics
- Type: Four-masted barque
- Tonnage: 2,287 GRT 2,205 NRT
- Length: 277.9 ft (84.7 m)
- Beam: 42.1 ft (12.8 m)
- Depth: 24.2 ft (7.4 m)
- Sail plan: Barque-rigged

Earl of Dunmore was four-masted steel-hulled barque, built in 1891. She survived three cargo fires. She was renamed Spartan in 1911 and was sunk by the German submarine U-61 in 1917.

== Builders and owners ==
Earl of Dunmore was built in 1891, by Russell & Co. at their yard in Cartsdyke Yard, Greenock, Scotland, for her new owners, Sailing Ship Earl of Dunmore Company Ltd of Glasgow. In 1907, she was sold to Sailship Earl of Dunmore (John Malcolm), of Glasgow.

She was sold to Norwegian owners, Skibs A/S Spartan (Grefstad & Herlofson) of Arendal, Norway, in 1911, and renamed Spartan. She was sold again to Skibs A/S Spartan (Carl Bech & Co.) of Tvedestrand, in 1914. Ownership was transferred to another Carl Beck & Co. entity, Rederi A/S, of Tvedestrand, in 1916.

== Operational history ==
Earl of Dunmore was used on the clipper route, mainly from Australia to Great Britain. After being repaired after the 1903 fire, she carried coal from Newcastle to Tocapilla in Chile. As Spartan, she was used to carry ore from New Caledonia to Europe, and later she was used on the trans-Atlantic route.

The first fire occurred, while loading a cargo of jute, at the port of Chittagong on 5 January 1892. Bound for London from Melbourne, her cargo caught fire, while at sea, on 21 March 1901. After she was battened down, the fire burned for two days. Most of her cargo had been destroyed and her deck plates were buckled, but she arrived safely, in London, in June 1901.

In August 1903, the ship was carrying an inflammable cargo when she caught fire in Sydney Harbour. The burning cargo in the forehold included oils, turpentine, and tar, but the ship was also carrying 130 tons of dynamite and gunpowder that did not detonate. With the fire well alight, the hoses that could be deployed were inadequate, and it was decided to flood the hold. She was towed to and beached at Rose Bay. The fire was then extinguished, by pumping water aboard her, from the fire tug Pluvius, the tug Hero, and the pilot boat Captain Cook, but the vessel was gutted. She was repaired at Mort's Dock, and in January 1904 she resumed service.

=== Fate ===
On 9 March 1917, Spartan was sunk by the German submarine U-61, south-west of Fastnet Rock at 50°26′N 10°45′W, while en route from New York to Birkenhead with a cargo of case oil. She was first stopped and then torpedoed. Her crew took to two lifeboats, one of which landed on Cape Clear Island and the other at nearby Baltimore, County Cork, Ireland.
