= Osmond Ingram =

United States Navy Medal of Honor recipient

Osmond Kelly Ingram
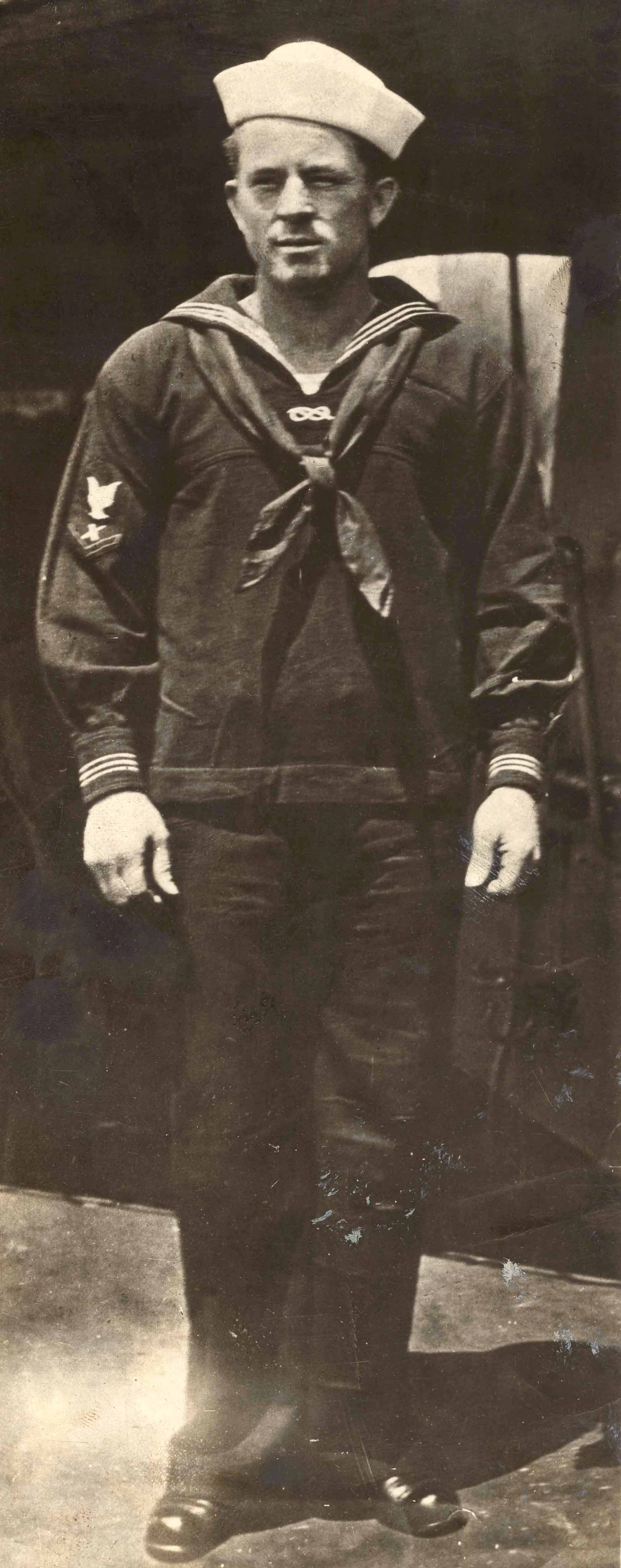
- Born: August 4, 1887; Oneonta, Alabama, U.S.
- Died: October 15, 1917 (aged 30); USS Cassin, Celtic Sea, off Ireland
- Military career
- Allegiance: United States of America
- Branch: United States Navy
- Service years: 1903–1917
- Rank: Gunner's mate first class
- Unit: USS Cassin
- Conflicts: World War I: Naval campaign; Atlantic U-boat Campaign; Action of 15 October 1917 †
- Awards: Medal of Honor

Osmond Kelly Ingram (August 4, 1887 – October 15, 1917) was a sailor in the United States Navy during World War I who received the Medal of Honor posthumously. He was the first American sailor to die in World War I.

== Biography ==
Born to Robert L. Ingram and his wife Naomi Elizabeth Lea in Oneonta, Alabama, Ingram entered the Navy November 24, 1903. His ship, USS Cassin, was attacked by the German submarine U-61 off Ireland on October 15, 1917. Gunner's Mate First Class Ingram spotted the approaching torpedo, realized it would strike close by the ship's depth charges, thus dooming the ship, and rushed to jettison the ammunition. He was blown overboard when the torpedo struck, thus becoming the United States' Navy's first enlisted man killed in action in World War I as he attempted to save his ship and shipmates. He posthumously received the Medal of Honor for his actions on that day.

== Legacy ==
The main flagpole and colors at the former Naval Training Center, San Diego are named Ingram Plaza in his honor

USS Osmond Ingram (DD-255), a Clemson-class destroyer, served in the United States Navy during World War II. Osmond Ingram was decommissioned at Philadelphia on January 8, 1946, and was struck from the Navy List on January 21, 1946. It was sold for scrapping to Hugo Neu June 17, 1946.

Kelly Ingram Park is also named in his honor. It is a 4-acre (1.6 ha) park located in Birmingham, Alabama.

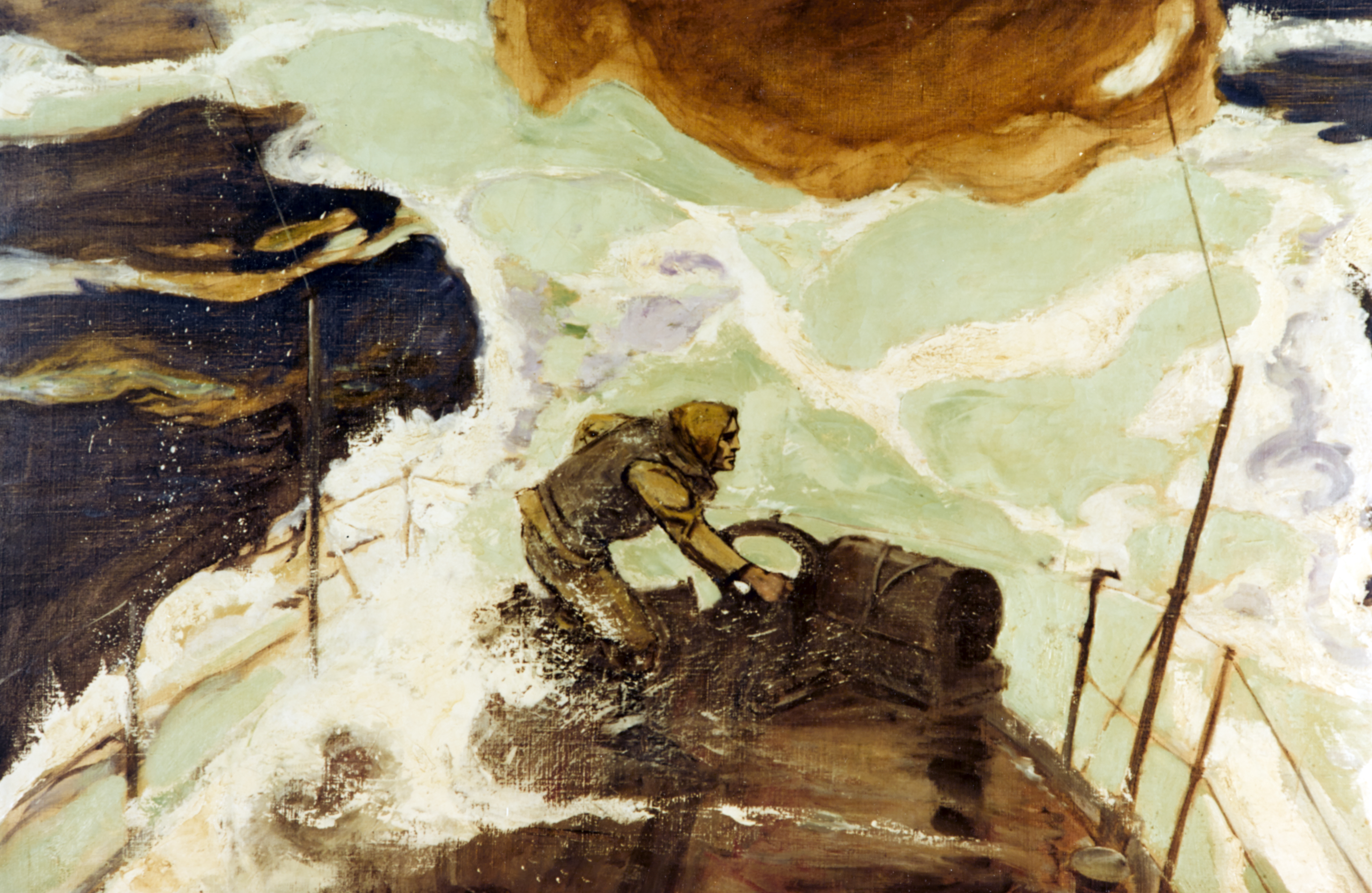
Illustrator C. B. Falls painted the incident aboard USS Cassin when Ingram lost his life.

There is a Veterans of Foreign Wars post named after him in Birmingham, Alabama.

== Medal of Honor citation ==
Rank and organization: Gunner's Mate First Class, U.S. Navy. Born: August 4, 1887, Alabama. Accredited to. Alabama.

Citation:

For extraordinary heroism in the presence of the enemy on the occasion of the torpedoing of the Cassin, on 15 October 1917. While the Cassin was searching for the submarine, Ingram sighted the torpedo coming, and realizing that it might strike the ship aft in the vicinity of the depth charges, ran aft with the intention of releasing the depth charges before the torpedo could reach the Cassin. The torpedo struck the ship before he could accomplish his purpose and Ingram was killed by the explosion. The depth charges exploded immediately afterward. His life was sacrificed in an attempt to save the ship and his shipmates, as the damage to the ship would have been much less if he had been able to release the depth charges.

== See also ==
- List of Medal of Honor recipients
- List of Medal of Honor recipients for World War I
