= USS Cassin (DD-372) =

Mahan-class destroyer

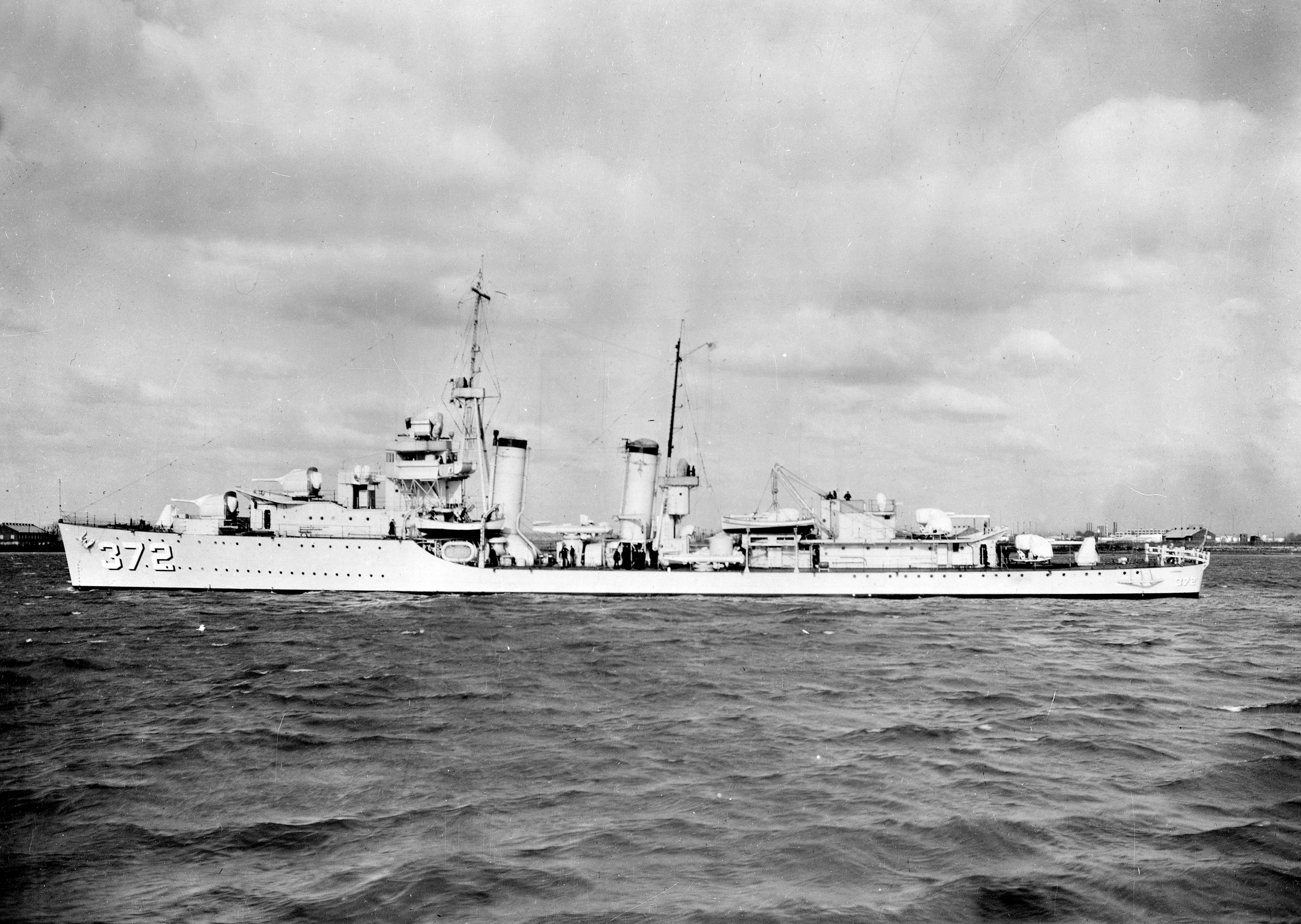

History

United States
- Name: Cassin
- Namesake: Stephen Cassin
- Builder: Philadelphia Navy Yard
- Rebuilder: Mare Island Naval Shipyard
- Laid down: 1 October 1934
- Launched: 28 October 1935
- Commissioned: 21 August 1936
- Decommissioned: 7 December 1941
- Recommissioned: 15 November 1943
- Decommissioned: 17 December 1945
- Fate: Sold for scrap, 25 November 1947

General characteristics
- Class & type: Mahan-class destroyer
- Displacement: 1,500 long tons (1,500 t)
- Length: 341 ft 4 in (104.04 m)
- Beam: 35 ft (11 m)
- Draft: 9 ft 10 in (3.00 m)
- Speed: 37 knots (69 km/h; 43 mph)
- Complement: 158 officers and crew
- Armament: As built: 1 × gun director above bridge, 5 × 5" (127 mm)/38 cal DP (5×1), 12 × 21 in (533 mm) torpedo tubes (3×4), 4 × .50 cal (12.7 mm) AA machine guns (4×1), 2 × depth charge stern racks, c1944: 1 × Mk37 Gun Fire Control System, 4 × 5" (127 mm)/38cal DP (4×1), 12 × 21" (533 mm) torpedo tubes (3×4), 2 × Mk51 Gun Directors, 4 × Bofors 40 mm guns (2×2), 6 × Oerlikon 20 mm cannons (6×1), 2 × depth charge roll-off stern racks, 4 × K-gun depth charge projectors

USS Cassin (DD-372) was a Mahan-class destroyer in the United States Navy before and during World War II. She was the second ship named for Stephen Cassin, an officer in the United States Navy.

Cassin was launched at the Philadelphia Navy Yard on 28 October 1935. She was sponsored by Stephen Cassin's great-granddaughter, Mrs. Helen Cassin Carusi Lombard, and commissioned 21 August 1936, with Lieutenant Commander A. G. Noble in command. Mrs. Lombard, at age nine, had also sponsored the first Cassin (DD-43) in 1913.

== Service history ==
Cassin underwent alterations until March 1937, then cruised to the Caribbean and Brazil.

On 18 August 1937 the Cassin was in dry dock #2 at the Philadelphia Navy Yard when she suffered a ruptured steam line. Four civilians in the engine room were killed. Ten more, both sailors and civilians were injured.

In April 1938 she joined the fleet at Pearl Harbor for the annual fleet exercises in the Hawaiian Islands and the Panama Canal Zone. During 1939, she operated on the West Coast with torpedo and gunnery schools, and on 1 April 1940 was assigned to the Hawaiian Detachment. Cassin sailed on maneuvers and patrol in the Pacific, cruising from February to April 1941 to Samoa, Australia, and Fiji. Fall of 1941 found her calling at West Coast ports.

=== World War II ===
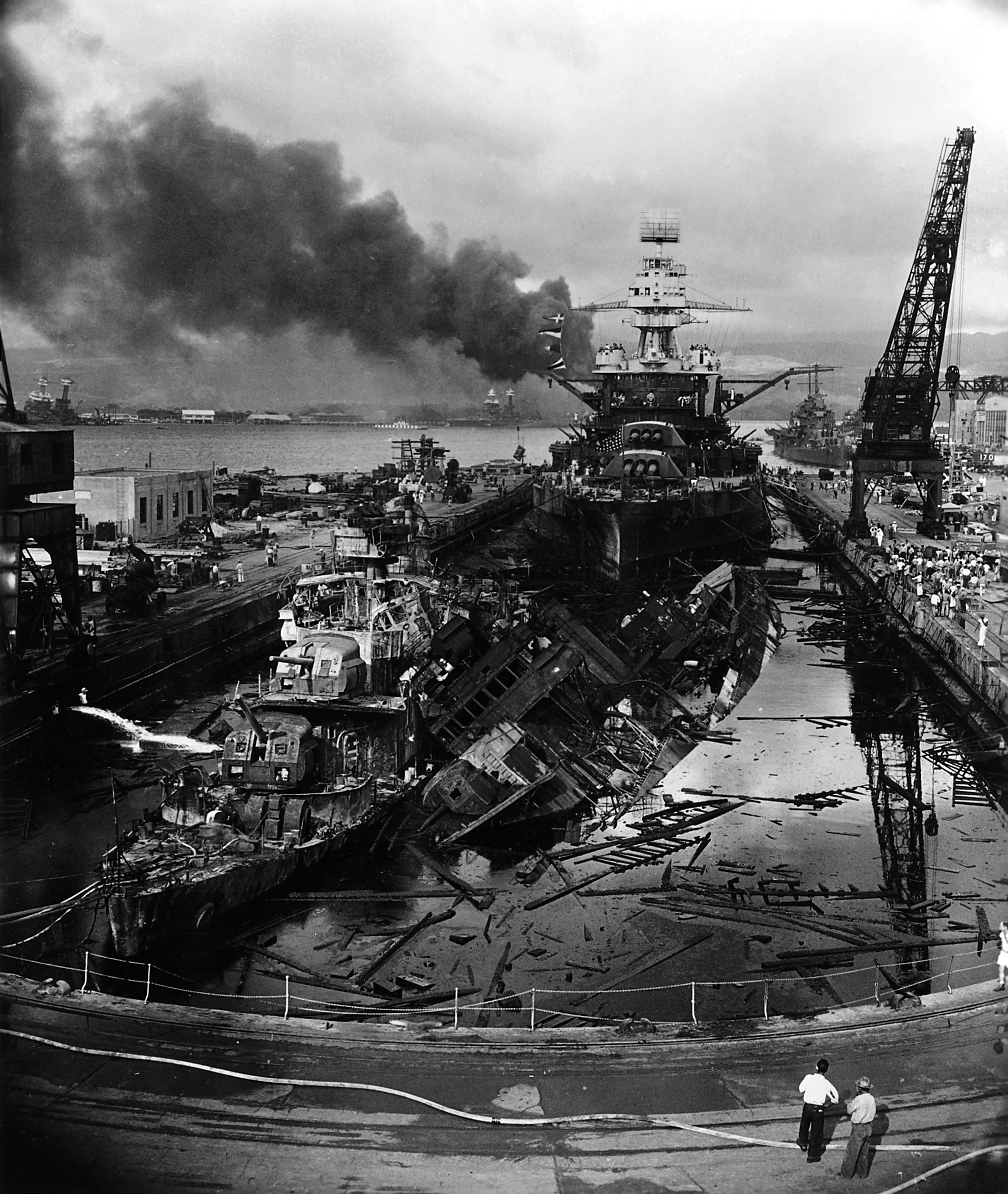
Cassin (R), Downes (L) and Pennsylvania in the aftermath of the attack on Pearl Harbor

Cassin was in drydock with Downes and Pennsylvania at Pearl Harbor during the Japanese attack on 7 December 1941. During the attack, a low order detonation by a 250 kg (550 lb) bomb on Downes ruptured her fuel tanks, causing uncontrollable fires on board both Downes and Cassin. Cassin slipped from her keel blocks and rested against Downes. Both ships were considered lost, and Cassin was decommissioned as of 7 December 1941. Both ship's hulls were damaged beyond repair but machinery and equipment were salvaged and sent to Mare Island Navy Yard where entirely new ships were built around the salvaged material and given the wrecked ship's names and hull numbers.

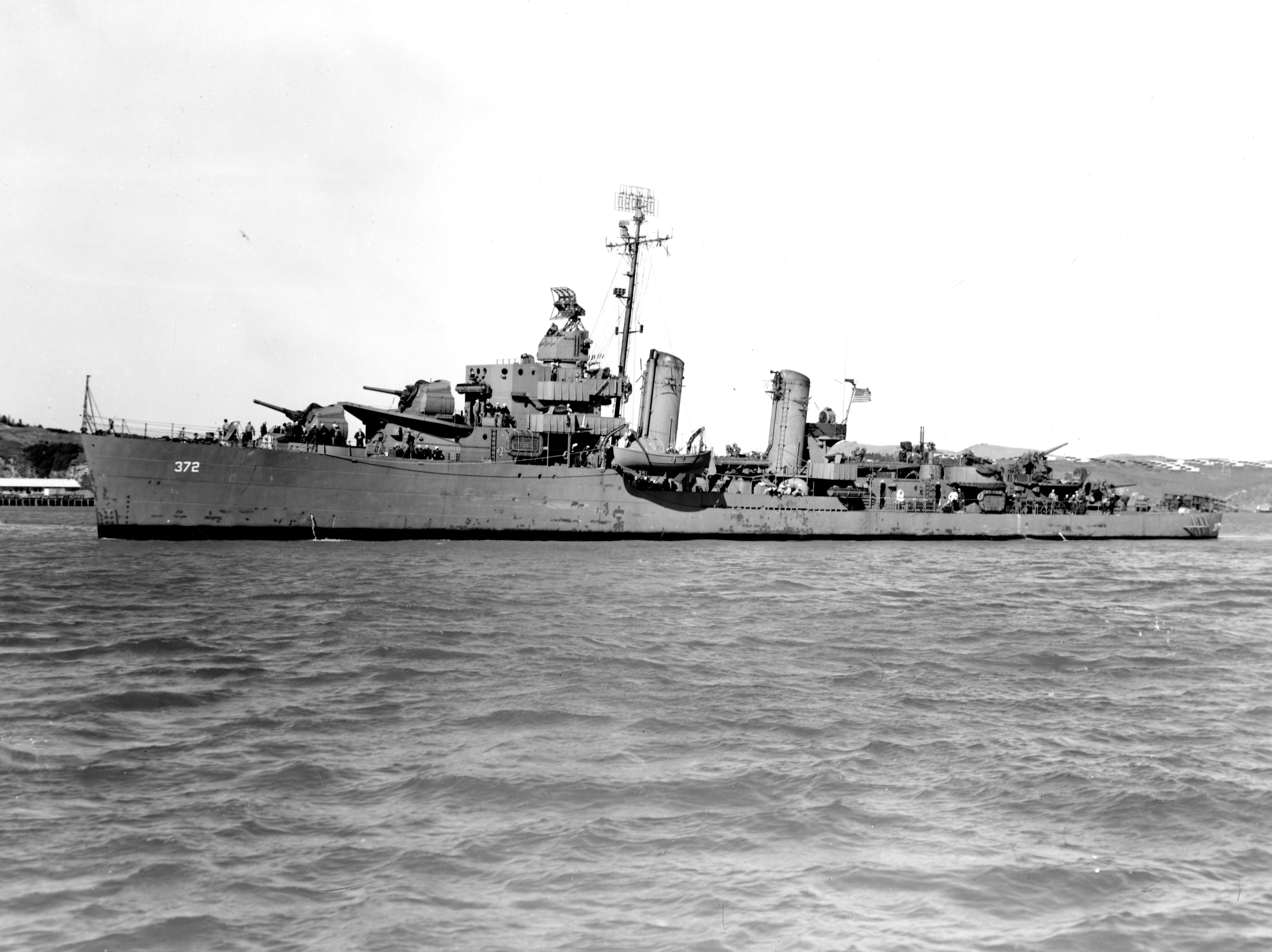
Cassin at Mare Island, 26 February 1944

Recommissioned 5 February 1944, Cassin reported at Pearl Harbor 22 April, and was assigned escort duty from Majuro until August. By shooting out caves and bombarding Aguijan, she aided in the consolidation of Tinian from 15 – 25 August, and then assumed escort duties out of Saipan. She took part in the bombardment of Marcus Island on 9 October. With the same force which had struck at Marcus, Cassin sailed on to join TG 38.1 on 16 October. Cassin steamed northeast of Luzon during the Leyte landings, and when the landings had been successfully launched, was dispatched with her group to refuel and replenish at Ulithi. However, when TF 38 made contact with the Japanese Center Force rounding the southern cape of Mindoro, bound for its part in the Battle for Leyte Gulf, Cassin's group was recalled to join the approaching action. In the afternoon of 25 October, her group at last reached position to launch aircraft which attacked the Japanese ships in one of the longest-range carrier strikes of the war.

Cassin's next assignment was to the preparations for the assault on Iwo Jima. On the night of 11–12 November 1944, and again on 24 January 1945, she bombarded the island, and otherwise engaged in patrol, escort, and radar picket duties around Saipan. On 23 February, she sailed from Saipan to escort an ammunition ship to newly invaded Iwo Jima, returning to Guam 28 February with a hospital ship. She returned to Iwo Jima in mid-March for radar picket and air-sea rescue duty. With periods at Guam and Saipan for replenishment and repairs, she continued on this duty through most of the remainder of the war.

Cassin endured a typhoon on 6 June 1945, losing one of her men (and a motor whaleboat) overboard. On 20 July, she bombarded Kita-Iwō-jima, and on 7 August, she boarded and searched a Japanese hospital ship to ensure compliance with international law. Since there were no violations, she allowed the ship to proceed on its way. With the war over, Cassin continued air-sea rescue off Iwo Jima, guarding the air evacuation of released prisoners of war from Japan.

== Fate ==
She returned to Norfolk, Virginia, 1 November 1945, and was decommissioned there 17 December 1945. Cassin was sold for scrap on 25 November 1947. The Ensign that was flying on the ship during the attack on Pearl Harbor is currently displayed in the Jerry Falwell Library on the campus of Liberty University. Her ship's bell resides at the Office of Naval Intelligence in Suitland, MD.

== Awards ==
Cassin received six battle stars for World War II service.
