= USS Tarbell =

Wickes-class destroyer

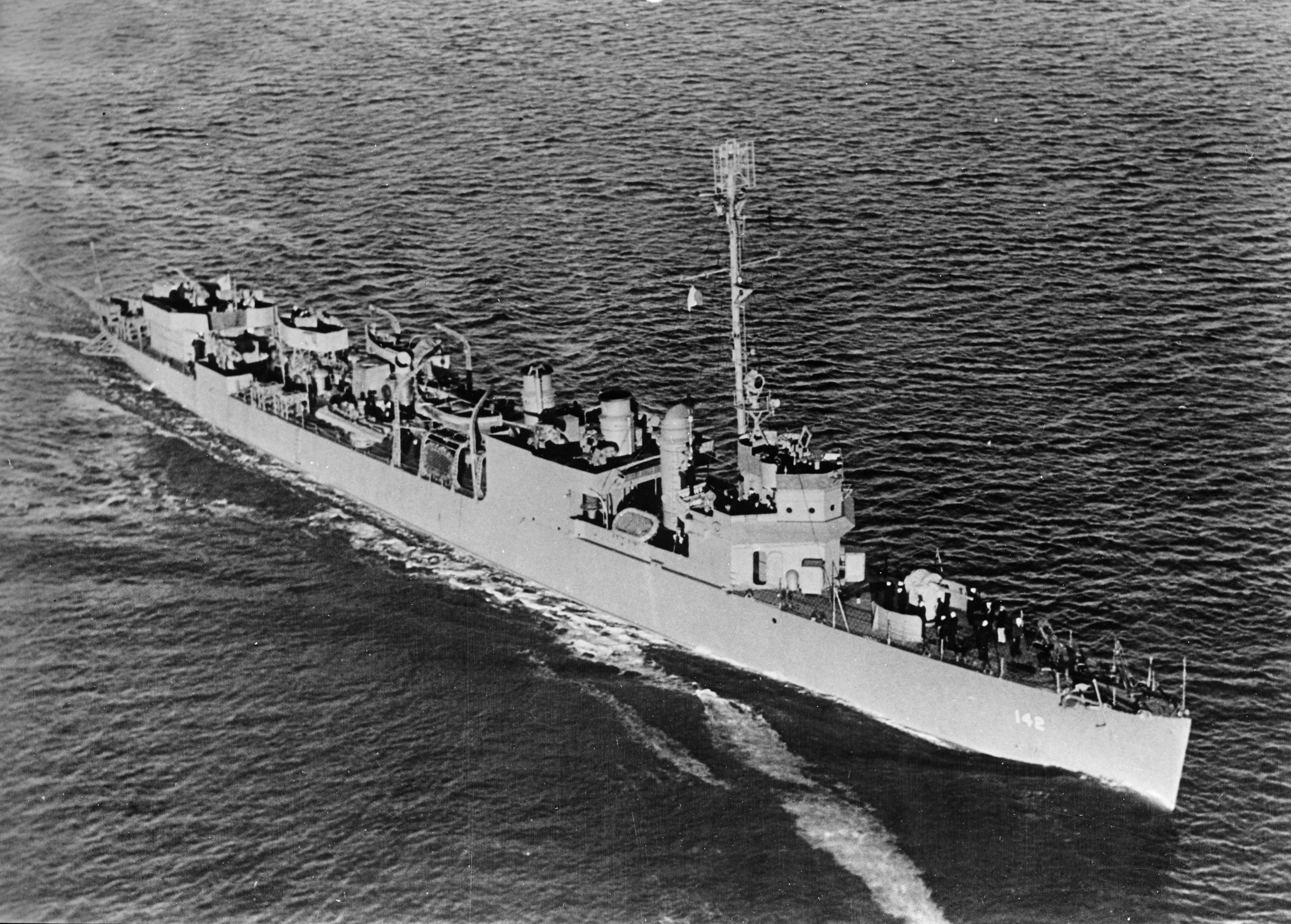
- USS Tarbell underway in Charleston harbor on 17 December 1942

History

United States
- Name: Tarbell
- Namesake: Joseph Tarbell
- Builder: William Cramp & Sons, Philadelphia
- Yard number: 457
- Laid down: 31 December 1917
- Launched: 28 May 1918
- Commissioned: 27 November 1918
- Decommissioned: 8 June 1922
- Identification: DD-142
- Recommissioned: 29 May 1930
- Decommissioned: 1936
- Recommissioned: 4 October 1939
- Decommissioned: 20 July 1945
- Stricken: 13 August 1945
- Fate: Sold for scrapping 30 November 1945

General characteristics
- Class & type: Wickes-class destroyer
- Displacement: 1,090 tons
- Length: 314 ft 4 1/2 in (95.8 m)
- Beam: 30 ft 11 1/4 in (9.4 m)
- Draft: 9 ft 10 1/4 in (3.0 m)
- Speed: 35 knots (65 km/h)
- Complement: 122 officers and enlisted
- Armament: 4 × 4 in (102 mm)/50 guns; 2 × 3 in (76 mm)/23 guns; 12 × 21 in (533 mm) torpedo tubes

USS Tarbell (DD–142) was a Wickes-class destroyer in the United States Navy during World War I. She was the first ship named for Captain Joseph Tarbell.

Tarbell was laid down on 31 December 1917 at Philadelphia by William Cramp & Sons Ship & Engine Building Company. The ship was launched on 28 May 1918, sponsored by Miss Virgie Tarbell, and commissioned on 27 November 1918, Commander Halsey Powell in command.

== Service history ==
Tarbell operated along the eastern seaboard until September 1919, when she was reassigned to the Pacific Fleet. Based at San Francisco, she served with Destroyer Division 15, of Destroyer Flotilla 5 and Destroyer Squadron 4, until late January 1920 when she joined Division 13 of the same flotilla and squadron. In February, her home yard was changed to Cavite in the Philippines, and in March, the destroyer joined the Asiatic Fleet. Tarbell served on the Asiatic Station until mid-1921, when she returned to the Pacific Fleet with her home yard at Puget Sound. She operated with the Pacific Fleet until she was decommissioned on 8 June 1922 and berthed at San Diego, California.

On 29 May 1930, Tarbell was recommissioned and assigned to Destroyer Division 11, Destroyer Squadron 10, Destroyer Squadrons, Battle Fleet. Her home port was San Diego until January 1931, when it was changed to Charleston, South Carolina. However, she remained assigned to the same administrative organization until March, when she was reassigned to Destroyer Division 3 of the Scouting Force. Sometime between July and October 1934, the destroyer changed home ports back to San Diego, but remained a part of the Scouting Force Destroyers. Late in 1936, Tarbell returned to the east coast to prepare for her second decommissioning, this time at Philadelphia.

She remained there until after war broke out in Europe in September 1939. To keep the war out of the Americas, President Franklin D. Roosevelt issued two Neutrality Acts on 5 September and ordered the Navy to form a Neutrality Patrol. A month later, on 4 October 1939, Tarbell was placed back in commission at Philadelphia. She operated in the Atlantic with the Neutrality Patrol for over two years before the Japanese attack on Pearl Harbor jolted the United States into the war.

=== World War II ===
Tarbell's duties remained much the same after the United States entered the conflict. The destroyer continued to escort convoys and perform antisubmarine work in the northern Atlantic. She shuttled merchant ships back and forth across the ocean and operated out of the east coast ports on rescue missions to pick up survivors of torpedoed ships.

One such rescue mission occurred on 26 March 1942. A Socony tanker, Dixie Arrow, was torpedoed off Cape Hatteras, North Carolina, and Tarbell's lookouts sighted her distress flares a little before 0900. The destroyer rang up full speed; and, one-half hour later, she arrived at the scene of the attack. She dropped a depth charge barrage to drive off any U-boats lurking in the vicinity and then picked up 22 survivors. After a futile search for the enemy submarine, she disembarked the survivors at Morehead City, North Carolina.

In May 1942, the destroyer began helping in the surveillance of Vichy French warships in the Caribbean Sea. To assure that those French ships were not turned over to the Germans and that, in accordance with the Panama Declaration, there be no transfer of European possessions in America to any non-American power, she was assigned a patrol area around Pointe-à-Pitre, Grand Terre Island, Guadeloupe, and her specific charge was the old training cruiser Jeanne D'Arc.

Her rescue missions continued along with observation missions. On 16 May, she rescued 24 members of the crew of Lammont Dupont, torpedoed four days out of New York. On the evening of 25 May, when word reached her at San Juan, Puerto Rico of a U-boat attack on the destroyer Blakeley, Tarbell got underway so rapidly that two of her officers and 13 crewmen were left behind in Puerto Rico. The following day, she picked up eight wounded Blakeley crewmen at Martinique, then participated in the search for the U-boat until the afternoon of 27 May. On 2 June, Tarbell rescued 19 survivors of Alegrete. Two days later, the destroyer sighted survivors of the sinking of M.F Elliot and brought them aboard, running her tally up to 31 men rescued on that mission.

Following additional escort duty in the Caribbean and in the Gulf of Mexico, Tarbell began screening transatlantic convoys in mid-May 1943. Her first voyage was in the escort of convoy UGS-9 which was augmented by the latest development in antisubmarine warfare (ASW)—an escort carrier. The convoy reached Casablanca safely on 15 June. Tarbell returned to the United States at New York, underwent repairs, and conducted training before joining another Casablanca-bound convoy in August. Upon her return to New York, the destroyer resumed local escort work until 22 October, when she departed New York in company with Croatan, Lea, and Upshur to cover the passage of another convoy. The unit steamed via Bermuda, where it was joined by Albemarle, and arrived at Casablanca on 3 November. Following a short voyage to Gibraltar, Tarbell headed back across the Atlantic on 10 November. The return convoy entered New York harbor on 21 November.

The following month brought an availability, refresher training, and time spent in training prospective crews for destroyer-type warships. On 26 December, she departed Norfolk in company with Mission Bay and Destroyer Division 61 to cover convoy UGS-28 to North Africa, from there operating as a hunter/ killer group in the vicinity of the Azores. On 31 December, Lea was severely damaged in a collision, and Tarbell took her in tow for Bermuda. On 3 January 1944, the destroyer was relieved of her towing duties by Cherokee and Twiggs and caught up with the convoy at Horta in the Azores on the 7th.

After hunting submarines along the convoy routes, Tarbell's group reached Norfolk, on 7 February, and the destroyer set out for a 10-day availability at Boston. Following that, she was assigned to the Air Force, Atlantic Fleet (AirLant) for air crew training operations off Provincetown, Massachusetts. Relieved of that duty in April, she operated for a time in the screen of Ranger and Kasaan Bay. From then until July 1945, she alternated between carrier escort duty and target ship duty with AirLant. On 20 July 1945, Tarbell was placed out of commission at Philadelphia. Her name was struck from the Navy List on 13 August 1945, and she was sold for scrapping on 30 November 1945 to the Boston Metal Salvage Company, Baltimore, Maryland.

As of 2012, no other ship in the United States Navy has borne this name.

== Convoys escorted ==
Convoy	Escort Group	Dates	Notes
HX 156		24 Oct-1 Nov 1941	from Newfoundland to Iceland prior to US declaration of war
ON 34		12-21 Nov 1941	from Iceland to Newfoundland prior to US declaration of war
HX 163		5-15 Dec 1941	from Newfoundland to Iceland; war declared while escorting convoy
ON 47		22-23 Dec 1941	from Iceland to Newfoundland
HX 170		16-22 Jan 1942	from Newfoundland to Iceland
ON 61		1-10 Feb 1942	from Iceland to Newfoundland
