= John Cassin (naval officer) =

War of 1812 American commodore

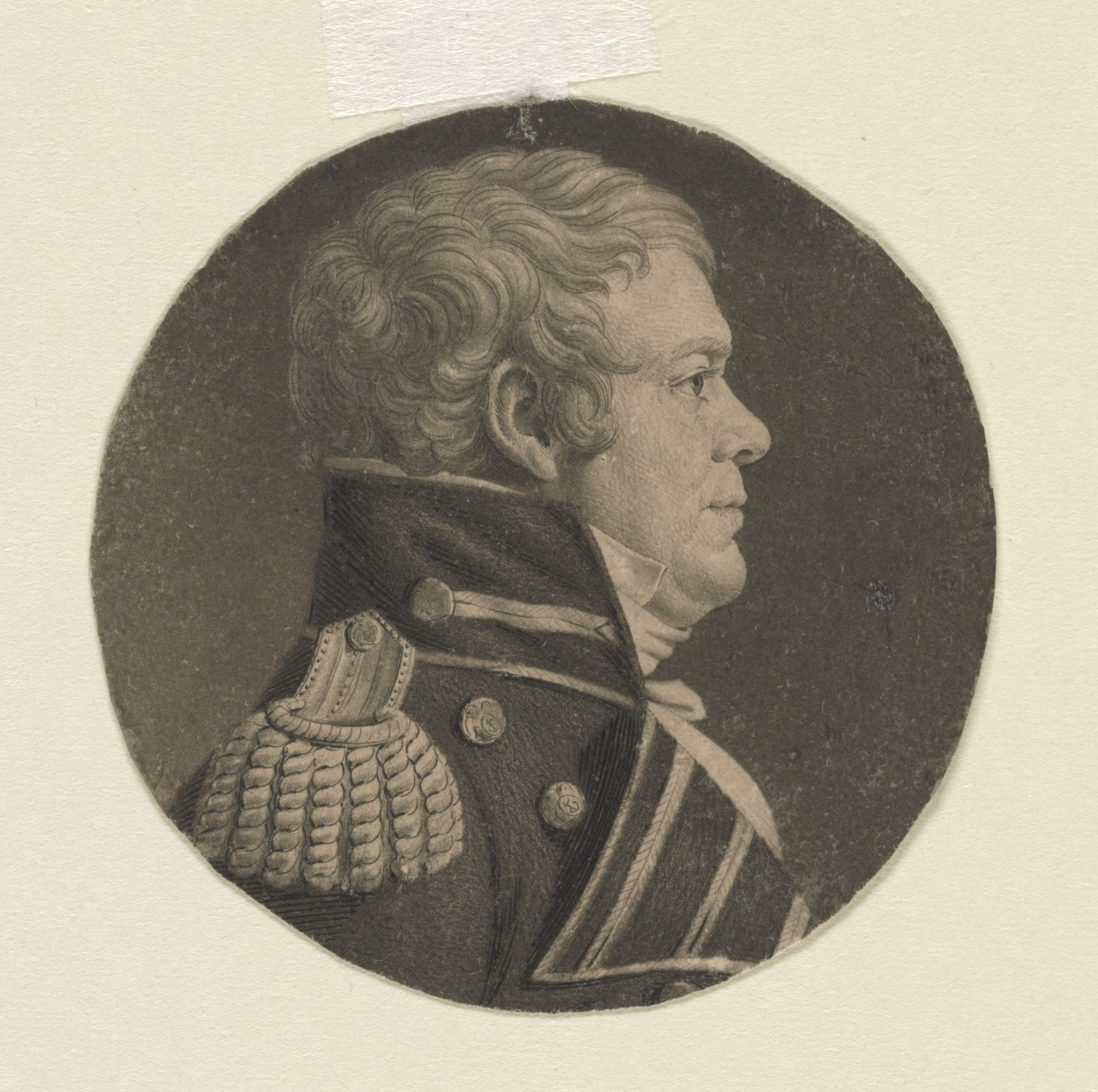
- Commodore John Cassin
- Born: July 16, 1760; Philadelphia, Pennsylvania, British America
- Died: March 23, 1822; Charleston, South Carolina, US
- Spouse: Ann Wilcox
- Military career
- Allegiance: United States
- Branch: United States Army; United States Navy
- Service years: 1777–1822
- Rank: Commodore
- Commands: Norfolk Naval Shipyard
- Conflicts: American Revolutionary War: Battle of Trenton; War of 1812

Commodore John Cassin (July 16, 1760 – March 24, 1822) was a United States Navy officer, who led the vital defense of Gosport Navy Yard during the War of 1812 and served as its Commandant.

== Early life ==
Cassin, born in Philadelphia, Pennsylvania, on July 16, 1760, was the son of Joseph Cassin, who was born in Dublin, Ireland, and came to Philadelphia in 1725. Ref: Daughters of the American Revolution, DAR, Application for Membership No. 522718.

== Military service ==
During the American Revolutionary War, Cassin served in the Army and took part in the Battle of Trenton.

In 1803, Cassin was assigned as second officer at the Washington Navy Yard.

During the War of 1812 he led the United States Navy in the Delaware for the defense of Philadelphia. He also commanded the Norfolk Naval Shipyard from 10 August 1812 until 1 June 1821. After that he was the commanding officer of the Southern Naval station, Charleston, South Carolina.

== Family ==
In the early 1780s Cassin married Ann Wilcox (1754–1821) of Philadelphia. They had four children: Elizabeth Ann Cassin (married Captain Joseph Tarbell), Joseph Cassin (1784–1821), Stephen Cassin, and John Cassin (b.1791, died young). Joseph and Stephen were Navy officers.

== Death ==
He died on March 24, 1822, in Charleston, South Carolina.
