= Tarball =

Tarball may refer to:

- Tarball (computing), a tar archive file
- Tarball (oil), a blob of semi-solid oil found on or near the ocean
