= SM U-61 =

History

German Empire
- Name: U-61
- Ordered: 6 October 1914
- Builder: AG Weser, Bremen
- Yard number: 216
- Laid down: 22 June 1915
- Launched: 22 July 1916
- Commissioned: 2 December 1916
- Fate: Missing after 23 March 1918

General characteristics
- Class & type: Type U 57 submarine
- Displacement: 768 t (756 long tons) surfaced; 956 t (941 long tons) submerged
- Length: 67.00 m (219 ft 10 in) (o/a); 54.02 m (177 ft 3 in) (pressure hull)
- Beam: 6.32 m (20 ft 9 in) (oa); 4.05 m (13 ft 3 in) (pressure hull)
- Height: 8.05 m (26 ft 5 in)
- Draught: 3.79 m (12 ft 5 in)
- Installed power: 2 × 2,400 PS (1,765 kW; 2,367 shp) surfaced; 2 × 1,200 PS (883 kW; 1,184 shp) submerged
- Propulsion: 2 shafts
- Speed: 16.5 knots (30.6 km/h; 19.0 mph) surfaced; 8.4 knots (15.6 km/h; 9.7 mph) submerged
- Range: 11,400 nmi (21,100 km; 13,100 mi) at 8 knots (15 km/h; 9.2 mph) surfaced; 49 nmi (91 km; 56 mi) at 5 knots (9.3 km/h; 5.8 mph) submerged
- Test depth: 50 m (164 ft 1 in)
- Complement: 36
- Armament: 4 × 50 cm (19.7 in) torpedo tubes (two bow, two stern); 7 torpedoes; 1 × 10.5 cm (4.1 in) SK L/45 deck gun

Service record
- Part of: II Flotilla; 15 February 1917 – 26 March 1918
- Commanders: Kptlt. Victor Dieckmann; 2 December 1916 – 26 March 1918
- Operations: 9 patrols
- Victories: 32 merchant ships sunk (83,291 GRT); 1 auxiliary warship sunk (1,273 GRT); 6 merchant ships damaged (21,054 GRT); 1 warship damaged (1,020 tons); 2 auxiliary warships damaged (3,424 GRT)

SM U-61 was a German Type U 57 U-boat commissioned and deployed to operate off the coast of the British Isles and attack coastal shipping as part of the U-boat Campaign during World War I.

In a 15-month career spanning nine war patrols, U-61 plagued allied shipping in the Atlantic Ocean during the German war on Allied trade (Handelskrieg). She sank 33 Allied ships, totalling 84,564 gross register tons (GRT). She also damaged six merchant ships of 21,054 GRT, two auxiliary warships of 3,424 GRT and one warship of 1,020 tons (the US Navy destroyer USS Cassin before fleeing the fight). She went missing some time after March 23, 1918.

== Previously recorded fate ==
U-61 was originally thought to have been sunk in a depth charge attack by PC51 on 26 March 1918. This attack was actually against UC-56, which was able to continue on patrol despite the attack.

== Summary of raiding history ==
Date	Name	Nationality	Tonnage (Note: Merchant ship tonnages are in gross register tons. Military vessels are listed by tons displacement.)	Fate
2 March 1917	Edvard Grieg	Norway	989	Sunk
3 March 1917	Rosborg	Denmark	1,877	Sunk
9 March 1917	Spartan (ex-Earl of Dunmore)	Norway	2,287	Sunk
10 March 1917	Angola	Portugal	4,297	Sunk
13 March 1917	Luciline	United Kingdom	3,765	Damaged
13 March 1917	Northwaite	United Kingdom	3,626	Sunk
13 March 1917	HMS Warner	Royal Navy	1,273	Sunk
17 April 1917	Aburi	United Kingdom	3,730	Sunk
18 April 1917	Castilian	United Kingdom	1,923	Sunk
21 April 1917	Skjold	Norway	1,592	Sunk
21 April 1917	Telena	United Kingdom	4,778	Sunk
23 April 1917	Calluna	Denmark	1,405	Sunk
23 April 1917	Lena	United Kingdom	2,463	Sunk
24 April 1917	Metropolis	Norway	1,811	Sunk
24 April 1917	Thirlby	United Kingdom	2,009	Damaged
30 April 1917	Jarstein	Norway	198	Sunk
9 June 1917	Ada	Sweden	2,370	Sunk
9 June 1917	Dana	Denmark	1,590	Sunk
10 June 1917	Betty	Russia	2,683	Sunk
10 June 1917	Ribera	United Kingdom	3,511	Sunk
14 June 1917	Widwud	Russia	299	Damaged
16 June 1917	Fallodon	United Kingdom	3,012	Damaged
17 June 1917	Raloo	United Kingdom	1,012	Sunk
19 June 1917	Batoum	United Kingdom	4,054	Sunk
20 June 1917	Nitonian	United Kingdom	6,381	Damaged
28 July 1917	Comanchee	United Kingdom	5,588	Damaged
2 August 1917	Libia	France	2,416	Sunk
4 August 1917	Countess Of Mar	United Kingdom	2,234	Sunk
5 August 1917	Sauternes	France	902	Sunk
5 August 1917	Campo Libre	Spain	50	Sunk
6 August 1917	Campana	United States	3,675	Sunk
6 August 1917	Jeanne Et Genevieve	French Navy	695	Damaged
7 August 1917	Trento	Italy	3,276	Sunk
29 September 1917	Elmsgarth	United Kingdom	3,503	Sunk
11 October 1917	Rhodesia	United Kingdom	4,313	Sunk
16 October 1917	USS Cassin	United States Navy	1,020	Damaged
27 December 1917	USS Santee	United States Navy	2,729	Damaged
3 January 1918	Birchwood	United Kingdom	2,756	Sunk
5 January 1918	Rose Marie	United Kingdom	2,220	Sunk
6 January 1918	Halberdier	United Kingdom	1,049	Sunk
6 January 1918	Spenser	United Kingdom	4,186	Sunk
23 March 1918	Etonian	United Kingdom	6,515	Sunk

== Bibliography ==
- Gröner, Erich; Jung, Dieter; Maass, Martin (1991). U-boats and Mine Warfare Vessels. German Warships 1815–1945. Vol. 2. Translated by Thomas, Keith; Magowan, Rachel. London: Conway Maritime Press. ISBN 0-85177-593-4.
