= USS Cassin (DD-43) =

Cassin-class destroyer

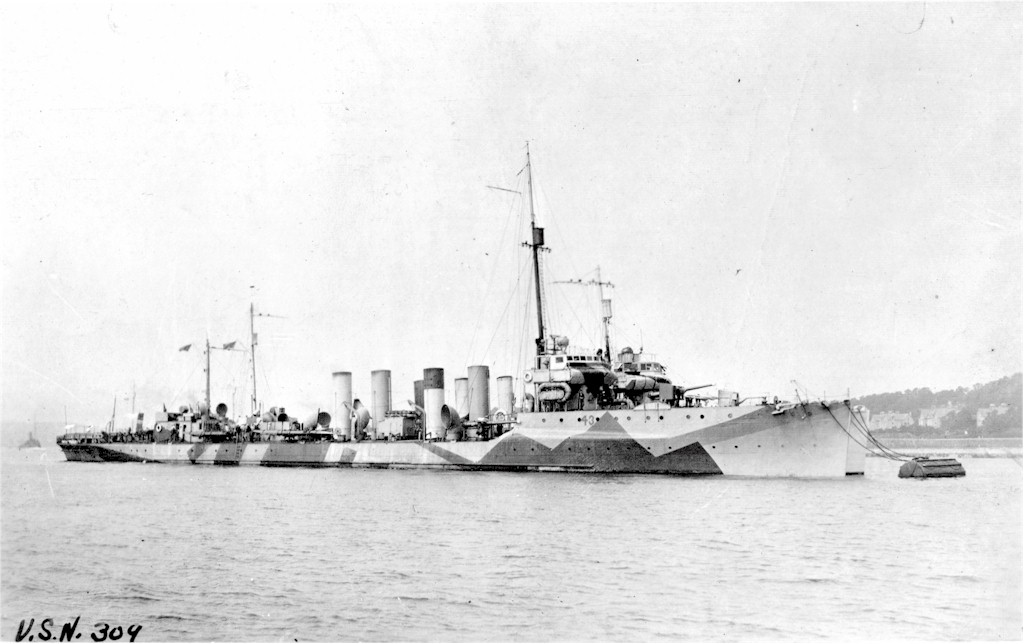
- USS Cassin (DD-43) moored alongside another U.S. Navy destroyer, at Queenstown, Ireland, circa 1918. She is painted in "Dazzle" type camouflage.

History

United States
- Name: Cassin
- Namesake: Captain Stephen Cassin (1783-1857), awarded Congressional Gold Medal
- Builder: Bath Iron Works, Bath, Maine
- Cost: $780,171.28
- Laid down: 1 May 1912
- Launched: 20 May 1913
- Sponsored by: Miss H. C. Carusi
- Commissioned: 9 August 1913
- Decommissioned: 7 June 1922
- Stricken: 5 July 1934
- Identification: Hull symbol:DD-43; Code letters:NIK
- Fate: transferred to the United States Coast Guard, 28 April 1924; sold 22 August 1934, broken up for scrap
- Notes: Cassin lost her name to new construction 1 November 1933

United States
- Name: Cassin
- Acquired: 28 April 1924
- Commissioned: 30 August 1924
- Decommissioned: 5 June 1933
- Identification: Hull symbol:CG-1
- Fate: transferred back to the United States Navy, 30 June 1933

General characteristics
- Class & type: Cassin-class destroyer
- Displacement: 1,020 long tons (1,040 t)
- Length: 305 ft 3 in (93.04 m)
- Beam: 31 ft 2 in (9.50 m)
- Draft: 9 ft 3 in (2.82 m) (mean)
- Installed power: oil fired boilers; 16,000 ihp (12,000 kW)
- Propulsion: 2 × Direct Drive Turbines With Triple Expansion Cruising Engines; 2 × shafts
- Speed: 29.5 kn (33.9 mph; 54.6 km/h); 30.14 kn (34.68 mph; 55.82 km/h) (Speed on Trial)
- Complement: 5 officers 96 enlisted; 6 officers, 82 enlisted (in USCG service)
- Armament: USN: 4 × 4 in (100 mm)/50 caliber guns; 8 × 18 inch (450 mm) torpedo tubes (4 × 2); USCG: 3 × 4 in (100 mm)/50 cal guns; 1 × 1-pdr

The first USS Cassin (DD-43) was the lead ship of Cassin-class destroyers in the United States Navy during World War I. She was later transferred to the United States Coast Guard, where she was designated CG-1. She was named for Stephen Cassin.

== Construction ==
Cassin's keel was laid down on 1 May 1912, by Bath Iron Works, Bath, Maine, who later launched her on 20 May 1913. She was sponsored by nine year old Miss Helen Cassin Carusi (later known as Helen Lombard, Stephen Cassin's great granddaughter; who would later sponsor the second USS Cassin in 1935. Commissioned on 9 August 1913 with Lieutenant Commander Harris Laning in command, she reported to the Atlantic Torpedo Flotilla.

== Pre-World War I ==
From her arrival at Key West, Florida, from 5 December 1913 – 16 June 1914, Cassin sailed with the 6th Division in the Caribbean and Gulf of Mexico in fleet maneuvers and exercises. On 19 May 1914, she sailed to the rescue of SS Atlantis, wrecked north of Tampico, Mexico. Taking the stricken ship's passengers on board, she landed them at Tampico. After overhaul, Cassin operated along the east coast from 21 October 1914 to 27 January 1915, when she returned to the Caribbean for winter maneuvers.

== World War I ==
Operations along the east coast on Neutrality patrol and drills and surveillance patrol in the Caribbean were Cassin's employment until April 1917, when she was immediately prepared for overseas deployment. She arrived at Queenstown, Ireland on 17 May, and began operations which called for her to rendezvous with American troop convoys at sea and escort them to ports in England and France. On 15 October, she sighted the German submarine U-61 about 20 nmi (23 mi; 37 km) south of Mine Head Lighthouse, Monagoush, County Waterford, Ireland, and pursued her. At 13:30, Cassin was struck on her port stern by a torpedo.

According to the report issued by the Secretary of the Navy, the torpedo would have missed the Cassin entirely, except it breached the surface of the water on two occasions and turned to the left each time. The torpedo struck above the water line, and ignited several depth charges.

Gunner's Mate First Class Osmond Ingram was killed. When he saw the approaching torpedo, he ran to where the depth charges were and began throwing them overboard. He was killed in the explosion. For his actions, he received a posthumous Medal of Honor. Nine other men received minor wounds, but miraculously, though there were more than 20 men sleeping in compartments that were completely destroyed by the torpedo, no one else was killed. In fact, Fireman First Class F. W. Kruse is reported to have wandered out of his living compartment while completely unconscious after having had 84 in (2,100 mm) of frame blown away immediately adjacent to his bunk. One other casualty is attributed to the action, in that Dr. Dudley Walton Queen was seized with cerebrospinal meningitis caused by exposure to the elements, and died four days later on 19 October.

Cassin, her rudder blown off and stern extensively damaged, began to circle. This did not prevent her, however, from firing four rounds at the submarine when she spotted its conning tower at 1430. The submarine, thus discouraged from further attack, submerged and was not contacted again. Through the night, Cassin was guarded by the American destroyer Porter and the British sloop HMS Jessamine and HMS Tamarisk, a disguised sloop under Captain Ronald Niel Stuart. In the morning, HMS Snowdrop took Cassin in tow for Queenstown. After repairs there and at Newport, England, Cassin returned to escort duty on 2 July 1918.

== Inter-war period ==
Cassin's war service was honored on 12–13 December, when she was chosen as one of the escorts for George Washington, carrying President Woodrow Wilson into Brest, France, for his attendance at the Versailles Peace Conference. Cassin returned to Boston, Massachusetts, on 3 January 1919.

After winter maneuvers in the Caribbean, Cassin cleared New York City on 1 May for the Azores, where she took station guarding the route of the Navy's historic transatlantic NC-4 flight. She returned to Boston, Massachusetts, for repairs, then sailed on to Philadelphia, Pennsylvania, where she was placed in reserve on 18 June for more extensive repairs. Reactivated at Charleston, South Carolina, on 14 February 1921, Cassin joined Destroyer Flotilla 5 for operations along the New England coast until 11 October, when she returned to Charleston. Returning to Philadelphia on 29 March 1922, she was decommissioned there on 7 June.

Transferred to the Treasury Department on 28 April 1924 for service in Coast Guard. Redesignated CG-1 on 7 June 1924, she was commissioned on 30 August and arrived in Bath, Maine for repairs on 11 September. Repairs were completed on 15 October 1924 and she was homeported in New London, Connecticut, as part of the Rum Patrol. On 1 Jun 1930, Cassin was transferred to Division 3, Destroyer Force, serving as the flagship. On 27 May 1933, she arrived at Philadelphia Navy Yard, where she was decommissioned on 5 June 1933.

== Fate ==
Cassin was returned to naval custody on 30 June 1933; lost her name on 1 November 1933; struck off on 5 July 1934; and sold for scrap on 22 August 1934.

The ship's bell is mounted outside the Harrison County Courthouse, in Cynthiana, Kentucky. An accompanying stone marker recognizes both the first and second USS Cassin and is dedicated to those killed during the attack on Pearl Harbor on 7 December 1941.
