= Stephen Cassin =

United States Navy officer

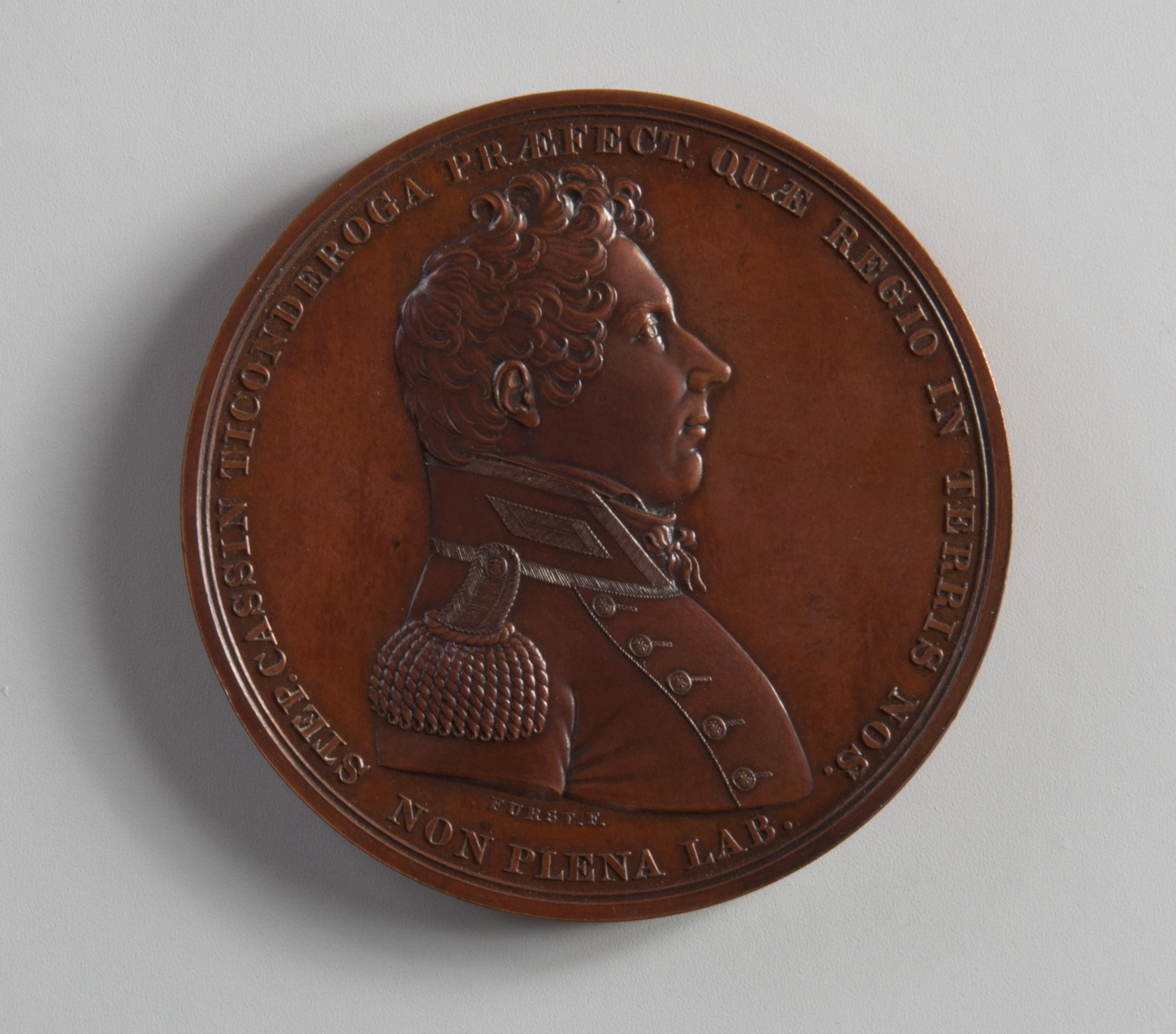
Bust of Lieutenant Stephen Cassin.

Stephen Cassin (16 February 1783 – 29 August 1857) was an officer in the United States Navy during the First Barbary War and the War of 1812.

== Early life and military career ==
Born in Philadelphia, the son of naval officer John Cassin, Cassin entered the United States Navy as a midshipman in 1800. He was promoted to lieutenant, having distinguished himself in the war with Tripoli during the Second Barbary War on the USS Peacock. He also served in the West Indies Squadron against piracy.

=== War of 1812 and Congressional Gold Medal ===
In the War of 1812, he was promoted to the rank of post-captain and commanded the USS Ticonderoga in the Battle of Lake Champlain and was awarded a gold medal by the United States Congress in commemoration of the victory.

Text of Congressional Gold Medal resolution:

Resolved, That the President of the United States be requested to cause gold medals to be struck, emblematical of the action between the two squadrons, and to present them to Captain Macdonough and Captain Robert Henley, and also to Lieutenant Stephen Cassin, in such manner as may be most honorable to them; and that the President be further requested to present a silver medal, with suitable emblems and devices, to each of the commissioned officers of the navy and army serving on board, and a sword to each of the midshipmen and sailing masters, who so nobly distinguished themselves in that memorable conflict.

At the close of the war, Cassin commanded the Newport, Rhode Island Station, and after that the Washington Navy Yard for five years.

== Family ==
Cassin was married to Margaretta Abernethy and had thirteen children. His son John was a Naval officer too. His granddaughter was author Helen Lombard.

== Death and legacy ==
Captain Cassin died in Washington, D.C. He was buried in Washington, and reinterred in 1907 in Arlington National Cemetery.

Two ships have been named USS Cassin for him, both of which his granddaughter helped launch.
