= List of United States Navy vice admirals on active duty before 1960 =

The grade of vice admiral (or three-star admiral) is ordinarily the second-highest in the peacetime United States Navy, ranking above rear admiral and below admiral.

The grade of vice admiral was originally created to honor particularly successful Union Navy flag officers of the American Civil War. Between World War I and World War II, dozens of officers cycled through three designated vice admiral billets in the United States Fleet, holding the rank temporarily before reverting to their permanent grade of rear admiral upon relinquishing command. Dozens of temporary vice admirals were appointed during World War II alone, and by January 1, 1960, the Navy register listed 28 line officers as vice admirals on the active list in the peacetime Navy.

Many rear admirals received honorary tombstone promotions to vice admiral when they retired, having been specially commended for performance of duty in actual combat before the end of World War II, but only a handful were ever recalled to active duty in that grade. Tombstone promotions were abolished effective November 1, 1959.

== Taxonomy ==
- A permanent vice admiral was an officer who was confirmed by the Senate to hold the permanent grade of vice admiral, which the officer retained regardless of assignment. Appointments to this permanent grade on the active list were only authorized between 1866 and 1873, and all subsequent appointments were on the retired list.
- A designated vice admiral was an officer who was designated by the President to hold the temporary rank of vice admiral while serving in a billet carrying that ex officio rank, and who reverted to a lower permanent grade upon vacating that billet. From 1915 to 1947, such designations were at the sole discretion of the President, and did not require Senate confirmation, unlike the temporary vice admirals of World War II and later. The category was eliminated by the Officer Personnel Act of 1947, which required all vice admiral appointments to be confirmed by the Senate.
- A temporary vice admiral was an officer who was confirmed by the Senate to hold the temporary grade of vice admiral under some condition, such as while serving in a particular job or for the duration of the World War II national emergency, reverting to a lower permanent grade when the condition was over.
- A civil engineer/medical director/naval constructor with rank of vice admiral was an officer in the Civil Engineer Corps/Medical Corps/Construction Corps with the title of civil engineer/medical director/naval constructor and the rank of vice admiral, prior to 1947. Each staff corps originally had its own hierarchy of titles to describe relative seniority within the corps. Staff corps titles were abolished by the Officer Personnel Act of 1947, and all officers thereafter had the same title as their rank.
- A tombstone vice admiral was a rear admiral who retired with the rank but not the pay of the next higher grade as a reward for being specially commended for the performance of duty in actual combat before the end of World War II. Most such officers never served as vice admirals while on active duty. Tombstone promotions were abolished in 1959.

== List of U.S. Navy vice admirals on active duty before 1960 ==
This is a complete list of officers who held the rank of vice admiral while on active duty in the United States Navy before January 1, 1960, including officers who received a tombstone promotion to vice admiral if they were recalled to active duty in that rank.

Entries are indexed by the numerical order in which each officer became a vice admiral on the active list, or by an asterisk (*) if the officer served in that rank only after transferring to the retired list. Each entry lists the officer's name, date appointed, date the officer vacated the active-duty rank, number of years of service as vice admiral (Yrs), positions held as vice admiral, and other biographical notes.

Italics denote active duty as vice admiral while on the retired list.

The list is sortable by active-duty appointment order, last name, date appointed, date vacated, and number of years on active duty as vice admiral.

	Name	Photo	Date appointed	Date vacated	Yrs	Position	Notes
1	David G. Farragut		21 Dec 1864	24 Jul 1866	2	Commander, West Gulf Blockading Squadron, 1862–1865.; Commander, Naval Forces, James River, 1865.; President, Board of Visitors, U.S. Naval Academy, 1865–1866.	(1801–1870) Promoted to admiral, 25 Jul 1866. Brother-by-adoption of Navy admiral David D. Porter Jr.
2	David D. Porter		25 Jul 1866	14 Aug 1870	4	Superintendent, U.S. Naval Academy, 1865–1869.; Special duty, Navy Department, 1869–1870.	(1813–1891) Promoted to admiral, 15 Aug 1870. Brother-by-adoption of Navy admiral David G. Farragut.
3	Stephen C. Rowan		15 Aug 1870	26 Feb 1889	19	President, Board of Visitors, U.S. Naval Academy, 1871.; Port Admiral, New York City/Commandant, New York Navy Yard, 1872–1876.; Port Admiral, New York City, 1876–1877.; President, Board of Examiners, 1877–1880.; Member, Board of Visitors, U.S. Naval Academy, 1880–1881.; Governor, Philadelphia Naval Asylum, 1881–1882.; Superintendent, U.S. Naval Observatory, 1882–1883.; Chairman, Lighthouse Board, 1883–1889.	(1808–1890)
4	Henry T. Mayo		10 Jun 1915	18 Jun 1916	1	Second in command, Atlantic Fleet, 1915–1916.	(1857–1937) Promoted to admiral, 19 Jun 1916. Governor, U.S. Naval Home, 1924–1928.
5	DeWitt Coffman		19 Jun 1916	31 Aug 1918	2	Second in command, Atlantic Fleet, 1916–1918.	(1876–1932)
6	William S. Sims		22 May 1917	3 Dec 1918	2	Commander, U.S. Destroyers Operating from British Bases, 1917.; Commander, U.S. Naval Forces Operating in European Waters, 1917–1919.	(1858–1936) Promoted to admiral, 4 Dec 1918. President, Naval War College, 1917; 1919–1922. Awarded Pulitzer Prize for History, 1921.
7	Albert W. Grant		20 Aug 1917	31 Mar 1919	2	Commander, Battleship Force 1, Atlantic Fleet, 1917–1919.	(1856–1930)
8	Henry B. Wilson Jr.		25 Sep 1918	30 Jun 1919	1	Commander, Battleship Force 2, Atlantic Fleet, 1918–1919.	(1861–1954) Promoted to admiral, 30 Jun 1919. Superintendent, U.S. Naval Academy, 1921–1925. Father-in-law of U.S. Secretary of War Patrick J. Hurley.
9	Albert Gleaves		4 Dec 1918	31 Aug 1919	1	Commander, Cruiser and Transport Force, Atlantic Fleet, 1918–1919.	(1858–1937) Promoted to admiral, 1 Sep 1919. Governor, U.S. Naval Home, 1928–1931.
10	William L. Rodgers		28 Jun 1919	30 Jan 1920	1	Commander in Chief, Asiatic Fleet, 1918–1919.; Commander, Division 1, Asiatic Fleet, 1919–1920.	(1860–1944) Son of Navy rear admiral John Rodgers; grandson of Navy commodore John Rodgers.
11	Clarence S. Williams		1 Jul 1919	5 Jul 1921	2	Commander, Battleship Force 4, Pacific Fleet, 1919–1921.	(1863–1951) Promoted to admiral, 14 Oct 1925. President, Naval War College, 1922–1925.
12	Hilary P. Jones		14 Jul 1919	29 Jun 1921	2	Commander, Battleship Force 2, Atlantic Fleet, 1919–1921.	(1865–1939) Promoted to admiral, 30 Jun 1921.
13	Harry S. Knapp		3 Feb 1920	27 Jun 1920	0	Commander, U.S. Naval Forces in European Waters, 1920.	(1856–1928)
14	Harry M. P. Huse		27 Jun 1920	15 Jan 1921	1	Commander, U.S. Naval Forces in European Waters, 1920–1921.	(1858–1942) Awarded Medal of Honor, 1914.
15	Albert P. Niblack		15 Jan 1921	19 Jun 1922	1	Commander, U.S. Naval Forces in European Waters, 1921–1922.	(1859–1929) Director of Naval Intelligence, 1919–1920; Director, International Hydrographic Bureau, 1927–1929.
16	John D. McDonald		1 Jul 1921	20 Jun 1923	2	Commander, Battleship Force 2, Atlantic Fleet, 1921–1922.; Commander, Scouting Fleet, 1922–1923.	(1862–1952)
17	William R. Shoemaker		8 Jul 1921	20 Jun 1923	2	Commander, Battleship Force 4, Pacific Fleet, 1921–1922.; Commander, Battleship Divisions, Battle Fleet, 1922–1923.	(1863–1938)
18	Edwin A. Anderson		19 Jun 1922	22 Jul 1922	0	Commander, U.S. Naval Forces in European Waters, 1922.	(1860–1933) Promoted to admiral, 28 Aug 1922. Awarded Medal of Honor, 1914.
19	Andrew T. Long		7 Aug 1922	21 Jun 1923	1	Commander, U.S. Naval Forces in Europe, 1922–1923.	(1866–1946) Director, International Hydrographic Bureau, 1930–1937.
20	Henry A. Wiley		20 Jun 1923	5 Oct 1925	2	Commander, Battleship Divisions, Battle Fleet, 1923–1925.	(1867–1943) Promoted to admiral, 8 Sep 1927. Chairman/Commissioner, U.S. Maritime Commission, 1936–1940.
21	Newton A. McCully		20 Jun 1923	22 Dec 1924	2	Commander, Scouting Fleet, 1923–1924.	(1867–1951)
22	Philip Andrews		21 Jun 1923	10 Oct 1925	2	Commander, U.S. Naval Forces in European Waters, 1923–1925.	(1866–1935)
23	Josiah S. McKean		22 Dec 1924	4 Sep 1926	2	Commander, Scouting Fleet, 1924–1926.	(1864–1951)
24	Richard H. Jackson		5 Oct 1925	3 Sep 1926	1	Commander, Battleship Divisions, Battle Fleet, 1925–1926.	(1866–1971) Promoted to admiral, 4 Sep 1926. Distant cousin of Air Force general Charles P. Cabell.
25	Roger Welles		10 Oct 1925	29 Oct 1926	1	Commander, U.S. Naval Forces in European Waters, 1925–1926.	(1862–1932) Director of Naval Intelligence, 1917–1919.
26	Ashley H. Robertson		4 Sep 1926	12 Jul 1928	2	Commander, Scouting Fleet, 1926–1928.	(1867–1930)
27	Louis R. de Steiguer		4 Sep 1926	9 Sep 1927	1	Commander, Battleship Divisions, Battle Fleet, 1926–1927.	(1867–1947) Promoted to admiral, 10 Sep 1927.
28	Guy H. Burrage		29 Oct 1926	15 Sep 1928	2	Commander, U.S. Naval Forces in European Waters, 1926–1928.	(1867–1954)
29	William V. Pratt		24 Sep 1927	25 Jun 1928	1	Commander, Battleship Divisions, Battle Fleet, 1927–1928.	(1869–1957) Promoted to admiral, 26 Jun 1928. President, Naval War College, 1925–1927.
30	Louis M. Nulton		26 Jun 1928	20 May 1929	1	Commander, Battleship Divisions, Battle Fleet, 1928–1929.	(1869–1954) Promoted to admiral, 21 May 1929. Superintendent, U.S. Naval Academy, 1925–1928.
31	Montgomery M. Taylor		12 Jul 1928	21 Jun 1929	1	Commander, Scouting Fleet, 1928–1929.	(1869–1952) Promoted to admiral, 1 Sep 1931. Grandnephew of U.S. President Zachary Taylor; distant cousin of Army general Montgomery C. Meigs.
32	John H. Dayton		15 Sep 1928	5 Sep 1929	1	Commander, U.S. Naval Forces in European Waters, 1928–1929.	(1869–1953)
33	Lucius A. Bostwick		21 May 1929	24 May 1930	1	Commander, Battleship Divisions, Battle Fleet, 1929–1930.	(1869–1940)
34	William C. Cole		21 Jun 1929	14 Jun 1930	1	Commander, Scouting Fleet, 1929–1930.	(1868–1935)
35	Richard H. Leigh		24 May 1930	14 Sep 1931	1	Commander, Battleship Divisions, Battle Fleet, 1930–1931.; Commander, Battleships, Battle Force, 1931.	(1870–1946) Promoted to admiral, 15 Sep 1931.
36	Arthur L. Willard		14 Jun 1930	24 Jun 1932	2	Commander, Scouting Fleet, 1930–1931.; Commander, Scouting Force, 1931–1932.	(1870–1935)
37	George R. Marvell		21 Nov 1930	16 Dec 1931	1	Commander, Light Cruiser Divisions, Scouting Fleet, 1927–1931.; Commander, Cruisers, Scouting Force, 1931.	(1869–1941)
38	Luke McNamee		15 Sep 1931	10 Aug 1932	1	Commander, Battleships, Battle Force, 1931–1932.	(1871–1952) Promoted to admiral, 11 Aug 1932. Governor of Guam, 1907; Director of Naval Intelligence, 1921–1923; President, Naval War College, 1933–1934.
39	William H. Standley		16 Dec 1931	19 May 1933	1	Commander, Cruisers, Scouting Force, 1931–1933.	(1872–1963) Promoted to admiral, 20 May 1933. U.S. Ambassador to the Soviet Union, 1942–1943.
40	Frank H. Clark		24 Jun 1932	20 May 1933	1	Commander, Scouting Force, 1932–1933.	(1871–1947)
41	Joel R. P. Pringle		12 Aug 1932	25 Sep 1932	0	Commander, Battleships, Battle Force, 1932.	(1873–1932) Died in office.
42	David F. Sellers		27 Sep 1932	9 Jun 1933	1	Commander, Battleships, Battle Force, 1932–1933.	(1874–1949) Promoted to admiral, 10 Jun 1933. Superintendent, U.S. Naval Academy, 1934–1938.
43	Frank H. Brumby		20 May 1933	14 Jun 1934	1	Commander, Scouting Force, 1933–1934.	(1874–1950) Promoted to admiral, 15 Jun 1934.
44	Harris Laning		26 May 1933	31 Mar 1935	2	Commander, Cruisers, Scouting Force, 1933–1935.	(1873–1941) Promoted to admiral, 1 Apr 1935. President, Naval War College, 1930–1933; Governor, U.S. Naval Home, 1937–1941.
45	Joseph M. Reeves		10 Jun 1933; 23 Feb 1942	30 Jun 1933; 15 Jun 1942	0	Commander, Battleships, Battle Force, 1933.; Lend-Lease Liaison Officer, 1941–1945.	(1872–1948); Naval aviation observer. Promoted to admiral, 1 Jul 1933.
46	Walton R. Sexton		1 Jul 1933	15 Jun 1934	1	Commander, Battleships, Battle Force, 1933–1934.	(1876–1943)
47	Edward H. Campbell		15 Jun 1934	1 Apr 1935	1	Commander, Scouting Force, 1934–1935.	(1872–1946)
48	Thomas T. Craven		15 Jun 1934; 16 Jun 1942	13 Jul 1935; 10 Nov 1945	4	Commander, Battleships, Battle Force, 1934–1935.; Superintendent, New York State Maritime Academy, 1942–1945.	(1873–1950)
49	Henry V. Butler		1 Apr 1935; 24 Jul 1942	9 Jun 1936; 31 Oct 1944	3	Commander, Aircraft, Battle Force, 1934–1936.; Administrative Officer, Office of the Secretary of the Navy, 1942–1944.	(1874–1957); Naval aviation observer.
50	Arthur J. Hepburn		1 Apr 1935	23 Jun 1936	1	Commander, Scouting Force, 1935–1936.	(1877–1964) Promoted to admiral, 24 Jun 1936.
51	William D. Leahy		13 Jul 1935	29 Mar 1936	1	Commander, Battleships, Battle Force, 1935–1936.	(1875–1959) Promoted to admiral, 30 Mar 1936; to fleet admiral, 15 Dec 1944. Governor of Puerto Rico, 1939–1940; U.S. Ambassador to France, 1941–1942. Wife's niece married Navy admiral David W. Bagley.
52	Clarence S. Kempff		30 Mar 1936	2 Jan 1937	1	Commander, Battleships, Battle Force, 1936–1937.	(1874–1959)
53	Frederick J. Horne		9 Jun 1936; 21 Mar 1942	29 Jan 1938; 28 Jan 1945	5	Commander, Aircraft, Battle Force, 1936–1938.; Vice Chief of Naval Operations, 1942–1945.	(1880–1959); Naval aviation observer. Promoted to admiral, 15 Dec 1944.
54	William T. Tarrant		24 Jun 1936; 1 Aug 1942	13 Jul 1938; 12 Nov 1945	5	Commander, Scouting Force, 1936–1938.; Adviser, Office of Strategic Services, 1942–1945.	(1878–1972)
55	Edward C. Kalbfus		2 Jan 1937	28 Jan 1938	1	Commander, Battleships, Battle Force, 1937–1938.	(1877–1954) Promoted to admiral, 29 Jan 1938. President, Naval War College, 1934–1936; 1939–1942.
56	John W. Greenslade		29 Jan 1938; 30 May 1942; 1 Feb 1944	20 May 1939; 1 Feb 1944; 24 Apr 1946	5	Commander, Battleships, Battle Force, 1938–1939.; Commander, Western Sea Frontier/Commandant, Twelfth Naval District, 1942–1944.; Coordinator, Naval Logistics, Pacific Coast, 1944.; Resources Coordinator, Western Sea Frontier, 1945.	(1880–1950)
57	Ernest J. King		29 Jan 1938	24 Jun 1939	1	Commander, Aircraft, Battle Force, 1938–1939.	(1878–1956); Naval aviator. Promoted to admiral, 1 Feb 1941; to fleet admiral, 17 Dec 1944. Awarded Congressional Gold Medal, 1946. Father-in-law of Air Force general Frederic H. Smith Jr.
58	Adolphus Andrews		13 Jul 1938; 30 May 1942; 1 Nov 1943	1 Feb 1941; 1 Nov 1943; 15 May 1945	6	Commander, Scouting Force, 1938–1941.; Commander, Eastern Sea Frontier, 1942–1943.; Chairman, Navy Manpower Survey Board, 1943–1945.	(1879–1948)
59	Charles P. Snyder		17 Jun 1939	5 Jan 1940	1	Commander, Battleships, Battle Force, 1939–1940.	(1879–1964) Promoted to admiral, 6 Jan 1940. President, Naval War College, 1937–1939.
60	Charles A. Blakely		24 Jun 1939	13 Jun 1940	1	Commander, Aircraft, Battle Force, 1939–1940.	(1879–1950); Naval aviation observer.
61	William S. Pye		6 Jan 1940; 1 Jul 1944	20 Sep 1942; 13 Dec 1945	4	Commander, Battleships, Battle Force, 1940–1941.; Commander, Battle Force, Pacific Fleet, 1941–1942.; President, Naval War College, 1942–1945.	(1880–1959)
62	William F. Halsey Jr.		13 Jun 1940	17 Nov 1942	2	Commander, Aircraft, Battle Force, 1940–1941.; Commander, Aircraft, Battle Force, Pacific Fleet, 1941–1942.; Commander, Carriers, Pacific Fleet, 1942.; Commander, South Pacific Area and South Pacific Force, 1942–1943.	(1882–1959); Naval aviator. Promoted to admiral, 18 Nov 1942; to fleet admiral, 4 Dec 1945.
63	Wilson Brown Jr.		1 Feb 1941; 1 Dec 1944	1 Jul 1942; 18 Sep 1945	2	Commander, Scouting Force, Pacific Fleet, 1941–1942.; Commander, Amphibious Force, Pacific Fleet, 1942.; Naval Aide to the President, 1943–1945.	(1881–1957)
64	Robert L. Ghormley		19 Sep 1941	1 Aug 1946	5	Special observer, American Embassy, London, 1940–1942.; Commander, South Pacific Area and South Pacific Force, 1942.; Commander, Hawaiian Sea Frontier/Commandant, Fourteenth Naval District, 1943–1944.; Commander, U.S. Naval Forces, Germany, 1944–1945.; Chairman, General Board of the Navy, 1946.	(1883–1958)
*	Arthur P. Fairfield		1 Nov 1941	14 Dec 1946	5	Chairman, Board of Medals and Decorations, U.S. Maritime Commission, 1941–1946.	(1877–1946) Died in office.
65	Royal E. Ingersoll		1 Jan 1942	30 Jun 1942	0	Commander in Chief, U.S. Atlantic Fleet, 1941–1944.	(1883–1976) Promoted to admiral, 1 Jul 1942.
*	Alfred W. Johnson		3 Jan 1942	14 Nov 1945	4	U.S. Naval Member, Joint Mexican-United States Defense Commission/Senior U.S. Naval Member, Permanent Joint Board on Defense, Canada-United States, 1942.; U.S. Naval Member, Joint Mexican-United States Defense Commission/Senior U.S. Naval Member, Permanent Joint Board on Defense, Canada-United States/U.S. Naval Delegate, Inter-American Defense Board, 1942–1945.	(1876–1963)
66	Samuel M. Robinson		31 Jan 1942	26 Aug 1945	4	Director, Office of Procurement and Material, 1942–1946.	(1882–1972) Engineering duty officer. Promoted to admiral, 27 Aug 1945. Administrator, Webb Institute of Naval Architecture, 1946–1951.
67	William A. Glassford Jr.		31 Jan 1942; 29 May 1943	2 Apr 1942; 1 Mar 1947	4	Commander, U.S. Naval Forces, Southwest Pacific, 1942.; Personal Representative of the President, with rank of Minister, French West Africa, 1943–1944.; Deputy Commander for Occupied Countries, U.S. Naval Forces in Europe, 1944–1945.; Commander, Eighth Fleet, 1945.; Commander, U.S. Naval Forces, Northwest African Waters, 1945.; Commander, U.S. Naval Forces, Germany, 1945–1946.	(1886–1958)
68	Herbert F. Leary		6 Feb 1942; 20 Sep 1942; 1 Nov 1943	11 Sep 1942; 1 Apr 1943; 16 Jan 1946	3	Commander, ANZAC Force, 1942.; Commander, Allied Naval Forces, Southwest Pacific Area/Commander, Southwest Pacific Force, 1942.; Commander, Battleships, Pacific Fleet, 1942–1943.; Commander, Eastern Sea Frontier, 1943–1945.; Commander, Eastern Sea Frontier/Gulf Sea Frontier/Sixteenth Fleet, 1945–1946.	(1885–1957) President, New York Maritime Academy, 1946–1949; President, New York State Maritime College, 1949–1951.
*	Harry E. Yarnell		23 Feb 1942	15 Jun 1942	0	Special Adviser to the Chinese Military Mission, 1941–1943.	(1875–1959)
69	William L. Calhoun		27 Feb 1942	1 Dec 1946	5	Commander, Service Force, Pacific Fleet, 1942–1945.; Commander, South Pacific Area, 1945.; Naval Inspector General, 1945–1946.; General Inspector, Western Sea Frontier, 1946.	(1884–1963) Great-grandson of U.S. Vice President John C. Calhoun.
70	Ferdinand L. Reichmuth		27 Feb 1942	22 Aug 1942	0	Commander, Service Force, Atlantic Fleet, 1942.	(1881–1978)
71	Jonas H. Ingram		27 Feb 1942	14 Nov 1944	3	Commander, Task Force 3, Atlantic Fleet, 1941–1942.; Commander, Task Force 23, Atlantic Fleet, 1942.; Commander, South Atlantic Force, 1942–1943.; Commander, Fourth Fleet, 1943–1944.	(1886–1952) Promoted to admiral, 15 Nov 1944. Commissioner, All-America Football Conference, 1947–1949. Awarded Medal of Honor, 1914.
72	Arthur L. Bristol Jr.		27 Feb 1942	20 Apr 1942	0	Commander, Task Force 4, Atlantic Fleet, 1941–1942.; Commander, Task Force 24, Atlantic Fleet, 1942.	(1886–1942); Naval aviator. Died in office.
73	Russell Willson		21 Mar 1942; 1 Jan 1943	1 Jan 1943; 5 Feb 1946	4	Chief of Staff/Aide to the Commander in Chief, United States Fleet, 1941–1942.; Deputy Commander in Chief, United States Fleet, 1942.; Deputy Commander in Chief, United States Fleet/Navy Member, Joint Strategic Survey Committee, Joint Chiefs of Staff, 1942.; Navy Member, Joint Strategic Survey Committee, Joint Chiefs of Staff, 1942.; Navy Member, Joint Strategic Survey Committee, Joint Chiefs of Staff, 1943–1946.	(1883–1948)
74	Roland M. Brainard		20 Apr 1942; 1 Nov 1943	2 May 1943; 22 Aug 1946	4	Commander, Task Force 24, Atlantic Fleet, 1942–1943.; Senior Naval Member, Joint Production Survey Committee, Joint Chiefs of Staff, 1943–1945.	(1886–1967)
75	John H. Hoover		11 Jun 1942; 1 May 1944	12 Aug 1943; 1 Jul 1948	5	Commander, Caribbean Sea Frontier/Commandant, Tenth Naval District, 1942–1943.; Commander, Forward Area, Central Pacific, 1944–1945.; Commander, Marianas Area, 1945.; Deputy Commander in Chief, Pacific Fleet and Pacific Ocean Areas, 1945.; Commander, Fleet Air, West Coast, 1945–1946.; Member, General Board of the Navy, 1946.; President, Naval Examining and Retiring Board, 1946–1948.	(1887–1970); Naval aviator. Retired as admiral, 1 Jul 1948.
76	Frank J. Fletcher		26 Jun 1942	1 May 1947	5	Commander, Cruisers, Pacific Fleet, 1942.; Commander, Northwest Sea Frontier/Commandant, Thirteenth Naval District, 1942–1943.; Commander, North Pacific Area/Northwest Sea Frontier, 1943–1944.; Commander, North Pacific Area/Alaskan Sea Frontier, 1944–1945.; Member, General Board of the Navy, 1945–1946.; Chairman, General Board of the Navy, 1946–1947.	(1885–1973) Retired as admiral, 1 May 1947. Awarded Medal of Honor, 1914. Nephew of Navy four-star admiral Frank F. Fletcher.
77	Charles S. Freeman		27 Jun 1942	1 Dec 1942	0	Commander, Northwest Sea Frontier/Commandant, Thirteenth Naval District, 1942.	(1878–1969)
78	Richard S. Edwards Jr.		20 Aug 1942	2 Apr 1945	3	Chief of Staff, United States Fleet, 1942–1944.; Deputy Commander in Chief, United States Fleet/Deputy Chief of Naval Operations, 1944–1945.	(1885–1956) Promoted to admiral, 3 Apr 1945.
79	Alexander Sharp Jr.		22 Aug 1942	11 Oct 1944	2	Commander, Service Force, Atlantic Fleet, 1942–1944.	(1885–1975)
80	Arthur S. Carpender		22 Sep 1942; 3 Apr 1945	30 Nov 1943; 1 Nov 1946	3	Commander, Allied Naval Forces, Southwest Pacific Area/Southwest Pacific Force, 1942–1943.; Commander, Allied Naval Forces, Southwest Pacific Area/Seventh Fleet, 1943.; Commander, Midwest Naval Area/Commandant, Ninth Naval District, 1945–1946.; Director of Public Relations, 1946.	(1884–1959) Retired as admiral, 1 Nov 1946.
81	John H. Towers		12 Oct 1942	6 Nov 1945	3	Commander, Air Force, Pacific Fleet, 1942–1944.; Deputy Commander in Chief, Pacific Fleet and Pacific Ocean Areas, 1944–1945.	(1885–1955); Naval aviator. Promoted to admiral, 7 Nov 1945.
82	Henry K. Hewitt		26 Nov 1942	2 Apr 1945	2	Commander, Amphibious Force, Atlantic Fleet, 1942–1943.; Commander, U.S. Naval Forces, Northwest African Waters/Eighth Fleet, 1943–1945.	(1887–1972) Promoted to admiral, 3 Apr 1945.
83	Aubrey W. Fitch		28 Dec 1942	1 Jul 1947	5	Commander, Aircraft, South Pacific Force, 1942–1944.; Deputy Chief of Naval Operations (Air), 1944–1945.; Superintendent, U.S. Naval Academy/Commandant, Severn River Naval Command, 1945–1947.; Special duty, Office of the Under Secretary of the Navy, 1947.; Senior Member, Naval Clemency and Prison Inspection Board, 1947.	(1883–1948); Naval aviator. Retired as admiral, 1 Jul 1947.
*	Joseph K. Taussig		28 Jan 1943; 16 Jul 1943	30 Jan 1943; 27 Apr 1947	4	Senior Member, Naval Clemency and Prison Inspection Board, 1943–1946.; Special duty, Office of the Secretary of the Navy, 1946–1947.	(1877–1947)
84	Raymond A. Spruance		29 May 1943	15 Feb 1944	1	Commander, Central Pacific Force, 1943–1944.	(1886–1969) Promoted to admiral, 16 Feb 1944. President, Naval War College, 1946–1948; U.S. Ambassador to the Philippines, 1952–1955.
85	Thomas C. Kinkaid		16 Jun 1943	2 Apr 1945	2	Commander, North Pacific Area, 1943.; Commander, Allied Naval Forces Southwest Pacific/Seventh Fleet, 1943–1945.	(1888–1972) Promoted to admiral, 3 Apr 1945. Brother-in-law of Navy admiral Husband E. Kimmel.
86	Arthur B. Cook		22 Jul 1943	15 May 1944	1	Commander, Caribbean Sea Frontier/Commandant, Tenth Naval District, 1943–1944.	(1881–1952); Naval aviator. Retired 1 Dec 1944.
87	John S. McCain Sr.		6 Aug 1943	6 Sep 1945	2	Deputy Chief of Naval Operations (Air), 1943–1944.; Commander, Second Fast Carrier Force, Pacific Fleet, 1944–1945.	(1884–1945); Naval aviator. Promoted to admiral, 6 Sep 1945. Father of Navy admiral John S. McCain Jr.; grandfather of U.S. Senator John S. McCain III. Died in office.
88	Patrick N. L. Bellinger		5 Oct 1943	1 Oct 1947	4	Commander, Air Force, Atlantic Fleet, 1943–1946.; Member, General Board of the Navy, 1946–1947.	(1885–1962); Naval aviator.
89	Charles A. Lockwood Jr.		5 Oct 1943	1 Sep 1947	4	Commander, Submarine Force, Pacific Fleet, 1943–1945.; Naval Inspector General, 1946–1947.	(1890–1967)
90	John H. Newton		19 Oct 1943	26 Nov 1945	2	Deputy Commander in Chief, Pacific Ocean Areas, 1943.; Deputy Commander in Chief, Pacific Fleet and Pacific Ocean Areas, 1943–1944.; Deputy Commander, South Pacific Area/South Pacific Force, 1944.; Commander, South Pacific Area/South Pacific Force, 1944–1945.; Inspector General, Pacific Fleet and Pacific Ocean Areas, 1945.; Deputy Commander in Chief, Pacific Fleet and Pacific Ocean Areas, 1945.	(1881–1948)
91	David W. Bagley		1 Feb 1944	1 Apr 1947	3	Commander, Western Sea Frontier, 1944.; Commander, Hawaiian Sea Frontier/Commandant, Fourteenth Naval District, 1944–1945.; U.S. Naval Member, Joint Mexican-United States Defense Commission/Senior U.S. Naval Member, Permanent Joint Board on Defense, Canada-United States/U.S. Naval Delegate, Inter-American Defense Board, 1945–1946.	(1883–1960) Retired as admiral, 1 Apr 1947. Father of Navy admirals David H. Bagley and Worth H. Bagley; grandson of North Carolina Governor Jonathan Worth; aunt married U.S. Secretary of the Navy Josephus Daniels; wife's aunt married Navy admiral William D. Leahy.
92	Randall Jacobs		1 Feb 1944; 1 Nov 1946	15 Sep 1945; 1 Nov 1952	8	Chief of Naval Personnel/Chief, Bureau of Naval Personnel, 1942–1945.; Governor, U.S. Naval Home, 1946–1952.	(1885–1967)
93	Ross T. McIntire		1 Feb 1944	3 Mar 1947	3	Surgeon General, U.S. Navy/Chief, Bureau of Medicine and Surgery, 1938–1946.	(1889–1959) Medical Corps.
94	Ben Moreell		1 Feb 1944	10 Jun 1946	2	Chief, Bureau of Yards and Docks, 1937–1945.; Chief, Material Division, Office of the Assistant Secretary of the Navy, 1945–1946.; Deputy Coal Mines Administrator, 1946.; Coal Mines Administrator, 1946.	(1892–1978) Civil Engineer Corps. Promoted to admiral, 11 Jun 1946.
95	Richmond K. Turner		7 Mar 1944	23 May 1945	1	Commander, Amphibious Forces, Pacific/Fifth Amphibious Force, Pacific Fleet, 1944–1945.; Commander, Amphibious Forces, Pacific, 1945.	(1885–1961); Naval aviator. Promoted to admiral, 24 May 1945.
96	Willis A. Lee Jr.		21 Mar 1944	25 Aug 1945	1	Commander, Battleships, Pacific Fleet, 1943–1944.; Commander, Battleship Squadron Two, Pacific Fleet, 1944–1945.; Commander, Composite Task Force, Atlantic Fleet, 1945.	(1888–1945) Died in office.
97	Marc A. Mitscher		21 Mar 1944	28 Feb 1946	2	Commander, First Fast Carrier Force, Pacific Fleet, 1944–1945.; Deputy Chief of Naval Operations (Air), 1945–1946.	(1887–1947); Naval aviator. Promoted to admiral, 1 Mar 1946.
98	Robert C. Giffen		15 May 1944	3 Dec 1945	2	Commander, Caribbean Sea Frontier/Commandant, Tenth Naval District, 1944–1945.; Commander, Service Force, Atlantic Fleet, 1945.	(1886–1962)
*	Emory S. Land		1 Jul 1944	15 Jan 1946	2	Chairman, U.S. Maritime Commission, 1938–1946.	(1879–1971) Construction Corps.
99	Theodore S. Wilkinson		12 Aug 1944	21 Feb 1946	2	Commander, Third Amphibious Force, Pacific Fleet, 1944–1945.; Member, Joint Strategic Survey Committee, Joint Chiefs of Staff, 1946.	(1888–1946) Died in office. Awarded Medal of Honor, 1914.
100	Alan G. Kirk		10 Sep 1944	1 Mar 1946	1	Commander, U.S. Naval Forces, France, 1944–1945.; Member, General Board of the Navy, 1945–1946.	(1888–1963) Retired as admiral, 1 Mar 1946. Director of Naval Intelligence, 1941; U.S. Ambassador to Belgium and Luxembourg, 1946–1947; to Soviet Union, 1949–1952; to China, 1962–1963.
101	Charles M. Cooke Jr.		28 Sep 1944	7 Jan 1946	1	Chief of Staff, United States Fleet, 1944–1945.; Deputy Chief of Naval Operations (Operations), 1945.	(1886–1970) Promoted to admiral, 8 Jan 1946.
102	Howard L. Vickery		30 Oct 1944; 1 Oct 1945	1 Oct 1945; 1 Jan 1946	1	Vice Chairman, U.S. Maritime Commission, 1942–1945.; Vice Chairman, U.S. Maritime Commission, 1945.	(1892–1946) Engineering duty officer (ship or hull construction).
103	William R. Munroe		11 Nov 1944	1 May 1947	2	Commander, Fourth Fleet, 1944–1945.; Commander, South Atlantic Force, 1945.; Commander, Caribbean Sea Frontier/Commandant, Tenth Naval District, 1945–1947.	(1886–1966)
104	Charles H. McMorris		27 Nov 1944	30 Jun 1948	4	Chief of Staff/Aide to the Commander in Chief, Pacific Fleet and Pacific Ocean Areas, 1943–1946.; Commander, Fourth Fleet, 1946.; Member, General Board of the Navy, 1946–1947.; Chairman, General Board of the Navy, 1947–1948.	(1890–1954)
105	George D. Murray		29 Nov 1944	1 Aug 1951	7	Commander, Air Force, Pacific Fleet, 1944–1945.; Commander, Marianas, 1945.; Commander, Midwest Naval Area/Commandant, Ninth Naval District, 1946–1947.; Commander, First Task Fleet, 1947–1948.; Commander, Western Sea Frontier/Pacific Reserve Fleet, 1948–1951.	(1889–1956); Naval aviator. Retired as admiral, 1 Aug 1951.
106	Jesse B. Oldendorf		7 Dec 1944	1 Sep 1948	4	Commander, Battleship Squadron One, Pacific Fleet, 1944–1945.; Commandant, Eleventh Naval District, 1945–1947.; Commander, Western Sea Frontier/Pacific Reserve Fleet, 1947–1948.	(1887–1974) Retired as admiral, 1 Sep 1948.
107	Daniel E. Barbey		9 Dec 1944	30 Jun 1948	4	Commander, Seventh Amphibious Force, Pacific Fleet, 1943–1945.; Commander, Seventh Fleet/Seventh Amphibious Force, Pacific Fleet, 1945–1946.; Commander, Amphibious Forces, Atlantic Fleet, 1946.; Commander, Fourth Fleet, 1946–1947.; Commander, Caribbean Sea Frontier/Commandant, Tenth Naval District, 1947–1950.	(1889–1969)
108	Sherwoode A. Taffinder		23 Dec 1944	18 Apr 1946	1	Commander, Service Force, Atlantic Fleet, 1944–1945.; Commander, Hawaiian Sea Frontier/Commandant, Fourteenth Naval District, 1945–1946.	(1884–1965)
*	Olaf M. Hustvedt		1 Mar 1945	3 Jun 1946	1	Member, General Board of the Navy, 1945–1946.	(1886–1978)
109	William W. Smith		6 Mar 1945	1 Oct 1946	2	Commander, Service Force, Pacific Fleet, 1945–1946.; Member, General Board of the Navy, 1946.; Chairman, U.S. Maritime Commission, 1946–1949.	(1888–1966)
110	Walter S. Anderson		3 Apr 1945	1 Mar 1946	1	Commander, Gulf Sea Frontier/Commandant, Seventh Naval District, 1944–1945.	(1881–1981)
111	William S. Farber		3 Apr 1945	1 Dec 1946	2	Sub Chief of Naval Operations, 1943–1945.; Deputy Chief of Naval Operations (Logistics), 1945–1946.	(1885–1963)
112	James L. Kauffman		3 Apr 1945	20 Jun 1946	1	Commander, Philippine Sea Frontier, 1944–1946.	(1887–1963)
113	Edward L. Cochrane		3 Apr 1945	1 Oct 1947	2	Chief, Bureau of Ships, 1942–1946.; Chief, Materiel Division, Office of the Assistant Secretary of the Navy, 1946–1947.	(1892–1959) Engineering duty officer (ship or hull construction)
114	Harry W. Hill		22 Apr 1945; 21 Oct 1952	1 May 1952; 21 May 1954	9	Commander, Fifth Amphibious Force, Pacific Fleet, 1945.; Commandant, Army-Navy Staff College, 1945–1946.; Commandant, National War College, 1946–1949.; Chairman, General Board of the Navy, 1949–1950.; Superintendent, U.S. Naval Academy, 1950–1952.; Governor, U.S. Naval Home, 1952–1954.	(1890–1971) Retired as admiral, 1 May 1952.
115	Frederick C. Sherman		13 Jul 1945	1 Mar 1947	2	Commander, First Fast Carrier Force, Pacific Fleet, 1945–1946.; Commander, Fifth Fleet, 1946.	(1880–1957); Naval aviator. Retired as admiral, 1 Mar 1947.
116	Louis E. Denfeld		1 Sep 1945	31 Jan 1947	1	Chief of Naval Personnel/Chief, Bureau of Naval Personnel, 1945.; Deputy Chief of Naval Operations (Personnel)/Chief of Naval Personnel/Chief, Bureau of Naval Personnel, 1945–1947.	(1891–1972) Promoted to admiral, 7 Jan 1946. Candidate for Republican Party nomination for Governor of Massachusetts, 1950.
117	DeWitt C. Ramsey		26 Nov 1945	27 Dec 1945	0	Deputy Commander in Chief, Pacific Fleet and Pacific Ocean Areas, 1945.	(1888–1961); Naval aviator. Promoted to admiral, 28 Dec 1945.
118	Howard F. Kingman		10 Dec 1945	30 Nov 1946	1	Commander, Third Fleet, 1945–1946.	(1890–1968)
119	Alfred E. Montgomery		10 Dec 1945	14 Aug 1947	2	Commander, Air Force, Pacific Fleet, 1945–1946.; Commander, Fifth Fleet, 1946–1947.; Commander, First Task Fleet, 1947.	(1891–1972); Naval aviator.
120	John L. Hall Jr.		10 Dec 1945	1 May 1953	7	Commander, Amphibious Forces, Pacific Fleet, 1945–1946.; Commander, Hawaiian Sea Frontier/Commandant, Fourteenth Naval District, 1946–1948.; Commandant, Armed Forces Staff College, 1948–1951.; Commander, Western Sea Frontier/Pacific Reserve Fleet, 1951–1953.	(1891–1978) Retired as admiral, May 1953.
121	Thomas L. Gatch		10 Dec 1945	1 Sep 1947	2	Commander, Service Force, Atlantic Fleet, 1945–1947.	(1891–1954)
122	Richard L. Conolly		11 Dec 1945; 1 Dec 1950	22 Sep 1946; 1 Nov 1953	4	Deputy Chief of Naval Operations (Operations), 1945–1946.; Deputy Chief of Naval Operations (Administration), 1946.; U.S. Naval Advisor to the Secretary of State for the Paris Peace Conference/U.S. Naval Advisor to the Council of Foreign Ministers during the period of the Peace Conference/U.S. Naval Advisor to the European Advisory Commission, 1946.; President, Naval War College, 1950–1953.	(1892–1962) Promoted to admiral, 23 Sep 1946. President, Long Island University, 1953–1962.
123	William H. P. Blandy		11 Dec 1945	2 Feb 1947	1	Deputy Chief of Naval Operations (Special Weapons), 1945–1946.; Deputy Chief of Naval Operations (Special Weapons)/Commander, Joint Army-Navy Task Force One, 1946.; Commander, Eighth Fleet, 1946–1947.; Commander, Second Task Fleet, 1947.	(1890–1954) Promoted to admiral, 3 Feb 1947.
124	Bernhard H. Bieri		11 Dec 1945; 1 Mar 1949	15 Apr 1948; 1 Jun 1951	5	Deputy Chief of Naval Operations (Administration), 1945–1946.; Commander, Tenth Fleet, 1946.; Commander, U.S. Naval Forces Mediterranean, 1946–1948.; U.S. Naval Representative, Military Staff Committee, United Nations/Commandant, Eleventh Naval District, 1949–1951.	(1889–1971)
125	George F. Hussey Jr.		11 Dec 1945	4 Sep 1947	2	Chief, Bureau of Ordnance, 1944–1947.	(1894–1983)
126	Oscar C. Badger II		13 Dec 1945; 24 Feb 1948	7 Aug 1947; 1 Jul 1952	6	Commander, Service Forces, Pacific Fleet, 1945–1947.; Commander, Naval Forces Western Pacific, 1948–1949.; Commander, Seventh Task Fleet, 1949.; Commander, Eastern Sea Frontier/Atlantic Reserve Fleet, 1950–1951.; Commander, Eastern Sea Frontier/Atlantic Reserve Fleet/U.S. Naval Representative, Military Staff Committee, United Nations, 1951.; Commander, Eastern Sea Frontier/Atlantic Reserve Fleet/U.S. Naval Representative, Military Staff Committee, United Nations/NATO forces, American Defense Area, 1951–1952.	(1890–1958) Retired as admiral, 1 Jul 1952. Awarded Medal of Honor, 1914. Cousin of U.S. Secretary of the Navy George E. Badger.
127	Lynde D. McCormick		19 Dec 1945; 3 Apr 1950; 3 May 1954	13 Nov 1948; 21 Dec 1950; 16 Aug 1956	6	Deputy Commander in Chief, Pacific Fleet and Pacific Ocean Areas, 1945–1947.; Deputy Commander in Chief, U.S. Pacific Fleet, 1947.; Commander, Battleships-Cruisers, Atlantic Fleet, 1947–1948.; Vice Chief of Naval Operations, 1950–1951.; President, Naval War College, 1954–1956.	(1895–1956) Promoted to admiral, 22 Dec 1950. Died in office.
128	Arthur W. Radford		28 Dec 1945	29 Apr 1949	3	Deputy Chief of Naval Operations (Air), 1946–1947.; Commander, Second Task Fleet, 1947.; Vice Chief of Naval Operations, 1948–1949.	(1896–1973); Naval aviator. Promoted to admiral, 30 Apr 1949. Married aunt of Army general Michael S. Davison.
129	Forrest P. Sherman		28 Dec 1945	1 Nov 1949	4	Deputy Chief of Naval Operations (Operations), 1945–1948.; Commander, U.S. Naval Forces Mediterranean, 1948.; Commander, Sixth Task Fleet, 1948–1949.	(1896–1951); Naval aviator. Promoted to admiral, 2 Nov 1949.
130	Robert M. Griffin		10 Jan 1946	9 Jul 1948	3	Commander, Naval Forces Far East, 1946–1948.	(1889–1976); Naval aviation observer.
131	Walter S. DeLany		10 Jan 1946; 30 Jun 1952	1 Jul 1948; 1 Feb 1953	3	Commander, Battleships-Cruisers, Pacific Fleet, 1946–1948.; Commander, Eastern Sea Frontier/Atlantic Reserve Fleet, 1952–1953.	(1891–1980)
132	William M. Fechteler		24 Jan 1946	31 Jan 1950	4	Commander, Battleships-Cruisers, Atlantic Fleet, 1946–1947.; Deputy Chief of Naval Operations (Personnel), 1947–1950.	(1896–1967) Promoted to admiral, 1 Feb 1950.
133	Gerald F. Bogan		1 Feb 1946	1 Feb 1950	4	Commander, Air Force, Atlantic Fleet, 1946–1948.; Commander, First Task Fleet, 1949–1950.	(1894–1973); Naval aviator.
134	Earle W. Mills		6 Feb 1946	1 Mar 1949	3	Assistant Chief, Bureau of Ships, 1942–1946.; Chief, Bureau of Ships, 1946–1949.	(1896–1968) Engineering duty officer.
135	Robert B. Carney		15 Jun 1946	31 Oct 1950	4	Deputy Chief of Naval Operations (Logistics), 1946–1950.; Commander, Second Fleet, 1950.	(1895–1990) Promoted to admiral, 1 Nov 1950. Aunt married Navy admiral Frank B. Upham.
136	Harold G. Bowen Sr.		10 Jul 1946	1 Jun 1947	1	Chief of Naval Research, 1946–1947.	(1883–1965) Engineering duty officer.
137	William J. Carter Jr.		22 Aug 1946	1 Oct 1946	0	Chief, Bureau of Supplies and Accounts, 1945–1946.	(1893–1971) Supply Corps.
138	John D. Price		1 Sep 1946	1 Jun 1954	8	Commander, Air Force, Pacific Fleet, 1946–1948.; Deputy Chief of Naval Operations (Air), 1948–1949.; Vice Chief of Naval Operations, 1949–1950.; Chief of Naval Air Training, 1950–1954.	(1892–1957); Naval aviator. Retired as admiral, 1 Jun 1954.
139	John L. McCrea		16 Sep 1946	29 Feb 1952	5	Deputy Chief of Naval Operations (Administration), 1946–1947.; Deputy Commander in Chief, U.S. Pacific Fleet, 1948–1949.; Director of Staff, Personnel Policy Board, National Military Establishment, 1949.; Director of Staff, Personnel Policy Board, Department of Defense, 1949–1952.	(1891–1990)
140	Donald B. Duncan		31 Jan 1947	9 Aug 1951	5	Deputy Commander in Chief, Pacific Fleet, 1947.; Deputy Chief of Naval Operations (Air), 1947–1948.; Commander, Second Task Fleet, 1948–1950.; Deputy Chief of Naval Operations (Operations), 1950–1951.	(1896–1975); Naval aviator. Promoted to admiral, 10 Aug 1951. Governor, U.S. Naval Home, 1957–1962. Brother-in-law of U.S. Secretary of Commerce Harry L. Hopkins.
141	Francis S. Low		12 Mar 1947	1 Jul 1956	9	Commander, Service Force, Pacific Fleet, 1947–1950.; Deputy Chief of Naval Operations (Logistics), 1950–1953.; Commander, Western Sea Frontier, 1953–1956.	(1894–1964) Retired as admiral, 1 Jul 1956.
142	Harold B. Sallada		11 May 1947	1 Oct 1949	2	Deputy Commander in Chief, Pacific Fleet, 1947–1948.; Commander, Air Force, Pacific Fleet, 1948–1949.	(1895–1977); Naval aviator. Retired as admiral, 1 Oct 1949.
143	Arthur C. Miles		26 Jan 1948	4 Oct 1949	2	Chief of Naval Material, 1948–1949.	(1893–1972) Aeronautical engineering duty officer.
144	Arthur D. Struble		14 Apr 1948	1 Jul 1956	8	Deputy Chief of Naval Operations (Operations), 1948–1950.; Commander, Seventh Fleet, 1950–1951.; Commander, First Fleet, 1951–1952.; U.S. Naval Representative, Military Staff Committee, United Nations, 1952–1953.; Chairman, U.S. Military Delegation, Military Staff Committee, United Nations, 1953–1955.; Commander, Eastern Sea Frontier/Atlantic Reserve Fleet, 1955–1956.	(1894–1983) Retired as admiral, 1 Jul 1956.
145	Russell S. Berkey		9 Jul 1948	1 Sep 1950	2	Commander, Naval Forces Far East, 1948–1949.; Commander, Seventh Fleet, 1949–1950.; Chief of Information, 1950.	(1893–1984) Retired as admiral, 1 Sep 1950.
146	Donald B. Beary		1 Nov 1948	1 Oct 1950	2	President, Naval War College, 1948–1950.	(1888–1966)
147	Felix B. Stump		3 Dec 1948	9 Jul 1953	5	Commander, Air Force, Atlantic Fleet, 1948–1951.; Commander, Second Fleet, 1951–1953.	(1894–1972); Naval aviator. Promoted to admiral, 10 Jul 1953.
148	John W. Reeves Jr.		1 Apr 1949	1 May 1950	1	Chief of Naval Air Training, 1948–1950.	(1888–1967); Naval aviator. Retired as admiral, 1 May 1950. General Manager, Los Angeles International Airport, 1950–1952.
149	Calvin T. Durgin		16 May 1949	22 Jan 1951	2	Deputy Chief of Naval Operations (Air), 1949–1950.; Commander, First Fleet, 1950–1951.	(1893–1965); Naval aviator.
150	C. Turner Joy		26 Aug 1949	1 Jul 1954	5	Commander, Naval Forces Far East, 1949–1952.; Superintendent, U.S. Naval Academy/Commander, Severn River Naval Command, 1952–1954.	(1895–1956) Retired as admiral, 1 Jul 1954.
151	Thomas L. Sprague		1 Oct 1949	1 Apr 1952	3	Commander, Air Force, Pacific Fleet/First Task Fleet, 1950.; Commander, Air Force, Pacific Fleet/First Fleet, 1950.; Commander, Air Force, Pacific Fleet, 1950–1952.	(1894–1972); Naval aviator. Retired as admiral, 1 Apr 1952.
152	E. Dorsey Foster		4 Oct 1949	31 Dec 1950	1	Chief of Naval Material, 1949–1950.	(1896–1979) Supply Corps.
153	John J. Ballentine		14 Nov 1949	1 May 1954	4	Commander, Sixth Fleet, 1949–1951.; Commander, Air Force, Atlantic Fleet, 1951–1954.	(1896–1970); Naval aviator. Retired as admiral, 1 May 1954.
154	John H. Cassady		16 Jan 1950	18 Mar 1954	4	Deputy Chief of Naval Operations (Air), 1950–1952.; Commander, Sixth Fleet, 1952–1954.	(1896–1969); Naval aviator. Promoted to admiral, 19 Mar 1954.
155	John W. Roper		26 Jan 1950	30 Mar 1951	1	Deputy Chief of Naval Operations (Personnel)/Chief of Naval Personnel/Chief, Bureau of Naval Personnel, 1950–1951.	(1898–1963) Son of U.S. Secretary of Commerce Daniel C. Roper.
156	Matthias B. Gardner		28 Sep 1950	1 Aug 1956	6	Commander, Second Fleet, 1950–1951.; Commander, Sixth Fleet, 1951–1952.; Deputy Chief of Naval Operations (Air), 1952–1953.; Deputy Chief of Naval Operations (Operations), 1953–1954.; Deputy Chief of Naval Operations (Plans and Policy), 1954–1956.	(1897–1975); Naval aviator. Retired as admiral, 1 Aug 1956.
157	Jerauld Wright		7 Nov 1950	11 Apr 1954	3	Commander, Amphibious Forces, Atlantic Fleet, 1948–1950.; Deputy U.S. Representative, Standing Group, NATO Military Committee, 1950–1952.; Commander, U.S. Naval Forces, Eastern Atlantic, 1952.; Commander in Chief, U.S. Naval Forces, Eastern Atlantic and Mediterranean, 1952–1954.	(1898–1995) Promoted to admiral, 12 Apr 1954. U.S. Ambassador to China, 1963–1965.
158	Albert G. Noble		29 Dec 1950	1 Oct 1951	1	Chief of Naval Material, 1950–1951.	(1885–1980) Retired as admiral, 1 Oct 1951.
159	Arthur C. Davis		12 Feb 1951; 1 Apr 1955	1 Apr 1955; 1 Oct 1955	5	Director, Joint Staff, 1949–1952.; Deputy U.S. Representative, Standing Group, NATO Military Committee, 1952–1953.; Director, Office of Foreign Military Affairs, Department of Defense, 1953–1954.; Deputy Assistant Secretary of Defense (International Security Affairs)/Director, Office of Foreign Military Affairs, Department of Defense, 1954–1955.; Deputy Assistant Secretary of Defense (International Security Affairs), 1955.	(1893–1965); Naval aviator. Retired as admiral, 1 Apr 1955.
160	Ingolf N. Kiland		12 Feb 1951	26 Jan 1953	2	Commander, Amphibious Force, U.S. Pacific Fleet, 1950–1952.; Commander, Amphibious Force, U.S. Pacific Fleet/First Fleet, 1952.; Commander, Amphibious Force, U.S. Pacific Fleet, 1952–1953.	(1895–1992)
161	Robert P. Briscoe		12 Feb 1951	1 Jul 1956	5	Commander, Amphibious Force, Atlantic Fleet, 1950–1952.; Commander, Naval Forces Far East/Seventh Fleet, 1952.; Commander, Naval Forces Far East, 1952–1954.; Deputy Chief of Naval Operations (Fleet Operations and Readiness), 1954–1956.	(1897–1968) Promoted to admiral, 2 Jul 1956.
162	Harold M. Martin		15 Feb 1951	1 Feb 1956	5	Commander, First Fleet, 1951.; Commander, Seventh Fleet, 1951–1952.; Commander, Air Force, Pacific Fleet, 1952–1953.; Commander, Air Force, Pacific Fleet/First Fleet, 1953.; Commander, Air Force, Pacific Fleet, 1953–1956.	(1896–1972); Naval aviator. Retired as admiral, 1 Feb 1956.
163	Laurance T. DuBose		30 Mar 1951	1 Jun 1955	4	Commander, First Task Fleet, 1948–1949.; Deputy Chief of Naval Operations (Personnel)/Chief of Naval Personnel/Chief, Bureau of Naval Personnel, 1951–1953.; Commander, Eastern Sea Frontier/Atlantic Reserve Fleet, 1953–1955.	(1893–1967) Retired as admiral, 1 Jun 1955.
164	William M. Callaghan		11 Apr 1951	1 Mar 1957	6	Commander, Military Sea Transportation Service, 1949–1952.; Commander, Amphibious Forces Pacific Fleet, 1953–1954.; Commander, Naval Forces Far East, 1954–1956.; Commander, Western Sea Frontier, 1956–1957.	(1897–1991)
165	James Fife Jr.		10 Aug 1951	1 Aug 1955	4	Deputy Chief of Naval Operations (Operations), 1951–1953.; Deputy Commander in Chief, Allied Forces Mediterranean, 1953–1955.	(1897–1975) Retired as admiral, 1 Aug 1955. Director, Mystic Seaport, 1956–1975.
166	Charles W. Fox		10 Oct 1951	1 Aug 1953	2	Chief of Naval Material, 1951–1953.	(1894–1975) Supply Corps.
167	Frank G. Fahrion		5 Jan 1952	1 May 1956	4	Commander, Amphibious Force, U.S. Atlantic Fleet, 1952–1956.	(1894–1970) Retired as admiral, 1 May 1956.
168	Joseph J. Clark		20 May 1952	1 Dec 1953	2	Commander, First Fleet, 1952.; Commander, Seventh Fleet, 1952–1953.	(1893–1971); Naval aviator. Retired as admiral, Dec 1953.
169	Ralph A. Ofstie		16 Jun 1952	18 Nov 1956	4	Commander, First Fleet, 1952–1953.; Deputy Chief of Naval Operations (Air), 1953–1955.; Commander, Sixth Fleet, 1955–1956.	(1897–1956); Naval aviator. Died in office.
170	Francis C. Denebrink		20 Dec 1952	1 Jul 1956	4	Commander, Military Sea Transportation Service, 1952–1956.	(1896–1987)
171	James L. Holloway Jr.		2 Feb 1953	31 Dec 1957	5	Deputy Chief of Naval Operations (Personnel)/Chief of Naval Personnel/Chief, Bureau of Naval Personnel, 1953–1956.; Deputy Chief of Naval Operations (Personnel and Naval Reserve)/Chief of Naval Personnel/Chief, Bureau of Naval Personnel, 1953–1957.; Commander in Chief, U.S. Naval Forces, Eastern Atlantic and Mediterranean/Commander, Subordinate Command U.S. Atlantic Fleet, 1957–1959.	(1898–1984) Promoted to admiral, 1 Jan 1958. Superintendent, U.S. Naval Academy, 1947–1950; Governor, U.S. Naval Home, 1962–1966. Father of Navy admiral James L. Holloway III.
172	Roscoe F. Good		27 Mar 1953	1 Mar 1958	5	Deputy Chief of Naval Operations (Logistics), 1953–1956.; Commander, Naval Forces Far East, 1956–1958.	(1897–1974) Retired as admiral, 1 Mar 1958.
173	Thomas S. Combs		30 Jun 1953	1 Apr 1960	7	Commander, Second Fleet, 1953–1954.; Commander, Sixth Fleet, 1954–1955.; Deputy Chief of Naval Operations (Air), 1955–1956.; Deputy Chief of Naval Operations (Fleet Operations and Readiness), 1956–1957.; Deputy Chief of Naval Operations (Fleet Operations, Readiness, Research and Development), 1957–1958.; Deputy Chief of Naval Operations (Fleet Operations and Readiness), 1958.; Commander, Eastern Sea Frontier/Atlantic Reserve Fleet/U.S. Naval Representative, Military Staff Committee, United Nations/Commandant, Third Naval District/Commander, Naval Base, New York, 1958–1960.	(1898–1964); Naval aviator.
174	John E. Gingrich		1 Aug 1953	1 Oct 1954	1	Deputy Chief of Naval Operations (Administration), 1953.; Chief of Naval Material, 1953–1954.	(1897–1960) Retired as admiral, 1 Oct 1954.
175	William K. Phillips		1 Oct 1953	1 Aug 1955	2	Commander, First Fleet, 1953–1955.	(1894–1986) Retired as admiral, 1 Aug 1955.
176	Alfred M. Pride		1 Dec 1953	1 Oct 1959	6	Commander, Seventh Fleet, 1953–1955.; Commander, Seventh Fleet/Formosa Defense Command, 1955.; Commander, Seventh Fleet/U.S. Taiwan Defense Command, 1955.; Commander, Air Force, Pacific Fleet, 1956–1957.; Commander, Naval Air Force, Pacific Fleet, 1957–1959.	(1897–1988); Naval aviator. Retired as admiral, 1 Oct 1959.
177	Thomas G. W. Settle		8 Mar 1954; 12 Feb 1962; 26 Aug 1963	6 Jul 1956; 1 Jul 1963; 10 Oct 1963	4	Commander, Amphibious Force, U.S. Pacific Fleet, 1954–1956.; Member, Gorham Military Pay Study Group, 1962–1963.	(1895–1980)
178	Edmund T. Wooldridge		1 Apr 1954	1 Aug 1958	4	Commander, Second Fleet, 1954–1955.; Commandant, National War College, 1955.; Commandant, National War College/Chairman, Inter-American Defense Board, 1955–1956.; Commandant, National War College, 1956–1958.	(1897–1968) Retired as admiral, 1 Aug 1958.
179	Frederick G. McMahon		1 May 1954	1 Jan 1959	5	Commander, Air Force, Atlantic Fleet, 1954–1956.; Commander, Eastern Sea Frontier/Atlantic Reserve Fleet/U.S. Naval Representative, Military Staff Committee, United Nations, 1956–1958.	(1898–1986); Naval aviator.
180	Austin K. Doyle		1 Jun 1954	1 Aug 1958	4	Chief of Naval Air Training, 1954–1957.; Commander, U.S. Taiwan Defense Command/Chief, Military Assistance Advisory Group, Taiwan, 1957–1958.	(1898–1970); Naval aviator. Retired as admiral, 1 Aug 1958.
181	Murrey L. Royar		2 Oct 1954	1 Feb 1956	1	Chief of Naval Material, 1954–1956.	(1894–1985) Supply Corps.
182	Charles Wellborn Jr.		21 Jun 1955	1 Feb 1963	8	Commander, Second Fleet/Striking Fleet Atlantic, 1955–1957.; Commandant, Armed Forces Staff College, 1957–1960.; Commander, Eastern Sea Frontier/Atlantic Reserve Fleet/U.S. Naval Representative, Military Staff Committee, United Nations/Commandant, Third Naval District/Commander, Naval Base, New York, 1960–1961.; Commander, Eastern Sea Frontier/Atlantic Reserve Fleet/Chairman, U.S. Delegation, Military Staff Committee, United Nations, 1961–1963.	(1901–1988)
183	Maurice E. Curts		24 Jun 1955; 1 Feb 1958	28 Apr 1957; 1 Apr 1960	4	Deputy Commander in Chief/Chief of Staff, Pacific Fleet, 1955–1958.; Commander, Western Sea Frontier/Naval Defense Force, Eastern Pacific, 1958–1960.	(1898–1976) Promoted to admiral, 29 Apr 1957.
184	Herbert G. Hopwood		1 Aug 1955	31 Jan 1958	3	Commander, First Fleet, 1955–1956.; Deputy Chief of Naval Operations (Logistics), 1956–1958.	(1898–1966) Promoted to admiral, 1 Feb 1958.
185	George L. Russell		23 Nov 1955	15 Aug 1957	2	Deputy Chief of Naval Operations (Administration), 1955–1957.	(1900–1978)
186	Stuart H. Ingersoll		19 Dec 1955; 25 Jul 1960	1 Jul 1960; 1 May 1961	5	Commander, Seventh Fleet/U.S. Taiwan Defense Command, 1955–1957.; Commander, U.S. Taiwan Defense Command, 1957.; President, Naval War College, 1957–1960.; Member, Ad Hoc Committee to Study and Revise the Officer Personnel Act of 1947, 1960–1961.	(1898–1983); Naval aviator.
187	Stuart S. Murray		7 Dec 1955	1 Aug 1956	1	Naval Inspector General, 1954–1956.	(1898–1980) Retired as admiral, 1 Aug 1956. Nephew of Oklahoma Governor William H. Murray.
189	Cato D. Glover Jr.		17 Jan 1956	1 Sep 1957	2	Deputy Commander in Chief, Allied Forces Mediterranean, 1956–1957.	(1897–1988); Naval aviator. Retired as admiral, 1 Sep 1957.
190	Charles R. Brown		24 Jan 1956	31 Dec 1958	3	Deputy Commander in Chief, U.S. Atlantic Fleet/Chief of Staff and Aide to the Commander in Chief, Atlantic/U.S. Atlantic Fleet/Western Atlantic, 1956.; Commander, Sixth Fleet, 1956–1959.	(1899–1983); Naval aviator. Promoted to admiral, 1 Jan 1959.
191	Edward W. Clexton		1 Feb 1956	1 Jul 1960	4	Chief of Naval Material, 1956–1960.	(1900–1966) Aeronautical engineering duty officer.
192	James H. Thach Jr.		6 Feb 1956	23 Oct 1956	1	Chief of Staff and Aide to the Supreme Allied Commander Atlantic, 1955–1956.	(1900–1962)
193	Bernard L. Austin		15 Mar 1956; 1 Aug 1964	1 Aug 1964; 17 Oct 1967	12	Director, Joint Staff, 1956–1958.; Commander, Second Fleet, 1958–1959.; Deputy Chief of Naval Operations (Plans and Policy), 1959–1960.; President, Naval War College, 1960–1964.; Chairman, Inter-American Defense Board, 1964–1967.	(1902–1979)
194	Harry D. Felt		12 Apr 1956	31 Aug 1956	0	Commander, Sixth Fleet, 1956.	(1902–1992); Naval aviator. Promoted to admiral, 1 Sep 1956.
195	Ruthven E. Libby		1 May 1956	1 May 1960	4	Deputy Chief of Naval Operations (Fleet Operations and Readiness), 1956.; Deputy Chief of Naval Operations (Plans and Policy), 1956–1958.; Commander, First Fleet, 1958–1960.	(1900–1986)
196	Lorenzo S. Sabin Jr.		1 May 1956	1 Mar 1961	5	Commander, Amphibious Force, U.S. Atlantic Fleet, 1956–1957.; Chief of Staff and Aide to the Supreme Allied Commander Atlantic, 1957–1961.	(1899–1988)
197	William L. Rees		29 May 1956	1 Oct 1960	4	Commander, Air Force, Atlantic Fleet, 1956–1960.	(1900–1989); Naval aviator.
198	Robert L. Dennison		18 Jun 1956	30 Mar 1959	3	Commander, First Fleet, 1956–1958.; Deputy Chief of Naval Operations (Plans and Policy), 1958–1959.	(1901–1980); Naval aviator. Promoted to admiral, 31 Mar 1959.
199	John M. Will		2 Jul 1956	1 Jul 1959	3	Commander, Military Sea Transportation Service, 1956–1959.	(1899–1981) Retired as admiral, 1 Jul 1959.
200	Carl F. Espe		6 Jul 1956	11 Apr 1958	2	Commander, Amphibious Force, U.S. Pacific Fleet, 1956–1958.	(1900–1988)
201	Roscoe H. Hillenkoetter		1 Aug 1956	1 May 1957	1	Naval Inspector General, 1956–1957.	(1897–1982) Director of Central Intelligence, 1947–1950.
202	William V. Davis Jr.		1 Aug 1956	1 Apr 1960	4	Deputy Chief of Naval Operations (Air), 1956–1958.; Deputy Commander in Chief, U.S. Atlantic Fleet/Chief of Staff and Aide to the Commander in Chief, Atlantic/U.S. Atlantic Fleet/Western Atlantic, 1958–1960.	(1902–1981); Naval aviator.
203	Robert Goldthwaite		5 Aug 1956	20 Jun 1963	7	Deputy Commander in Chief/Chief of Staff, U.S. Atlantic Fleet, 1956–1957.; Chief of Naval Air Training, 1957–1961.; Commander, Western Sea Frontier, 1961–1963.	(1903–1979); Naval aviator.
204	Harold Page Smith		24 Oct 1956	17 Feb 1960	3	Chief of Staff and Aide to the Supreme Allied Commander Atlantic, 1956–1957.; Deputy Chief of Naval Operations (Personnel and Naval Reserve)/Chief of Naval Personnel/Chief, Bureau of Naval Personnel, 1958–1960.	(1904–1993) Promoted to admiral, 18 Feb 1960. Uncle of Navy admiral Leighton W. Smith Jr.
205	Wallace M. Beakley		28 Jan 1957	3 Aug 1963	7	Commander, Seventh Fleet, 1957–1958.; Deputy Chief of Naval Operations (Plans and Readiness), 1958.; Deputy Chief of Naval Operations (Fleet Operations and Readiness), 1958–1961.; Deputy Commander in Chief, U.S. Atlantic Fleet/Chief of Staff and Aide to the Commander in Chief, Atlantic/U.S. Atlantic Fleet/Western Atlantic, 1961–1963.	(1903–1975); Naval aviator.
206	George W. Anderson Jr.		1 May 1957; 14 Sep 1959	18 Jan 1958; 31 Jul 1961	3	Chief of Staff/Aide to the Commander in Chief, Pacific Command, 1957–1958.; Commander, Sixth Fleet/Naval Striking and Support Forces, Southern Europe, 1959–1961.	(1906–1992); Naval aviator. Promoted to admiral, 1 Aug 1961. U.S. Ambassador to Portugal, 1963–1966.
207	Robert B. Pirie		3 Jul 1957	1 Nov 1962	5	Commander, Second Fleet, 1957–1958.; Deputy Chief of Naval Operations (Air), 1958–1962.	(1905–1990); Naval aviator.
208	Frank T. Watkins		1 Aug 1957	27 Aug 1958	1	Commander, Anti-Submarine Defense Force, U.S. Atlantic Fleet, 1957–1958.	(1898–1980)
209	John H. Sides		1 Aug 1957	30 Aug 1960	3	Director, Weapons Systems Evaluation Group, 1957–1960.	(1904–1978) Promoted to admiral, 31 Aug 1960.
210	James S. Russell		14 Aug 1957	20 Jul 1958	1	Deputy Commander in Chief, U.S. Atlantic Fleet/Chief of Staff and Aide to the Commander in Chief, Atlantic/U.S. Atlantic Fleet/Western Atlantic, 1957–1958.	(1903–1996); Naval aviator. Promoted to admiral, 21 Jul 1958.
211	Byron H. Hanlon		4 Nov 1957	1 Oct 1958	1	Commander, Amphibious Force, U.S. Atlantic Fleet, 1957–1958.	(1899–1977) Retired as admiral, 1 Oct 1958.
212	Ralph E. Wilson		20 Dec 1957	1 Jul 1960	3	Deputy Chief of Naval Operations (Logistics), 1957–1960.	(1902–1990)
213	Herbert D. Riley		10 Feb 1958	1 Apr 1964	6	Chief of Staff, Pacific Command, 1958–1961.; Deputy Chief of Naval Operations (Fleet Operations and Readiness), 1961–1962.; Director, Joint Staff, 1962–1964.	(1904–1973); Naval aviator.
214	John Sylvester		11 Apr 1958	1 Sep 1964	6	Commander, Amphibious Force, U.S. Pacific Fleet, 1958–1960.; Deputy Chief of Naval Operations (Logistics), 1960–1964.	(1904–1990)
215	Roland N. Smoot		31 Jul 1958	1 Jun 1962	4	Commander, U.S. Taiwan Defense Command/Chief, Military Assistance Advisory Group, Taiwan, 1958–1962.	(1901–1984)
216	William G. Cooper		1 Aug 1958	1 Feb 1960	2	Commander, Anti-Submarine Defense Force, U.S. Atlantic Fleet, 1958–1960.	(1903–1971)
217	Clarence E. Ekstrom		30 Sep 1958	1 Dec 1962	4	Commander, Sixth Fleet, 1958–1959.; Commander, Naval Air Force, U.S. Pacific Fleet, 1959–1962.	(1902–1986); Naval aviator.
218	Frederick N. Kivette		30 Sep 1958	1 Oct 1961	3	Commander, Seventh Fleet, 1958–1960.; Commander, Western Sea Frontier, 1960–1961.	(1902–1975); Naval aviator.
219	George C. Towner		1 Oct 1958	10 Dec 1960	2	Commander, Amphibious Force, U.S. Atlantic Fleet, 1958–1960.	(1901–1999)
220	Hyman G. Rickover		23 Oct 1958; 1 Feb 1964	1 Feb 1964; 15 Nov 1973	15	Director, Naval Reactors Branch, Atomic Energy Commission/Assistant Chief for Nuclear Propulsion, Bureau of Ships, 1955–1964.; Director, Naval Reactors Branch, Atomic Energy Commission/Assistant Chief for Nuclear Propulsion, Bureau of Ships, 1964–1966.; Director, Naval Reactors Branch, Atomic Energy Commission/Deputy Commander for Nuclear Propulsion, Naval Ship Systems Command, 1966–1974.	(1900–1986) Engineering duty officer. Promoted to admiral, 16 Nov 1973. Awarded Presidential Medal of Freedom, 1980; Congressional Gold Medal, 1958 and 1982.
221	William R. Smedberg III		21 Mar 1959	1 Apr 1964	5	Commander, Second Fleet, 1959–1960.; Deputy Chief of Naval Operations (Personnel and Naval Reserve)/Chief of Naval Personnel/Chief, Bureau of Naval Personnel, 1960–1964.	(1902–1994)
222	John T. Hayward		25 Apr 1959; 13 Jun 1963	9 Mar 1962; 1 Sep 1968	8	Deputy Chief of Naval Operations (Development), 1959–1962.; Commander, Anti-Submarine Warfare Force, U.S. Pacific Fleet, 1963–1966.; President, Naval War College, 1966–1968.	(1908–1999); Naval aviator.
223	Roy A. Gano		30 Jun 1959	1 Jul 1964	5	Commander, Military Sea Transportation Service, 1959–1964.	(1902–1971)
*	Burton B. Biggs		6 Aug 1959; 11 Aug 1963	1 Aug 1963; 1 Jan 1964	4	Director, Petroleum Logistics Policy, Office of the Assistant Secretary of Defense (Installations and Logistics), 1959–1963.; Special Assistant to Assistant Secretary of Defense (Installations and Logistics), 1963–1964.	(1898–1967)

== Timeline ==
An officer held the active-duty grade of vice admiral (Vice Adm.) in the U.S. Navy until his death; retirement; resignation; reversion to lower permanent grade upon vacating a position carrying the ex officio rank; or promotion to a higher grade such as admiral (Adm.) or fleet admiral (Fleet Adm.). An officer on the retired list could also be recalled to active duty in the grade of vice admiral (Vice Adm. (ret.)) or admiral (Adm. (ret.)).

Between World War I and World War II, there were three ex officio vice admiral positions. One commanded the battleships of the United States Fleet (BATSHIPS), and a second commanded the Scouting Force (SCOFOR). The third position was successively allocated to command the naval forces in Europe (NAVEUR), the cruisers of the Scouting Force (CRUSCOFOR), and the aircraft carriers of the Battle Force (AIRBATFOR).

== History ==
=== Civil War ===
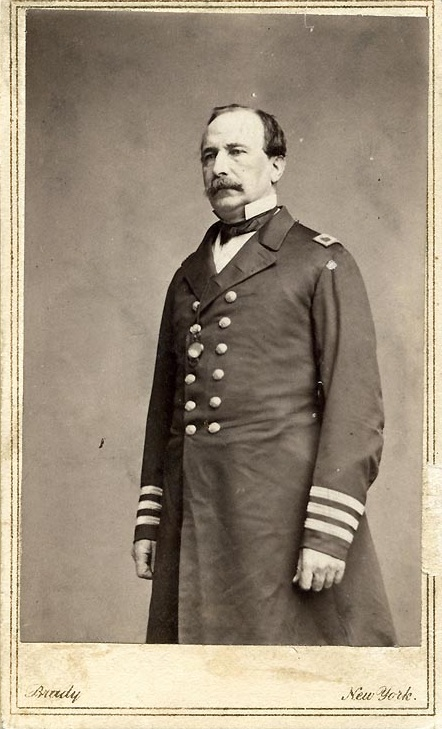
Stephen C. Rowan

The grade of vice admiral in the United States Navy was created by Congress in December 1864 to honor David G. Farragut for his victory at the Battle of Mobile Bay during the American Civil War. The promotion made Farragut the senior officer in the Navy but did not give him command of all naval forces, unlike the corresponding grade of lieutenant general that had been revived for Ulysses S. Grant earlier that year. After the war, Farragut was promoted to admiral and his vacated vice admiralcy was filled by David D. Porter. When Farragut died in 1870, Porter succeeded him as admiral and Stephen C. Rowan became vice admiral. Three years later, Congress stopped further promotions to admiral or vice admiral, and the vice admiral grade expired with Rowan in 1890.

After the Spanish–American War, Congress tried to revive the grade to reward William T. Sampson and Winfield S. Schley for winning the Battle of Santiago de Cuba, but the officers feuded bitterly over credit for the victory and their partisans in the Senate could not agree on who would be the senior vice admiral, so neither was promoted. Even after Sampson died in 1902, his admirers continued to prevent Schley from being promoted, while Schley's friends blocked all moves to elevate any other officer over him during his lifetime, such as an attempt to promote Robley D. Evans to vice admiral on the retired list in 1909. No new vice admirals were created until after Schley's death in 1911.

=== World War I ===
Henry T. Mayo

In 1915, Congress authorized the President to designate the commanders in chief of the Pacific, Atlantic, and Asiatic Fleets to hold the rank of admiral, and their seconds in command the rank of vice admiral. The chief of naval operations (CNO) received the rank of admiral the following year. Because Porter and Rowan had been promoted permanently to vice admiral and then never gone to sea again, Congress made these new ranks strictly ex officio. Upon relinquishing command, an officer lost his designation as admiral or vice admiral and reverted to his permanent grade of rear admiral. The three fleet commanders were immediately made admirals to match the rank of their foreign counterparts, but only the second in command of the Atlantic Fleet, Henry T. Mayo, was designated a vice admiral, since the Pacific and Asiatic Fleets were too small to employ their vice admirals.

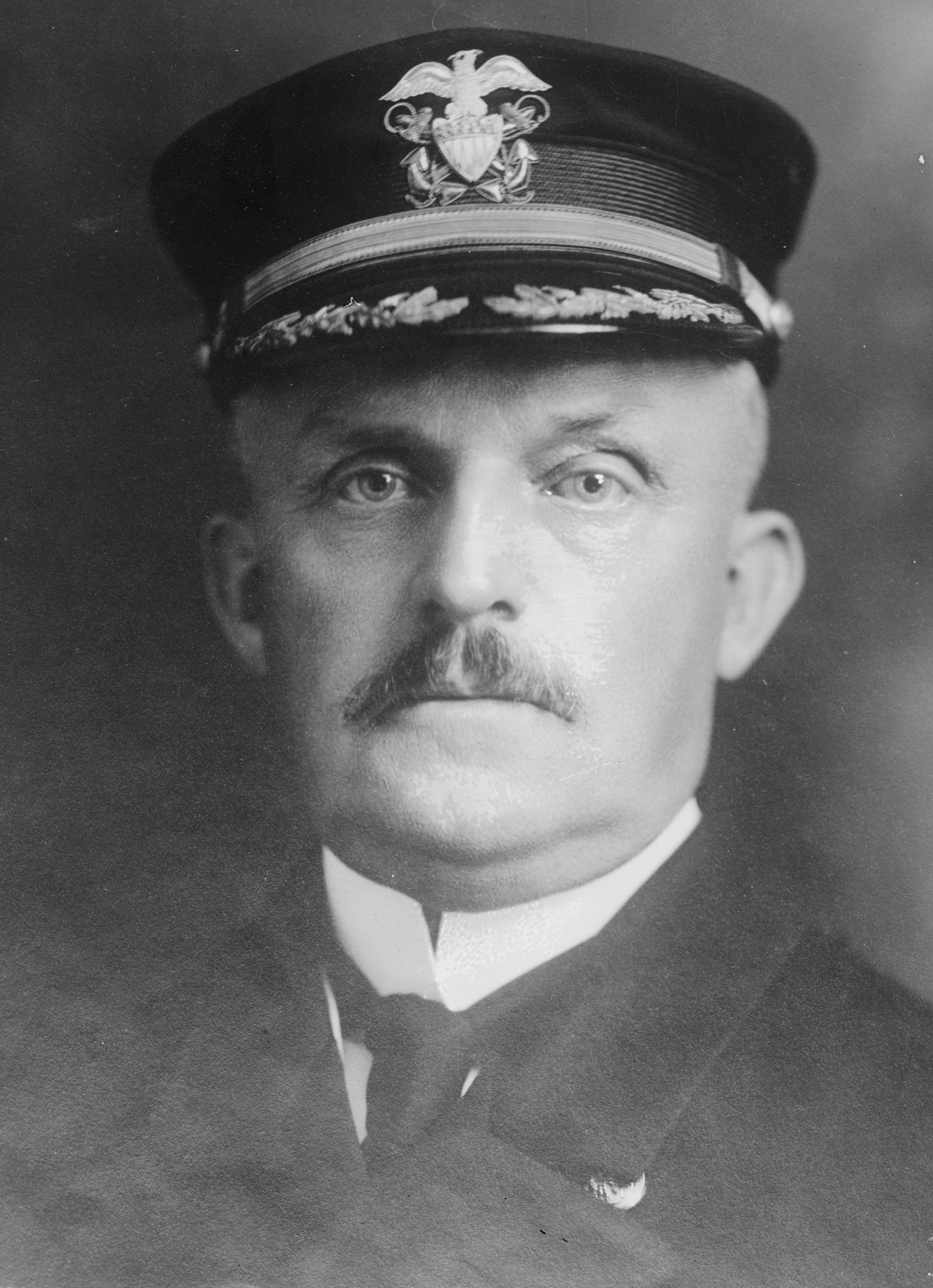
Albert Gleaves

When the United States entered World War I, Congress generalized the law to let the President designate up to six commanders of any fleet or subdivision of a fleet to hold ranks higher than rear admiral, of which up to three could be admirals and the rest vice admirals. This allowed William S. Sims to be designated vice admiral as commander of U.S. Naval Forces in European Waters. The other two vice admiral designations went to the Atlantic Fleet's two battleship force commanders. When the Asiatic Fleet's commander in chief retired in December 1918, his four-star designation was transferred to Sims, whose vacated vice admiralcy went to Albert Gleaves, commander of the Atlantic Fleet's cruiser and transport force. By the end of 1918, all three seagoing admirals and all three vice admirals were assigned to the Atlantic and European theaters, including the four-star commander in chief of the Pacific Fleet, who had taken a force to patrol the South Atlantic Ocean.

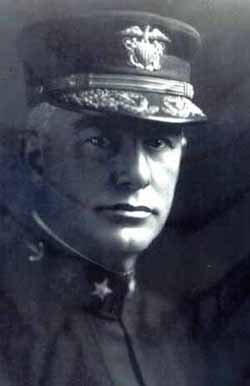
William L. Rodgers

With the end of hostilities in Europe, the six designations for admirals and vice admirals were redistributed in 1919. The commanders in chief of the Atlantic and Pacific Fleets remained admirals. About half of the major ships in the Atlantic Fleet transferred to the Pacific Fleet, which was now large enough to employ a vice admiral to command its battleship force. A second vice admiral commanded the battleship force of the Atlantic Fleet, and a third vice admiral, Gleaves, commanded its cruiser and transport force. The sixth designation returned to the Asiatic Fleet when Sims left his European command, but its commander in chief, William L. Rodgers, was promoted only to vice admiral since Gleaves was already slated to be its admiral, so for a few months there were four vice admirals and only three admirals, including the CNO.

In September 1919, Gleaves was appointed commander in chief of the Asiatic Fleet with the rank of admiral. Rodgers remained vice admiral in command of Division 1 of the Asiatic Fleet until January 1920, so for the first and only time, the Pacific, Atlantic, and Asiatic Fleets each had an admiral and vice admiral, as originally envisioned in 1915.

=== Interwar ===
In 1922 the three fleets were combined into a single United States Fleet with three admirals and three vice admirals. One admiral served as commander in chief of the United States Fleet (CINCUS), a second admiral as commander in chief of the Asiatic Fleet, and the third admiral as commander in chief of the former Pacific Fleet, now the Battle Fleet. A vice admiral commanded the former Atlantic Fleet, now the Scouting Fleet, and a second vice admiral commanded the battleship divisions of the Battle Fleet. The Battle Fleet and Scouting Fleet became the Battle Force and Scouting Force, respectively, when the United States Fleet was reorganized into type commands in 1931. When the Pacific and Atlantic Fleets were reconstituted in February 1941, CINCUS was dual-hatted as commander in chief of the Pacific Fleet (CINCPAC), and the commander in chief of the Atlantic Fleet was made an admiral by downgrading the Battle Force's commander to vice admiral and its battleship commander to rear admiral.

The third vice admiral designation moved from the Asiatic Fleet to the commander of U.S. Naval Forces in European Waters in 1920 and lapsed when the European force was disbanded in 1929. It was revived the next year for the commander of the Scouting Fleet's light cruiser divisions and subsequently the Scouting Force's cruisers, before migrating in 1935 to the commander of the Battle Force's aircraft.

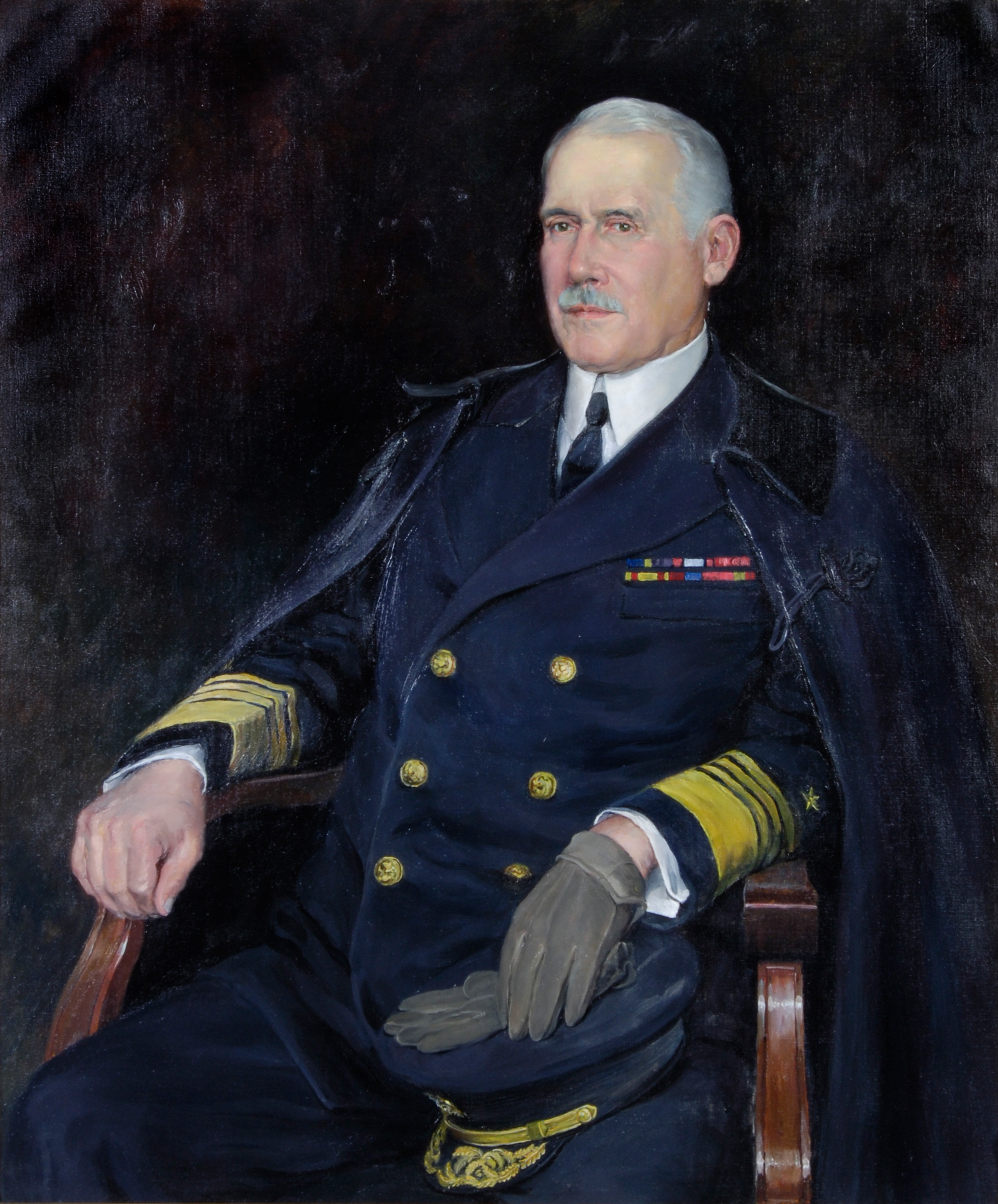
William V. Pratt

A flag officer in the United States Fleet climbed a cursus honorum that nominally began with command of a battleship division as a rear admiral, followed by command of all battleship divisions in the Battle Force as a vice admiral, then command of the entire Battle Force as an admiral, and finally either CINCUS, the highest office afloat, or CNO, the highest office ashore—or both, in the case of William V. Pratt. Upon leaving the fleet, it was normal for a former three- or four-star commander to revert to his permanent grade of rear admiral and remain on active duty until statutory retirement as president of the Naval War College, commandant of a naval district, or member of the General Board.

Since there were four admirals and only three vice admirals, it was not uncommon to skip the rank of vice admiral entirely, especially for commanders in chief of the Asiatic Fleet, which was seen as a four-star consolation prize for flag officers who were out of the running for CINCUS or CNO. By the early 1940s, neither the CNO (Harold R. Stark), CINCUS (Claude C. Bloch, James O. Richardson), nor CINCPAC (Husband E. Kimmel, Chester W. Nimitz) had ever been a vice admiral.

=== World War II ===
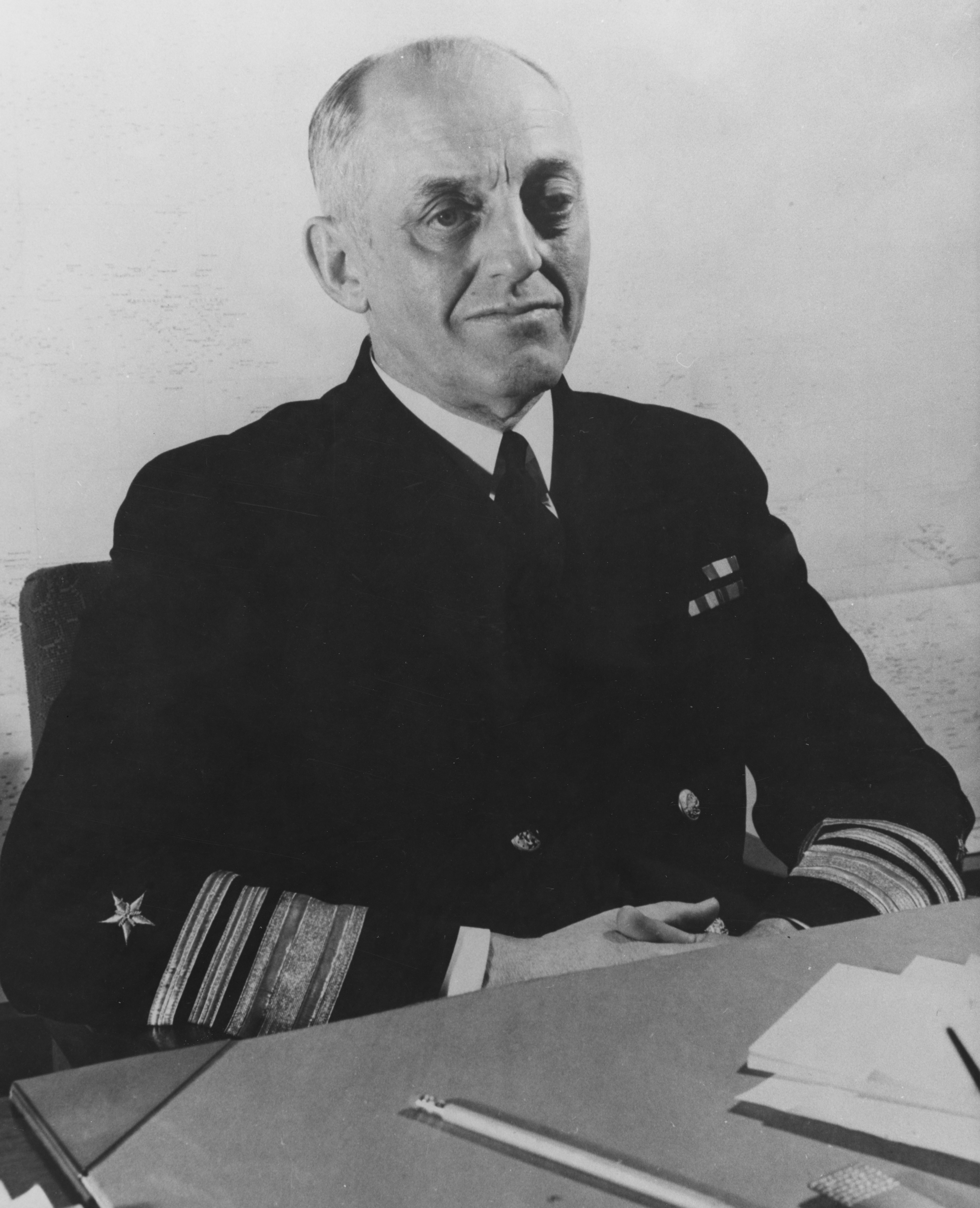
Robert L. Ghormley

In July 1941, Congress authorized the President to designate, at his own discretion, up to nine additional officers to carry the ex officio rank of vice admiral while performing special or unusual duty, for a total of 12 vice admirals in the permanent establishment. The first of the nine new vice admiral designations was assigned to Robert L. Ghormley, then serving as special observer in the U.S. Embassy in London. After the United States entry into World War II in December 1941, the new commander in chief of the Atlantic Fleet, Royal E. Ingersoll, was designated a vice admiral after his predecessor, Ernest J. King, was appointed commander in chief of the United States Fleet (COMINCH, formerly CINCUS) and took the Atlantic Fleet's four-star designation with him. The remaining seven vice admiral slots were quickly filled by the director of the Office of Procurement and Material and the commanders of U.S. Naval Forces, Southwest Pacific; ANZAC Force; the service forces in the Atlantic and Pacific Fleets; and two anti-submarine task forces in the Atlantic Fleet.

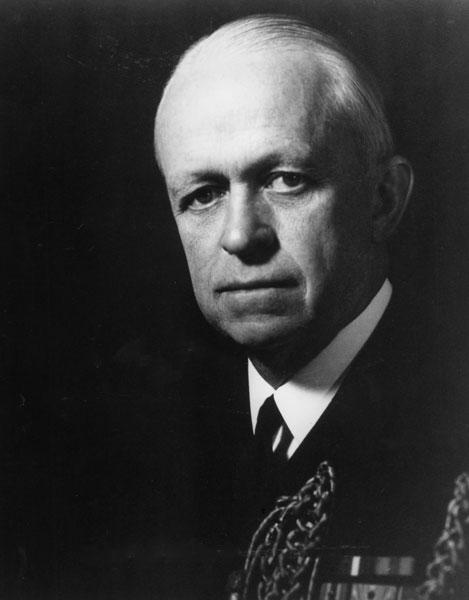
Russell Willson

All 12 vice admiral designations were in use by March 1942, when a headquarters reorganization called for two more vice admirals to be vice chief of naval operations and chief of staff to COMINCH. Frederick J. Horne and Russell Willson were nominated to be temporary vice admirals, under a 1941 statute that authorized an unlimited number of appointments in all grades for temporary service during a national emergency, with temporary flag officers needing confirmation by the Senate. The statute technically created temporary grades only up to rear admiral, but the Senate confirmed Horne and Willson as vice admirals anyway, and continued to confirm temporary admirals and vice admirals when nominated. Dozens of temporary vice admirals were appointed during World War II, either to serve in a specified job or simply for the duration of the national emergency.

=== Postwar ===
The Officer Personnel Act of 1947 consolidated the various laws governing vice admiral appointments. Previously, the President had controlled a pool of 12 vice admiral designations that he could assign at his own discretion. In addition, the Senate could confirm an unlimited number of officers nominated by the President to hold the temporary personal grade of vice admiral, either while serving in a particular job or for the duration of a national emergency. Under the new law, all vice admirals had to be confirmed by the Senate, and held that temporary grade only while serving in a particular job. The maximum number of vice admirals was proportional to the total number of flag officers.

The new law also made any former admiral or vice admiral eligible to retire with that rank, simplifying the hodgepodge of rules that had promoted various classes of retirees piecemeal. Originally every designated admiral and vice admiral retired in his permanent grade of rear admiral. In 1930 Congress promoted officers on the retired list to their highest rank held during World War I, which was defined as having ended on July 2, 1921, so John D. McDonald, who became vice admiral on July 1, 1921, was promoted, but William R. Shoemaker, who became vice admiral only a week later, was not. In 1942 former fleet commanders were allowed to retire as admiral or vice admiral if they had served in that grade for at least a year, a cutoff that John H. Dayton and Walton R. Sexton both missed by about two weeks. Dayton lived long enough to be advanced back to vice admiral by the Officer Personnel Act of 1947, but Sexton did not.

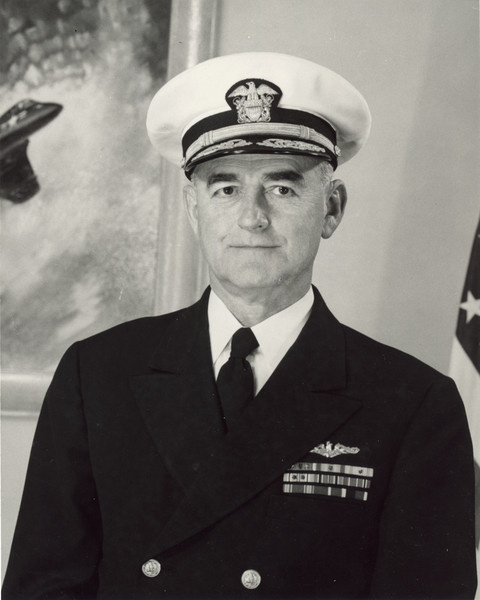
Lynde D. McCormick

Postwar vice admirals typically headed directorates in the Office of the Chief of Naval Operations, numbered fleets, type commands, sea frontiers, senior educational institutions like the National War College and the Naval War College, or other interservice or international positions. Upon completing their capstone assignments, many senior flag officers resumed the prewar pattern of remaining on active duty in a lower grade until statutory retirement, in contrast to Army and Air Force general officers who usually preferred to retire immediately to avoid demotion. For example, Lynde D. McCormick reverted from vice admiral to rear admiral but rose again to vice admiral and admiral before dropping to vice admiral for his final assignment.

=== Tombstone promotions ===
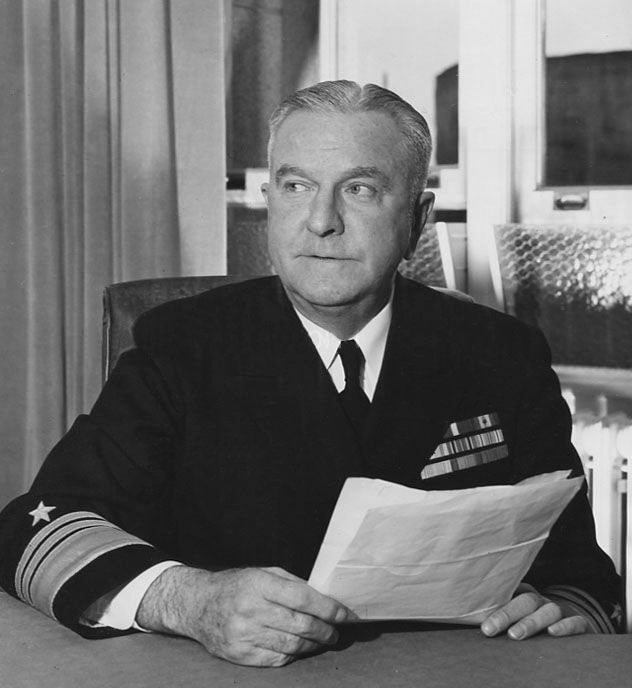
David W. Bagley

In 1925 Congress authorized Navy and Marine Corps officers who had been specially commended for performance of duty in actual combat during World War I to retire with the rank of the next higher grade but not its pay. Such honorary increases in rank at retirement were dubbed tombstone promotions, since their only tangible benefit was the right to carve the higher rank on the officer's tombstone. Later laws expanded eligibility beyond World War I and to officers already on the retired list. Tombstone promotions were limited in 1947 to duty performed before the end of World War II, meaning before January 1, 1947, and halted entirely in 1959. By May 29, 1959, there were 154 vice admirals on the retired list who had never served on active duty in that rank, not counting those already deceased.

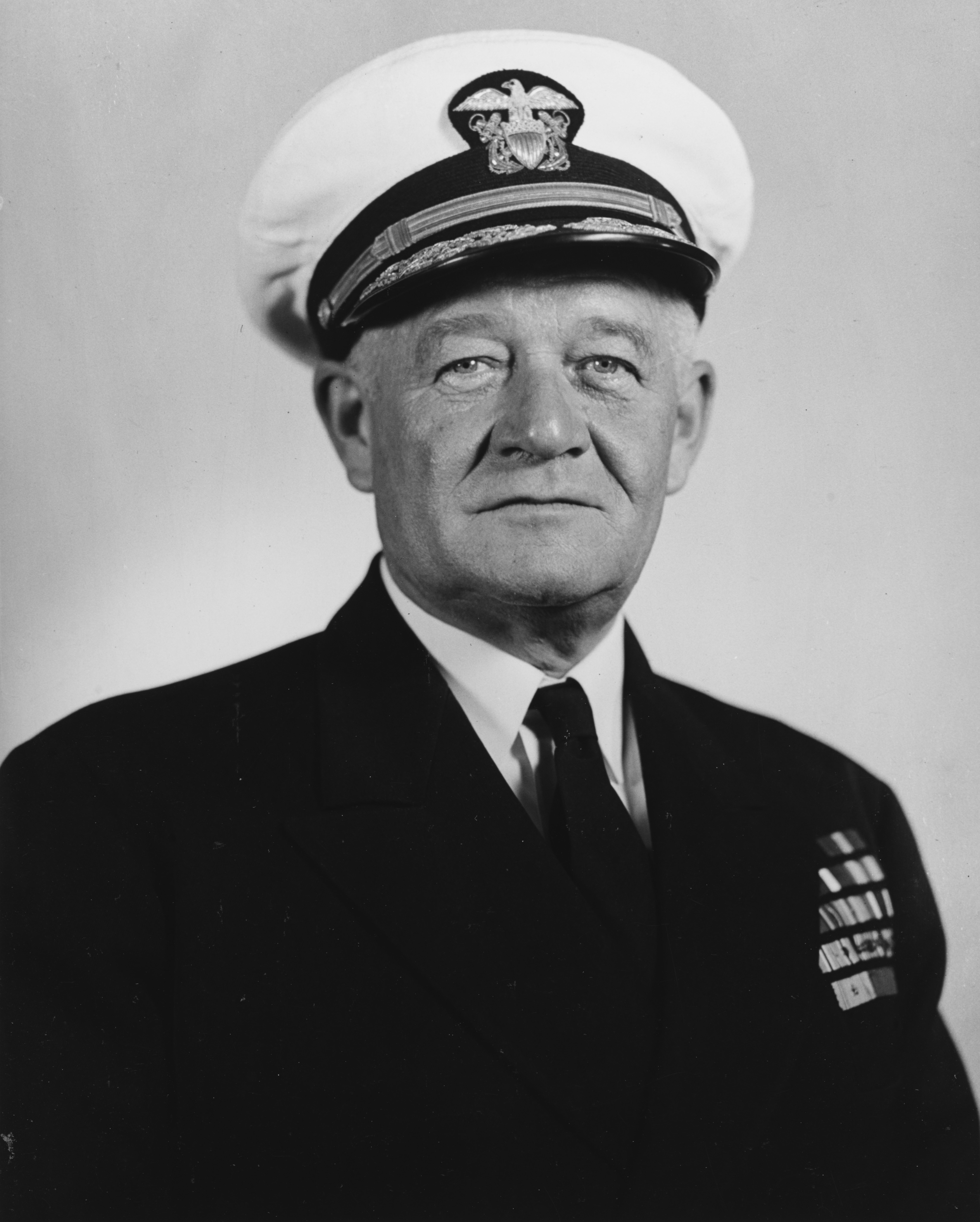
Robert C. Giffen

Dozens of vice admirals received tombstone promotions to admiral. Even if a vice admiral reverted to rear admiral, he could still retire as a vice admiral and then claim a tombstone promotion to admiral, but only if he had satisfactory service in the temporary grade of vice admiral during World War II. For example, Gerald F. Bogan, David W. Bagley, Robert C. Giffen, and Alexander Sharp Jr. all reverted to rear admiral after serving as a vice admiral, and all qualified for a tombstone promotion, but only Bagley was advanced to admiral when he retired.

- Bogan was confirmed by the Senate to be a temporary vice admiral while commanding the First Task Fleet after World War II, but offended the secretary of the Navy during the so-called Revolt of the Admirals and was relieved of his three-star command only three weeks before he was scheduled to retire with a tombstone promotion to admiral. Instead, he reverted to rear admiral and received a tombstone promotion back to vice admiral.
- Bagley was confirmed by the Senate to be a temporary vice admiral while serving in a succession of jobs during World War II, before reverting to rear admiral. He retired in his highest wartime grade of vice admiral and received a tombstone promotion to admiral.
- Giffen was confirmed by the Senate to be a temporary vice admiral while commanding the Caribbean Sea Frontier during World War II, but was reprimanded for misconduct in that role. Having unsatisfactory service as a vice admiral, he retired as a rear admiral and received a tombstone promotion back to vice admiral.
- Sharp was designated by the President to hold the rank of vice admiral while commanding the Service Force, Atlantic Fleet during World War II, but was never confirmed by the Senate to hold the temporary personal grade of vice admiral, unlike Bagley and Giffen. Sharp retired with his highest active-duty rank of vice admiral but was not advanced to admiral because tombstone promotions were based on personal grades, not designated ranks.

== Legislative history ==
The following list of Congressional legislation includes all acts of Congress pertaining to appointments to the grade of vice admiral in the United States Navy before 1960.

Each entry lists an act of Congress, its citation in the United States Statutes at Large, and a summary of the act's relevance.

Legislation	Citation	Summary
Act of December 21, 1864	13 Stat. 420	Authorized appointment of one vice admiral, selected from the list of active rear admirals (David G. Farragut).; Exempted vice admiral from mandatory retirement for age or longevity of service.
Act of July 25, 1866	14 Stat. 222	Authorized one grade of vice admiral (David D. Porter, Stephen C. Rowan).
Act of January 24, 1873	17 Stat. 418	Terminated grade of vice admiral at next vacancy.
Act of December 20, 1886	24 Stat. 351	Authorized Stephen C. Rowan to be retired at full pay after forty years' service.
Act of March 3, 1915	38 Stat. 941	Authorized ex-officio rank of vice admiral for officers designated as second in command of the United States Atlantic Fleet, United States Pacific Fleet, or United States Asiatic Fleet.
Act of May 22, 1917	40 Stat. 89	Authorized ex-officio rank for six officers designated to command fleets or subdivisions of fleets, of whom not more than three to have the rank of admiral and the others to have the rank of vice admiral.
Act of March 4, 1925	43 Stat. 1278	Authorized officers to retire for age with the rank of the next higher grade if specially commended for performance of duty in actual combat during World War I.
Act of June 21, 1930	45 Stat. 793	Authorized promotion on the retired list or posthumously to highest grade held during World War I (Henry T. Mayo, Albert Gleaves, William S. Sims, Henry B. Wilson Jr., Hilary P. Jones, DeWitt Coffman, Albert W. Grant, William L. Rodgers, Clarence S. Williams, Harry M. P. Huse, John D. McDonald).
Act of June 22, 1938	52 Stat. 839	Authorized officers to retire with the highest rank or grade held while serving as Chief of Naval Operations. (William V. Pratt, William H. Standley).
Act of June 23, 1938	52 Stat. 951	Authorized line officers to retire with the rank of the next higher grade if specially commended for performance of duty in actual combat (Arthur P. Fairfield, Alfred W. Johnson, Joseph K. Taussig, Olaf M. Hustvedt).
Act of July 17, 1941	55 Stat. 598	Authorized ex-officio rank of vice admiral for up to nine additional officers designated to perform special or unusual duty, or to command naval units afloat organized for the purpose of performing a special or unusual mission.
Act of July 24, 1941	55 Stat. 603	Authorized temporary appointments to higher ranks or grades during a national emergency, with appointments to rear admiral requiring the advice and consent of the Senate.; Authorized retirement in highest temporary rank held on active duty.
Act of February 23, 1942	56 Stat. 120	Authorized line officers retired prior to June 23, 1938, and staff officers retired on or after that date to be advanced on the retired list to the rank of the next higher grade if specially commended for performance of duty in actual combat (Joseph M. Reeves, Harry E. Yarnell).
Act of June 16, 1942	56 Stat. 370	Authorized officers retired while commanding a fleet or fleet subdivision in the rank of admiral or vice admiral, or who served as such commander for one year or more, to retire in the highest grade held while on the active list (Newton A. McCully, Josiah S. McKean, Guy H. Burrage, Thomas T. Craven, Henry V. Butler).
Act of July 1, 1944 [Private Law 348]	58 Stat. 1011	Authorized Emory S. Land to be advanced to naval constructor with the rank of vice admiral on the retired list.
Act of February 21, 1946	60 Stat. 28	Authorized officers to be placed on the retired list with the rank and three-fourths of the active-duty pay of the highest temporary grade in which they served satisfactorily on or before June 30, 1946.
Act of August 7, 1947 [Officer Personnel Act of 1947]	61 Stat. 886	Authorized temporary grade of vice admiral, subject to the advice and consent of the Senate, for officers on the active list designated for the command of fleets or fleet subdivisions, for the command of naval units afloat organized for the purpose of performing a special or unusual mission, or for the performance of any duty of great importance and responsibility.; Assigned temporary grade of vice admiral, subject to the advice and consent of the Senate, to one officer designated as senior member of the Military and Naval Staff Committee of the United Nations.; Capped total positions with temporary grades above rear admiral at 15 percent of the total number of line officers serving above the grade of captain, of whom not more than eight to have the rank of admiral.; Capped total line officers above grade of rear admiral at 26, of whom not more than four to have the rank of admiral.; Exempted from caps a naval officer serving as Chief of Staff to the President.; Authorized retirement in highest grade held while on the active list.; Authorized previously retired officers who served in the rank of admiral or vice admiral to be advanced to that grade on the retired list.; Authorized all officers to retire with the rank of the next higher grade if specially commended for performance of duty in actual combat on or before December 31, 1946 (Burton B. Biggs).
Act of October 12, 1949 [Career Compensation Act of 1949]	63 Stat. 806	Established pay grade O-8 for admiral, vice admiral, and rear admiral.
Act of May 5, 1954 [Officer Grade Limitation Act of 1954]	68 Stat. 65	Capped total number of flag officers as a function of total commissioned officer strength.
Act of May 20, 1958	72 Stat. 124	Established pay grade O-9 for vice admiral.
Act of August 11, 1959	73 Stat. 337	Repealed authorization for officers to retire with the rank of the next higher grade if specially commended for performance of duty in actual combat.

== See also ==
- Vice admiral (United States)
- List of lieutenant generals in the United States Army before 1960
- List of lieutenant generals in the United States Air Force before 1960
- List of United States Marine Corps lieutenant generals on active duty before 1960
- List of United States Navy tombstone vice admirals
- List of United States Navy vice admirals from 2010 to 2019
- List of United States Navy vice admirals since 2020
- List of United States Navy four-star admirals
