= United States Eighth Fleet =

Numbered fleet of the United States Navy

The United States Eighth Fleet was a numbered fleet of the United States Navy established 15 March 1943 from Northwest African Force. It operated in the Mediterranean Sea during World War II with a main mission of amphibious warfare, and then was active in 1946–47 as the heavy striking arm of the United States Atlantic Fleet.

== History ==
In 1941, the forces that eventually evolved into the Eighth Fleet were designated Amphibious Forces, Atlantic Fleet, under the command of Admiral Henry Kent Hewitt, who took command in April 1942. This force, also called Task Force 34, became the U.S. component of the Operation Torch landings in November 1942. The force was then renamed U.S. Naval Forces, Northwest Africa Waters or COMNAVNAW. On 1 February 1946, U.S. Naval Forces, Northwest African Waters, were redesignated U.S. Naval Forces, Mediterranean, which later became the United States Sixth Fleet.

Still under Hewitt's command, the renamed Eighth Fleet supported the landings in Sicily, Operation Husky, and at Salerno, Operation Avalanche, the first sustained land assault and invasion of the European mainland in World War II. Eighth Fleet then supported the August 1944 landing of Allied troops on the coast of southern France, Operation Dragoon, with heavy naval gunfire and naval air attacks. Hewitt remained as the fleet commander until 1945, when he moved on to chair a Pearl Harbor investigation. The fleet was disbanded on 15 September 1945, with its forces becoming part of United States Twelfth Fleet.

With the reorganization of the Navy after World War II in December 1945, Eighth Fleet was reactivated on 1 March 1946 under the command of Admiral Marc A. Mitscher. Under the overall command of Commander, U.S. Atlantic Fleet, Eighth Fleet was the heavy striking arm of the Atlantic Fleet. It consisted of the preponderance of Atlantic Fleet aircraft carrier assets, initially including the new fast carriers Midway and Franklin D. Roosevelt, and their escorts and support ships. These latter did not include the fast Battleship Division made up of USS Wisconsin and Missouri, retained under direct command of Atlantic Fleet. In January 1947, the US Eighth Fleet was redesignated as the Second Task Fleet, a part of the Atlantic Fleet.

== See also ==
- Western Naval Task Force
- Task Force 80

== Sources ==
- Federation of American Scientists, Eighth Fleet, accessed May 2008
