= ComMinLant =

The Commander Minesweeping Forces, Atlantic Fleet. or ComMinLant, also seen as COMMINLANT, was a U.S. Navy type commands, directing minesweepers.

ComMinLant was activated on 1 January 1946 as an organization to command and control U.S. Navy minesweepers, and their activities, while assigned to the Atlantic Ocean. The Commander, Mine Forces, Atlantic was responsible for all minecraft operations in the Atlantic Ocean. Minesweeper forces under the command of ComMinLant are known as MinLant or MINLANT. Units under his command were divided into Minesweeping Squadrons (MinRon)s.

Rear Admiral Emmett P. Bonner commanded Cruiser-Destroyer Flotilla 6 from 1967 to 1968, homeported in Charleston. His flagship was USS Leahy DLG-16; he served concurrently as COMMINELANT homeported in Charleston.

The organization was merged into Commander, Naval Surface Force Atlantic on 1 July 1975.
