= ComBatPac =

The Commander, Battleship Force, Pacific Fleet (COMBATPAC) was the title, from 1922 to 1944, of the United States Navy officer who commanded the battleships of the larger United States Battle Fleet in the Pacific (Commander, Battleships, Pacific).

When formed in 1922, the Battle Fleet (renamed Battle Force in 1930 and Pacific Fleet in 1941), included various type commands. The battleship type was led by the COMBATPAC, generally a three-star vice admiral or two-star rear admiral. The COMBATPAC had five rear admirals (lower half) reporting to him, each leading a Battleship Division of four ships.

In late 1944, the battleships was reorganized into two type commands, each led by a vice admiral. Battleships Squadron One consisted of the Old Battleships, while Battleship Squadron Two consisted of the Fast Battleships.

== Commanders ==
Former Commanders, Battleships, Battle Fleet (Commander, Battleship Divisions, Battle Fleet)

- Vice Admiral William R. Shoemaker, USN (1922)
- Vice Admiral Henry A. Wiley, USN (20 June 1923 - 26 August 1925)
- Vice Admiral Richard H. Jackson, USN (5 October 1925 - 4 September 1926)
- Vice Admiral Louis R. de Steiguer, USN (1926-1927)
- Vice Admiral William V. Pratt, USN (1927-1928)
- Vice Admiral Louis M. Nulton, USN (26 June 1928 - 21 May 1929)
- Vice Admiral Lucius A. Bostwick, USN (May 1929 - May 1930)

Former Commanders, Battleships, Battle Force

- Vice Admiral Richard H. Leigh, USN (May 1930-1931)
- Vice Admiral Luke McNamee, USN (1931-1932)
- Vice Admiral David F. Sellers, USN (1932-1933)
- Vice Admiral Joseph M. Reeves, USN (June 1933- 1 July 1933)
- Vice Admiral Walton R. Sexton, USN (1934)
- Vice Admiral William D. Leahy, USN (1935-1936)
- Vice Admiral Clarence S. Kempff, USN (30 March 1936 - 2 January 1937)
- Vice Admiral Edward C. Kalbfus, USN (2 January 1937 - 29 January 1938)
- Vice Admiral John W. Greenslade, USN (29 January 1938 to 20 May 1939)
- Vice Admiral Charles P. Snyder (admiral), USN (1939 - January 1940)
- Vice Admiral William S. Pye, USN (January 1940 - January 1941)
- Rear Admiral Walter S. Anderson, USN (January 1941 - 10 April 1942)

Former Commanders, Battleships, Pacific Fleet

- Rear Admiral Walter S. Anderson, USN (10 April 1942 - 28 September 1942)
- Vice Admiral Herbert Fairfax Leary, USN (28 September 1942 - 16 April 1943)
- Vice Admiral Willis Augustus Lee, USN (16 April 1943 - 15 December 1944)

Former Commanders, Battleship Squadrons, Pacific Fleet

Squadron One

- Vice Admiral Jesse B. Oldendorf, USN (15 December 1944 - 2 September 1945)

Squadron Two

- Vice Admiral Willis A. Lee, USN (15 December 1944 - 25 August 1945)
- Rear Admiral John F. Shafroth Jr., USN (25 August 1945 - 2 September 1945)

== See also ==
- Battleships in World War II
- History of United States Naval Operations in World War II
- Further information on Battleship Divisions (BatDiv)
