= DeWitt Coffman =

United States Navy admiral (1854–1932)

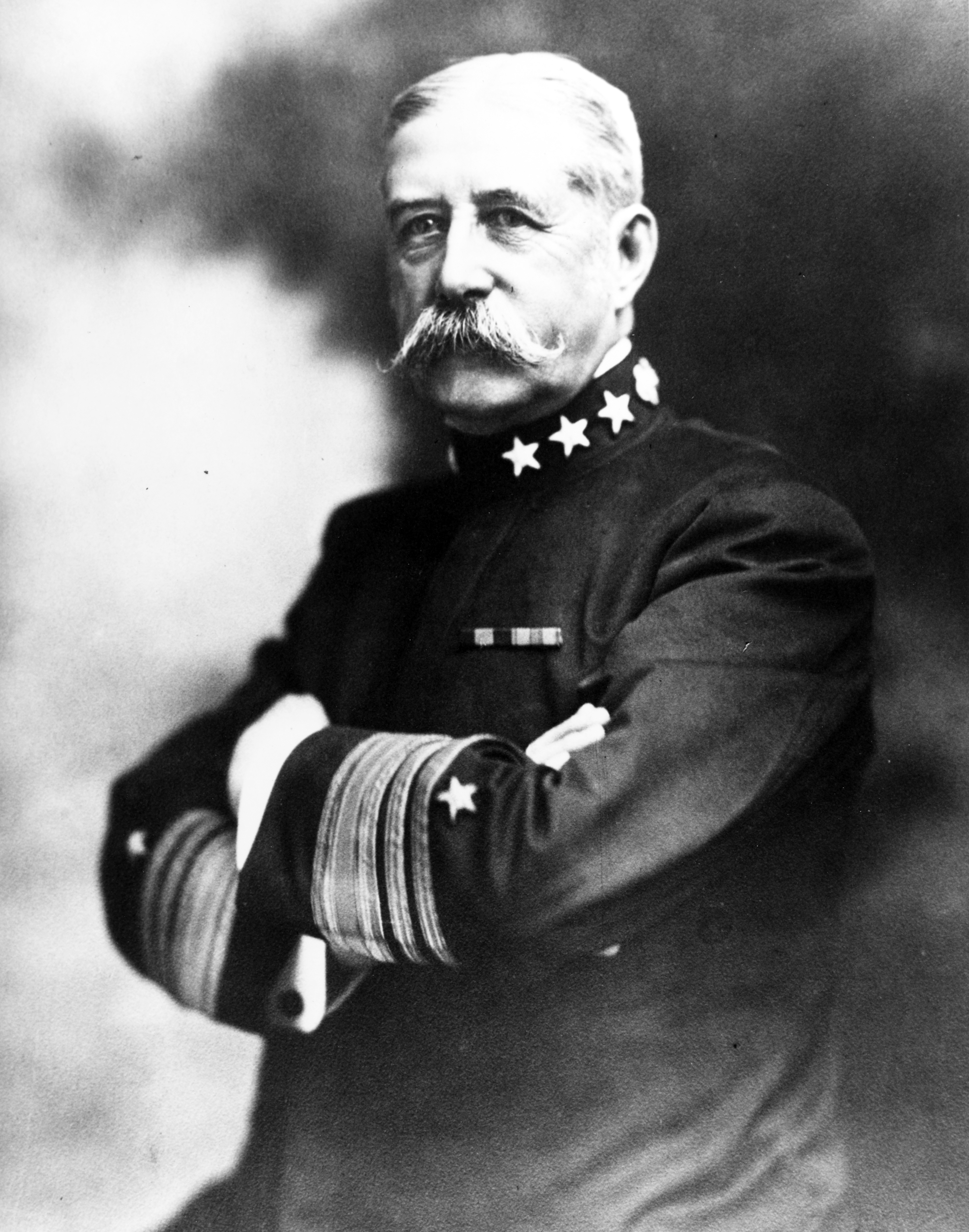
- Coffman, c. 1916–1918
- Born: DeWitt Clinton Coffman; November 28, 1854; Mount Jackson, Virginia
- Died: June 27, 1932 (aged 77); Jamestown, Rhode Island
- Military career
- Allegiance: United States of America
- Branch: United States Navy
- Service years: 1876–1918
- Rank: Vice Admiral
- Conflicts: Spanish–American War; World War I
- Awards: Distinguished Service Medal

DeWitt Clinton Coffman (November 28, 1854 – June 27, 1932) was a United States Navy admiral. He served in the Spanish–American War and World War I.

== Life and career ==
Coffman was born at Mount Jackson, Virginia on November 28, 1854. He graduated from the U.S. Naval Academy on June 20, 1876. Coffman later attended the Naval War College in 1901.

Coffman served in monitor Terror during the Spanish–American War, and received the Distinguished Service Medal as Commander, Battleship Force 2, Atlantic Fleet, during World War I.

He retired as Rear Admiral on November 28, 1918, and was advanced to Vice Admiral on the retired list on June 21, 1930. He died at Jamestown, Rhode Island, on June 27, 1932.

== Namesakes ==
U.S. Navy Lieutenant Commander A. S. Snow named Coffman Cove in Alaska after Coffman in 1886.

The U.S. Navy destroyer escort USS Coffman (DE-191), launched in 1943, was named in Coffman's honor.

== Gallery ==
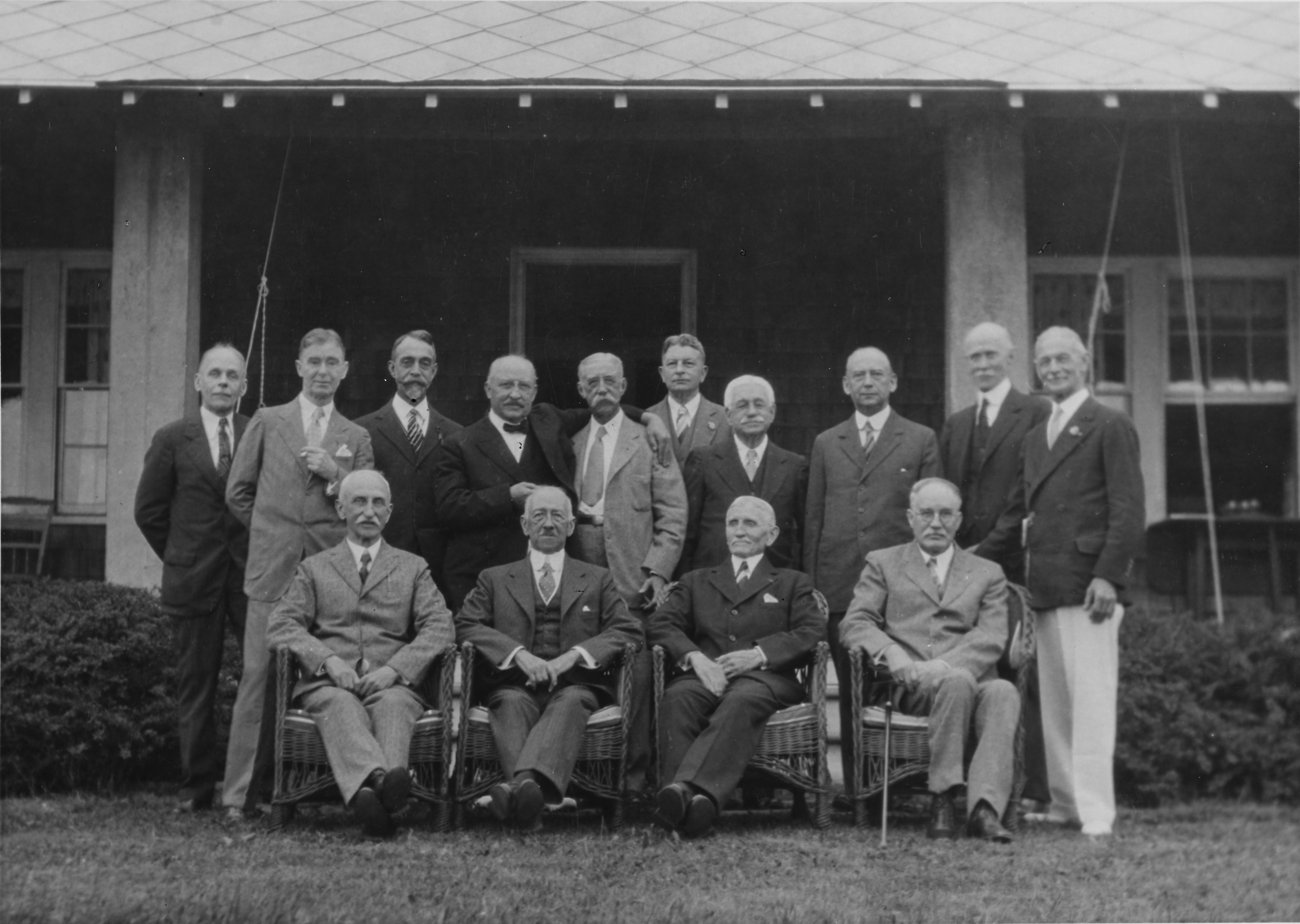
Coffman is standing fifth from the left in this 7 August 1928 photograph of retired U.S. Navy rear admirals and other retirees at Rear Admiral Spencer S. Wood's home in Jamestown, Rhode Island.
