= BatDiv =

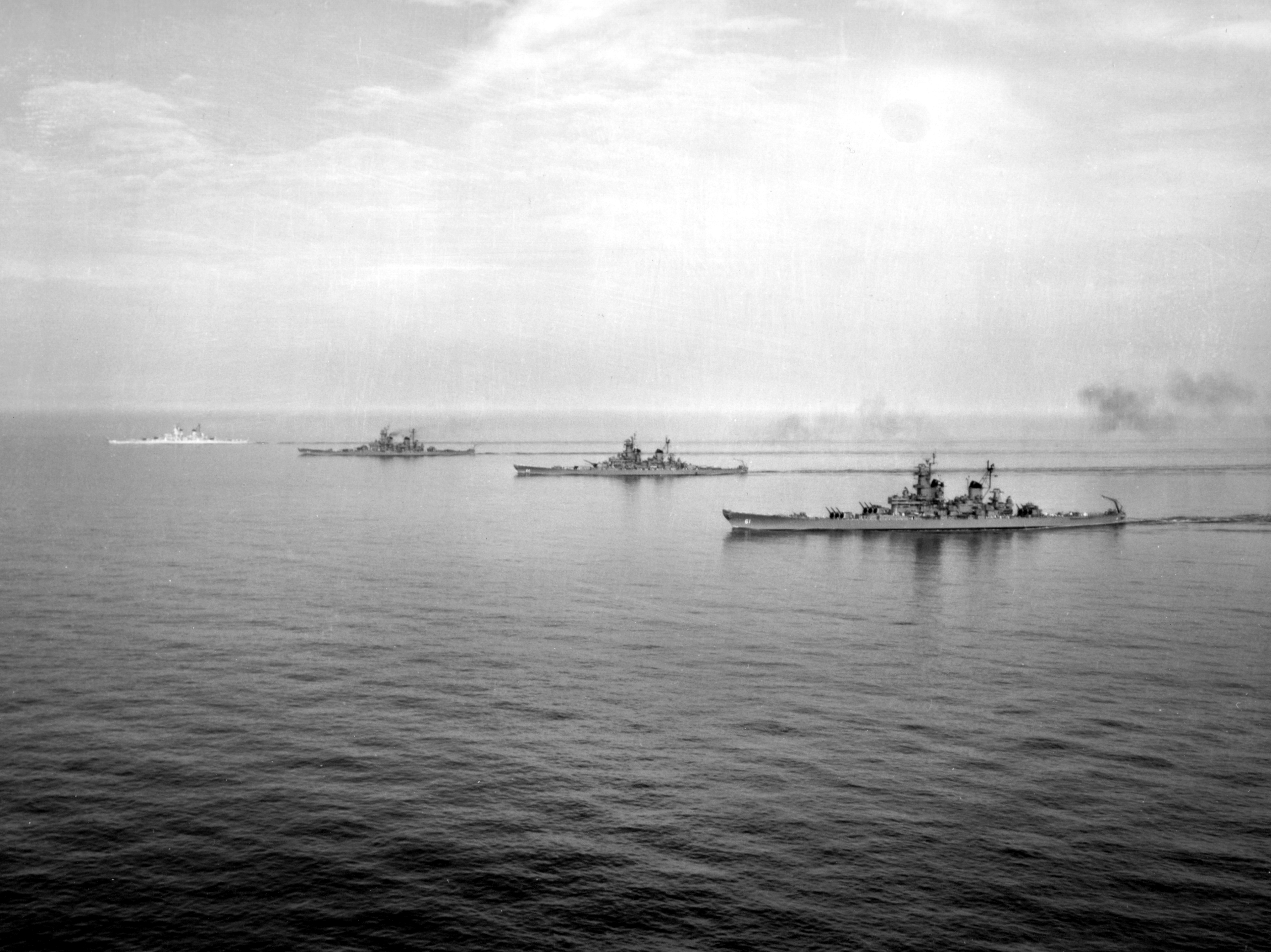
The four Iowa-class ships operating as Battleship Division 2 off the Virginia Capes in 1954; from front to back is Iowa, Wisconsin, Missouri and New Jersey

A BatDiv or BATDIV was a standard U.S. Navy abbreviation or acronym for "battleship division". The commander of a Battleship Division was known, in official Navy communications, as COMBATDIV (followed by a number), such as COMBATDIV ONE.

== World War I and prior ==
BatDivs existed from at least 1913, when there were four Battleship Divisions in the US Atlantic Fleet.

By April 1917, with the American entry into World War I, there were at least nine Battleship Divisions, as BatDiv 9 was dispatched to operate with the Royal Navy's Grand Fleet.

== Inter-War period ==
Before the Second World War, the U.S. Navy battleship force was organized into five Battleship Divisions of three battleships each. Only two of these BATDIVs were composed of three battleships of the same class, but mixing battleships of separate two-ship classes to form three-ship BATDIVs was facilitated by the "Standard type battleship" concept of the US Navy, a design concept developed before 1922 calling for uniform top speed of 21 knots (39 km/h) and a tight tactical radius of 700 yards (640 m) for all battleships of the Nevada, Pennsylvania, New Mexico, Tennessee and Colorado classes.

- Battleship Division 1
  - USS Pennsylvania
  - USS Arizona
  - USS Nevada
- Battleship Division 2
  - USS Tennessee
  - USS California
  - USS Oklahoma
- Battleship Division 3
  - USS New Mexico
  - USS Mississippi
  - USS Idaho
- Battleship Division 4
  - USS Colorado
  - USS Maryland
  - USS West Virginia
- Battleship Division 5
  - USS New York
  - USS Texas
  - USS Arkansas

Stationed at Pearl Harbor as part of the U.S. Pacific Fleet were three battleship divisions; BatDiv 1, 2 and 4. These nine battleships were intended to counterbalance the ten capital ships of the Imperial Japanese Navy. At the time of the Pearl Harbor Attack, Pennsylvania was in dry dock and Colorado was being refitted at Bremerton Navy Yard, Washington. Arizona was mated with Nevada and Oklahoma at that time.

The U.S. Atlantic Fleet contained BatDiv 3 and 5. BatDiv3 had been part of the Pacific Fleet until 20 May 1941 when its three ships were transferred to the Atlantic Fleet for Neutrality Patrol duty. BatDiv 5 was a training division consisting of three older battleships. An additional BATDIV (BatDiv 6) was attached to the Atlantic Fleet during 1941; this consisted of the new battleships North Carolina and Washington, both of which were in the process of undergoing post-commissioning work up.

== World War II and beyond ==
After the Pearl Harbor attack, the BATDIV was replaced by the Task Group (TG) as the operational wartime unit. However, the BATDIV remained the administrative unit for purposes of personnel, training, maintenance and the like. Moreover, a Battleship Division could function in the operational chain of command, for example at the Battle of Surigao Strait, where BATDIV FOUR (Maryland, Mississippi and West Virginia) and BATDIV TWO (Pennsylvania, Tennessee and California) operated as units under BATFOR (Battleship Force) SEVENTH FLEET; Commander, Battle Force (COMBATFOR) Rear Admiral Oldendorf, was overall commander of the Surigao force (Task Group 77.2).

Battleship Division 1 was active in the Pacific at least until 1946, according to U.S. Navy records with the National Archives and Records Administration. On June 7, 1954, under the direction of Battleship Division 2, Norfolk, Virginia, the four battleships of the Iowa class operated together for the only time under the flag of RAdm George R. Cooper.

On January 15, 1957, Wisconsin reported to Commander Fleet Training Group, Guantanano Bay, Cuba and Rear Admiral Henry Crommelin, Commander Battleship Division Two broke his flag in Wisconsin. On May 27, 1957 Rear Admiral Lewis S. Parks relieved Rear Admiral Crommelin as Commander Battleship Division Two.

== See also ==
- ComBatPac, Commander, Battleships, U.S. Pacific Fleet
- Carrier battle group#Battleship battle group
