= ComPhibPac =

ComPhibPac, also seen as COMPHIBPAC, was the official U.S. Navy abbreviation for "Commander, Amphibious Forces, US Pacific Fleet."

Amphibious forces under the command of ComPhibPac were known as PhibPac or PHIBPAC. One of PhibPac's subordinate commands during World War II was Transports, Amphibious Force, Pacific Fleet, or TransPhibPac. The commander of TransPhibPac was known as ComTransPhibPac.

In October 1945, Rear Admiral John L. Hall Jr. became commander of Amphibious Force, Pacific Fleet, receiving the rank of vice admiral a few months later.

Rear Admiral Arthur Dewey Struble commanded PhibPac in 1946–48.

From 1953 to 1954, during the Korean War, Vice-Admiral William M. Callaghan commanded Amphibious Forces, Pacific Fleet.

This office was disestablished in 1975 and its functions were passed on to Commander, Naval Surface Forces Pacific.
