= Walter Stratton Anderson =

United States Navy admiral

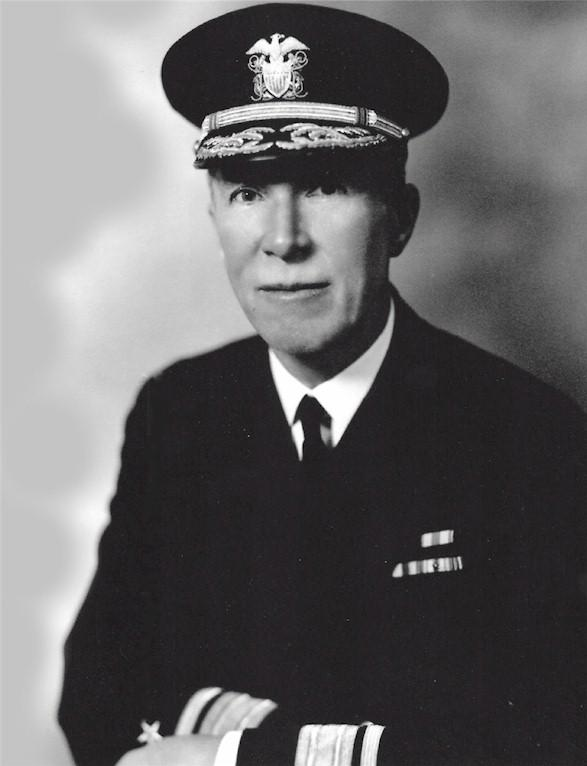
- Born: October 4, 1881; Carlinville, Illinois, US
- Died: October 24, 1981 (aged 100)
- Burial place: Arlington National Cemetery
- Military career
- Allegiance: United States of America
- Branch: United States Navy
- Service years: 1903–1946
- Rank: Vice admiral
- Service number: 0-1827
- Commands: USS Yankton; USS Sinclair; USS Kidder; USS West Virginia; Cruiser Division 4, Scouting Force; Battleships, Pacific Fleet & Battleship Division 4 Gulf Sea Frontier & Seventh Naval District
- Conflicts: World War I World War II
- Awards: Legion of Merit; Navy and Marine Corps Medal

Walter Stratton Anderson (October 4, 1881 – October 24, 1981) was a Vice Admiral of the United States Navy, who served as the Executive officer of USS Arizona in World War I and as Commander Battleships, Battle Force in the Pacific Fleet, and of the Gulf Sea Frontier, during World War II.

== Biography ==
Anderson, the son of William E. P. Anderson and Nellie Douglas Hamilton, was born on October 4, 1881, in Carlinville, Illinois. He graduated from the United States Naval Academy "with distinction" in 1903. As part of his required sea service as a midshipman, he served on board USS Brooklyn, flagship of the European Squadron. On February 3, 1905, he was commissioned ensign.

=== Early career ===
In June 1905, Anderson was ordered to USS Galveston. On board Galveston Anderson sailed to France as part of the squadron under the command of Rear Admiral Charles Dwight Sigsbee, USN, to retrieve the body of John Paul Jones for interment in the crypt under the Naval Academy Chapel. On that occasion, Anderson commanded Galveston's company in the battalion sent to Paris from the United States ships.

From December 1905 until May 1907, Anderson enrolled in postgraduate instruction in ordnance at the Washington Navy Yard, and at the plants of various private industries. Following his completion of the program, he was ordered to Asiatic Station as an aide and flag secretary to Rear Admiral Joseph N. Hemphill, USN, Commander, Third Squadron, Pacific Fleet. From August to November 1908 he served as aide on the staff of Rear Admiral B. Harbor, USN. He joined USS Nebraska at Manila, Philippine Islands in November 1908, and made the remainder of the cruise around the world with the Great White Fleet. In November 1909, he was ordered to the Naval Torpedo Station, Newport, Rhode Island, to work with torpedoes, mines, explosives, and organize the planning and stock records departments for a period of two years.

In December 1911, Anderson (then in the grade of lieutenant) assumed command of USS Yankton, the Commander in Chief's dispatch boat and small relief flagship. From April 1912 to January 1913, he served as aide and flag lieutenant on the staff of Rear Admiral Hugh Osterhaus, USN, Commander in Chief, Atlantic Fleet. He then served on board USS Utah from December 1912 to June 1913. Following that assignment, Anderson served in USS Des Moines from June 1913 to December 1914, seeing action in Santo Domingo and also at the occupation of Vera Cruz. Anderson then returned to New York to serve as Ordnance Superintendent in the Navy Yard. His responsibilities included supervision of ordnance work on all classes of ships, including the installation on battleships of the earliest director fire systems.

=== World War I ===
In May 1916, Anderson's orders were in connection with fitting out USS Arizona. He served on board Arizona from her commissioning in October 1916 until November 1919, first as Gunnery Officer, later as executive officer. While serving in Arizona, he cruised out to sea from Portland, England, in November 1918 to meet USS George Washington, then carrying President Woodrow Wilson, and escorted that transport to Brest, France.

=== Inter-war period ===
Arizona toured European waters in the spring of 1919, visiting Smyrna, Asia Minor, and Constantinople (the first visit of the United States battleship to that city). On that cruise, Anderson was present when the Greeks took Smyrna.

Anderson served as Officer in Charge of the Navy Recruiting Bureau, New York, New York, from November 1919 until November 1920. The function of this large printing establishment, moving picture, and photographic exchange was to publicize the Navy and inspire large numbers of needed enlistments following World War I's demobilization. Following that term of duty, Anderson enrolled in the senior course at the Naval War College in Newport, Rhode Island.

From 1922 until 1924, Anderson held command of USS Sinclair and later USS Kidder, with duty also as Commander, Divisions 30 and 34, Destroyer Squadrons, Pacific Fleet. From July 1924 until July 1927, Anderson acted as head of the Department of Ordnance and Gunnery at the Naval Academy, Annapolis, Maryland. Additionally, he organized the first of all Naval Reserve Officer's Training Corps Units at St. John's College, Annapolis, Maryland.

Anderson served as assistant chief of staff and operations officer to Admiral H. A. Wiley, USN, Commander in Chief, U.S. Fleet, from August 1927 until May 1929 after a short assignment on board USS Texas. On May 31, 1929, Anderson assumed the position of Supervisor of New York Harbor until May 23, 1930. He then served as Officer in Charge of the Naval Ammunition Depot, Hingham, Massachusetts, from May 1930 until January 1932.

Anderson commanded USS West Virginia from January 1932 until April 1933. West Virginia won the battle efficiency pennant for the entirety of his command, a record that stands unique for a battleship and for a captain.

Anderson served as Naval Attaché at the American Embassy, London, England, from March 1934 until February 1937. During the term of that duty he was promoted to rear admiral in July 1936. His assignment in London saw the 25th Anniversary Jubilee of George V, the death of George V, the abdication of Edward VIII, and the London Naval Conference 1935. Anderson attended the conference as a member of the American Delegation. Upon his return to the United States, he assumed command of (heavy) Cruiser Division 4, Scouting Force, with USS Northampton as his flagship. In that command, Anderson became the first flag officer of the U.S. Navy to visit Bogotá, Colombia. He received the thanks of the Colombian government for services rendered upon that occasion.

=== World War II ===
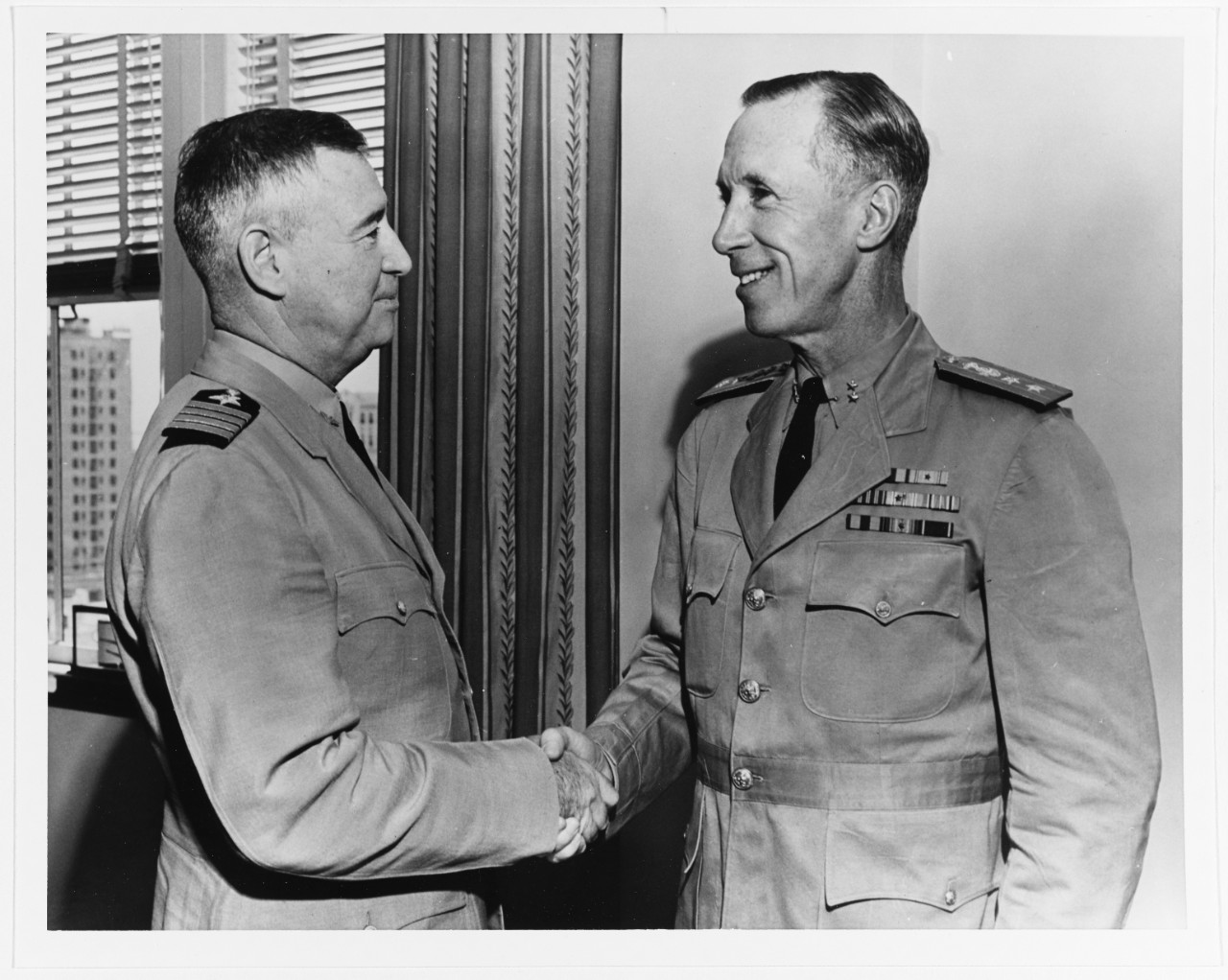
Anderson (right) is greeted by chief of staff of Gulf Sea Frontier, Captain Howard H. J. Benson in July 1944.

From June 1939 until December 1940, Anderson acted as Director of the Office of Naval Intelligence, Navy Department, Washington, D.C. While in that detail he greatly enlarged the Naval Intelligence Service in preparation for war. He also reported personally and daily to President Franklin D. Roosevelt for a considerable period and served, by the President's order, as a member of a special intelligence committee along with the Director of Military Intelligence and the Director of the Federal Bureau of Investigation.

In January 1941, Anderson assumed command of Battleships, Battle Force, and also performed additional duty as Commander, Battleship Division 4. In April 1941 the designation of that command was changed to Battleships, Pacific Fleet (ComBatPac), and additional duty as Commander, Battleship Division 4. Flying his flag on board USS Maryland, he was present at Pearl Harbor when the Japanese attacked on December 7, 1941.

On September 28, 1942, Anderson reported for duty as President of the Board of Inspection and Survey, Navy Department, Washington, D.C., a position that was responsible for the preliminary trial, inspection, and acceptance of all vessels and aircraft for use by the Navy.

On July 17, 1944, Anderson assumed duty as Commander, Gulf Sea Frontier, and Commandant, Seventh Naval District, with headquarters in Miami, Florida. In that capacity, Anderson collaborated with the Cuban and Mexican Navies, and with the Royal Air Force in the Bahamas for cooperative operations in the waters of the Gulf Sea Frontier. The responsibilities of that command included the supervision and general direction, in its operational capacity, of the United States Naval Mission to Cuba, and of such vessels of the Cuban Navy as were placed under his general operational direction. On April 3, 1945, Anderson was appointed to the rank of vice admiral. On October 24, 1945, Anderson was relieved as Commander Gulf Sea Frontier and Commandant, Seventh Naval District. He retired on March 1, 1946. For his service in the World War II, Anderson was awarded with the Legion of Merit.

=== Death ===
Vice Admiral Anderson died on October 24, 1981, at one hundred years old. At that time he was the oldest living graduate of the U.S. Naval Academy. Anderson's wife of fifty-six years died on June 15, 1966. His son, Walter Stratton Anderson Jr., died in 1977. Survivors included his two grandchildren Virginia Randolph Anderson and Thomas Stratton Anderson. Walter Anderson and his wife are buried at Arlington National Cemetery.

== Decorations ==
Here is the ribbon bar of Vice admiral Walter S. Anderson:

1st Row	Legion of Merit		Navy and Marine Corps Medal
2nd Row	Mexican Service Medal	World War I Victory Medal with Atlantic Fleet Clasp	American Defense Service Medal with Fleet Clasp
3rd Row	American Campaign Medal	Asiatic-Pacific Campaign Medal	World War II Victory Medal
