= U.S. Navy type commands =

Commands of United States Navy by weapon system

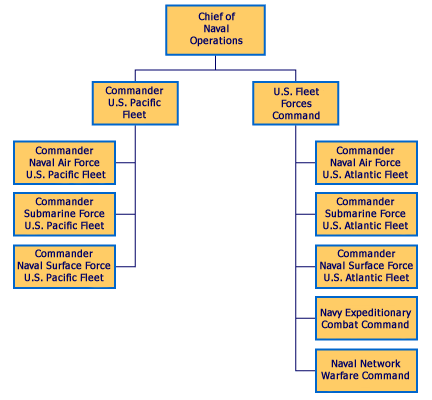
2010 US Navy type command organizational structure

U.S. Navy type commands perform administrative, personnel, and operational training functions in the United States Navy for a "type" of weapon system (e.g., naval aviation, submarine warfare, surface warships) within a fleet organization.

Aircraft carriers, carrier airwings, aircraft squadrons, and naval air stations are under the administrative control of the appropriate Commander Naval Air Force. Ballistic missile submarines, attack submarines, and submarine tenders come under the administrative control of the appropriate Commander Submarine Force. All other surface warships (i.e., cruisers, destroyers, frigates, littoral combat ships, patrol vessels, and amphibious warfare vessels) fall under the administrative control of the appropriate Commander Naval Surface Force. This type command structure is mirrored in United States Fleet Forces Command and the United States Pacific Fleet. Normally, the type command controls the ship during its primary and intermediate training cycles, and then the warship moves under the operational control of the respective fleet command once it is ready for deployment.

The two previous submarine type commands supervised Submarine Groups, Submarine Squadrons, and other units. The Commander of a Submarine Group is known, in official Navy communications, as COMSUBGRU (followed by a number), such as COMSUBGRU ONE.

== History ==
Type commands appear to have emerged during the World War I era. The concept was to create an organization parallel to the tactical organization of the fleet which would "exercise limited supervision over the type as representatives of the commander in chief in matters of policy concerning operation of the type, maintenance, internal organization, alteration, and in type indoctrination concerning tactics, dispositions, and formations. The concept of the fleet type organization is that of a pool from which to draw units for task organizations" During interwar training exercises time would be allocated for ships of a particular type to train together, standardizing the way vessels of the type operated so that individual ships could be rotated in and out of tactical units smoothly, for maintenance or other reasons. By the start of World War II there were type commands for aircraft carriers, battleships, cruisers, destroyers, and submarines, each being commanded by an officer who also commanded a tactical unit operating the type (i.e., a squadron of battleships or destroyers). In the Pacific the type commands were characterized as task forces within the First Fleet, a purely administrative organization under the direct command of Admiral Chester Nimitz.

== Type command structure ==
=== U.S. Fleet Forces Command ===
- Commander, Naval Air Force U.S. Atlantic Fleet
- Commander, Submarine Force Atlantic
- Commander, Naval Surface Force Atlantic
- Commander, Navy Expeditionary Force
- U.S. Navy Information Forces
- Commander, Military Sealift Command
- Commander, Expeditionary Strike Group

=== U.S. Pacific Fleet ===
- Commander, Naval Air Force U.S. Pacific Fleet
- Commander, Submarine Force Pacific
- Commander, Naval Surface Force Pacific
- Commander, Navy Expeditionary Force Pacific

== Disestablished type commands ==
=== U.S. Atlantic Fleet ===
- Amphibious Force, Atlantic Fleet
- Destroyer Force Atlantic Fleet
- Minesweeping Force Atlantic Fleet
- Service Force Atlantic Fleet

=== U.S. Pacific Fleet ===
- Amphibious Force, Pacific Fleet - PhibPac was amalgamated into the new command Commander, Naval Surface Forces Pacific, probably in the mid-1970s.
- Battleship Force Pacific Fleet (ComBatPac)
- Destroyer Force Pacific Fleet (ComDesPac)
- Minesweeping Force Pacific Fleet (ComMinPac). The Commander, Minecraft, Pacific Fleet was responsible for all U.S. Navy minesweepers and other minecraft in the Pacific Fleet. Minesweep forces under the command of ComMinPac were known as MinPac or MINPAC. It appears that ComMinPac was merged into Commander, Naval Surface Forces Pacific in the early 1970s.
- Service Force Pacific Fleet (ComServPac) - also merged into Commander, Naval Surface Forces Pacific in the 1970s.

== Lead-Follow ==
Effective 1 October 2001, the U.S. Navy developed a "Lead-Follow" arrangement among its type commands wherein one type commander is designated the senior lead for the specific "type" of weapon system (i.e., naval aviation, submarine warfare, surface warships) throughout the entire operating U.S. Fleet as it pertains to modernization needs, training initiatives, and operational concept development. These fleet TYCOM commanders will provide guidance to their respective "type" forces via the existing lead-follow TYCOM arrangement.

=== Commander, Naval Air Forces ===
The Commander, U.S. Naval Air Forces, Pacific Fleet (COMNAVAIRPAC) is designated as the Commander, Naval Air Forces (COMNAVAIRFOR) for the U.S. Fleet Forces Command, with the Commander, U.S. Naval Air Forces, Atlantic Fleet (COMNAVAIRLANT) as his deputy. COMNAVAIRFOR is responsible for modernization needs, training initiatives, and operational concept development for the naval aviation community throughout the U.S. Navy's operational fleet.

=== Commander, Naval Submarine Forces ===
The Commander, Submarine Force, US Atlantic Fleet (COMSUBLANT) was designated as the Commander, Naval Submarine Forces (COMNAVSUBFOR) for the U.S. Fleet Forces Command, with the Commander, U.S. Submarine Forces, Pacific Fleet (COMSUBPAC) as his deputy. COMNAVSUBFOR is responsible for modernization needs, training initiatives, and operational concept development for submarine warfare community throughout the U.S. Navy's operational fleet.

=== Commander, Naval Surface Forces ===
The Commander, Naval Surface Force, U.S. Pacific Fleet (COMNAVSURFPAC) was designated as the Commander, Naval Surface Forces (COMNAVSURFOR) for the U.S. Fleet Forces Command, with the Commander, Naval Surface Force, U.S. Atlantic Fleet (COMNAVSURFLANT), serving as his deputy. COMNAVSURFOR is responsible for modernization needs, training initiatives, and operational concept development for the surface warfare community throughout the U.S. Navy's operational fleet.
