= USS Alazon Bay =

Two ships of the United States Navy have been named Alazon Bay for Alazon Bay in Texas.

- USS Alazon Bay (ACV-55), was a Casablanca-class escort carrier originally named USS Ameer (AVG-55), renamed and reclassified as Alazon Bay on 22 January 1943, and renamed again to USS Casablanca (CVE-55) on 3 April 1943.
- USS Alazon Bay (ACV-94), was a separate Casablanca-class escort carrier, renamed to USS Lunga Point on 6 November 1943.
