= USS Williams =

USS Williams has been the name of more than one United States Navy ship, and may refer to:

- USS Williams (SP-498), a patrol vessel in commission from March to December 1918
- USS Williams (DD-108), a Wickes-class destroyer, in commission from 1919 to 1940
- USS Williams (DE-290), a Rudderow-class destroyer escort cancelled in 1944
- USS Williams (DE-372), a John C. Butler-class destroyer escort in commission from 1944 to 1946

== See also ==
- USS Jack Williams (FFG-24)
- USS James E. Williams (DDG-95)
