= USS Casablanca =

Casablanca-class escort carrier of the US Navy

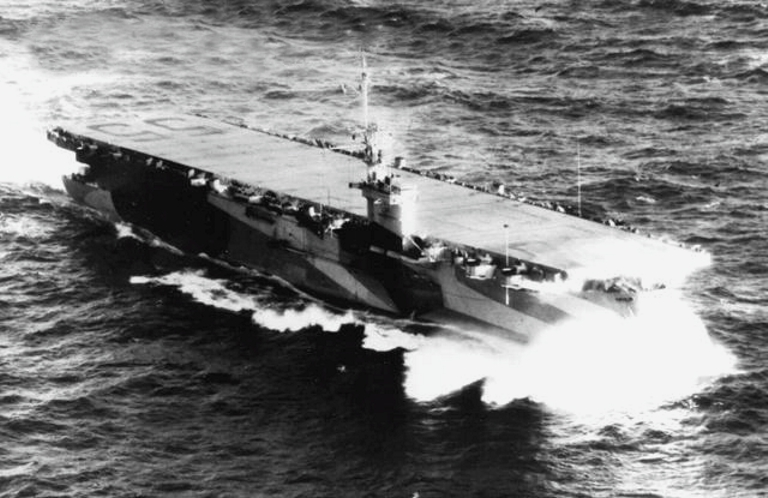
- USS Casablanca underway at sea on 2 March 1945. She is painted in Camouflage Measure 32, Design 12A.

History

United States
- Name: Ameer (1942); Alazon Bay (1943); Casablanca (1943–1947)
- Namesake: Emir (transliterated); Alazan Bay, Texas; Naval Battle of Casablanca
- Ordered: as a Type S4-S2-BB3 hull, MC hull 1092
- Awarded: 18 June 1942
- Builder: Kaiser Shipbuilding Company, Vancouver, Washington
- Cost: $6,033,429.05
- Yard number: 301
- Way number: 7
- Laid down: 3 November 1942
- Launched: 5 April 1943
- Sponsored by: Eleanor Roosevelt
- Commissioned: 8 July 1943
- Decommissioned: 10 June 1946
- Renamed: Alazon Bay, 23 January 1943; Casablanca, 3 April 1943
- Identification: Hull symbol: AVG-55; ACV-55; CVE-55; Code letters: NXMO
- Fate: Sold for scrap, 23 April 1947

General characteristics
- Class & type: Casablanca-class escort carrier
- Displacement: 8,188 long tons (8,319 t) (standard); 10,902 long tons (11,077 t) (full load)
- Length: 512 ft 3 in (156.13 m) (oa); 490 ft (150 m) (wl); 474 ft (144 m) (fd)
- Beam: 65 ft 2 in (19.86 m); 108 ft (33 m) (extreme width)
- Draft: 20 ft 9 in (6.32 m) (max)
- Installed power: 4 × Babcock & Wilcox boilers; 9,000 shp (6,700 kW)
- Propulsion: 2 × Skinner Unaflow reciprocating steam engines; 2 × screws
- Speed: 19 knots (35 km/h; 22 mph)
- Range: 10,240 nmi (18,960 km; 11,780 mi) at 15 kn (28 km/h; 17 mph)
- Complement: Total: 910 – 916 officers and men; Embarked Squadron: 50 – 56; Ship's Crew: 860
- Armament: As designed: 1 × 5 in (127 mm)/38 cal dual-purpose gun; 4 × twin 40 mm (1.57 in) Bofors anti-aircraft guns; 12 × 20 mm (0.79 in) Oerlikon anti-aircraft cannons; Varied, ultimate armament: 1 × 5 in (127 mm)/38 cal dual-purpose gun; 8 × twin 40 mm (1.57 in) Bofors anti-aircraft guns; 20 × 20 mm (0.79 in) Oerlikon anti-aircraft cannons
- Aircraft carried: 27
- Aviation facilities: 1 × catapult; 2 × elevators

Service record
- Part of: United States Pacific Fleet (1943–1946); Atlantic Reserve Fleet (1946)

USS Casablanca (AVG/ACV/CVE-55) was the first of fifty Casablanca-class escort carriers built for the United States Navy during World War II. She was named after the Naval Battle of Casablanca, conducted as a part of the wider Operation Torch, which pitted the United States Navy against the remnants of the French Navy controlled by Vichy France. The American victory cleared the way for the seizure of the port of Casablanca as well as the Allied occupation of French Morocco. The ship was launched in April 1943, commissioned in July, and served as a training and transport carrier throughout the war. Postwar, she participated in Operation Magic Carpet, repatriating U.S. servicemen from throughout the Pacific. She was decommissioned in June 1946, when she was mothballed in the Atlantic Reserve Fleet. She was sold for scrap in April 1947.

== Design and description ==
A side profile of the design of Thetis Bay.

Casablanca was the lead ship of the Casablanca-class escort carriers, the most numerous type of aircraft carriers ever built. Built to stem heavy losses during the Battle of the Atlantic, they came into service in late 1943, by which time the U-boat threat was already in retreat. Although some did see service in the Atlantic, the majority were utilized in the Pacific, ferrying aircraft, providing logistics support, and conducting close air support for the island-hopping campaigns. The Casablanca-class carriers were built on the standardized Type S4-S2-BB3 hull, a lengthened variant of the Doyen-class hull, and specifically designed to be mass-produced using welded prefabricated sections. This allowed them to be produced at unprecedented speeds: the final ship of her class, Munda, was delivered to the Navy just 101 days after the laying of her keel.

Casablanca was 512 ft 3 in (156.13 m) long overall (490 ft (150 m) at the waterline), had a beam of 65 ft 2 in (19.86 m), and a draft of 20 ft 9 in (6.32 m). She displaced 8,188 long tons (8,319 t) standard, which increased to 10,902 long tons (11,077 t) with a full load. To carry out flight operations, the ship had a 257 ft (78 m) hangar deck and a 474 ft (144 m) flight deck. Her compact size necessitated the installation of an aircraft catapult at her bow, and there were two aircraft elevators to facilitate movement of aircraft between the flight and hangar deck: one each fore and aft.

She was powered by four Babcock & Wilcox Express D boilers that raised 285 psi (1,970 kPa) of steam at 577 °F (303 °C). The steam generated by these boilers fed two Skinner Unaflow reciprocating steam engines, delivering 9,000 hp (6,700 kW) to two propeller shafts. This allowed her to reach speeds of 19 kn (35 km/h; 22 mph), with a cruising range of 10,240 nmi (18,960 km; 11,780 mi) at 15 kn (28 km/h; 17 mph). For armament, one 5 in (127 mm)/38 caliber dual-purpose gun was mounted on the stern. Additional anti-aircraft defense was provided by eight Bofors 40 mm (1.57 in) anti-aircraft guns in single mounts and twelve Oerlikon 20 mm (0.79 in) cannons mounted around the perimeter of the deck. By 1945, Casablanca-class carriers had been modified to carry twenty Oerlikon cannons and sixteen Bofors guns; the doubling of the latter was accomplished by putting them into twin mounts. Sensors onboard consisted of a SG surface-search radar and a SK air-search radar.

Although Casablanca-class escort carriers were intended to function with a crew of 860 and an embarked squadron of 50 to 56, the exigencies of wartime often necessitated the inflation of the crew count. They were designed to operate with 27 aircraft, but the hangar deck could accommodate much more during transport or training missions.

== Construction ==
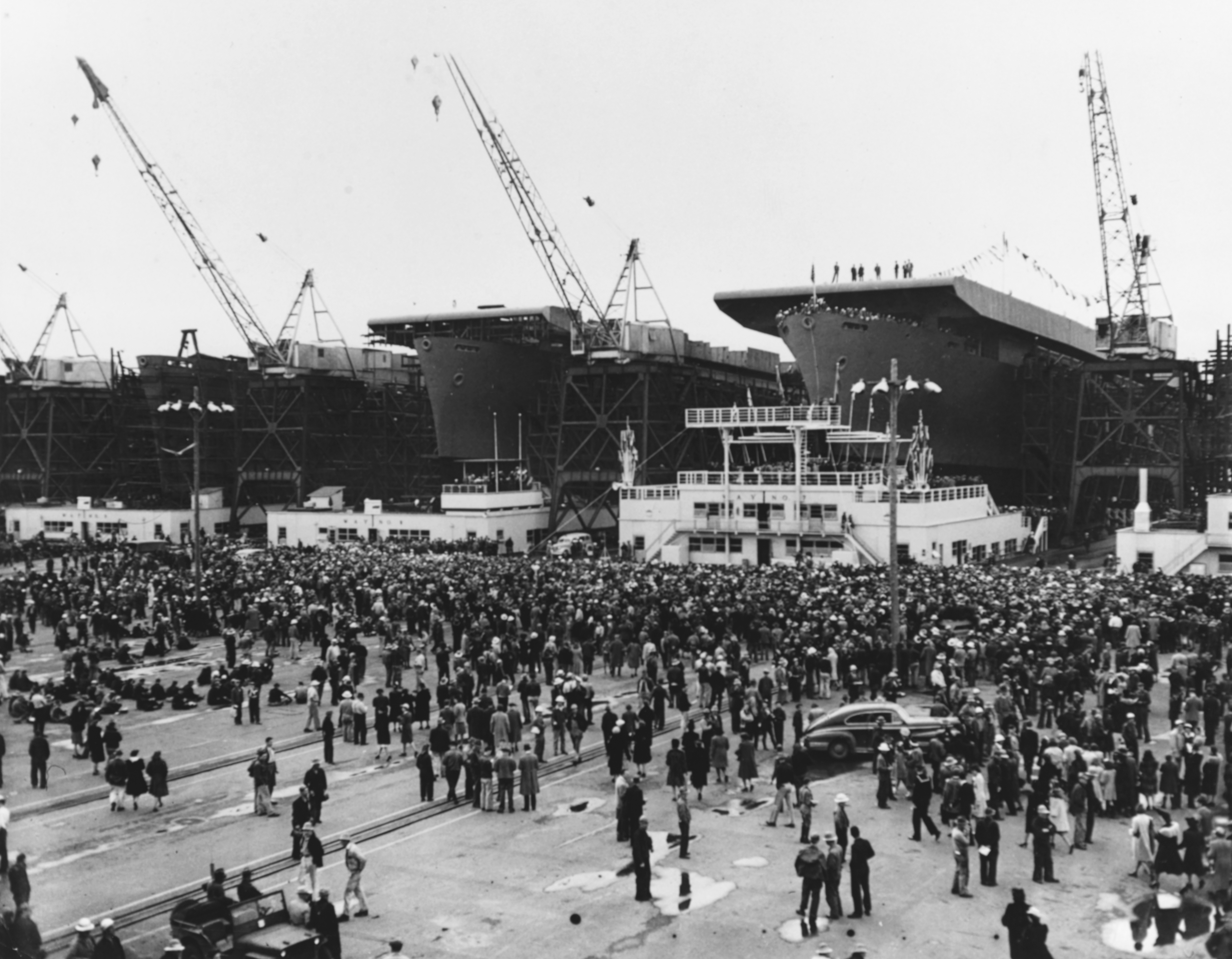
Casablanca, the hull furthest to the right, photographed on 5 April 1943 just prior to her launch. Two of her sister ships are visible to the left of her.

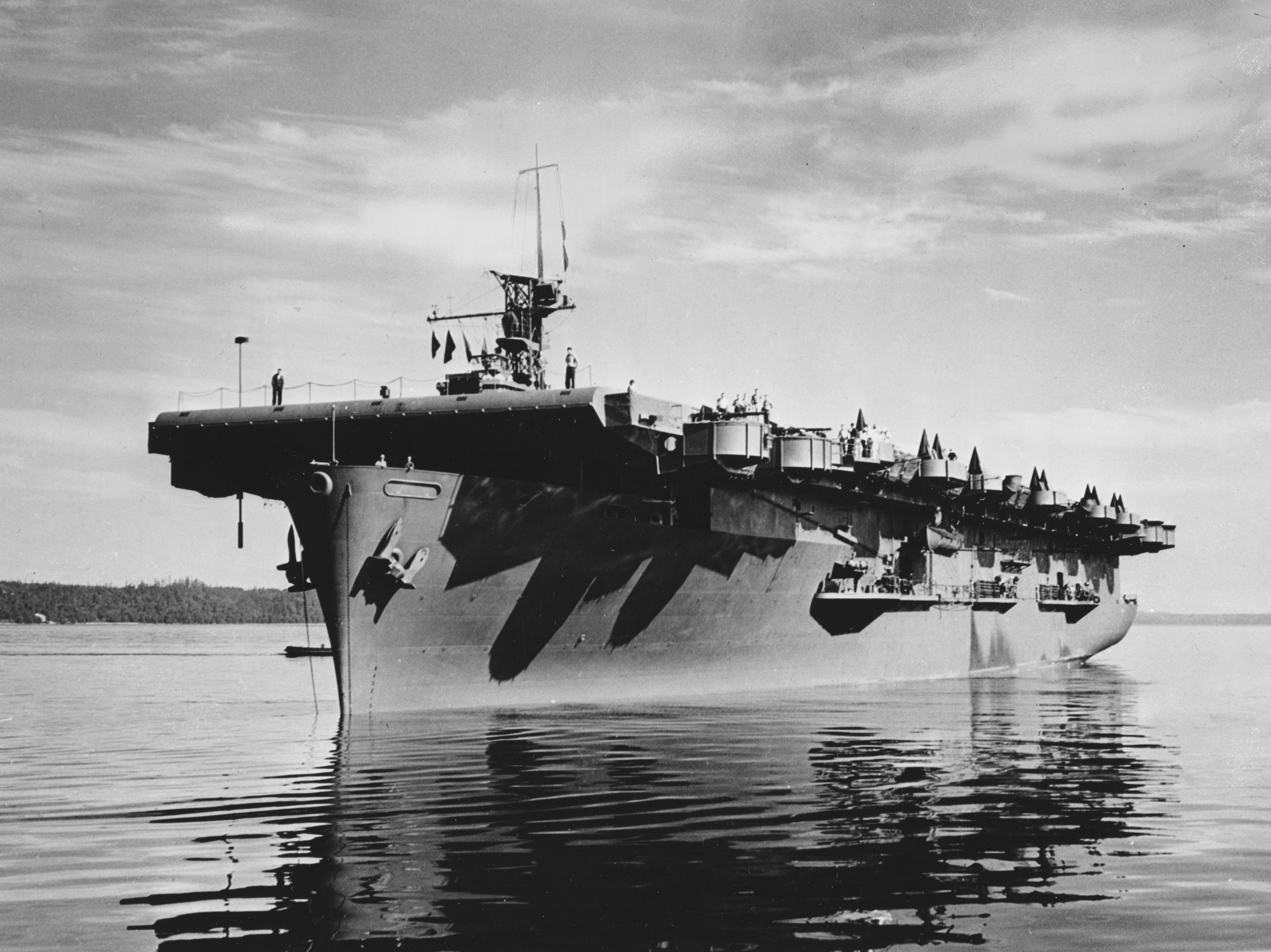
Casablanca photographed in Puget Sound around July 1943. Note that the radar antennas have been scrubbed from the image due to wartime censorship.

Her construction was awarded to Kaiser Shipbuilding Company, Vancouver, Washington, under a Maritime Commission contract, on 18 June 1942, with the classification symbol AVG-55, indicating that she would be the 55th escort carrier, AVG representing an aircraft escort vessel, numbered in the same series as the escort carriers. On 20 August, the future carrier was reclassified as ACV-55, the hull symbol representing an auxiliary aircraft carrier. The escort carrier was laid down on 3 November 1942 under the name Ameer, with the original plans calling for her transfer to the Royal Navy under the lend-lease program. She was laid down as MC hull 1092, the first of a series of fifty Casablanca-class escort carriers.

On 23 February 1943, it was determined that her sister ship Liscome Bay, the second Casablanca-class carrier to be constructed would be transferred under lend-lease in Casablanca's place. (Note: Eventually, it was the Bogue-class escort carrier Baffins that would be transferred to the Royal Navy under the name Ameer.) Therefore, she was renamed Alazon Bay, a misspelling of Alazan Bay, located in Kleberg County, Texas, as part of a tradition which named escort carriers after bays or sounds. She was then further renamed to Casablanca on 3 April, with her previous name later being assigned to the hull of her sister Lunga Point. She was launched on 5 April; sponsored by the First Lady Mrs. Eleanor Roosevelt; transferred to the Navy on 8 July, commissioned and reclassified as CVE-55 on 15 July.

== Service history ==
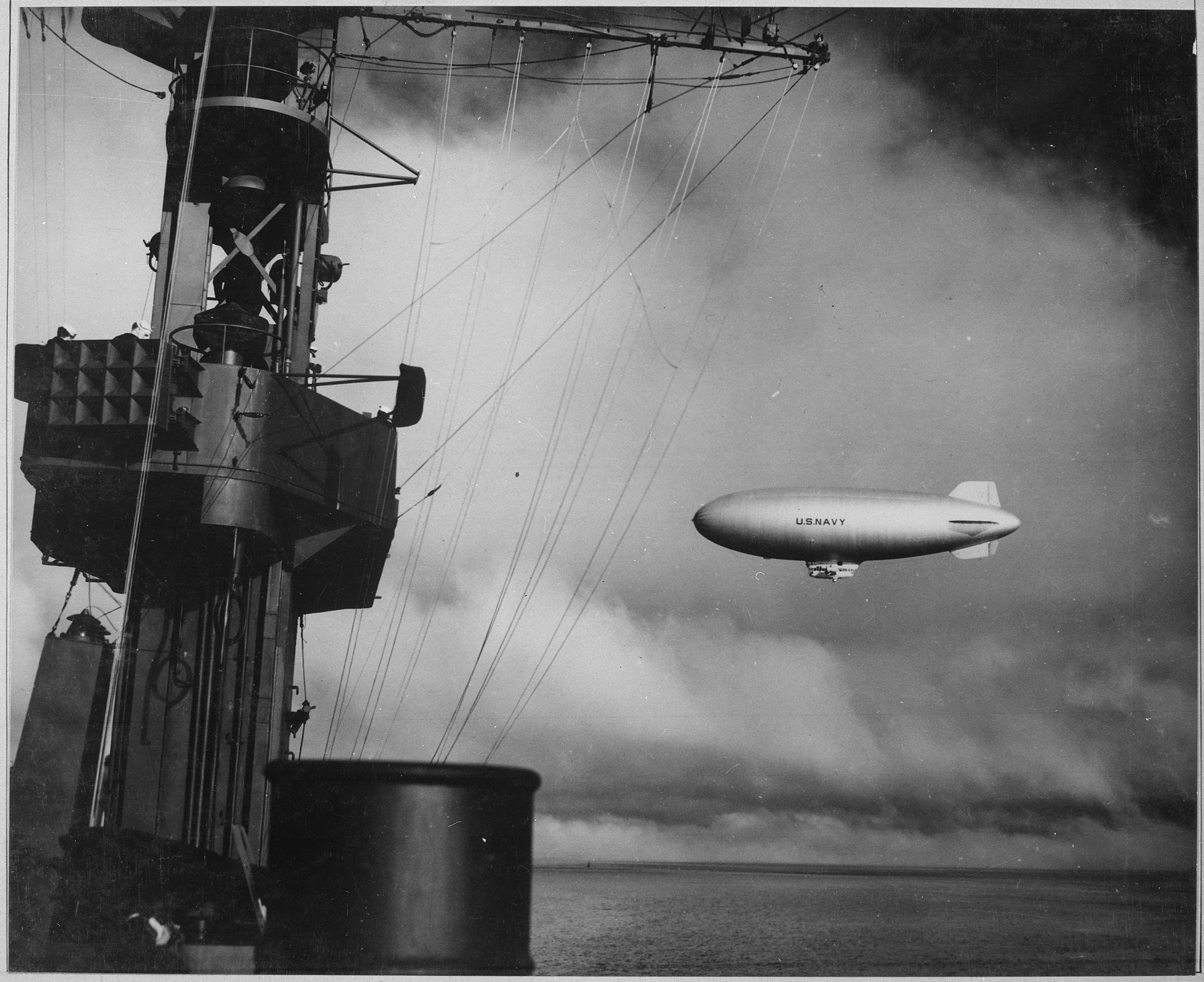
A U.S. Navy dirigible is photographed accompanying Casablanca during training exercises, 8 August 1943.

Upon being commissioned, it was discovered that Casablanca had a propeller defect, handicapping her speed and handling, which rendered her completely unsuitable for frontline or even transport service. Therefore, the Navy used her as a training vessel, operating in the Strait of Juan de Fuca to provide pilot certifications. For the next year, until August 1944, a steady stream of carrier squadrons were trained on board Casablanca, rotating off for service on a frontline carrier once they had finished qualifications. In addition, she was used as a training vessel for crews bound for the other Casablanca-class carriers prior to commissioning, with crews typically spending two weeks learning how to operate the equipment and how to maneuver the ship. These crews would therefore report for service on their newly commissioned Casablanca-class carriers with a modicum of experience. The Navy also used Casablanca as a ship to gather data on how the escort carriers fared during prolonged periods at sea, measuring her material readiness and the ability of her equipment. Lessons learned on Casablanca were therefore implemented on Casablanca-class carriers to come.

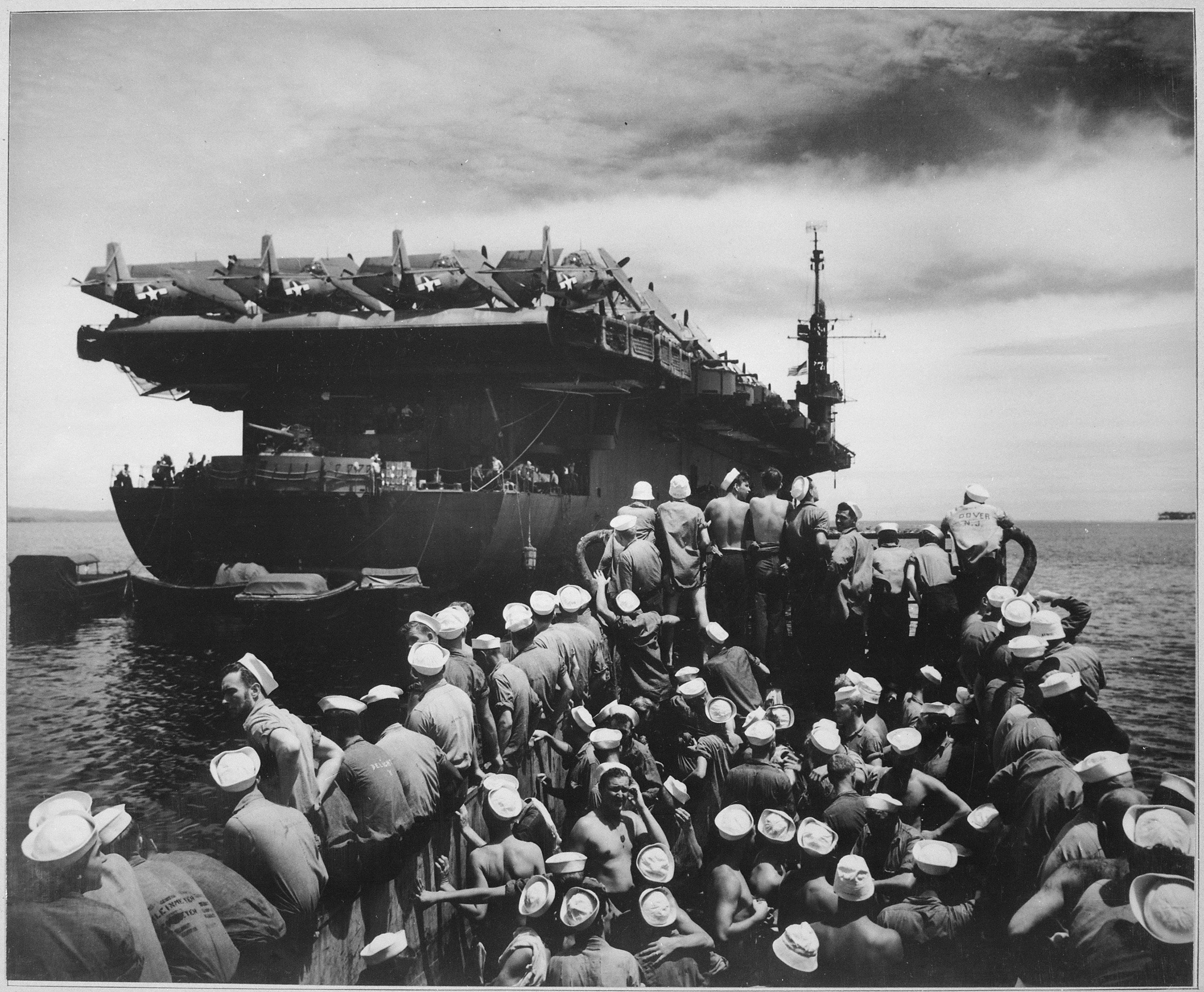
Personnel from Casablanca return to the escort carrier from Rara Island, off of Manus Island, on board a mechanized landing craft.

In the summer of 1944, Casablanca was put into dry dock, and her propeller defect was corrected. Hence, she was certified to begin transport missions. On 24 August, after taking on a load of personnel, airplanes, and aviation gasoline at Naval Air Station Alameda, she put through the Golden Gate Bridge, and passed San Francisco en route to Manus Island in the Admiralty Islands. She returned to Seattle on 8 October, and immediately continued her previous duties in Puget Sound as a training carrier, carrying out much of the same activities, this time preparing the pre-commissioning crews of Commencement Bay-class escort carriers. During this period, she was damaged by a storm, and proceeded into San Diego harbor on 22 January 1945 for repairs. On 12 February, Captain John Lewis Murphy assumed command of the vessel.

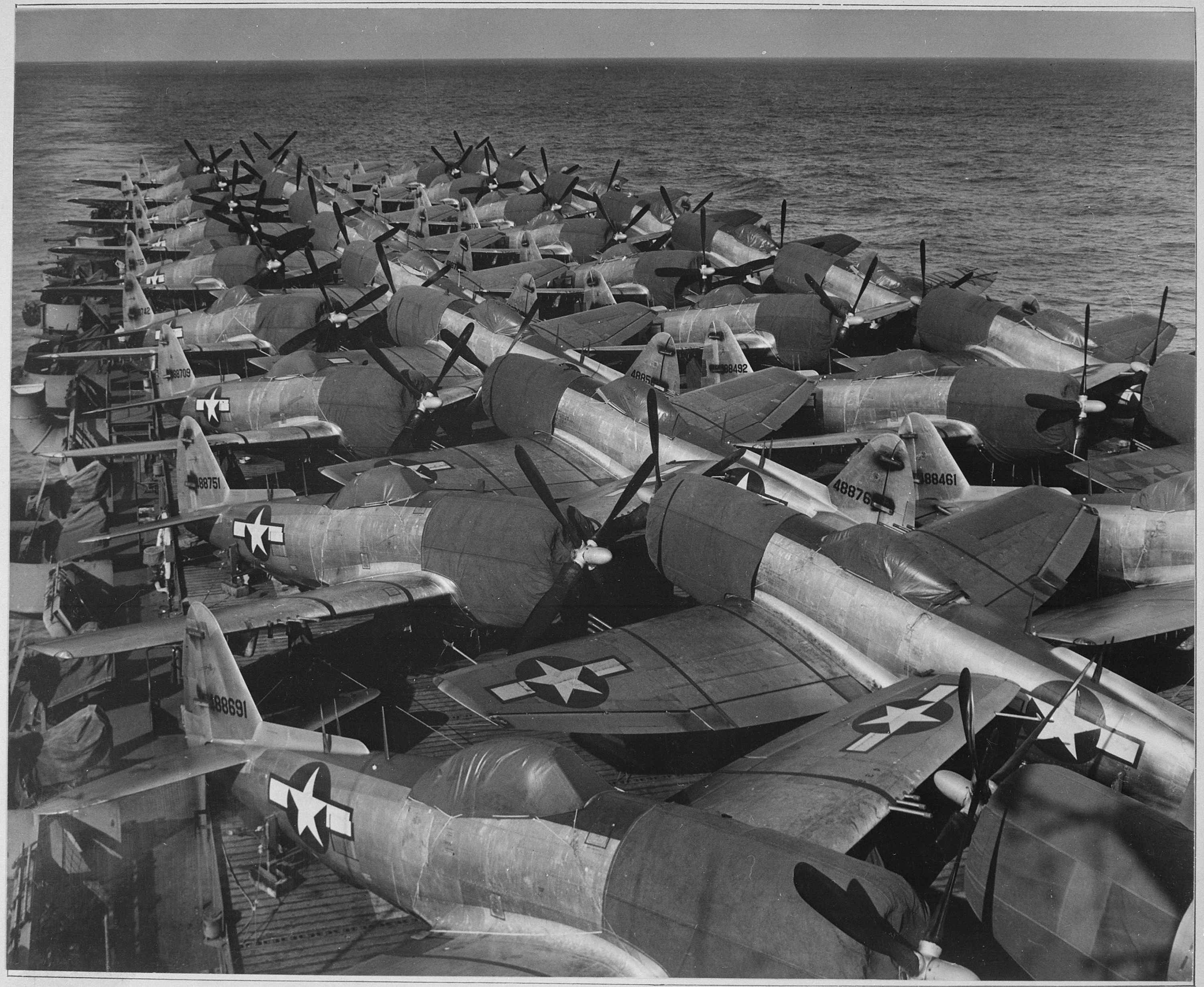
Casablanca's flight deck, which is full of Republic P-47 Thunderbolts, photographed on 16 July 1945.

Casablanca returned to sea on 13 March, and with her repairs completed, she proceeded westwards for another transport mission. Stopping at Pearl Harbor, she headed to Guam, where she unloaded some of her cargo. She then carried out transport runs between Samar in the Philippines, Manus, and Palau until 12 May, when she proceeded back to the West Coast for overhaul, carrying on board a load of medically unfit personnel. Upon arrival, she replenished and was sent west again, delivering passengers to Pearl Harbor on 24 June. She spent the summer making transport runs from the West Coast to Pearl Harbor and Guam. During one of these transport missions, whilst arriving at Guam, the Surrender of Japan was announced.

After a brief period in which Casablanca yet again served as a training carrier providing pilot qualifications off of Saipan in August, she was retrofitted into a troopship, and joined the Operation Magic Carpet fleet, which repatriated U.S. servicemen from around the Pacific. Her first run concluded in San Francisco on 24 September. She then ferried some personnel to Pearl Harbor in September and October. At Pearl Harbor, she made her second run, stopping at Espiritu Santo and Nouméa, repatriating servicemen to the West Coast. Her third and final run, which ran from 8 December to 16 January 1946, was a run from San Francisco to Yokohama, occupied Japan.

Casablanca left San Francisco harbor on 23 January, proceeding to Norfolk, Virginia, arriving on 10 February. There, she was mothballed in the Atlantic Reserve Fleet on 30 May. She was decommissioned on 10 June, and struck from the Navy list on 3 July. She was sold on 23 April 1947 for scrapping, ultimately being broken up in Chester, Pennsylvania, throughout the latter half of 1947.

== Sources ==
=== Online sources ===
- "Casablanca".
- "Casablanca (CVE-55)". Dictionary of American Naval Fighting Ships. Naval History and Heritage Command. 1 April 2020. Archived from the original on 30 October 2020. This article incorporates text from this source, which is in the public domain.
- "Kaiser Vancouver, Vancouver WA". www.ShipbuildingHistory.com. 27 November 2010. Archived from the original on 16 June 2019.
- Maksel, Rebecca (14 August 2012). "How Do You Name an Aircraft Carrier?". Air & Space/Smithsonian.
- "Escort Carrier Photo Archive USS Casablanca (ACV-55)". NavSource. 15 December 2018.

=== Bibliography ===
- Adcock, Al (1996), Escort Carriers in Action - Warships No. 9, Carrollton, Texas: Squadron/Signal Publications, ISBN 9780897473569
- Chesneau, Robert; Gardiner, Robert (1980), Conway's All the World's Fighting Ships 1922–1946, London, England: Naval Institute Press, ISBN 9780870219139
- Friedman, Norman (1983), U.S. Aircraft Carriers: An Illustrated Design History, Annapolis, Maryland: Naval Institute Press, ISBN 9780870217395
- Jones, Barbara G. Haney (2010), The role the USS Casablanca (CVE-55) played in World War II in the Pacific, Lewiston, New York: Edwin Mellen Press, ISBN 9780773438507
- Ross, Al (1993), The Escort Carrier Gambier Bay, Anatomy of the Ship, London, England: Conway Maritime Press, ISBN 9781557502353
- Y'Blood, William (2012), The Little Giants: U.S. Escort Carriers Against Japan, Annapolis, Maryland: Naval Institute Press, ISBN 9781612512471
