= John H. Newton =

American vice admiral

John Henry Newton
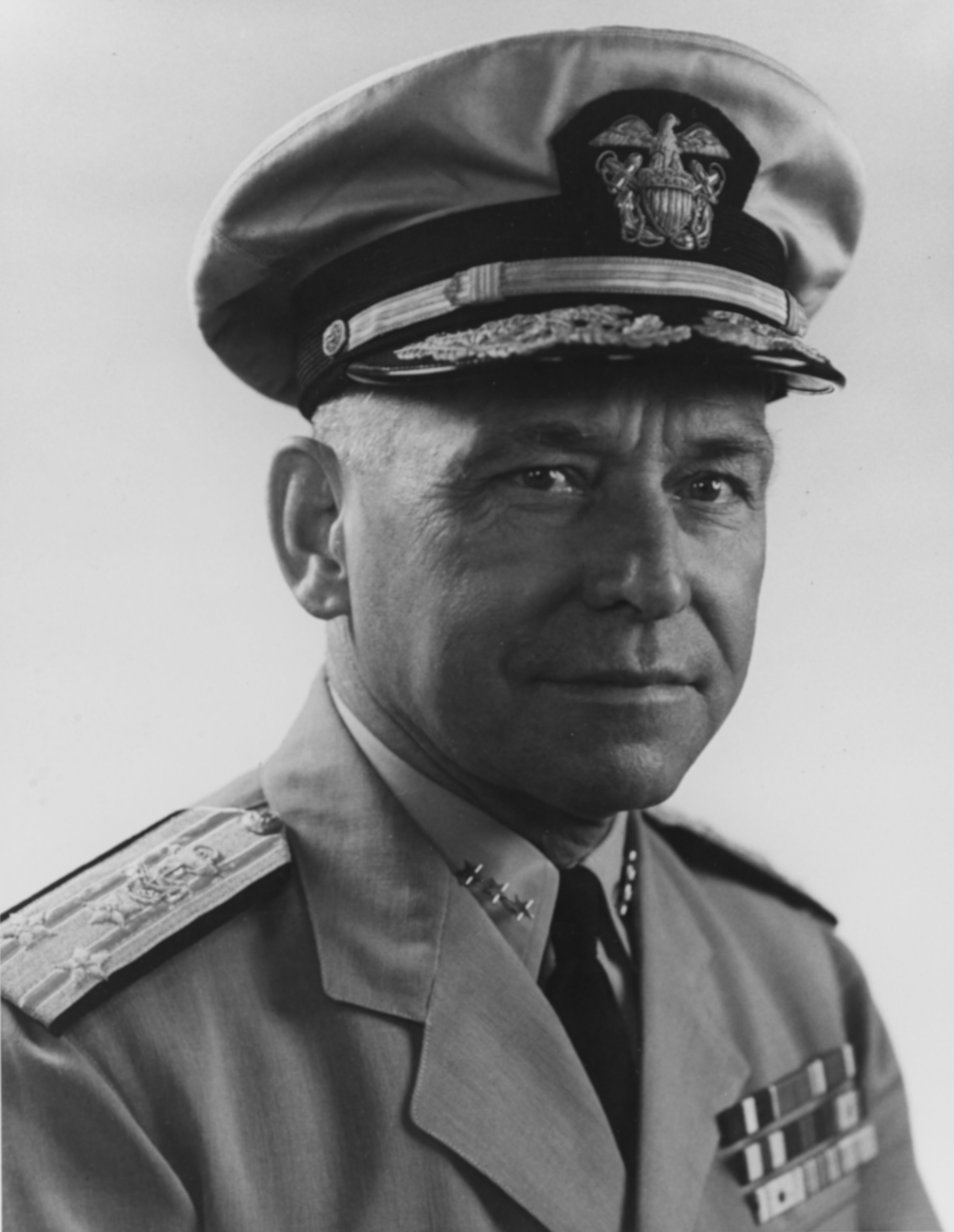
- Vice Admiral John H. Newton, USN
- Born: December 13, 1881; Pittston, Pennsylvania, US
- Died: May 2, 1948 (aged 66); Fort Ord, California, US
- Burial place: United States Naval Academy Cemetery
- Military career
- Allegiance: United States
- Branch: United States Navy
- Service years: 1905–1946
- Rank: Vice Admiral
- Commands: South Pacific Area; Cruiser Division Four; Naval Postgraduate School; USS Trenton; USS Maury; USS Patterson
- Conflicts: Cuban Pacification; Veracruz expedition World War I World War II
- Awards: Navy Cross; Distinguished Service Medal; Legion of Merit

John Henry Newton (December 13, 1881 – May 2, 1948) was a highly decorated officer in the United States Navy with the rank of vice admiral. He distinguished himself as commanding officer of destroyer USS Patterson during World War I and received the Navy Cross, the United States Navy second-highest decoration awarded for valor in combat.

Following the War, Newton remained in the Navy and reached flag rank during World War II, serving as commander, South Pacific Area and inspector general of the Pacific Fleet under his Naval Academy classmate, Fleet admiral Chester W. Nimitz.

== Early career ==
John H. Newton was born on December 13, 1881, in Pittston, Pennsylvania, the son of blacksmith John H. and Elizabeth Newton, who were both of English descent. He graduated from the high school in Carbondale, Pennsylvania, and was appointed to the United States Naval Academy at Annapolis, Maryland, from the Eleventh District of Pennsylvania in summer 1901. While at the academy, he was active in baseball and reached the rank of cadet petty officer 1st class.

Among his classmates were many future great naval leaders including Fleet admiral Chester Nimitz; four star admiral Royal E. Ingersoll; vice admirals Harold G. Bowen Sr., Arthur B. Cook and Herbert F. Leary; and rear admirals Wilhelm L. Friedell, William R. Furlong, Stanford C. Hooper, Byron McCandless, John W. Wilcox Jr. and Walter B. Woodson.

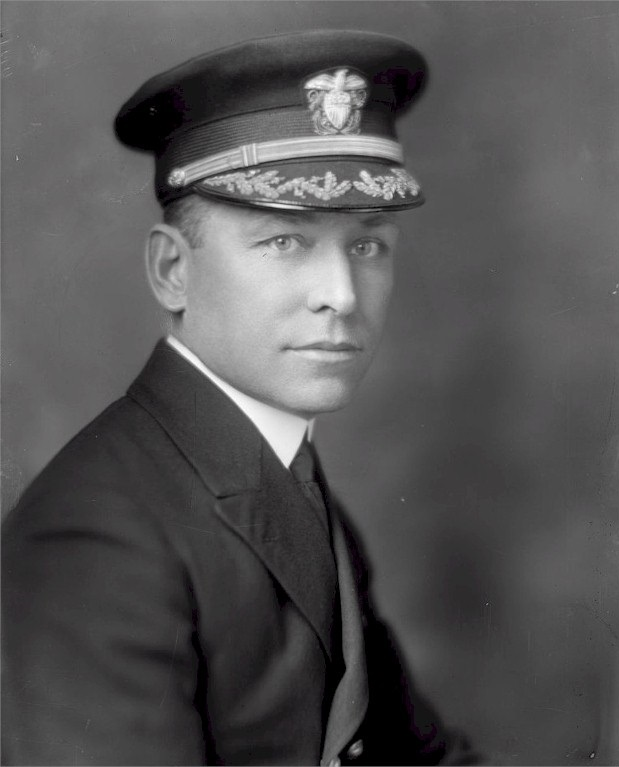
Newton as Commander in 1922.

Newton graduated as Passed Midshipman with Bachelor of Science degree in January 1905 and joined newly commissioned gunboat USS Ranger and departed for the Asiatic Station. Due to recurring maintenance problems of the ship, Ranger was decommissioned at Cavite in June 1905 and Newton was transferred to the battleship USS Oregon. He served aboard until November that year, when he was transferred to the monitor USS Monadnock. Newton served as ship's chief engineer until August 1906 and took part in the patrols along the coast of China.

He was subsequently transferred to the gunboat USS Helena and served again as Chief engineer within the South China patrol until March 1908. Newton was meanwhile commissioned ensign in January 1907, after serving two years at sea required then by law. He served in Chinese waters until February 1909, when he rejoined gunboat Ranger and returned to the United States via Suez Canal for new assignment. Newton was subsequently assigned to the armored cruiser USS Montana stationed at Guantánamo Bay, Cuba within Cuban Pacification, but embarked shortly thereafter for the Turkish waters, where she operated during the protection of American interests during Young Turk Revolution.

The Montana returned to the United States in September 1909 and Newton witnessed Hudson–Fulton Celebration in New York City. The Montana subsequently spent several months with patrols in the Atlantic and Newton was promoted to Lieutenant (junior grade) on January 31, 1910. In April that year, he Montana sailed for Argentina in connection with the celebration of Argentina Centennial. Newton was detached in August and assumed duty as an executive officer aboard newly commissioned destroyer USS Roe under Lieutenant Commander Clark H. Woodward.

Newton then took part in the exercises in the Norfolk, Virginia, area and was promoted to lieutenant on December 23, 1910. He then took part in the winter exercises in the Gulf of Mexico and then returned to Norfolk, where Newton remained until August 1911. Newton was subsequently ordered to the Naval Torpedo Station at Newport, Rhode Island, where he was in command of the torpedo boats in the reserve there.

In November 1912, Newton was ordered to the New York Navy Yard in Brooklyn, where he served as aide to the commandant of the yard, Lewis Sayre Van Duzer. He remained in this capacity until May 1914, when he was assigned to the newly commissioned battleship USS New York under Captain Thomas S. Rodgers. Newton participated in her shakedown cruise along the East Coast of the United States, but when nine American sailors were arrested by the Mexican government in Veracuz, President Woodrow Wilson demanded apology and ordered the naval blockade of Veracruz, when New York took part in the blockade from July to November 1914.

== World War I ==
Newton then assumed command of destroyer USS Patterson. He led his vessel during the patrol cruises in the Atlantic and the Caribbean and took part in protecting life and property during a revolution in Haiti in late 1915. Under his command, Patterson won the battle efficiency pennant for destroyer class in 1915 and 1916 for battle effectiveness.

Following the United States' entry into World War I in April 1917, Newton led his destroyer to the European waters and joined the Destroyer Force based on Queenstown, Ireland. He subsequently commanded Patterson during the anti-submarine patrols and escorted several convoys of troops and supplies in the waters infested with mines and submarines. Patterson also dropped depth charges to help drive away a German U-boat attacking SS Indian. Newton was promoted to lieutenant commander on June 18, 1917.

Newton was succeeded by Lieutenant Commander William R. Purnell in October 1917 and joined the staff of commander, Destroyer Flotillas under Captain Joseph K. Taussig as his gunnery officer. He remained in that capacity until July 1918, when he was ordered back to the United States. For his service in Europe, Newton was decorated with the Navy Cross, the United States Navy second-highest decoration awarded for valor in combat.

Upon his return to the United States, Newton assumed command of newly commissioned destroyer USS Maury and embarked for the Mediterranean Sea, where he participated in the escort convoy duty until March 1919.

== Interwar period ==
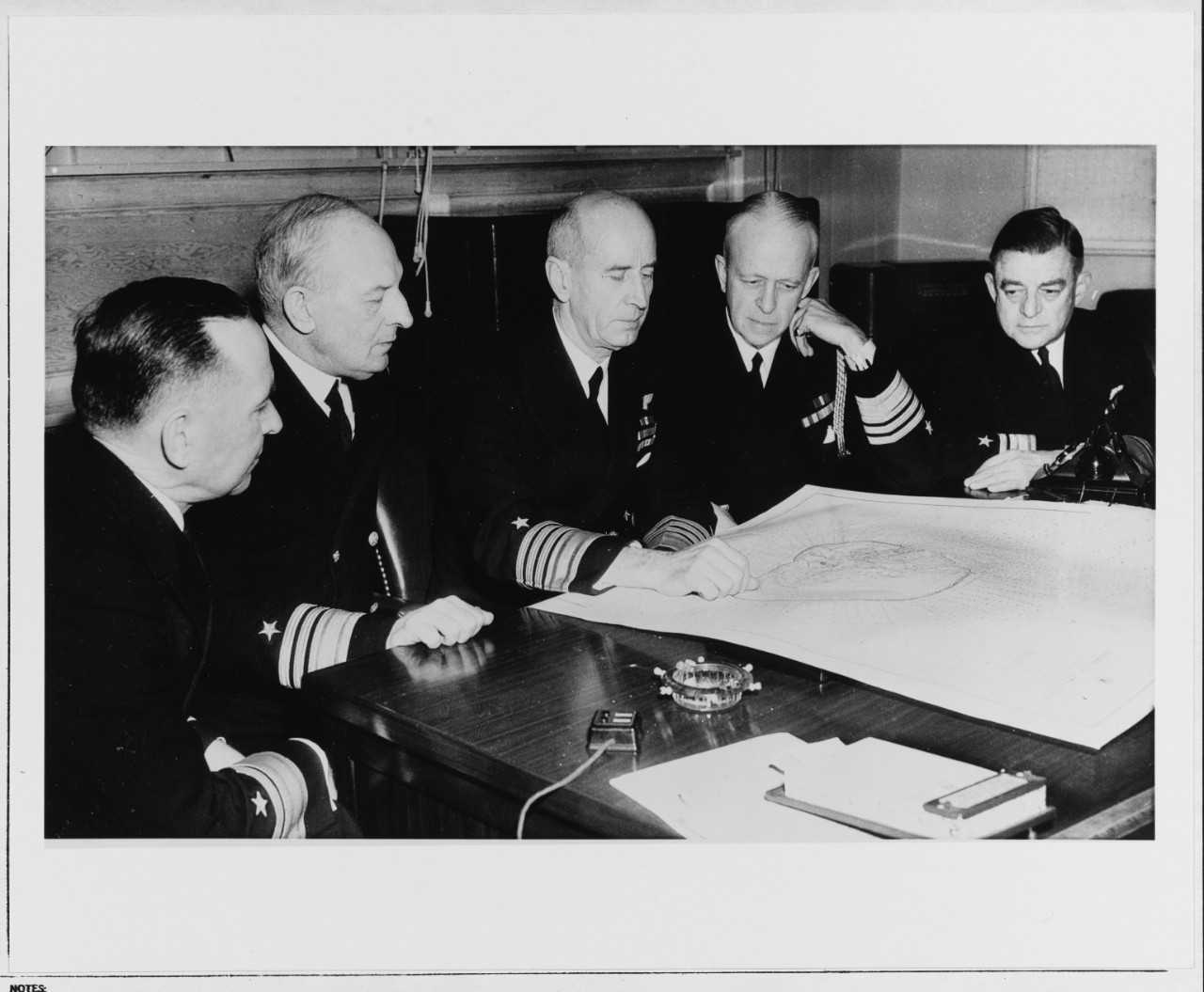
Newton (left) with CNO, Admiral King (center) and his staff in early 1942.

Newton was subsequently ordered back to the United States Naval Academy at Annapolis, Maryland, and served in the Executive Department under Rear Admiral Archibald Scales until August 1920, when he was appointed executive officer of troopship USS Great Northern, former Passenger ship acquired for military service during the War. The Great Northern was later renamed USS Columbia and served as a floating command post during the winter exercise in the Caribbean with the Atlantic Fleet. Newton was transferred to transport ship USS Henderson in March 1922 and served as her executive officer during her trip to Tokyo, Japan. He was promoted to commander on January 12, 1922.

He was detached from the Henderson in October that year and was ordered to Fore River Shipyard in Quincy, Massachusetts, for duty in connection with fitting out of light cruiser USS Detroit. Upon the commissioning of that ship in July 1923, Newton served as her executive officer under Captain John Halligan Jr. and took part in the shakedown cruise to the Mediterranean, where she participated in the fleet exercises.

In June 1924, Newton was ordered to the Naval War College at Newport, Rhode Island, where he completed senior course one year later and joined the Division of War Plans, Office of the Chief of Naval Operations. He served in that assignment until January 1927, when he was appointed executive officer of battleship USS Idaho. After patrolling the West Coast of the United States, Newton was ordered again to the Naval Academy at Annapolis and assumed duty as aide to the superintendent Samuel Robison with additional duty as officer-in-charge of Buildings and Grounds. While in this capacity, he was promoted to captain on December 26, 1928.

Newton returned to sea duty in June 1931, when assumed command of light cruiser USS Trenton. His vessel served as flagship of Commander Cruiser Division TWO under Rear Admiral Clarence S. Kempff and took part patrols and exercise with the Scouting Force along the East Coast of the United States and Caribbean. Newton was ordered to the United States Naval Academy in June 1933 and headed the Naval Postgraduate School until May 1936, when he assumed command of Destroyer Squadron Three of the Scouting Force. He served in this capacity until June 1937, when he was appointed chief of staff and aide to commander, destroyers, Battle Force under Rear Admiral Walton R. Sexton.

On June 23, 1938, Newton was promoted to rear admiral and ordered again to the Naval War College at Newport, Rhode Island, where completed advanced course in April of the following year. He was subsequently appointed commander, Cruiser Division FOUR and in October 1940 was transferred to the command of Cruiser Division FIVE, which he commanded until February 1941.

== World War II ==
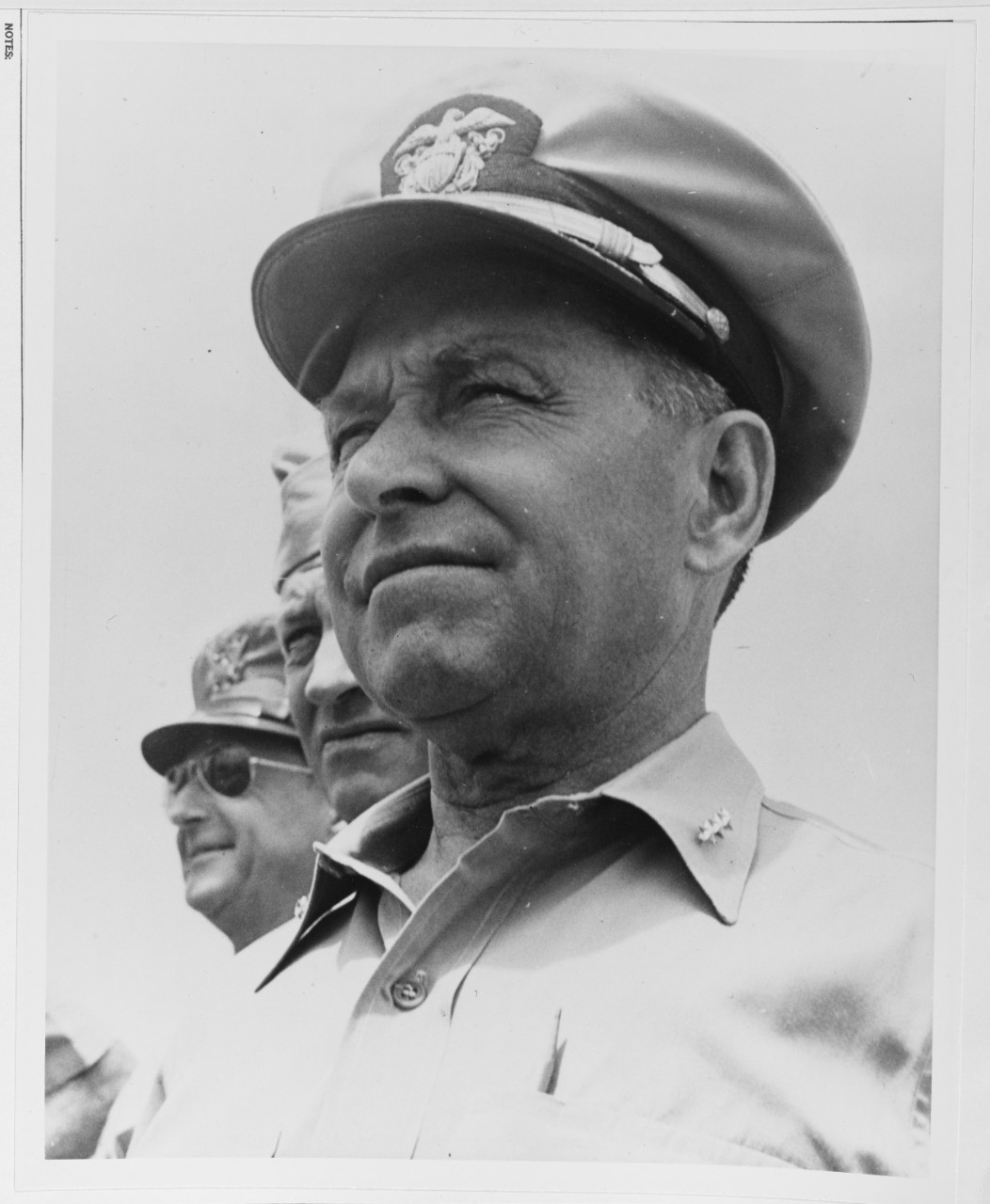
Admiral Newton at Noumea, New Caledonia, in 1943.

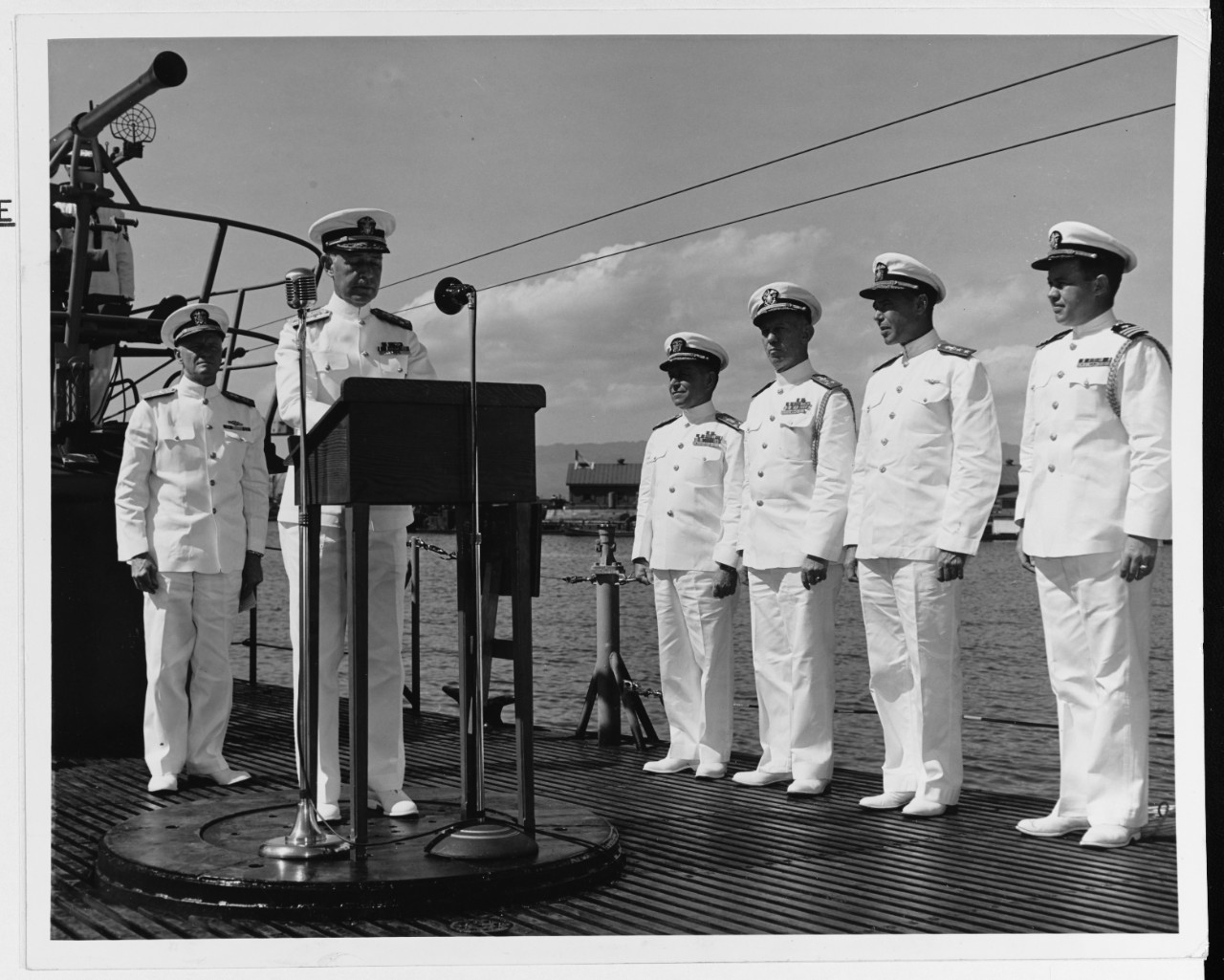
Newton (fourth from right) looks on as Admiral Raymond A. Spruance reads his orders, as he relieves Fleet Admiral Chester W. Nimitz as CINCPACFLT.

Newton then assumed command of Cruisers, Scouting Force with additional duty as commander, Cruiser Division Four, consisted of twelve cruisers in three divisions, approximately fifteen destroyers and three aircraft squadrons assigned to his command. In addition to the patrolling of the Pacific ocean, hed led his command to the visit of Australia and New Zealand. At the time of Japanese attack on Pearl Harbor on December 7, 1941, he led a carrier task force built around USS Lexington to deliver marine scout-bombers to Midway Island garrison.

He was succeeded by Rear Admiral Frank J. Fletcher in January 1942 and ordered back to the United States for new assignment. Newton was attached to the Office of the Chief of Naval Operations in Washington, D.C., and served as Admiral Ernest J. King's sub-chief of naval operations. While in this capacity, he was responsible for the planning and execution of wartime projects and received Legion of Merit for his service.

Newton was promoted to the temporary rank of vice admiral on October 19, 1943, and ordered back to the Pacific area for duty as deputy commander-in-chief, Pacific Ocean Areas under his Naval Academy classmate, Chester Nimitz. He was stationed at Pearl Harbor and made several inspection trips to the combat areas, including Tarawa in Gilbert Islands. Newton was appointed commander, South Pacific Area in mid-June 1944 and held this assignment until the end of War.

While in this assignments, Newton was charged with the supervision of ships and bases engaged in combat operations or in the support of our progressive advances in the Pacific, he directed the staging of personnel and the repair, maintenance and replenishment of Fleet units while handling the detailed logistic problems in the preparation and execution of assault activities for major campaigns against the Japanese. He also supervised the construction and efficient maintenance of advance bases and airfields and contributed to the success of offensives in the Bismarck Archipelago and others. Newton was appointed Inspector General, Pacific Fleet in March 1945.

Following the surrender of Japan, Newton became Deputy Commander-in-Chief, Pacific Fleet and Pacific Ocean Areas under Fleet admiral Chester Nimitz and held this assignment until November 1945. He was subsequently ordered back to the United States and attached for temporary duty to the Bureau of Naval Personnel. Newton retired from active duty on May 1, 1946, after 41 years of service and received Navy Distinguished Service Medal for his service with the Pacific Fleet.

== Death ==
Upon his retirement from the Navy, Newton settled in Carmel, California, but his heart condition did not allow him to work anymore. He was transported to the Army Base Hospital at Fort Ord on Monterey Bay after series of heart attacks and died on May 2, 1948, aged 66. Vice Admiral Newton was buried with full military honors at United States Naval Academy Cemetery at Annapolis, Maryland. His wife Elsie Barr Curry died several months after him. They had one son, John Henry Newton Jr., who also served in the Navy and retired as lieutenant commander.

== Decorations ==
Here is the ribbon bar of Vice admiral John H. Newton:

1st Row	Navy Cross		Navy Distinguished Service Medal
2nd Row	Legion of Merit	Cuban Pacification Medal	Haitian Campaign Medal
3rd Row	Mexican Service Medal	World War I Victory Medal with Fleet Clasp	American Defense Service Medal with Base Clasp
4th Row	Asiatic-Pacific Campaign Medal with three 3/16 inch bronze service stars	American Campaign Medal	World War II Victory Medal

== See also ==
- Naval Postgraduate School

Military offices
Preceded by William Halsey Jr.	Commander, South Pacific Area; June 15, 1944 – March 13, 1945	Succeeded by William L. Calhoun
