= Baffin Bay (Texas) =

Bay in South Texas

Baffin Bay, Texas
- Location within Texas Location within the United States

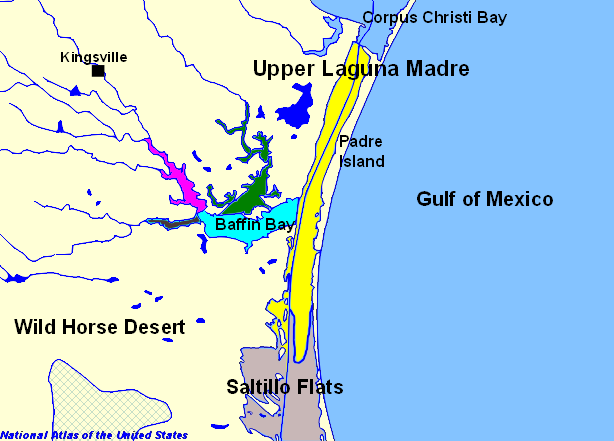
- Coordinates: 27°15′21″N 97°30′59″W
- Max. length: 23 km (14 mi)
- Max. width: 3–7 km (2–4 mi)
- Surface area: 219 km^{2} (100 sq mi)
- Average depth: 2.3 m (8 ft)

Baffin Bay is a bay in South Texas, an inlet of the larger Laguna Madre. Located near the Gulf of Mexico, Baffin Bay forms part of the boundary between Kenedy County and Kleberg County.

== Etymology ==
The history of the bay name is unclear. The most popular story is that Captain Mifflin Kenedy (1818–1895), after visiting the Arctic Baffin Bay as a young man, gave the same name to the bay in Texas because of the remarkable contrast between the bays. The Arctic Baffin Bay is located between the Baffin Island of Canada and Greenland, and it is about 310 times larger by area than the Baffin Bay in Texas.

== Hydrology ==
The Baffin Bay has three branches, which are named as follows (counterclockwise on the map above): Alazan Bay on the north (green), Cayo del Grullo (purple) and Laguna Salada (blue). Several ephemeral streams, including San Fernando, Santa Gertrudis and Los Olmos, flow into the bay, but only when it rains. Because of the scarce freshwater inflow and extensive evaporation, which is promoted by shallow water and warm climate, the bay has a relatively high water salinity reaching 75‰ (parts per thousand) in its northern part. Between 1946 and 1948 and in 1968, the salinity level in the bay exceeded 100‰ killing much fish in the area.

About 21 km^{2} of the bottom of the bay is covered in seagrass; most other parts are dominated by shoal grass (Halodule beaudettei) with occasional rocky outcrops. Scattered parts of the bay, mostly near the mouth, contain the relict serpulid worm reefs, which are composed of the remains of serpulid tube worms. Although some tube worm species still inhabit the bay area and the reefs, they bring no significant contribution to the reef structure. Most reefs are circular or ellipsoid structures between 8 and 40 meters (26 and 131 ft) in diameter and 0.5 to 2 meters (1.6 to 6.6 ft) in height above the sediment. Their total area is about 16 km^{2} (6.2 sq mi), but it is gradually reducing due to erosion.

== Climate ==
The climate has been described as semiarid, subhumid or subtropical, with a very varying precipitation. Tropical storms and hurricanes are common, and they strongly alter the climate and hydrology of the region.

== Flora and fauna ==
The lands around the bay are flat and dominated by grasslands and oak savanna; they are used for agriculture and cattle farming. Common tree and plant species include southern live oak (Quercus virginiana), prickly pear (Opuntia spp.), lime prickly-ash (Zanthoxylum fagara), greenbriar (Smilax spp.), sunflowers (Helianthus spp.), tanglehead (Heteropogon contortus), crinkleawn (Trachypogon spicatus), gulfdune paspalum (Paspalum monostachyum), fringed signalgrass (Urochloa ciliatissima), shrubby oxalis (Oxalis frutescens angustifolia), dayflower (Commelina spp.), Texas lantana (Lantana urticoides), Texas bullnettle (Cnidoscolus texanus), silverleaf nightshade (Solanum elaeagnifolium), crotons (Croton spp.) and Lindheimer tephrosia (Tephrosia lindheimeri).

The waters of the bay contain several species of annelids and 29 species of diatoms. The dominant mollusks are dwarf surf clams and Capitella capitata. The serpulid worm reefs are inhabited by crustaceans, polychaetes and mollusks. Invertebrates are represented by the endemic fiddler crab species Uca subcylindrica, which reside on dry soil, more than 20 meters from bay waters. The bay is a popular destination for recreational angling and is famous for its trophy spotted seatrout. Other species include redfish, threadfin shad (in low salinity periods), pompano, black drum and burrowing goby, etc.

== Bibliography ==
- Richard C. Bartlett (2002). The Laguna Madre of Texas and Tamaulipas. Texas A&M University Press. ISBN 1-58544-133-3.
- David A. McKee; Henry Compton; Janice D. Fechhelm (2008). Fishes of the Texas Laguna Madre: A Guide for Anglers & Naturalists. Texas A&M University Press. ISBN 978-1-60344-028-8.
