= George Washington Williams (naval officer) =

U.S. Navy rear admiral (1869–1925)

- Born: July 30, 1869; Yorkville, South Carolina
- Died: July 18, 1925 (aged 55); Charleston, South Carolina
- Military career
- Allegiance: United States of America
- Branch: United States Navy
- Service years: 1890–1924
- Rank: Rear Admiral
- Units: Commandant, 6th Naval District
- Conflicts: World War I
- Awards: Navy Cross

George Washington Williams (Yorkville, South Carolina, 30 July 1869 – Charleston, South Carolina, 18 July 1925) was a U.S. Navy rear admiral.

== Navy career ==
Williams graduated from the United States Naval Academy in 1890. He served the required two years of sea duty in Pensacola, before he was commissioned an ensign on 1 July 1892.

=== Late 19th century/early 20th century assignments ===
Williams served in a succession of sea and shore billets throughout the 19th century: the former in USS Essex, Columbia, Yankee, Buffalo, Panther, Richmond, and Monongahela; the latter at the Naval Torpedo Station, Newport, Rhode Island. In addition, he served on the staff of the Commander in Chief, Asiatic Fleet, in 1899 and commanded the torpedo boat Bainbridge in 1903 before commanding the 1st Torpedo Boat Flotilla. Reporting to Wisconsin on 5 April 1905, Williams subsequently joined the protected cruiser Chicago for a tour of duty which included participating in relief efforts at San Francisco, California, in the wake of the destructive San Francisco earthquake and fire which destroyed much of that city.

In the years immediately preceding World War I, Williams served as ordnance officer in Montana (Armored Cruiser No. 13); commander of the Atlantic Torpedo Fleet; Inspector of Ordnance in Charge at the Naval Torpedo Station; commanding officer of the cruiser Cleveland and later of battleship Oregon, before he assumed command of Pueblo, (Armored Cruiser No. 7) on 29 April 1917. He admired the Czechoslovak Legion's holding Kazan against the Bolshevik army, and gave a report about it to T. G. Masaryk in America in August 1918.

=== Awarded the Navy Cross ===
Williams — by that time a captain — was awarded the Navy Cross for "distinguished service in the line of his profession" while commanding Pueblo during World War I, as the armored cruiser engaged in the "important, exacting, and hazardous duty of transporting and escorting troops and supplies to European ports through waters infested with enemy submarines and mines."

=== Commanding the USS New Mexico ===
Detached from Pueblo on 6 September 1918, Williams participated in fitting out the new dreadnaught Idaho (Battleship No. 42) and later served ashore in the Office of Naval Intelligence. He took the Naval War College course in 1919 and 1920 before commanding the new dreadnaught New Mexico (BB-40) from 31 May 1921 to 18 May 1922. After detachment from New Mexico, Williams became the senior member of the Pacific Coast section of the Board of Inspection and Survey.

=== Commandant of the 6th Naval District ===
Reaching flag rank on 29 September 1922, Williams served as Chief of Staff to the Commander in Chief, Atlantic Fleet, and later as the Chief of Staff to the Commander in Chief, United States Fleet, when the former command was reorganized. Detached from this duty in the spring of 1923, Williams subsequently served at Charleston, South Carolina, as the commandant of the 6th Naval District before breaking his two-star flag in Concord (CL-10) on 15 September 1924 as Commander, Destroyer Squadrons, Scouting Fleet.

== Final days ==
Rear Admiral Williams died on 18 July 1925 at the Naval Hospital, Charleston, South Carolina.

== Namesakes ==
During World War II, the destroyer escort USS Williams (DE-290) was named for Rear Admiral Williams. Her construction was cancelled in 1944.

In 1944, the destroyer escort USS Williams (DE-372) was named in his honor. She was in commission from 1944 to 1946.
