= USS Maury (DD-100) =

Wickes-class destroyer

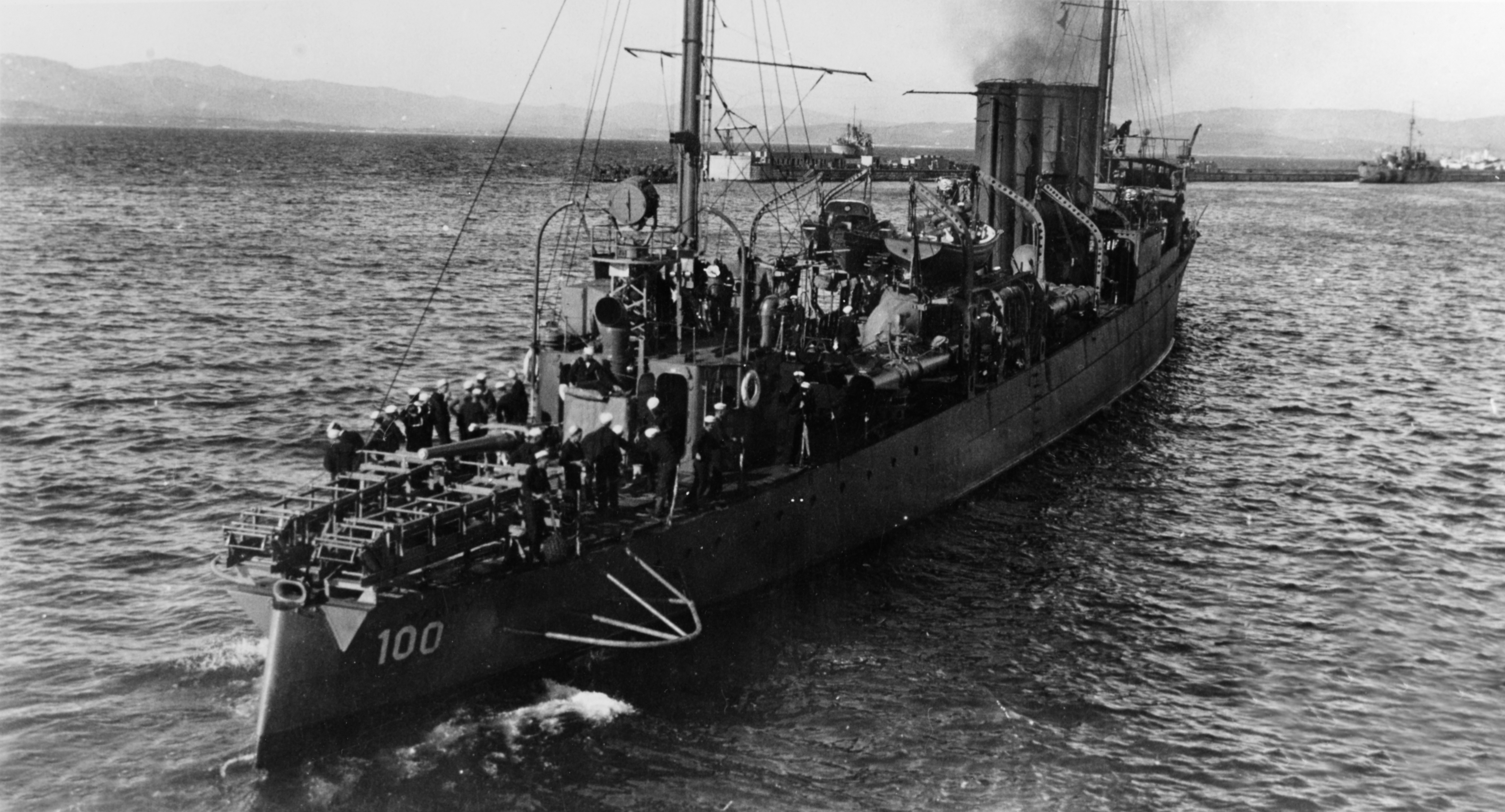
- USS Maury at Gibraltar, circa 1919

History

United States
- Name: Maury
- Namesake: Matthew Fontaine Maury
- Builder: Fore River Shipyard, Quincy, Massachusetts
- Laid down: 4 May 1918
- Launched: 4 July 1918
- Commissioned: 23 September 1918
- Decommissioned: 19 March 1930
- Reclassified: 17 July 1920, DM-5
- Stricken: 22 October 1930
- Fate: Scrapped, 1 May 1934

General characteristics
- Class & type: Wickes-class destroyer
- Displacement: 1,199 tons
- Length: 314 ft 5 in (95.8 m)
- Beam: 31 ft 9 in (9.7 m)
- Draft: 9 ft 2 in (2.8 m)
- Speed: 35 knots (65 km/h; 40 mph)
- Complement: 133 officers and enlisted
- Armament: 4 × 4 in (100 mm) guns; 1 × 3 in (76 mm) gun; 12 × 21 in (533 mm) torpedo tubes

The first USS Maury (DD-100) was a Wickes-class destroyer in the United States Navy during World War I and the years following. She was named in honor of Matthew Fontaine Maury.

== History ==
Maury was laid down on 4 May 1918 by Fore River Shipbuilding Company, Quincy, Massachusetts. The ship was launched on 4 July 1918, sponsored by Miss Anna Hamlin. The destroyer was commissioned on 23 September 1918, Lieutenant Commander John H. Newton in command.

Maury, having completed a United States East Coast shakedown cruise, departed New York City on 12 November 1918 to escort a convoy bound for France. Detached off the Azores, she proceeded to Gibraltar, arriving on 26 November. She cruised in the western Mediterranean Sea until reporting for duty with the Adriatic Detachment at Venice on 18 February 1919. With that squadron for the next five months, she participated in their “umpiring” duties as first Rear Admiral Albert Niblack and then Rear Admiral Adolphus Andrews sought to employ their influence in the political rivalry for the natural harbors of the Adriatic Sea. Primary contenders for this area, particularly Trieste, were Italy and the newly created state of Yugoslavia, itself fraught with internal nationalistic dissension. Secondary postwar problems connected with this duty involved clearing the Adriatic of the multitude of mines which broke away with winds and presented a menace to shipping; distribution of food to the hunger-stricken Balkans; and providing for the ever-growing numbers of refugees.

Maury returned to New York on 25 July and three months later steamed to Philadelphia where she remained, undergoing overhaul, until 24 April 1920. On 17 July she was redesignated DM-5, light minelayer, and after another lengthy stay at Philadelphia reported to Mine Squadron I at Gloucester, Massachusetts, on 23 July 1921. For the next seven years she cruised the waters off the United States East Coast, deploying each winter to join in fleet problems which, with one exception, 1925, took her to the Caribbean Sea. In 1925 she sailed to the Pacific Ocean for a problem involving protective screening, seizing, and occupying of an unfortified anchorage in the vicinity of enemy territory and fueling at sea.

After a winter deployment in waters off Cuba in 1929, Maury spent the summer in the Gulf of Mexico and in September returned to the United States East Coast. On 30 September 1929 she moored at Philadelphia, where she decommissioned on 19 March 1930. Struck from the Naval Register on 22 October 1930, she was sold 17 January 1931 to Boston Iron & Metal Company, Baltimore, Maryland, and was scrapped on 1 May 1934.
