= USS Bainbridge (DD-1) =

Bainbridge-class destroyer

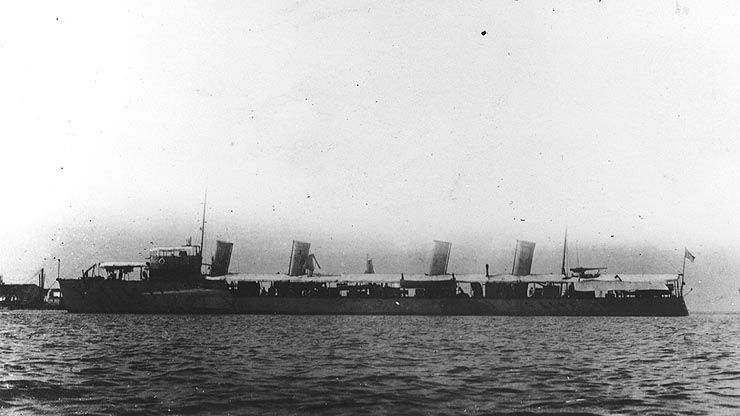
- USS Bainbridge in an Asiatic port c. 1915-1916.

History

United States
- Name: Bainbridge
- Namesake: Commodore William Bainbridge awarded Congressional Gold Medal
- Ordered: 4 May 1898
- Awarded: 1 October 1898
- Builder: Neafie and Levy Ship and Engine Building Company
- Laid down: 15 August 1899
- Launched: 27 August 1901
- Commissioned: 24 November 1902
- Decommissioned: 17 January 1907
- Commissioned: 2 April 1908
- Decommissioned: 24 April 1912
- Commissioned: 1 April 1913
- Decommissioned: 3 July 1919
- Stricken: 15 September 1919
- Fate: Sold for mercantile service, 3 January 1920

General characteristics
- Class & type: Bainbridge-class destroyer
- Displacement: 420 long tons (430 tonnes) (standard load); 631 long tons (641 t) (designed full load); 710.5 long tons (721.9 t) (actual full load)
- Length: 245 ft (74.7 m) (pp); 250 ft (76.2 m) (oa)
- Beam: 23 ft (7.0 m)
- Draft: 6 ft 6 in (1.98 m) (mean); 9 ft 3 in (2.82 m) (max)
- Installed power: 4 × Thornycroft boilers; 8,000 ihp (6,000 kW)
- Propulsion: 2 × triple expansion steam engines; 2 × Propellers
- Speed: 29 kn (54 km/h; 33 mph) (designed speed); 28.45 kn (52.69 km/h; 32.74 mph) (On trials)
- Complement: 4 officers; 69 enlisted men
- Armament: 2 × 3 in (76 mm)/50 caliber guns; 5 × 6-pounder (57 mm (2.2 in)) guns; 2 × 18-inch (450 mm) torpedo tubes

The second USS Bainbridge was the first destroyer, also called "Torpedo-boat destroyers", in the United States Navy and the lead ship of the Bainbridge-class. She was named for William Bainbridge. Bainbridge was commissioned 12 February 1903. She served in the Asiatic Fleet before World War I and served in patrol and convoy duty during the war. She was decommissioned 3 July 1919.

== Construction ==
Bainbridge was laid down on 15 August 1899, by Neafie and Levy Ship and Engine Building Company at their shipyard in Philadelphia, as one of nine ships built to a design by the US Navy's Bureau of Construction and Repair. (Note: Some sources state that Torpedo Boat Destroyers 1–5 comprised the Bainbridge class, while other sources state that four more very similar ships (Torpedo Boat Destroyers 10–13) were also part of the same class.) Although the name-ship of her class, Bainbridge was not the first ship of the class to be laid down or completed. Bainbridge was launched on 27 August 1901. She was placed in reserve commission at Philadelphia on 24 November 1902, with Lieutenant G. W. Williams in command, and towed to Norfolk, Virginia. She was placed in full commission on 12 February 1903. The cost for the hull and machinery was $283,000.

The Bainbridge-class design was intended to combine high speed with improved seaworthiness, and had a raised forecastle instead of the "turtleback" forecastle common in European designs. The hull was 250 ft (76 m) long overall and 245 ft (75 m) between the perpendiculars, with a beam of 23 ft (7.0 m) and a mean draft of 6 ft 6 in (1.98 m). Design displacement was 420 long tons (430 t) and 631 long tons (641 t) full load, although all ships of the class, including Bainbridge were overweight, with Bainbridge displacing 710.5 long tons (721.9 t) full load when completed. Bainbridge was powered by triple expansion steam engines rated at 8,000 ihp (6,000 kW), fed by four Thornycroft boilers which raised steam at 250 psi (1,700 kPa). Design speed was 28 kn (52 km/h; 32 mph), she reached a speed of 28.45 knots (52.69 km/h; 32.74 mph) during sea trials. Four funnels were fitted. Armament consisted of two 3 in (76 mm)/50 caliber guns, five 6-pounder (57 mm (2.2 in)) guns and two 18-inch (457 mm) torpedo tubes.

== Service history ==
=== First commissioning ===
Assigned to the 1st Torpedo Flotilla, she spent the next three months completing trials and outfitting. On 1 June 1903, her flotilla made the trip to Annapolis, Maryland, where it became part of the North Atlantic Fleet's recently formed Coast Squadron. A week later, Bainbridge left Annapolis with the Flotilla and the Coast Squadron and headed south to Newport News, Virginia. The destroyer and her traveling companions set out on 18 June for a summer of drills and exercises in New England waters. Those evolutions consisted of a search problem followed by joint maneuvers with units of the Army, most of which took place along the coast of Maine. Detached from the Coast Squadron on 26 September 1903, the 1st Torpedo Flotilla returned to Hampton Roads to fit out for service on the Asiatic Station.

Following weeks of preparation, Bainbridge stood out of Chesapeake Bay and headed south with the rest of the 1st Torpedo Flotilla and Baltimore on 12 December 1903. After stops in South Carolina at Charleston and Parris Island, the little convoy arrived at Key West, Florida, on 18 December. The auxiliary cruiser Buffalo relieved Baltimore as the flotilla's escort for the remainder of the journey to the Far East.

=== Transfer to the Far East ===
Setting out on 23 December 1903, the flotilla proceeded by way of Puerto Rico and the Canary Islands to Gibraltar where it arrived on 27 January 1904. Resuming the voyage on 31 January, the warships stopped at Algiers for a week in early February. On 9 February, they arrived at Valletta, Malta, where the flotilla and Buffalo had to lay over for a fortnight while Barry went into dry dock to have her propellers repaired after damaging them while mooring. Transiting the Suez Canal on 26 February, the flotilla stayed at Port Suez, Egypt, until the 29th when it headed down the Red Sea to Aden. In March, Bainbridge and her companions visited Bombay, India, and Colombo, Ceylon. They made the last stop before reaching their destination, a port call at Singapore, between 3 and 9 April. The flotilla then made the relatively short final leg of the voyage, from Singapore to Cavite in the Philippines, on 9 April 1904.

=== Far East duty ===
Their successful completion of the four-month voyage from the east coast to the Orient did much to prove torpedo-boat destroyers capable of extended operations at sea with the fleet. The manner in which she and her colleagues served on the Asiatic Station, alternating between duty in Chinese waters and service in the Philippines, further substantiated their utility and hinted at their ultimate versatility. Less than seven weeks after arriving in the Philippines, Bainbridge led the flotilla, she wore the flotilla commander's flag, out of Manila Bay on its way to its first tour of duty in China. The warships spent June and early July at Hong Kong, making the passage from Hong Kong to Shanghai on 11 July. For the rest of the summer, Bainbridge and the other destroyers joined the Asiatic Fleet's Battleship Squadron in gun and torpedo drills off the Chinese coast and spent much time showing the flag in Chinese ports.

The latter employment, supporting American diplomatic presence in China, had taken on an increasing importance as the Imperial Chinese government's effectiveness degenerated in the course of the nineteenth century and during the early years of the twentieth century. Foreign governments felt compelled to send naval forces to provide protection for their nationals conducting all sorts of business in China but then used this need as a pretext to extort quasi-colonial concessions from the prostrate nation. As a result, the Great Powers entered into a fierce competition for political and economic advantage in China. Bainbridge and her flotilla-mates served as a part of American diplomacy's effort both to maintain Chinese sovereignty and to keep access open to American interests in China.

=== Russo-Japanese War ===
This, her first, tour of duty in China coincided with one of the several occasions when the friction over benefits in China created enough heat to burst into the flames of war. Earlier in the year, war between Japan and Russia began with Japan's attack on the Russian squadron at Port Arthur. Unable to bottle the Russian ships up securely in Port Arthur or to lure them out to their destruction, the Japanese set about investing their base. After several months, the siege forced the Russian squadron to attempt the run to Vladivostok on 10 August 1904. Japanese mines sank or damaged several Russian ships; and, in the ensuing confusion, some Russian ships were separated from the main body before it retired back into Port Arthur to its ultimate doom. Thus, Bainbridge found herself at Shanghai when Askold, one of the refugees from Admiral Vitgeft's squadron, sought sanctuary there. When her pursuers sent a destroyer into the Yangtze to reconnoiter Askold, Rear Admiral Yates Stirling dispatched Bainbridge to deter the probe and to discourage a repetition of the high-handed Japanese behavior at Chefoo where they had violated international law by seizing another refugee from Vitgeft's squadron after she had interned herself in the neutral port. The ploy succeeded. The Japanese chose to allow Askold to intern herself, and the Russian commander wisely did so.

Following that incident, Bainbridge spent another two months in Chinese waters before departing Shanghai on 4 October. She and her flotilla-mates then passed three weeks at Hong Kong before resuming the voyage to the Philippines on 26 October. The destroyer reached Cavite on 28 October and spent the remainder of 1904 and the first few weeks of 1905 engaged in local operations, mostly torpedo drills and gunnery practice. In March 1905, Bainbridge and the destroyer flotilla left the Philippines with the Battleship Squadron for dry docking in Hong Kong. She returned to Manila with those units early in April, and the destroyers received orders to head "south to patrol the coast of Palawan and the waters north of Borneo...." These orders came in response to reports that Russian Rear Admiral Zinovy Rozhestvensky's Baltic Fleet had finally set sail after a three-month layover at Madagascar to complete its voyage to join the war in the Far East. Bainbridge and her colleagues spent the next few months guarding the American Philippines against neutrality violations by the Russians and the Japanese. This danger effectively evaporated with the nearly complete destruction of the Russian Baltic Fleet by Admiral Tōgō Heihachirō at the Battle of Tsushima on 27 and 28 May.

=== "Show the flag" – China 1905–1906 ===
On 1 July 1905, Bainbridge stood out of Manila Bay with the flotilla to accompany the battleship and cruiser squadrons on the annual northern redeployment to conduct summer exercises and to "show the flag" in Chinese waters. The first portion of the normal summer drills and port visits went off as usual; but, early in August, China displayed another burst of nationalism when a boycott was organized in response to the Chinese exclusion policy then in effect on the American west coast. Initially, this brought little disruption to the Asiatic Fleet's routine. The warships carried out their exercises and visited Chinese ports as usual. The destroyers even returned south to the Philippines in October according to custom. Only then came the break with normal routine. Instead of passing the winter months in the Philippines, Bainbridge and Barry spent just six weeks there before returning north to China late in November after President Theodore Roosevelt chose to brandish the "Big Stick".

The mission lasted through the winter with the destroyers joining other ships of the Asiatic Fleet in repeated calls at Chinese ports in a vigorous display of the naval might of the United States. By the spring of 1906, the Chinese national feeling against the United States had subsided so that, though Bainbridge and Barry remained in Chinese waters and continued to "show the flag," they were also able to resume many of the normal training evolutions more typical of their annual summer sojourns in Chinese waters. Her stay in northern waters thus continued through the summer and into the fall. At the end of September, Bainbridge and Barry left Chefoo, China, in company with Chattanooga to return to the Philippines for the first time since the previous fall. After stopping off at Amoy, China, from 3 to 8 October, the warships arrived back at Cavite on the 10th.

=== First decommissioning ===
On 9 January 1907, Bainbridge was placed out of commission at the Cavite Navy Yard to undergo repairs to her machinery. Problems with the boilers in the new destroyers had been reported as early as 1905 when the Asiatic Fleet commander's report alluded to the need to retube them as soon as circumstances allowed. The repairs appear to have staggered, no doubt to allow some of the flotilla to remain active and possibly because of limited yard facilities. Three of them; Chauncey, Dale and Decatur had been out of commission at Cavite since early December 1905. Presumably, Bainbridge's decommissioning date had been arranged to nearly coincide with Chauncey's return to active duty on 12 January 1907. Bainbridge remained out of service at Cavite for nearly 14 months before being recommissioned on 2 April 1908, Ens. Joseph V. Ogan in command.

=== Second commissioning − Xinhai Revolution ===
For three years after her return to active service, the warship carried out a normal routine for Asiatic Fleet destroyers unburdened by extraordinary diplomatic demands. This meant drilling and patrolling in the Philippines each winter followed by exercises conducted in Chinese waters in the summer. Near the end of the 1911 summer cruise, however, events transpired to upset this pattern. Disturbances in China in September and early October 1911 led to an anti-Manchu revolt which grew into the revolution that toppled the dynasty in 1912. This sequence of events kept Bainbridge and the other destroyers from returning to the Philippines from north China in the fall of 1911. Instead, they remained in Chinese waters, where they were soon joined by every available Asiatic Fleet ship, to protect Americans and their interests in China through the winter and into the spring of 1912.

=== Second decommissioning ===
Still, by the spring of 1912, the remarkable restraint that both factions in the struggle for power in China displayed toward foreign lives and rights allowed much of the recently assembled foreign naval might to stand down. Accordingly, though some of her sisters stayed on station in the Yangtze River, Bainbridge headed back to the Philippines. Her return coincided with, and may have been caused in part by, a widespread manpower shortage that forced a number of torpedo boats and destroyers into a form of caretaker status. Upon her return from China, Bainbridge was placed in reserve on 24 April 1912.

=== Third commissioning ===
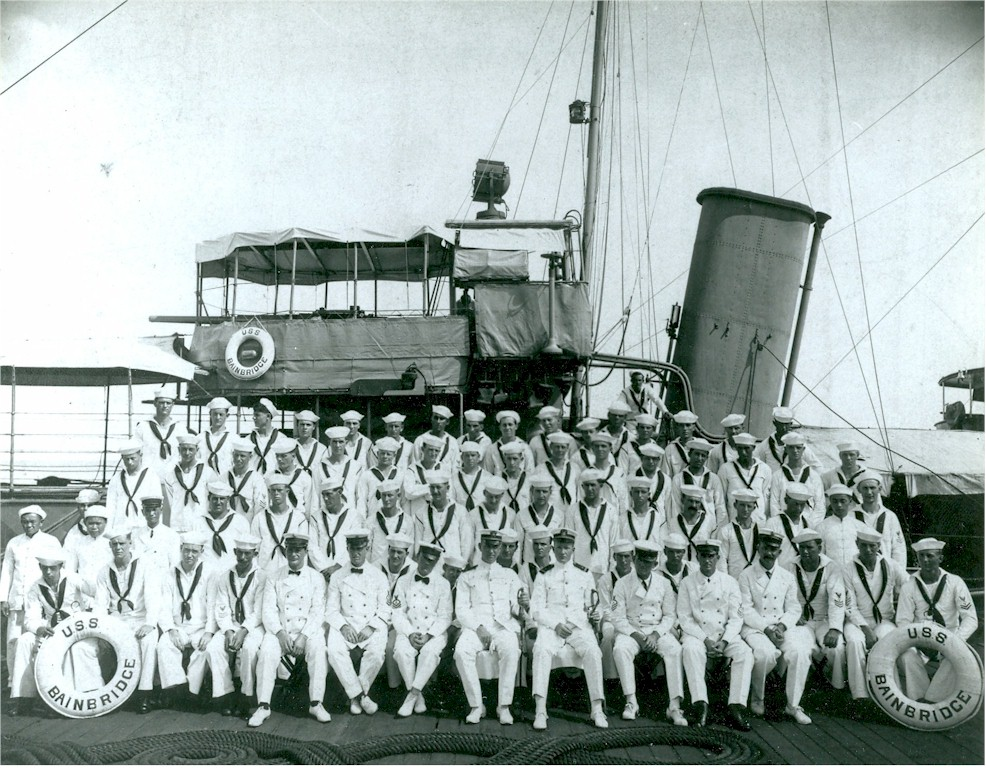
USS Bainbridge (Destroyer # 1) Ship's officers and men pose on a pier, alongside Bainbridge, c. 1914–1916, while she was serving in Asiatic waters. Note life rings and neatly arranged line.

Bainbridge remained in this semi-active state for almost a year, resuming full active duty on 1 April 1913, with Lieutenant (junior grade), later Admiral, Raymond A. Spruance in command.

Though she became fully active once again, complications on the international scene still held her back from the old comfortable routine. In mid-April, the diplomatic crisis over the California Alien Land Law of 1913 arose with Japan and forestalled the usual summer deployment to Chinese waters. Instead, Bainbridge and the rest of the flotilla stayed close by Luzon as part of the defenses for Manila Bay in the event of a war. The situation eased considerably by the end of May, but the destroyers kept close to their Philippine base all during the summer and fall of 1913 and through the winter of 1913 and 1914. Circumstances seemed to change later because Bainbridge and her division mates sailed off on the familiar cruise to north China in the summer of 1914. That tour of duty, however, did not signal a return to the schedule of old but, instead, proved to be the last of those regular summer journeys north in the Far East. In 1915, Bainbridge made a short deployment to Shanghai but it came late in the fall, November and December, rather than in the summer and it was her last visit to China. She and her sisters spent all of 1916 patrolling in the Philippines and continued so engaged during the first three months of 1917. Even the entry of the United States into World War I in the spring of 1917, which found Bainbridge moored at Cebu in the southern islands, did not disrupt her schedule of Philippine operations immediately. Only in mid-summer 1917 did orders arrive sending her and her sisters to duty in European waters.

=== World War I ===
On 1 August 1917, Bainbridge stood out of Cavite with the rest of her division and embarked on the long voyage to Europe. She steamed by way of Borneo, Singapore, Ceylon, and India, making extended pauses at Columbo, Ceylon, where the division had to wait for Barry to repair a damaged propeller, and at Bombay, India, before reaching the southern terminus of the Suez Canal on 23 September. The division transited the canal on 25 September arriving at Port Said, Egypt, early in the afternoon. After a week at Port Said, Bainbridge headed across the Mediterranean with the division. Although they had yet to reach their base of operations, the destroyers really began their war service upon entering the Mediterranean Sea where German and Austro-Hungarian submarines based on the Dalmatian coast were highly active. Bainbridge, in fact, claimed her only submarine contact just a week after departing Port Said on her way to Gibraltar. She had steamed with the division to Malta, arriving in Valletta on 6 October and leaving again the following day escorting some ships to Naples. On the 8th, her lookouts spied a U-boat on the surface stalking one of her charges, SS Camilla Rickmers, and Bainbridge charged to the attack. Before she could close the target to within gun range, however, the submarine submerged and escaped. On the 9th, Bainbridge and her division mates saw the merchant ships safely into Naples where they stood down for almost a week. She and her colleagues stood out of Naples on the last leg of their voyage on 15 October and reached their new base at Gibraltar on the 20th.

The warship served nine months in the European war zone based at Gibraltar escorting Allied shipping into and out of the Mediterranean Sea and between various points on the western Mediterranean littoral. On 15 July 1918, Bainbridge departed Gibraltar in company with Nashville to return to the United States. Sailing by way of the Azores and Bermuda, the two warships reached Charleston, S.C., on 3 August. She operated out of Charleston, carrying out a variety of patrol and escort missions, until 27 November when she set out for Boston. The destroyer served along the northeastern coast until the summer of 1919.

=== Final decommissioning and fate ===
On 3 July 1919, Bainbridge was decommissioned at the Philadelphia Navy Yard, and her name was struck from the Naval Vessel Register on 15 September 1919. She was sold to Henry A. Hitner's Sons Company, of Philadelphia, on 3 January 1920 for conversion to mercantile service as a fruit carrier.

== Noteworthy commanding officers ==
- Lieutenant George Washington Williams (24 November 1902 – 10 August 1904) (Later Rear Admiral)
- Lieutenant Walton R. Sexton (10 August 1904 – 10 March 1905) (Later Rear admiral)
- Lieutenant Clark H. Woodward (10 March 1905 – 17 January 1907) (Later Rear admiral)
- Lieutenant Raymond A. Spruance (1 April 1913 – 8 June 1914) (Later Admiral) – The destroyers Spruance (DD-963), lead ship of the Spruance class of destroyers, and Spruance (DDG-111), 61st ship of the Arleigh Burke class of destroyers, were named in his honor.

== Honors and awards ==
- World War I Victory Medal

== Bibliography ==
=== Books ===
- Chesneau, Roger; Kolesnik, Eugene M. (1979). Conway's All The World's Fighting Ships 1860–1905. London: Conway Maritime Press. ISBN 0-85177-133-5.
- Friedman, Norman (1982). U.S. Destroyers: An Illustrated History. Annapolis, Maryland: Naval Institute Press. ISBN 0-87021-733-X.
- Osborne, Eric W. (2005). Destroyers: An Illustrated History of their Impact. Santa Barbara, California: ABC-CLIO. ISBN 1-85109-484-9.
- Schmidt, Carl H. (1921). "Navy Yearbook". Senate Documents No. 302. 11. Washington, D.C.: U.S. Government Printing Office: 763.

=== Online resources ===
- Mann, Raymond A. (22 June 2015). "Bainbridge II (Torpedo-boat Destroyer No. 1)". Dictionary of American Naval Fighting Ships. Naval History and Heritage Command.
- Ships' Data, U. S. Naval Vessels, 1911-. US Naval Department. 1 January 1914.
