= Walton R. Sexton =

American Navy admiral (1876–1943)

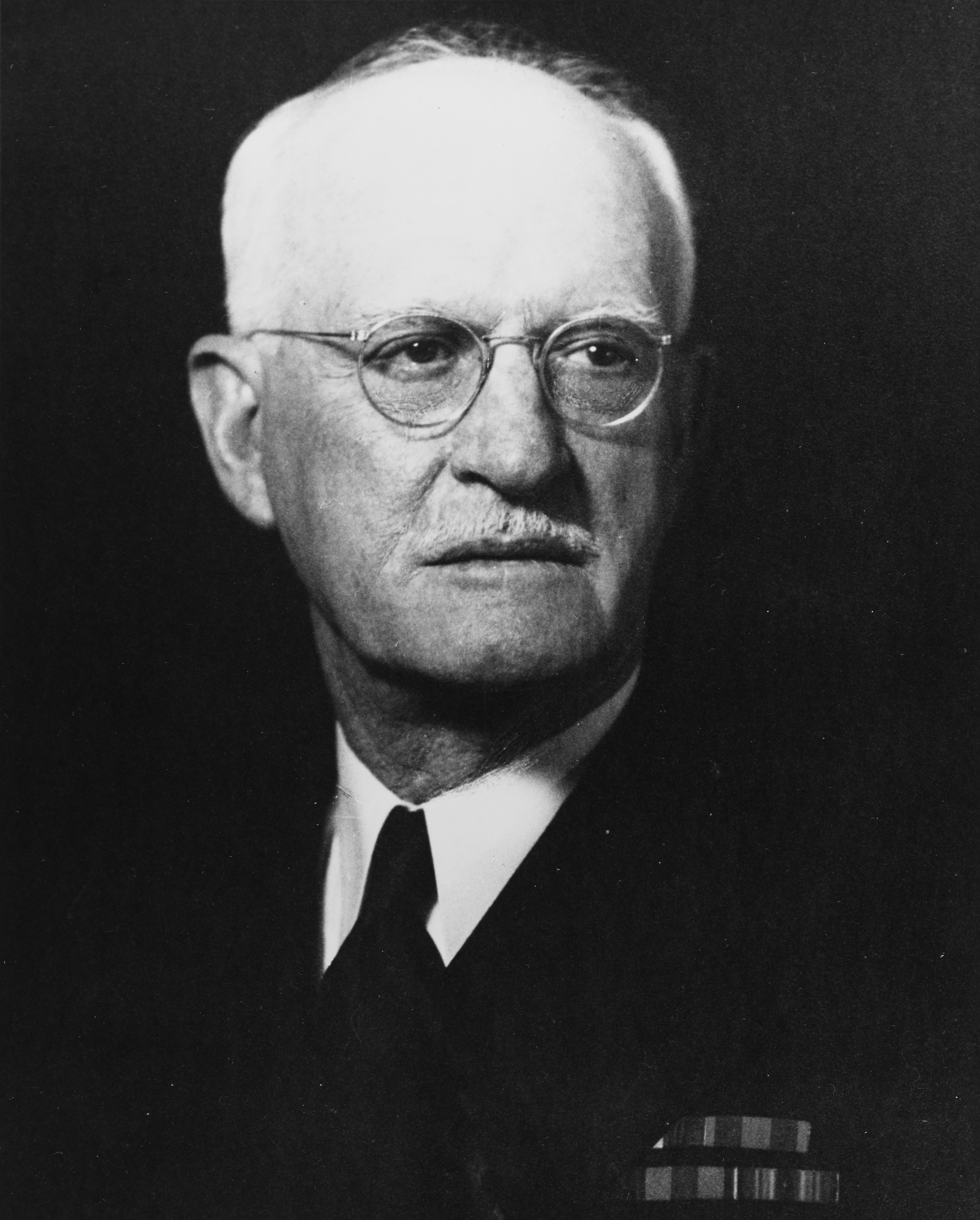
- Born: 13 September 1876; Monmouth, Illinois, U.S.
- Died: 9 September 1943 (aged 66); Bethesda, Maryland, U.S.
- Military career
- Allegiance: United States of America
- Branch: United States Navy
- Service years: 1897–1943
- Rank: Rear Admiral
- Commands: Destroyers, Battle Force; Battleships, Battle Force; Destroyers, Scouting Fleet; USS Utah; USS Frederick; USS Vesuvius; USS Bainbridge
- Conflicts: Spanish–American War; Philippine–American War; World War I World War II
- Awards: Navy Cross

Walton Roswell Sexton (13 September 1876 – 9 September 1943) was a United States Navy officer. He temporarily served as a vice admiral in command of Battleships, Battle Force from July 1933 to June 1934. Sexton retired as a rear admiral on 1 October 1940, but remained on active duty because of World War II until his death in 1943.

== Early life and education ==
Sexton was born and raised in Monmouth, Illinois. He entered the United States Naval Academy in 1893 and graduated on 4 June 1897. Sexton later attended the Naval War College in 1915.

== Career ==
After graduation from the Naval Academy, Sexton served in the Spanish–American War and the Philippine–American War. He commanded the destroyer Bainbridge from August 1904 to March 1905. In 1906, Sexton was given command of the cruiser Vesuvius. In July 1909, he was promoted to lieutenant commander.

In 1913, he served as flag secretary on the staff of Rear Admiral Charles J. Badger aboard the battleship Wyoming. In August 1916, he was promoted to commander. During World War I, Sexton received a temporary promotion to captain and served on the staff of the commander-in-chief of U.S. naval forces in European waters, earning the Navy Cross.

After the war in October 1919, Sexton replaced Rear Admiral Harry S. Knapp as the U.S. naval attaché in London. He was then given command of the armored cruiser Frederick from November 1920 to February 1922. In June 1921, his promotion to captain was made permanent. Sexton served as the commanding officer of the battleship Utah from April to October 1925.

Sexton was given command of Destroyers, Scouting Fleet in 1929 and promoted to rear admiral in March 1930. In 1931, he became an Assistant Chief of Naval Operations. In 1933, Sexton was named commander of Battleships, Battle Force and given the temporary rank of vice admiral. From 1934 to 1937, he reverted to his permanent rank of rear admiral and served on the Navy General Board. From 1937 to 1939, Sexton was commander of Destroyers, Battle Force.

From 1939 to 1942, Sexton served as chairman of the Navy General Board. He retired after reaching the age of sixty-four in September 1940, he was then originally slated to be replaced by Rear Admiral John W. Greenslade but was then personally asked to stay on by President Franklin D. Roosevelt. Unlike many senior naval officers with whom he served, Sexton was not advanced to vice admiral on the retired list because he had not served a full calendar year at that rank. In August 1942, he was replaced as chairman by Rear Admiral Arthur J. Hepburn but continued to serve as a member of the General Board.

As a Philippine–American War veteran, Sexton served as Grand Paramount Carabao of the Military Order of the Carabao from December 1941 to December 1942. He died at the Naval Medical Center in Bethesda, Maryland on 9 September 1943 and was interred at Arlington National Cemetery two days later.

== Personal ==
Sexton was the son of William Harvey Sexton and Marian (Burlingim) Sexton.
