= Lunga Point =

Landform of Guadalcanal Island

Coordinates: 9°25′S 160°02′E

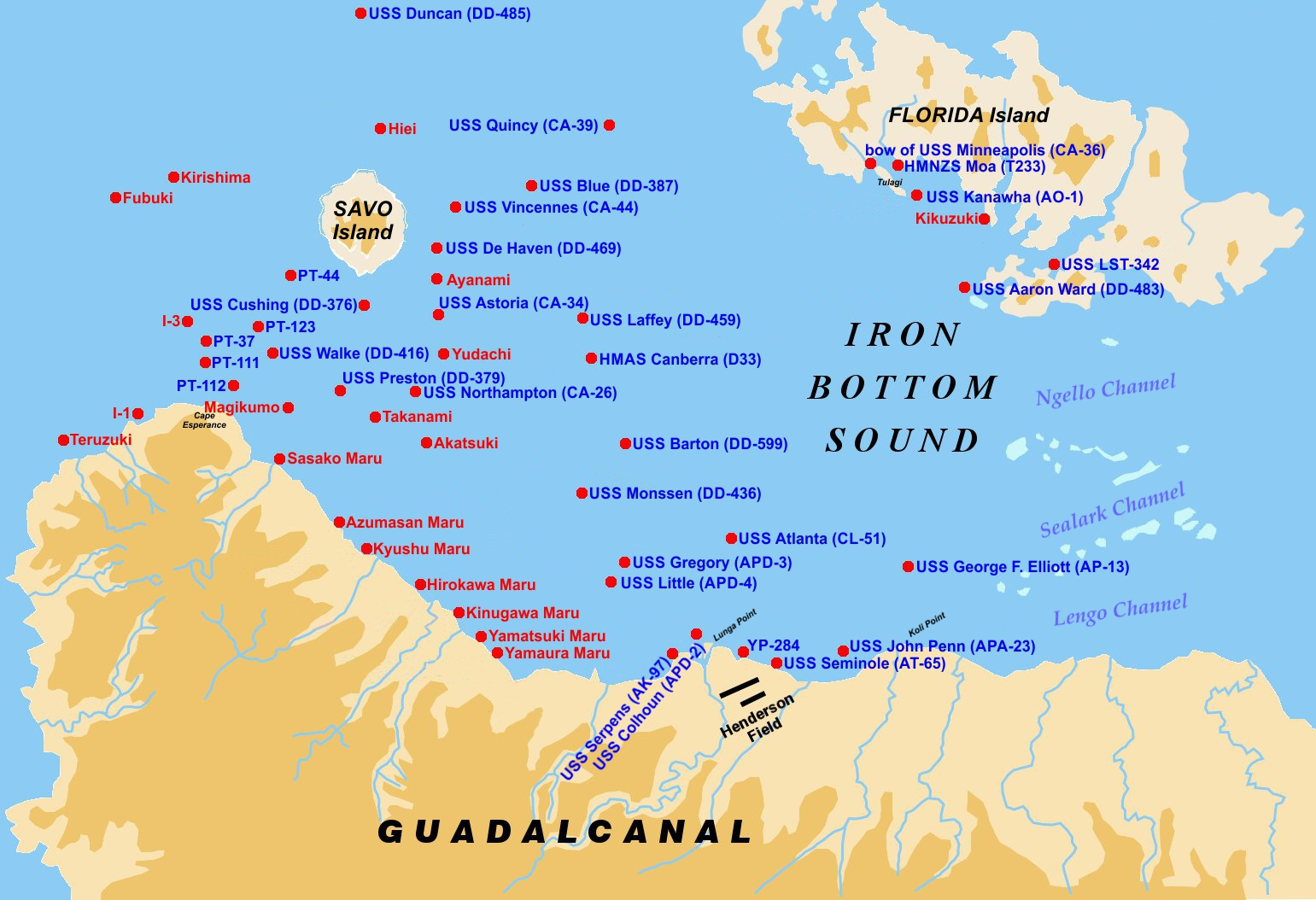
Chart of Ironbottom Sound and surrounding waters and islands.

Lunga Point is a promontory on the northern coast of Guadalcanal, the site of a naval battle during World War II. It was also the name of a nearby airfield, later named Henderson Field. USS Lunga Point is also the name of a United States Navy escort carrier that operated in World War II.

Eleven thousand US Marines landed at Lunga Point on August 7, 1942, in order to capture the airfield being constructed by the Imperial Japanese Navy before it could become operational, beginning the Guadalcanal Campaign.
