= USS Lunga Point =

Casablanca-class escort carrier of the US Navy

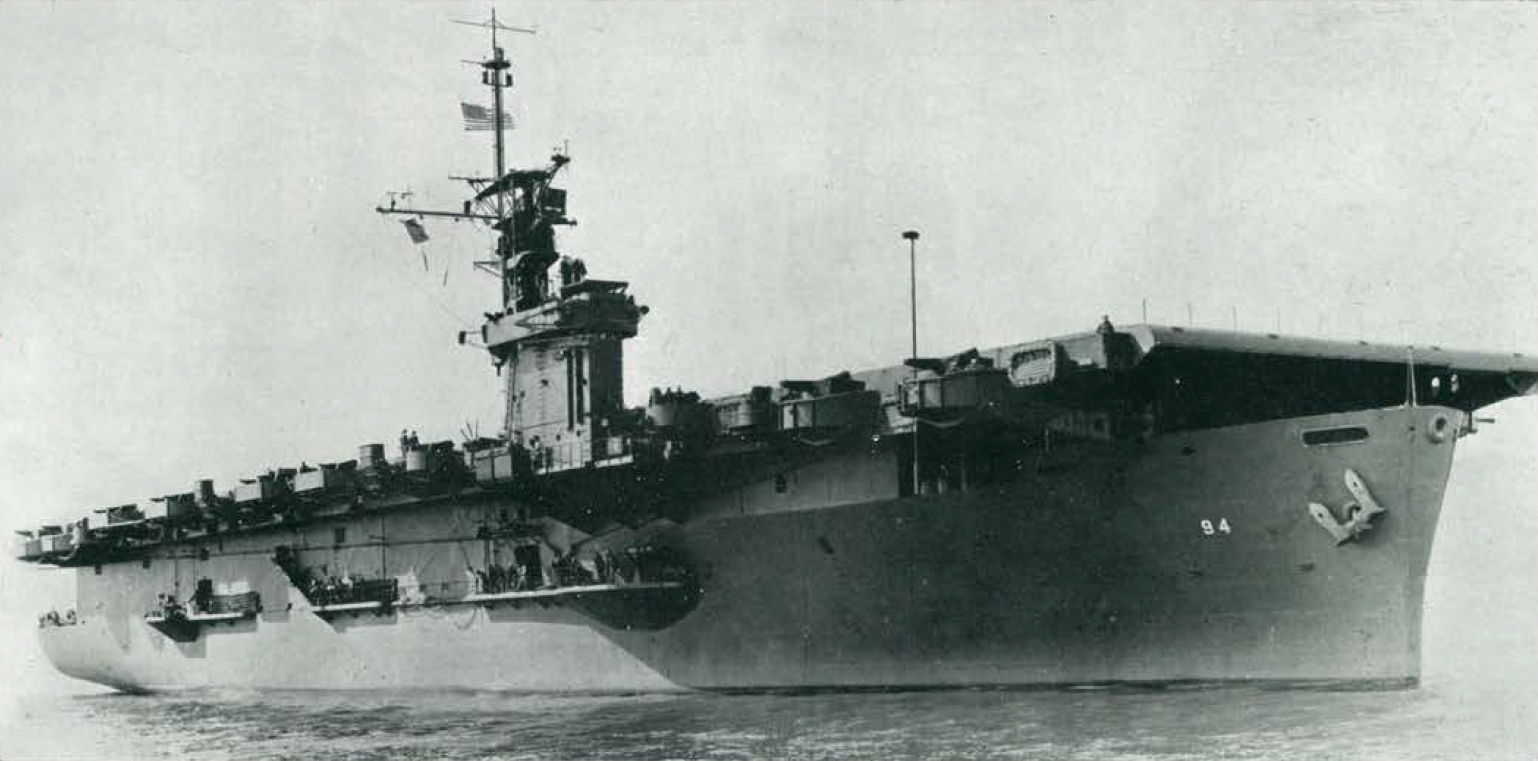
- USS Lunga Point (CVE-94)

History

United States
- Name: Alazon Bay (1944); Lunga Point (1944–1960)
- Namesake: Alazan Bay, Texas; Lunga Point, Guadalcanal, Solomon Islands
- Ordered: as a Type S4-S2-BB3 hull, MCE hull 1132
- Awarded: 18 June 1942
- Builder: Kaiser Shipbuilding Company, Vancouver, Washington
- Laid down: 19 January 1944
- Launched: 11 April 1944
- Commissioned: 14 May 1944
- Decommissioned: 24 October 1946
- Stricken: 1 April 1960
- Identification: Hull symbol: CVE-94
- Honors and awards: Presidential Unit Citation, 5 Battle Stars
- Fate: Sold for scrap on 3 August 1960

General characteristics
- Class & type: Casablanca-class escort carrier
- Displacement: 8,188 long tons (8,319 t) (standard); 10,902 long tons (11,077 t) (full load)
- Length: 512 ft 3 in (156.13 m) (oa); 490 ft (150 m) (wl); 474 ft (144 m) (fd)
- Beam: 65 ft 2 in (19.86 m); 108 ft (33 m) (extreme width)
- Draft: 20 ft 9 in (6.32 m) (max)
- Installed power: 4 × Babcock & Wilcox boilers; 9,000 shp (6,700 kW)
- Propulsion: 2 × Skinner Unaflow reciprocating steam engines; 2 × screws
- Speed: 19 knots (35 km/h; 22 mph)
- Range: 10,240 nmi (18,960 km; 11,780 mi) at 15 kn (28 km/h; 17 mph)
- Complement: Total: 910 – 916 officers and men; Embarked Squadron: 50 – 56; Ship's Crew: 860
- Armament: As designed: 1 × 5 in (127 mm)/38 cal dual-purpose gun; 4 × twin 40 mm (1.57 in) Bofors anti-aircraft guns; 12 × 20 mm (0.79 in) Oerlikon anti-aircraft cannons; Varied, ultimate armament: 1 × 5 in (127 mm)/38 cal dual-purpose gun; 8 × twin 40 mm (1.57 in) Bofors anti-aircraft guns; 20 × 20 mm (0.79 in) Oerlikon anti-aircraft cannons
- Aircraft carried: 27
- Aviation facilities: 1 × catapult; 2 × elevators

Service record
- Part of: United States Pacific Fleet (1944–1946), Pacific Reserve Fleet (1946–1960)
- Commanders: Captain G.A.T. Washburn
- Operations: Philippines campaign, Invasion of Iwo Jima, Battle of Okinawa

USS Lunga Point (CVE-94), originally named Alazon Bay, was a Casablanca-class escort carrier of the United States Navy. She was named for Lunga Point on the northern coast of Guadalcanal, the site of a naval battle during World War II. The ship notably participated in support of the landings on Iwo Jima and Okinawa. Post war, the ship was decommissioned in 1946, before becoming part of the Pacific Reserve Fleet. In 1960, the ship was struck from the Navy list and broken up.

== Design and description ==
A side profile of the design of Thetis Bay.

Lunga Point was a Casablanca-class escort carrier, the most numerous type of aircraft carriers ever built. Built to stem heavy losses during the Battle of the Atlantic, they came into service in late 1943, by which time the U-boat threat was already in retreat. Although some did see service in the Atlantic, the majority were utilized in the Pacific, ferrying aircraft, providing logistics support, and conducting close air support for the island-hopping campaigns. The Casablanca-class carriers were built on the standardized Type S4-S2-BB3 hull, a lengthened variant of the Doyen-class hull, and specifically designed to be mass-produced using welded prefabricated sections. This allowed them to be produced at unprecedented speeds: the final ship of her class, Munda, was delivered to the Navy just 101 days after the laying of her keel.

Lunga Point was 512 ft 3 in (156.13 m) long overall (490 ft (150 m) at the waterline), had a beam of 65 ft 2 in (19.86 m), and a draft of 20 ft 9 in (6.32 m). She displaced 8,188 long tons (8,319 t) standard, which increased to 10,902 long tons (11,077 t) with a full load. To carry out flight operations, the ship had a 257 ft (78 m) hangar deck and a 474 ft (144 m) flight deck. Her compact size necessitated the installation of an aircraft catapult at her bow, and there were two aircraft elevators to facilitate movement of aircraft between the flight and hangar deck: one each fore and aft.

She was powered by four Babcock & Wilcox Express D boilers that raised 285 psi (1,970 kPa) of steam at 577 °F (303 °C). The steam generated by these boilers fed two Skinner Unaflow reciprocating steam engines, delivering 9,000 hp (6,700 kW) to two propeller shafts. This allowed her to reach speeds of 19 kn (35 km/h; 22 mph), with a cruising range of 10,240 nmi (18,960 km; 11,780 mi) at 15 kn (28 km/h; 17 mph). For armament, one 5 in (127 mm)/38 caliber dual-purpose gun was mounted on the stern. Additional anti-aircraft defense was provided by eight Bofors 40 mm (1.57 in) anti-aircraft guns in single mounts and twelve Oerlikon 20 mm (0.79 in) cannons mounted around the perimeter of the deck. By 1945, Casablanca-class carriers had been modified to carry twenty Oerlikon cannons and sixteen Bofors guns; the doubling of the latter was accomplished by putting them into twin mounts. Sensors onboard consisted of a SG surface-search radar and a SK air-search radar.

Although Casablanca-class escort carriers were intended to function with a crew of 860 and an embarked squadron of 50 to 56, the exigencies of wartime often necessitated the inflation of the crew count. They were designed to operate with 27 aircraft, but the hangar deck could accommodate much more during transport or training missions.

During the Philippines campaign, she carried 14 FM-2 fighters and 12 TBM-3 torpedo bombers, for a total of 26 aircraft. However, during the Iwo Jima campaign and the Okinawa campaign, she carried 18 FM-2 fighters, 11 TBM-3 torpedo bombers, and a TBM-3P reconnaissance plane, for a total of 30 aircraft.

== Construction ==
Her construction was awarded to Kaiser Shipbuilding Company, Vancouver, Washington, under a Maritime Commission contract, on 18 June 1942, under the name Alazon Bay (a misspelling of Alazan Bay, located in Kleberg County, Texas, as part of a tradition which named escort carriers after bays or sounds). She was laid down on 19 January 1944 under a Maritime Commission contract, MC hull 1131, by Kaiser Shipbuilding Company of Vancouver, Washington. She was launched on 11 April 1944; sponsored by Mrs. Mary Elizabeth McKay. She was renamed Lunga Point, and was transferred to the United States Navy and commissioned on 14 May 1944, Captain G. A. T. Washburn in command.

== Service history ==
=== World War II ===
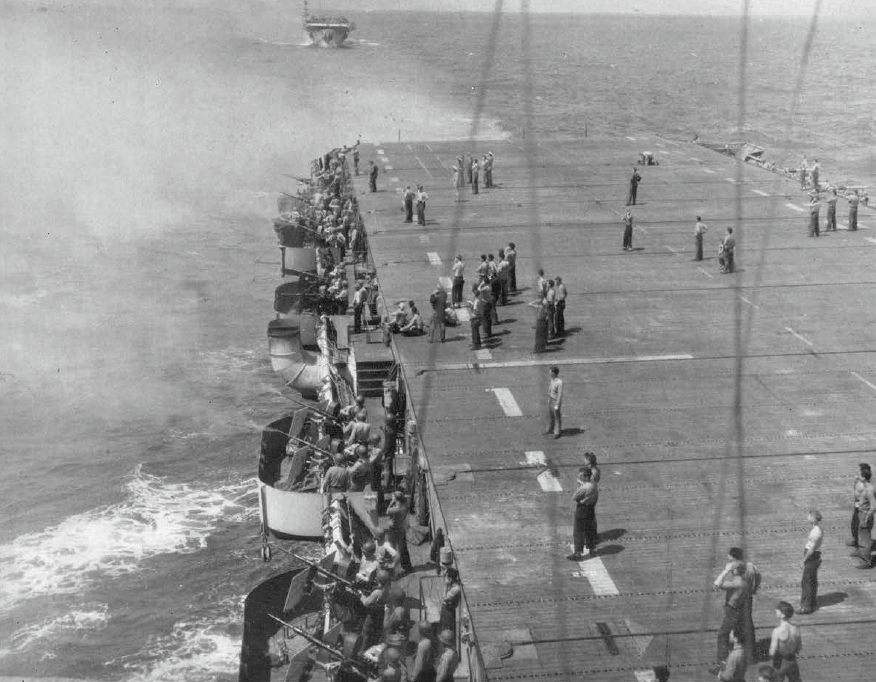
Gunnery drills aboard Lunga Point in 1944

Following a period of brief training in the months following her commissioning, Lunga Point sailed for the Pacific to ferry United States Army bombers to New Guinea and to bring damaged P-47 Thunderbolts back to the United States. Upon return, she became a unit of Carrier Division 29 (CarDiv 29), a component of Admiral Thomas C. Kinkaid's 7th Fleet, alongside her fellow sister ships Makin Island, Bismarck Sea, Salamaua, and Hoggatt Bay. She departed San Diego, California, on 16 October to participate in the Leyte Gulf operations, touching Pearl Harbor, Eniwetok, and Kossol Roads en route. From 13 to 22 November, she provided air cover for transports and surface units engaged in the campaign. Relieved on the 23rd, she sailed to Manus Island, Admiralty Islands, to prepare for the Luzon campaign.

==== Philippine Sea ====
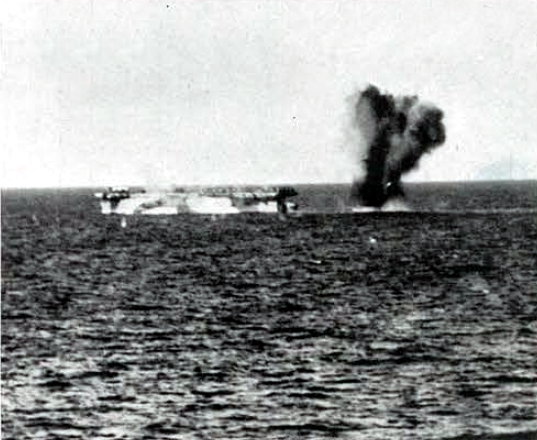
A Japanese kamikaze plane crashes aft of Lunga Point off the Philippines on 4 January 1945

Lunga Point sailed on 27 December from Manus to supply air support for 6th Army landing operations at Lingayen Gulf. En route, on 4 January 1945, at 17:00, approximately 15 Japanese planes were picked up on radar, 45 miles (72 km) west of the task group, and approaching quickly. These planes split into two groups, one group heading towards the rear of the task group, whilst the other continued on its course towards the center. Albeit fighters from the carrier group was scrambled, false radar signals hampered their efforts to intercept, and the only successful interception was when P-47 fighters intercepted two enemy planes, shooting down one. The other plane escaped, and is believed to be the kamikaze which would attack Ommaney Bay. A lack of radar contacts led the task group to believe that the enemy planes had called off their attack.

At 17:12, a Yokosuka P1Y dove onto Ommaney Bay, rupturing the fire mains and sparking a fire which quickly became untenable. She quickly sank, with the loss of 95 crewmen. Minutes after Ommaney Bay was hit, a second kamikaze dove towards Lunga Point. Gunners on the battleship California and cruiser Portland, joined with anti-aircraft fire on Lunga Point, tore the kamikaze apart. The flaming wreckage passed over her, about a hundred feet above her stern, showering her deck with metal fragments, which slightly wounded two men.

For the next few days, her task group fought their way through 14 enemy attacks, the majority of them kamikazes, most of which were repelled through excellent fighter cover and anti-aircraft fire. During this running engagement, Louisville, Stafford, and Manila Bay were all damaged by kamikazes. She arrived off Lingayen Gulf on 6 January, commencing 11 days of intensive air support during which time her aircraft flew an average of 41 sorties a day. On 17 January, the support carriers were withdrawn and returned to Ulithi.

==== Iwo Jima ====
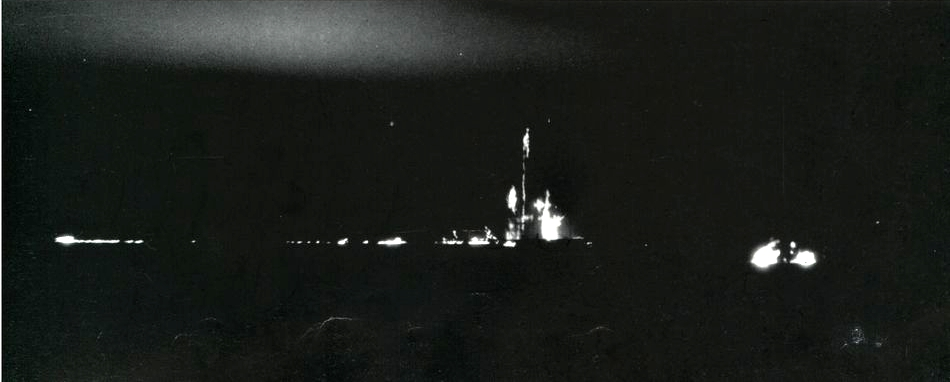
Lunga Point burning from the third kamikaze, on 21 February 1945, which sparked a brief gasoline fire. The damage from the kamikaze attacks proved to be minimal.

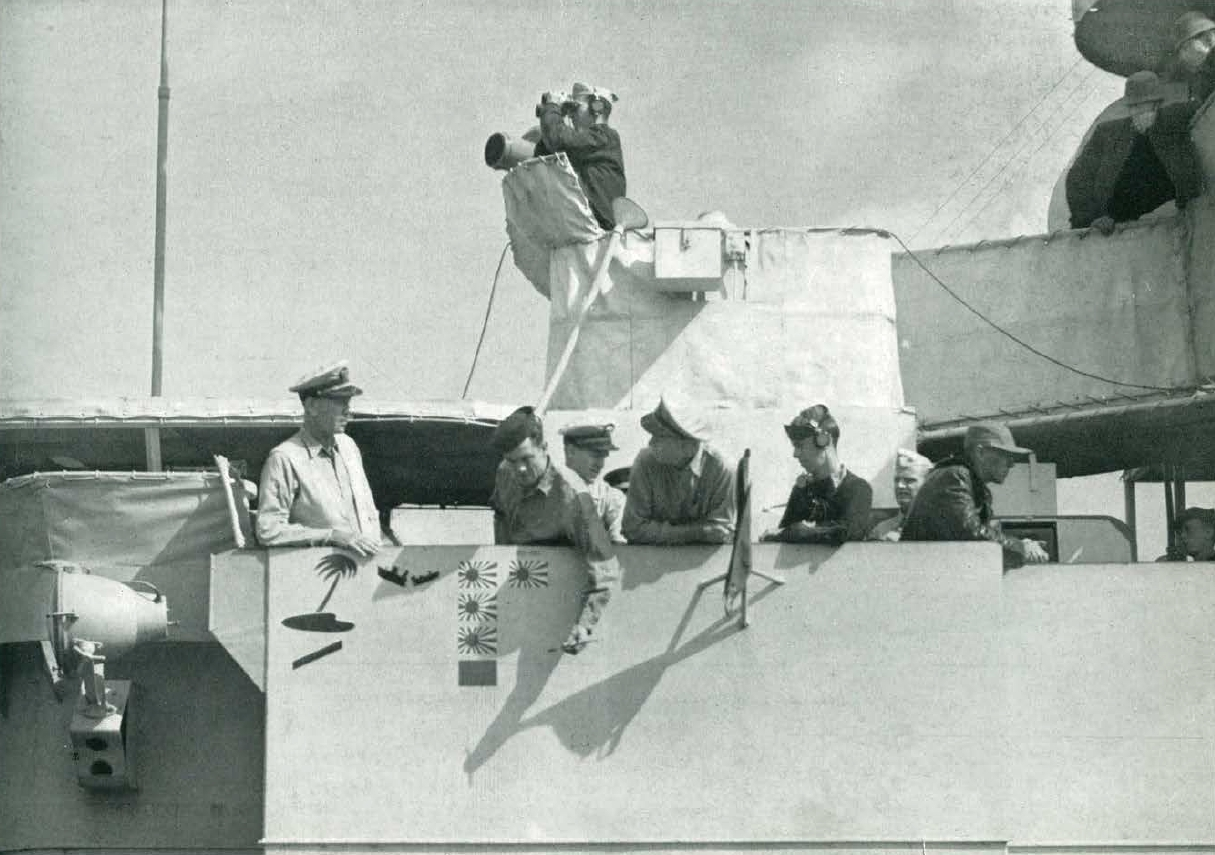
The scoreboard of Lunga Point, on 22 February 1945.

From 23 January 1945 to 10 February, Lunga Point prepared for the invasion of Iwo Jima, and stood off the beaches with the amphibious forces, acting as target coordinators and striking enemy positions during the landings on 19 February.

On 16 February 1945, Vice-Admiral Kimpei Teroaka authorized the formation of a kamikaze special attack unit to counter the imminent landings on Iwo Jima. The kamikaze force consisted of twelve fighters, twelve carrier bombers, and eight torpedo bombers, divided into five groups, thirty-two aircraft in total. On the early morning of 21 February, they departed from Katori Naval Air Base, in Asahi, Chiba. They refueled at Hachijō-jima, and then proceeded towards the U.S. naval contingent surrounding Iwo Jima, arriving near sunset.

On the evening of 21 February, Lunga Point was performing routine close air support with the rest of Task Group 77.4. At the time, the escort carrier task group consisted of Lunga Point, her sister ships Bismarck Sea, Makin Island, Saginaw Bay, Rudyerd Bay, and Anzio, along with a destroyer contingent. The task group was steaming approximately twenty-one miles (34 km) east of Iwo Jima. At 18:45, the task group spotted the Japanese planes headed for them, when a Mitsubishi G4M made a dive towards Lunga Point. Gunners from Bismarck Sea shot it down. At 18:46, five Nakajima B6Ns dove towards Lunga Point. The first plane, approaching from the starboard missed with its torpedo, passing harmlessly in front of Lunga Point. It subsequently crashed into the ocean at a high velocity. The second plane also missed with its torpedo, but managed to disengage and fly away. The third plane also missed with its torpedo, which proceeded behind the stern, and, set aflame and damaged heavily, attempted to crash into the carrier, approaching from the starboard side. The kamikaze exploded before it could hit the ship, and the wreckage of the plane skidded across the deck, and off the side of the carrier, sparking a brief gasoline fire. The fourth plane detonated in mid-air, due to a direct hit from a 5-inch (127 mm) anti-aircraft shell. The fifth plane switched targets to Bismarck Sea, sinking her with the loss of 318 lives. Damage to Lunga Point was minimal, and eleven of her crew was wounded. There were no fatalities. She was able to continue operating in support of troops on Iwo Jima.

The special attack unit, in addition to sinking Bismarck Sea, also heavily damaged Saratoga, Keokuk, and slightly damaged Lunga Point, LST-477, and LST-809. Bismarck Sea was the only ship to sink as a result of the attacks. The kamikaze attacks killed 43 Japanese in total.

She supported operations on Iwo Jima until 8 March, when land-based planes were present in sufficient strength to allow the ship to return to Ulithi to get ready for the Okinawa campaign. When Lunga Point returned to Ulithi, she only had six bombs left in her magazine, having dropped 596 in support of operations on Iwo Jima.

==== Okinawa ====
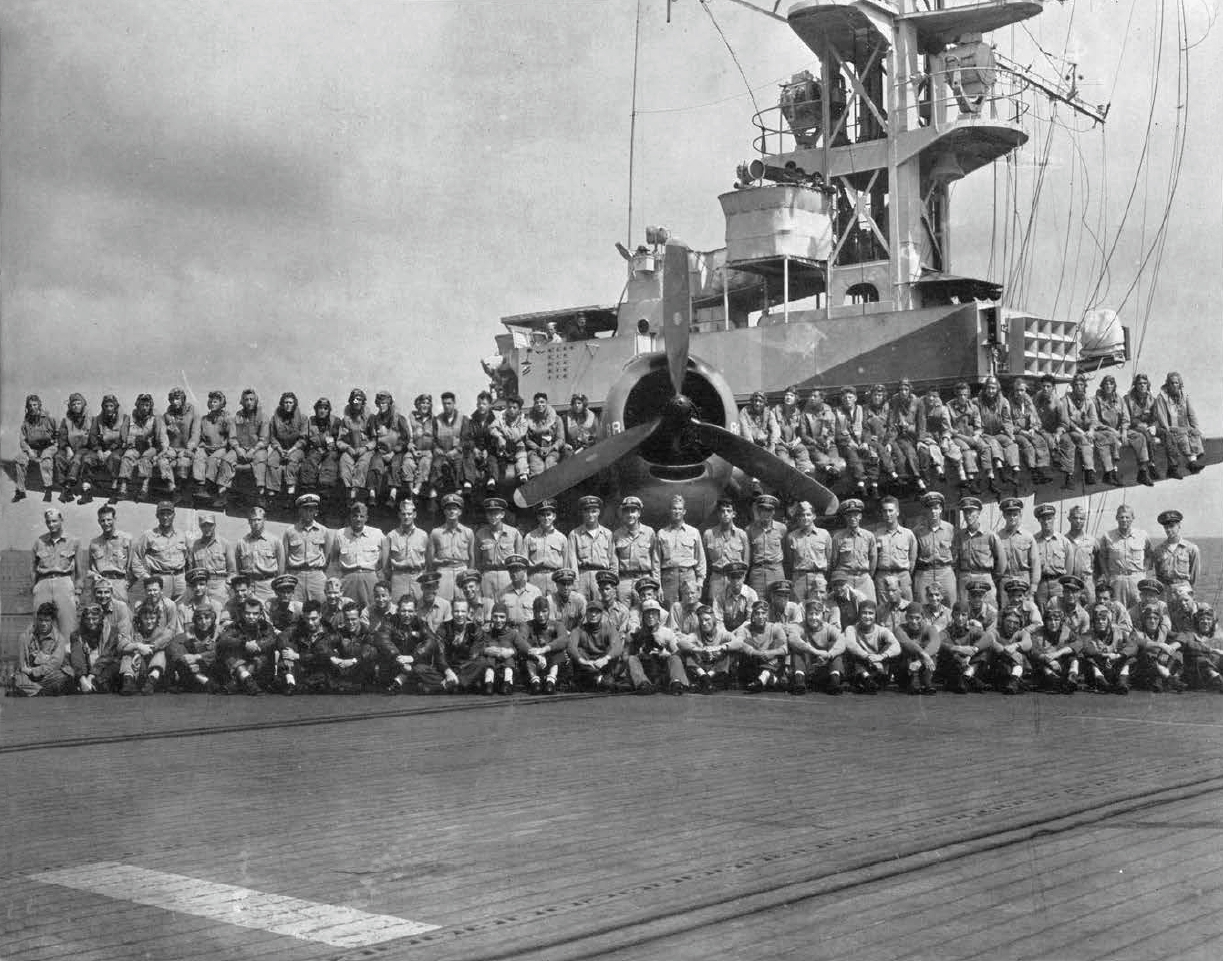
The crewmembers of the U.S. Navy Composite Squadron 85 (VC-85) pose for a photo with one of the squadron's Grumman TBF Avengers aboard Lunga Point. VC-85 was based on Lunga Point from 16 August 1944 to 11 May 1945.

The ship re-provisioned, and on 21 March sortied from Ulithi with Rear Admiral Clifton Sprague's Task Unit. Three days later, on 24 March, she, along with her task group, arrived south of Kerama Retto, providing air cover and bombing targets throughout Okinawa. On 2 April, several kamikazes attempted to strike Lunga Point, all of them being shot down before they came close. However, several transports were damaged and the destroyer Dickerson was heavily damaged in the attack, subsequently being scuttled on 4 April. On 3 April, whilst making a turn, Lunga Point rolled 23 degrees, flinging an FM-2 Wildcat and a lookout off the deck. The lookout was quickly recovered. Lunga Point remained in support of the operation providing air cover, pounding enemy ground targets in the Ryukyu Islands and fighting off constant kamikaze attacks. She completed this duty without mishap, and returned to Leyte on 27 June.

This was followed by a minesweeping operation west of Okinawa in early July, and on 1 August, she departed on an anti-shipping sweep along the Chinese coast from Shanghai northward. On 5 August, Wildcats from Lunga Point downed a Yokosuka P1Y, the last recorded kill by a Wildcat, which had, in the service of escort carriers, shot down a recorded total of 422 Japanese aircraft. On 6 August, an air contingent was sent to attack Japanese installations near Tinghai Harbor, southeast of Shanghai, including an airfield. On 7 August, further strikes were deemed unproductive, and she sailed to Buckner Bay, Okinawa, where she received news of the Japanese peace offerings on 15 August.

=== Postwar ===
In late August the ship, attached to the 5th Fleet, aided in repatriating Allied prisoners of war (POWs) from the ports of Wakayama and Nagasaki. On 15 September, she arrived, steered through Japanese minefields, in the port of Wakayama. On 19 September she transported 760 men of various nationalities to Okinawa. The captain was obliged to assign two men to a bunk to accommodate the ex-POWs. She then unloaded her cargo in Manila harbor. She was ordered to Tokyo Bay in early October, and en route took part in the unsuccessful search for Rear Admiral W. D. Sample missing in a PBM Mariner on a patrol flight. Lunga Point stood out of Tokyo Bay 28 October, and arrived at Pearl Harbor on 7 November. She sailed to San Diego arriving on 15 November, and made voyages to the Pacific before returning to the west coast early in 1946.

On 24 October 1946, the ship was decommissioned and became part of the Pacific Reserve Fleet, Tacoma, Pacific Reserve Fleet. She was reclassified CVU-94 on 12 June 1955 and AKV-32 on 7 May 1959. She was struck from the Navy list on 1 April 1960, and sold at San Diego to Hyman Michaels Co. on 25 July 1960. Later in the year, she was broken up in Japan.

== Sources ==
=== Online sources ===
- "Lunga Point (CVE-94)". Dictionary of American Naval Fighting Ships. Naval History and Heritage Command. 27 April 2016. Archived from the original on 23 June 2019. This article incorporates text from this source, which is in the public domain.
- "Kaiser Vancouver, Vancouver WA". www.ShipbuildingHistory.com. 27 November 2010. Archived from the original on 16 June 2019.
- "Katori Air Base Monument, Asahi City, Chiba Prefecture". www.kamikazeimages.net. Archived from the original on 23 June 2019.
- "World Aircraft Carriers List: US Escort Carriers, S4 Hulls". Hazegray.org. 14 December 1998. Archived from the original on 19 November 2021.

=== Bibliography ===
- Adcock, Al (1996), Escort Carriers in Action - Warships No. 9, Carrollton, Texas: Squadron/Signal Publications, ISBN 9780897473569
- Chesneau, Robert; Gardiner, Robert (1980), Conway's All the World's Fighting Ships 1922–1946, London, England: Naval Institute Press, ISBN 9780870219139
- Friedman, Norman (1983), U.S. Aircraft Carriers: An Illustrated Design History, Annapolis, Maryland: Naval Institute Press, ISBN 9780870217395
- Rielly, Robin (2010), Kamikaze Attacks of World War II: A Complete History of Japanese Suicide Strikes on American Ships, by Aircraft and Other Means, Jefferson, North Carolina: McFarland & Company, ISBN 9780786457724
- Ross, Al (1993), The Escort Carrier Gambier Bay, Anatomy of the Ship, London, England: Conway Maritime Press, ISBN 9781557502353
- Silverstone, Paul (2011), The Navy of the Nuclear Age, 1947–2007, New York City, New York: Routledge, ISBN 9781135864668
- Taylor, Ellie (2018), A Cruel Captivity: Prisoners of the Japanese – Their Ordeal and The Legacy, Barnsley, England: Pen and Sword Books, ISBN 9781526732620
- Wukovits, John (2015), Hell from the Heavens: The Epic Story of the USS Laffey and World War II's Greatest Kamikaze Attack, Boston, Massachusetts: Da Capo Press, ISBN 9780306823244
- Y'Blood, William (2012), The Little Giants: U.S. Escort Carriers Against Japan, Annapolis, Maryland: Naval Institute Press, ISBN 9781612512471
