= USS Williams (DE-372) =

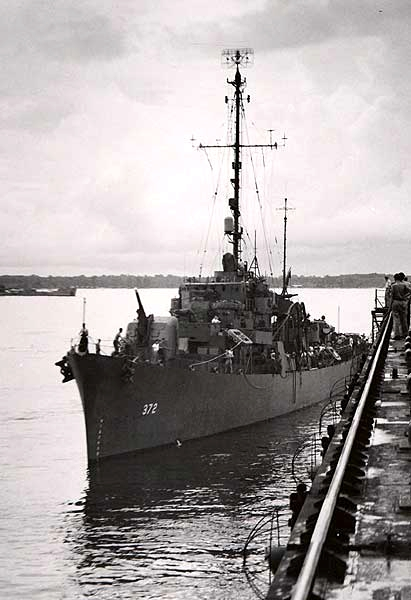
- USS Williams (DE-372) in port, c. 1945

History

United States
- Name: Williams
- Namesake: George Washington Williams
- Builder: Consolidated Steel Corporation
- Laid down: 5 June 1944
- Launched: 22 August 1944
- Sponsored by: Mrs. E. Willoughby Middleton
- Commissioned: 11 November 1944
- Decommissioned: 4 June 1946
- Stricken: 1 July 1967
- Fate: Sunk as target off California 29 June 1968

General characteristics
- Class & type: John C. Butler-class destroyer escort
- Displacement: 1,350 long tons (1,372 t)
- Length: 306 ft (93 m)
- Beam: 36 ft 8 in (11.18 m)
- Draft: 9 ft 5 in (2.87 m)
- Propulsion: 2 boilers, 2 geared turbine engines, 12,000 shp (8,900 kW); 2 propellers
- Speed: 24 knots (44 km/h)
- Range: 6,000 nmi (11,000 km) at 12 kn (22 km/h; 14 mph)
- Complement: 14 officers, 201 enlisted
- Armament: 2 × single 5 in (127 mm) guns; 2 × twin 40 mm (1.6 in) AA guns; 10 × single 20 mm (0.79 in) AA guns; 1 × triple 21 in (533 mm) torpedo tubes; 8 × depth charge throwers; 1 × Hedgehog ASW mortar; 2 × depth charge racks

USS Williams (DE-372) was a John C. Butler-class destroyer escort in service with the United States Navy from 1944 to 1946. She was finally sunk as a target in 1968.

== History ==
Williams was named in honor of Rear Admiral George Washington Williams, who was awarded the Navy Cross for his World War I efforts. The ship's keel was laid down on 5 June 1944 at Orange, Texas by the Consolidated Steel Corp. The destroyer escort was launched on 22 August 1944, sponsored by Mrs. E. Willoughby Middleton, the first cousin of Rear Admiral Williams. Williams was commissioned on 11 November 1944.

Following shakedown out of Great Sound, Bermuda, Williams underwent post-shakedown availability at Boston, Massachusetts, before shifting to New London, Connecticut, on 11 January 1945. Departing on the 19th, she moved to Newport, Rhode Island, to rendezvous with USS Riverside, and got underway on the 30th for Panama. Williams escorted the attack transport to Balboa, in the Panama Canal Zone, and subsequently sailed for the U.S. West Coast in company with USS Sims, arriving at San Diego, California, on 7 February.

Williams soon steamed independently to Hawaii, arriving at Pearl Harbor on 16 February. Following a period of training and minor repairs, the destroyer escort pushed on for the New Hebrides before escorting a group of LCI's from Espiritu Santo to Lunga Point from 25 to 27 March. Returning via Tulagi to Espiritu Santo on the 30th, Williams shifted to Nouméa soon thereafter, to rendezvous with USS Vulcan and escort the repair ship to Ulithi where they arrived on 15 April.

After shifting to Manus Island, in the Admiralties, upon the conclusion of this escort mission, Williams convoyed USS Long Island to Guam which she reached on 25 April, before escorting USS Copahee to Eniwetok, and eventually returning to Manus on 6 May.

Four days later, the busy escort vessel departed the Admiralties with USS Presley, Ross, and Howorth, bound for the Philippines escorting Transport Division 11. While en route on the afternoon of 15 May, ships in the group sighted a derelict mine and sank it with gunfire. The escorts delivered their charges at Leyte on 16 May, and Williams subsequently sailed for Hollandia and Manus, arriving at the latter on 30 May.

Her respite in the Admiralties ended on 4 June when she got underway again and joined sister ship Presley in escorting a task unit bound for Tinian with ground forces of the Army Air Force XX Bomber Command embarked. Completing this mission on the 7th, Williams operated between Manus and the Marshalls into the latter part of June when she escorted USS Lander to Eniwetok.

=== End-of-war activity ===
Williams operated out of Manus through the end of the war with Japan in mid-August 1945. During this time, she carried out drills, training exercises, and harbor entrance patrols before spending the first weeks of September in operations with the Ulithi unit of the Western Carolines Patrol and Escort Group.

After a brief visit to Yap and a stint towing a derelict ammunition barge, Williams was transferred to the Marianas patrol on 20 September. She escorted USS Bougainville to Okinawa between 24 and 27 September before getting underway on the latter date to return to Guam.

=== Caught in a deadly typhoon ===
On the return passage, on the night of 29 September, Williams found herself trapped in the path of a severe tropical hurricane. A huge breaking wave pounded into the starboard side of the ship and nearly rolled Williams over. One man was swept overboard and out of sight in the stormy sea. Severe structural damage occurred topside, and minor flooding occurred below decks. Before she reached Guam, she spotted a floating mine and destroyed it with gunfire.

== Post-war decommissioning ==
Williams underwent permanent repairs at Guam before she sailed via Pearl Harbor for the west coast of the United States. Decommissioned at San Diego, California, on 4 June 1946, Williams was inactivated and placed in reserve on 7 October of the same year. She never saw further service and was struck from the Navy list on 1 July 1967. Stripped to a hulk, the former destroyer escort was towed to sea from San Diego and sunk as a target by shellfire and missiles launched from both ships and planes on 29 June 1968.
