= Alazan Bay =

Coordinates: 27.31°N 97.54°W

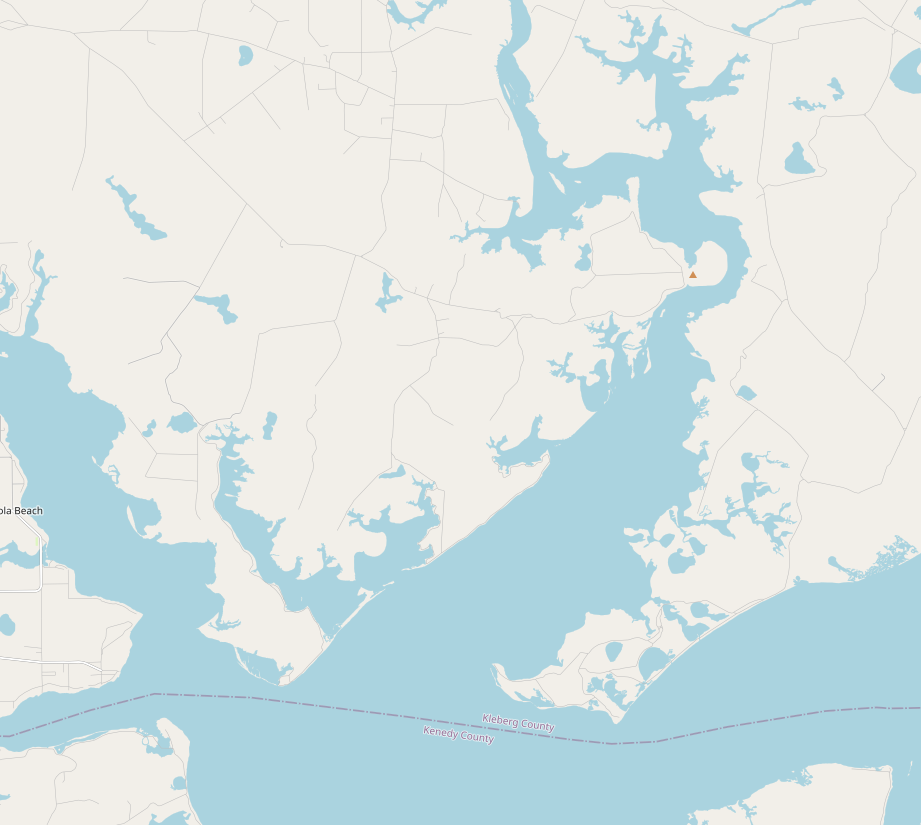
Aerial view of Alazan Bay with Baffin Bay located underneath. Padre Island is located to the right of Alazan Bay.

Alazan Bay is located in southeast Texas, United States in Kleberg County near the city of Kingsville. The mouth of Alazan Bay feeds into Baffin Bay and among the three bays that extend off Baffin Bay, Alazan Bay is the largest. The entirety of Alazan Bay is surrounded by King Ranch. Alazan Bay and its neighboring bays act as a natural barrier between the arid southern region of Texas and its much healthier region to the north. Alazan Bay is located at 27°20' north latitude and 97°31' west longitude. The other two bays extending from Baffin Bay are called Laguna Salada Bay and Cayo de Grullo Bay. Alazan Bay is fed by Petronila Creek which is located north of Alazan and east of Cayo de Grullo. The northern shore of Alazan Bay can be seen as lined by light colored clay dunes and mud flats which stretch up into Petronila Creek as well. Alazan Bay is known for its redfish and speckled trout fishing by locals. The northern tip of the bay breaks off into tidal lakes which hold the majority of these fish.

Alazan Bay's name may be derived from El Alazán, the Spanish grant of Vicente de Ynojosa. This land grant is located on Alazan Bay's northwest border. The Spanish word alazan possibly refers to the sorrel color of horses, livestock, as well as the soil often seen surrounding Alazan Bay. Alternative names that refer to Alazan Bay are Agua Dulce, Callo De Laureles and Alazan Bay.

Padre Island National Seashore acts as a natural barrier between Alazan Bay and the Gulf of Mexico. Around 3,000 years ago, Padre Island formed and caused the water in Baffin, Alazan, and all neighboring bays to become hypersaline. This increase in salinity has in turn hurt many species while allowing certain fish species to thrive. The plains which drain into this system of bays can be characterized by their high temperatures and dry conditions as a result of scarce rainfall. In addition to these conditions, Alazan Bay's waters remain saline due to the lack of freshwater flowing in and the exceedingly high levels of evaporation. Due to these extraordinary conditions, salinity levels in the bay can reach over 100 parts per thousand which is not found anywhere else in Texas.
