= USS Lynde McCormick =

Charles F. Adams-class destroyer

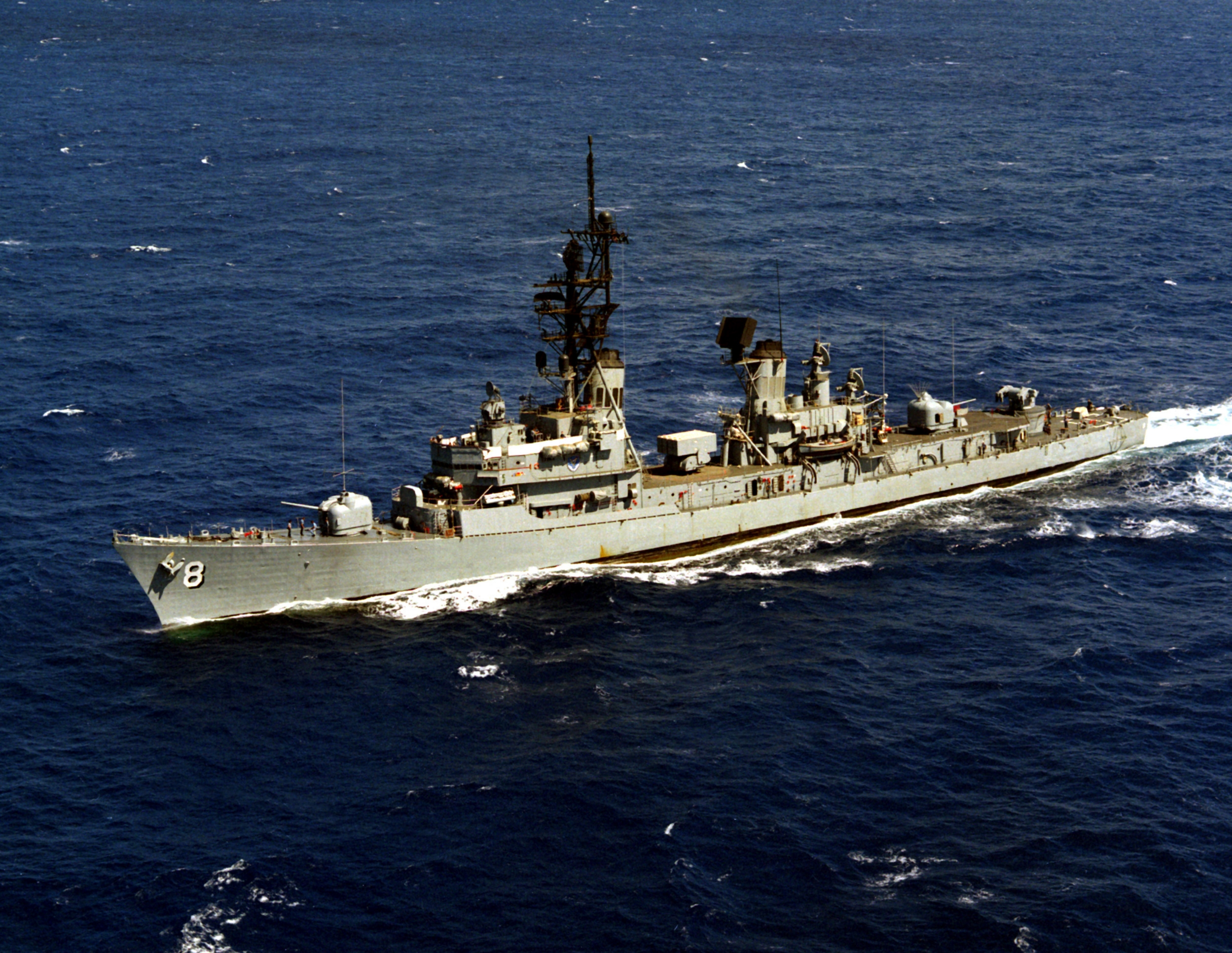
- USS Lynde McCormick underway in 1974

History

United States
- Name: Lynde McCormick
- Namesake: Lynde D. McCormick
- Ordered: 28 March 1957
- Builder: Defoe Shipbuilding Company
- Laid down: 4 April 1958
- Launched: 28 July 1959
- Acquired: 29 May 1961
- Commissioned: 3 June 1961
- Decommissioned: 1 October 1991
- Reclassified: DDG-8, 23 April 1957
- Stricken: 20 November 1992
- Identification: Callsign: NHXD; Hull number: DD-958
- Motto: Sine Timore; (Without Fear)
- Fate: Sunk as target, 14 February 2001
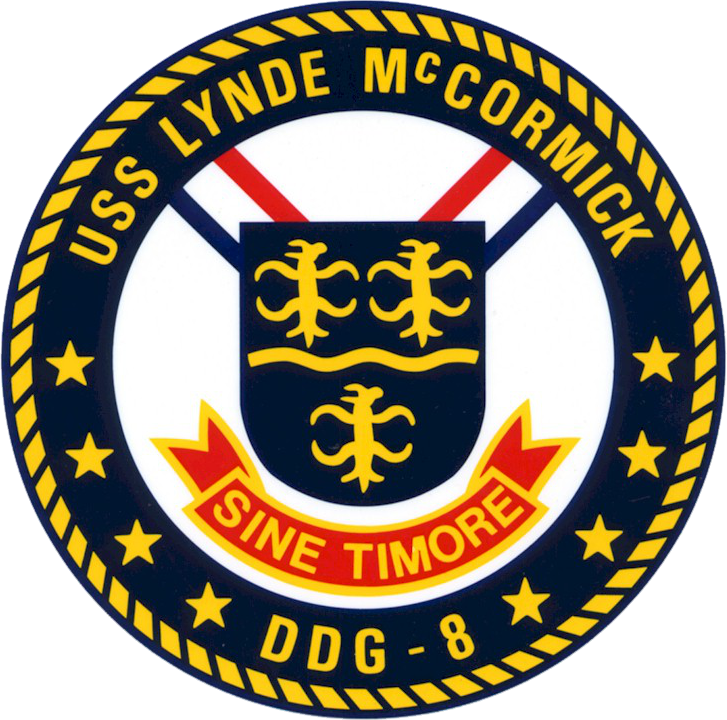
- Badge

General characteristics
- Class & type: Charles F. Adams-class destroyer
- Displacement: 3,277 tons standard, 4,526 full load
- Length: 437 ft (133 m)
- Beam: 47 ft (14 m)
- Draft: 15 ft (4.6 m)
- Propulsion: 2 × General Electric steam turbines providing 70,000 shp (52 MW); 2 shafts; 4 × Babcock & Wilcox 1,275 psi (8,790 kPa) boilers
- Speed: 33 knots (61 km/h; 38 mph)
- Range: 4,500 nautical miles (8,300 km) at 20 knots (37 km/h)
- Complement: 354 (24 officers, 330 enlisted)
- Sensors & processing systems: AN/SPS-39 3D air search radar; AN/SPS-10 surface search radar; AN/SPG-51 missile fire control radar; AN/SPG-53 gunfire control radar; AN/SQS-23 Sonar and the hull mounted SQQ-23 Pair Sonar for DDG-2 through 19; AN/SPS-40 Air Search Radar
- Armament: 1 Mk 11 missile launcher holding 40 RIM-24 Tartar Surface-to-air missiles , or later the RIM-66 Standard missile (SM-1) and Harpoon antiship missile; 2 × 5"/54 caliber Mark 42 (127 mm) gun; 1 × RUR-5 ASROC Launcher holding 8 rounds; 6 × 12.8 in (324 mm) ASW Torpedo Tubes (2 x Mark 32 Surface Vessel Torpedo Tubes)

USS Lynde McCormick (DD-958/DDG-8) was a Charles F. Adams-class destroyer in the United States Navy.

== Construction and career ==
Lynde McCormick (DDG-8) was laid down 4 April 1958 by Defoe Shipbuilding Company, Bay City, Michigan; launched 28 July 1959; sponsored by Mrs. Lillian McCormick, wife of Admiral McCormick; and commissioned at Boston 3 June 1961.

Lynde McCormick departed Boston 23 August 1961 for her home port, San Diego, arriving 16 September. Early in 1962, she tested her missiles and antisubmarine weaponry in the Pacific missile range. Exercises and experiments continued in preparation for deployment to the western Pacific, for which she sailed 19 November 1962.

She arrived at Yokosuka on 6 December and within a week was on station with a 7th Fleet task group, taking up her part in the schedule of readiness training and exercises. Returning to San Diego 15 June 1963, she proceeded to Sacramento to help initiate its new deepwater port. All‑encompassing refresher training followed overhaul and modification at Hunters Point early in 1964, increasing her antiair warfare capabilities.

=== Vietnam War ===
A high state of readiness had been achieved when the Gulf of Tonkin incidents of 2 and 4 August escalated the Vietnam War.

In company with CruDesFlot 11, Lynde McCormick departed 5 August for a 6-month deployment along the Vietnamese coast, primarily in the screen for Bon Homme Richard and other aircraft carriers. She returned to San Diego 6 February 1965. Lynde McCormick spent the remainder of the year conducting coastal exercises, a successful competitive firing of her, missiles, and a summer cruise to Hawaii training midshipmen.

After anti-submarine exercises with the Royal Canadian Navy in January 1966, Lynde McCormick prepared for a third tour of duty in WestPac.

She left San Diego on 1 March and 1-month later was shelling Vietcong bunkers and gun emplacements in the Mekong Delta. In May, she sailed up the eastern coast to support Yankee Station carrier operations against North Vietnam until August, when she sailed for her home port, arriving at San Diego 26 October. On 27 October, she entered drydock at Long Beach for a thorough overhaul. This was completed 23 March 1967.

Refresher training began on 15 May, and was interrupted on 27 May when she rushed to the aid of a stricken crewmember of the ship 88 Pacific Comet. Lynde McCormick continued operating out of San Diego until 17 August, at which time she departed for another WestPac deployment.

In October 1967 while shelling suspected North Vietnamese gun emplacements just north of the DMZ in company with the USS Newport News, Lynde McCormick was taken under fire by North Vietnamese artillery. She and the Newport News departed the area while shells splashed around them. Film footage of the Lynde McCormick was taken showing this event and was featured on Walter Cronkite's Evening News. In January 1968, Lynde McCormick was ordered to the coast off of Hue to provide gunfire support during the Tet offensive. She remained on station firing in support of American forces there for about two weeks until her barrels were completely spent.

In March 1968 she was ordered to the Sea of Japan as part of the USS Kearsarge battle group while a plan was considered about trying to retrieve the USS Pueblo (AGER-2), that was taken by the North Korean forces in international waters. April found the Lynde McCormick headed back to San Diego completing her 67/68 deployment.

In June 1982, Lynde McCormick fired .50 caliber rounds over Vietnamese boats after the boats had fired on USS Turner Joy (DD-951) during an incident reminiscent of the Gulf of Tonkin incident.

=== 1983 deployment ===
On 20 July 1983 The New York Times reported that Lynde McCormick, along with seven other vessels in the USS Ranger Battle Group, left San Diego on Friday, 15 July 1983 and were headed for the western Pacific when they were rerouted and ordered to steam for Central America to conduct training and flight operations in areas off the coasts of Nicaragua, El Salvador and Honduras as part of major military exercises planned for that summer.

The battle group was composed of the carrier Ranger, battleship New Jersey (which joined the group in late August), cruiser Horne, the guided missile destroyer Lynde McCormick, the destroyers Fletcher and Fife, the frigate Marvin Shields, the oiler Wichita and the support ship Camden.

=== Operation Praying Mantis ===
In April 1988, the USS Lynde McCormick (DDG-8) was part of the largest combat action against another navy since World War II. It was one of many ships of the U.S. fifth fleet under SAG Bravo engaged in operations against the Iranian Navy. This included anti–ship and mine operations, stopping small – boat attacks against Persian Gulf shipping & countering tactical operations by Iranian warships near the Strait of Hormuz. These operation was a resounding success and concluded in the freedom of navigation of commercial shipping in and out of the Persian Gulf.

=== Decommissioning ===
The ship was decommissioned 1 October 1991 and was sunk as a target ship on 14 February 2001.
