= Frederick J. Horne =

United States navy four-star admiral (1880–1959)

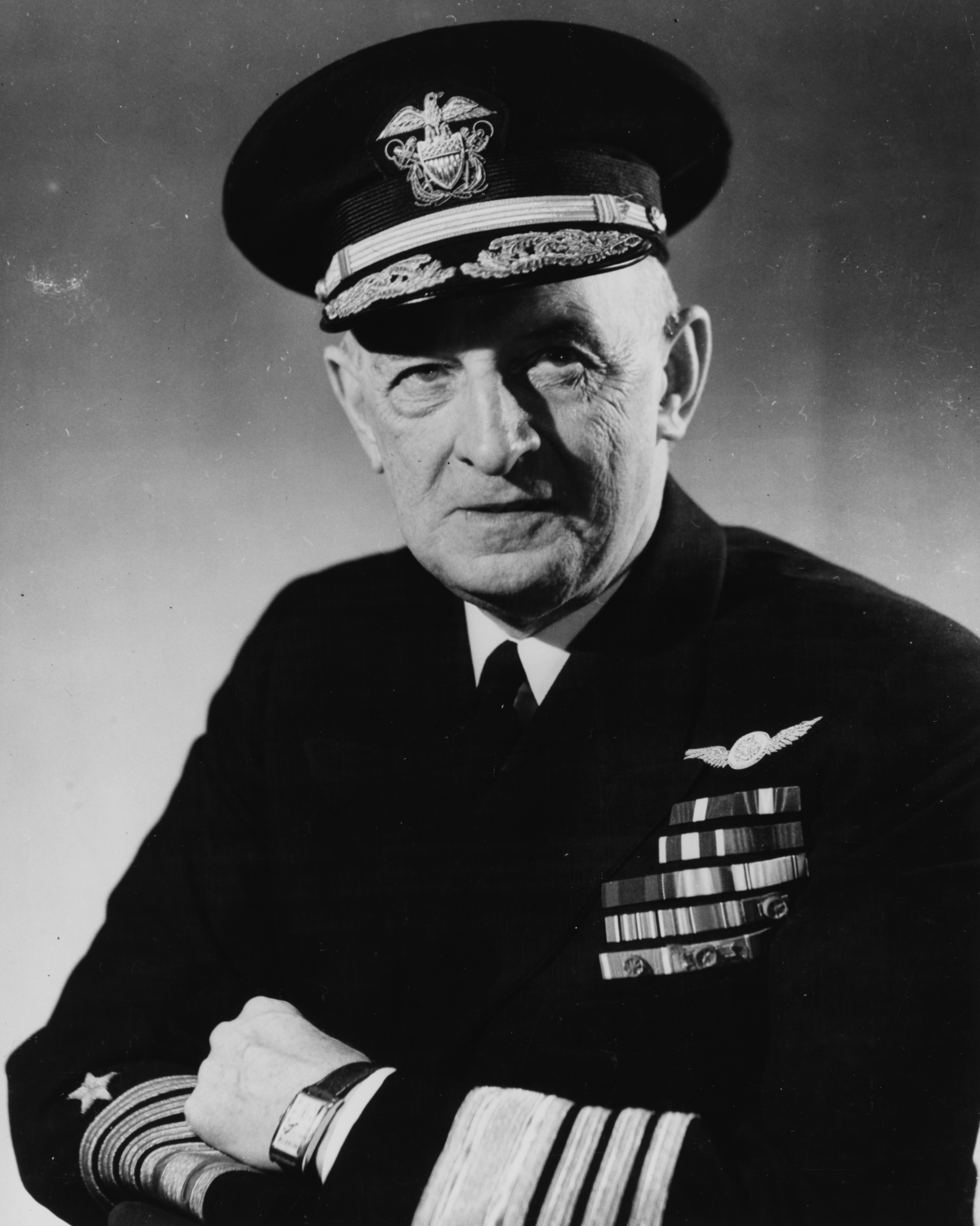
- Frederick J. Horne
- Born: February 14, 1880; New York City, New York, US
- Died: October 18, 1959 (aged 79); San Diego, California, US
- Military career
- Branch: United States Navy
- Service years: 1899–1946
- Rank: Admiral
- Conflicts: Spanish–American War; World War I World War II
- Awards: Distinguished Service Medal; Navy Cross

Admiral Frederick Joseph Horne (February 14, 1880 – October 18, 1959) was a four-star admiral in the United States Navy. As the first Vice Chief of Naval Operations, he directed all Navy logistics during World War II.

== Early career ==
Horne was born in New York City, New York, on February 14, 1880, to George Edward Horne and the former Marguerite Agnes Cooper. He was appointed from the state of New York to the United States Naval Academy at Annapolis, Maryland, on May 20, 1895.

As a naval cadet, (Note: U.S. Naval Academy undergraduates were titled "naval cadets" between 1882 and 1902, and "midshipmen" thereafter.) he served in the Spanish–American War aboard the gunboat USS Bancroft and the battleship USS Texas during the summer of 1898; he participated in the Battle of Santiago de Cuba on July 3, 1898. He graduated from the academy on January 28, 1899. He fulfilled the two years' sea duty required before he could be commissioned as an officer as a passed midshipman aboard the protected cruiser USS New Orleans (CL-22), the gunboat USS Paragua, the gunboat USS Castine (PG-6), the gunboat USS Yorktown (PG-1), the distilling ship USS Iris, and the hospital ship USS Solace (AH-2). During those assignments, he participated in 15 engagements of the Philippine–American War. He was commissioned ensign with date of rank January 28, 1901.

After receiving his commission, he continued to serve at sea aboard the gunboat USS Alert (AS-4), the wooden screw sloop USS Adams, and as chief engineer of the gunboat USS Wheeling (PG-14). In 1904, he returned to the Naval Academy as an instructor in the Department of Engineering. From May 25, 1906, he was senior engineer of the monitor USS Florida (BM-9). In September 1906, he was transferred to the battleship USS Illinois (BB-7), where he performed similar duties until November 28, 1908. He then served two years as executive officer of the protected cruiser USS Chattanooga (CL-18), operating with the Asiatic Fleet, until October 8, 1910. He reported again to the Naval Academy as an instructor in the Department of Navigation between November 1, 1910, and June 10, 1912, a tour that included service as senior engineer officer of the battleship USS Iowa (BB-4) for the practice cruise of Summer 1911.

He then served as navigator of the battleships USS New Hampshire (BB-25) and USS Alabama (BB-8). He reported to the Naval Training Station for duty in charge of a draft of men to Manila; then served as navigator of the armored cruiser USS Saratoga (ACR-2), operating with the Asiatic Fleet. Upon reaching Naval Station, Olongapo, Philippine Islands, he spent three months as captain of the yard. From June to November 1914, he commanded the distilling ship USS Rainbow (AS-7), which departed Manila Bay in July and surveyed the French Frigate Shoals, Hawaii, while en route to the Mare Island Naval Shipyard for decommissioning.

=== World War I ===
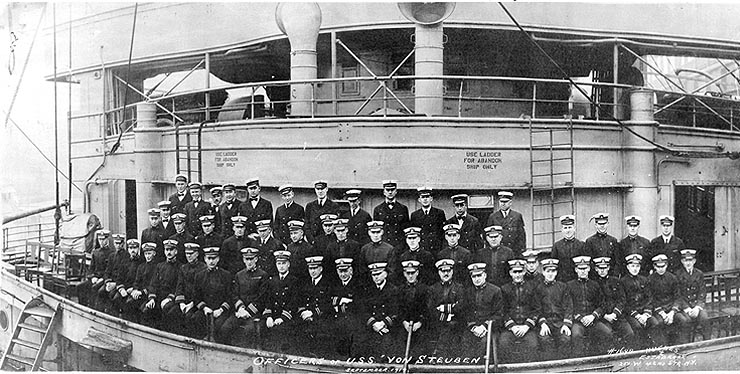
Horne as commanding officer of USS Von Steuben, September 1919 (front row, eighth from left).

As a lieutenant commander, Horne was assigned duty with the naval attaché in Tokyo, Japan, before serving as naval attaché himself from January 15, 1915, to March 15, 1919. He was awarded the Navy Cross for "distinguished service ... as Naval Attaché ... in which capacity he had remarkable success in establishing and maintaining friendly relations with the Japanese authorities in supplying valuable information to the Office of Naval Intelligence and to the Commander in Chief of the Asiatic Fleet ... [and] with the purchase and building of ships in Japan for the United States Government." He also became the first American naval officer to be decorated by the Japanese government, which awarded him the Order of the Sacred Treasure, Third Class, for "his splendid service as Naval Attaché." Upon returning to the United States, Horne reported to the Office of Naval Intelligence in Washington, D.C., for a month of special duty.

He assumed command of the troop transport USS Von Steuben (ID-3017) on May 17, 1919; the ship ferried troops home from France before being decommissioned in October of that year, whereupon Horne transferred to the destroyer tender USS Buffalo, operating with the Pacific Fleet. He remained with Buffalo until June 1920, except for a month commanding the cruiser USS Birmingham (CL-2)—flagship of Destroyer Squadrons, Pacific Fleet—then commanded the fleet repair ship USS Vestal (AR-4) for a year.

Returning ashore in June 1921, he reported as aide to the commandant of the Portsmouth Navy Yard in New Hampshire, then attended the Naval War College in Newport, Rhode Island, and the Army War College in Washington, D.C.

He commanded the light cruiser USS Omaha (CL-4) from June 14, 1924, to January 16, 1926, after which he had duty in connection with the Naval Reserve in the Third Naval District, New York City, until March 1926.

=== Naval aviation observer ===
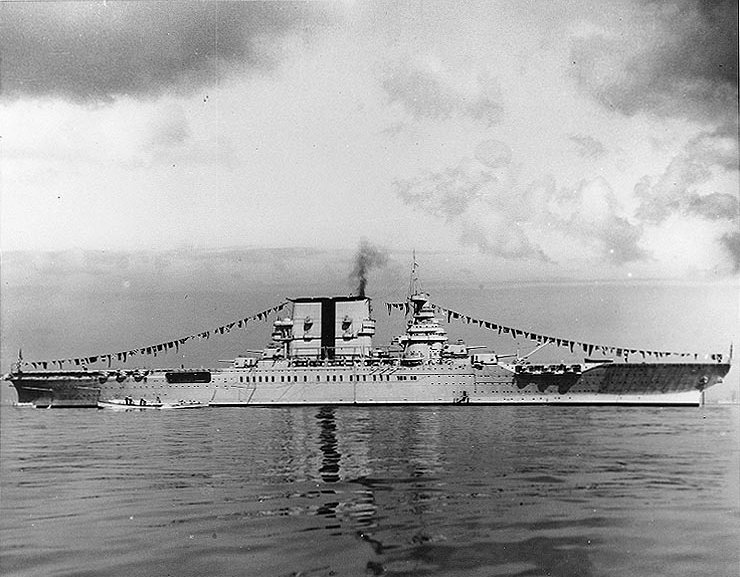
USS Saratoga (CV-3)

From March to June 1926, Horne was a member of the first class of captains persuaded by Bureau of Aeronautics chief William A. Moffett to undergo flight training at Naval Air Station Pensacola, Florida. A new law restricted the command of aircraft carriers, tenders, squadrons, and aviation shore establishments to qualified naval aviators or naval aviation observers. Qualification as a naval aviator required a demanding 200 hours in the air, so most older officers opted for the less rigorous designation of naval aviation observer, which required only 100 hours in the air. Horne qualified as a naval aviation observer along with most of the other captains in his class, which included future three- and four-star admirals Joseph M. Reeves, Harry E. Yarnell, Alfred Wilkinson Johnson, and Henry V. Butler.

After serving as a member of the Naval Examining Board in the Navy Department, Horne temporarily relieved Captain Ernest J. King as commanding officer of the aircraft tender USS Wright (AV-1) on January 3, 1927. Moffett had assigned King to Wright before he had received the necessary flight training in order to ensure King got command of the tender; Horne served as a caretaker captain while King qualified as a naval aviation observer at Pensacola. King resumed command of Wright on June 6, 1927. As Wright's captain, Horne had additional duty as senior aide on the staff of Commander Aircraft Squadrons, Scouting Fleet.

From June 1927 to April 1929, Horne served as chief assistant to Rear Admiral Frank Schofield, head of the War Plans Division of the Office of the Chief of Naval Operations. Horne's experience with aviation and as naval attaché in Tokyo proved invaluable when updating War Plan Orange, the prewar blueprint for a projected war with Japan. His "down-to-earth, old shoe" personality helped soothe relations with Army counterparts on the Joint Army and Navy Board.

Horne commanded the aircraft carrier USS Saratoga (CV-3) from April 20, 1929, to September 5, 1930, then served as Commander Aircraft Squadrons, Scouting Fleet from September 20, 1930, to June 5, 1931. His title was changed to Commander Carrier Division 1, U.S. Fleet, in October 1930, then changed again on February 13, 1931, to Commander Aircraft, Scouting Force, and Commander Division 1. He reported to the Fourteenth Naval District, Pearl Harbor on July 18, 1931, as chief of staff to the commandant, a position he held for two years.

== Flag officer ==
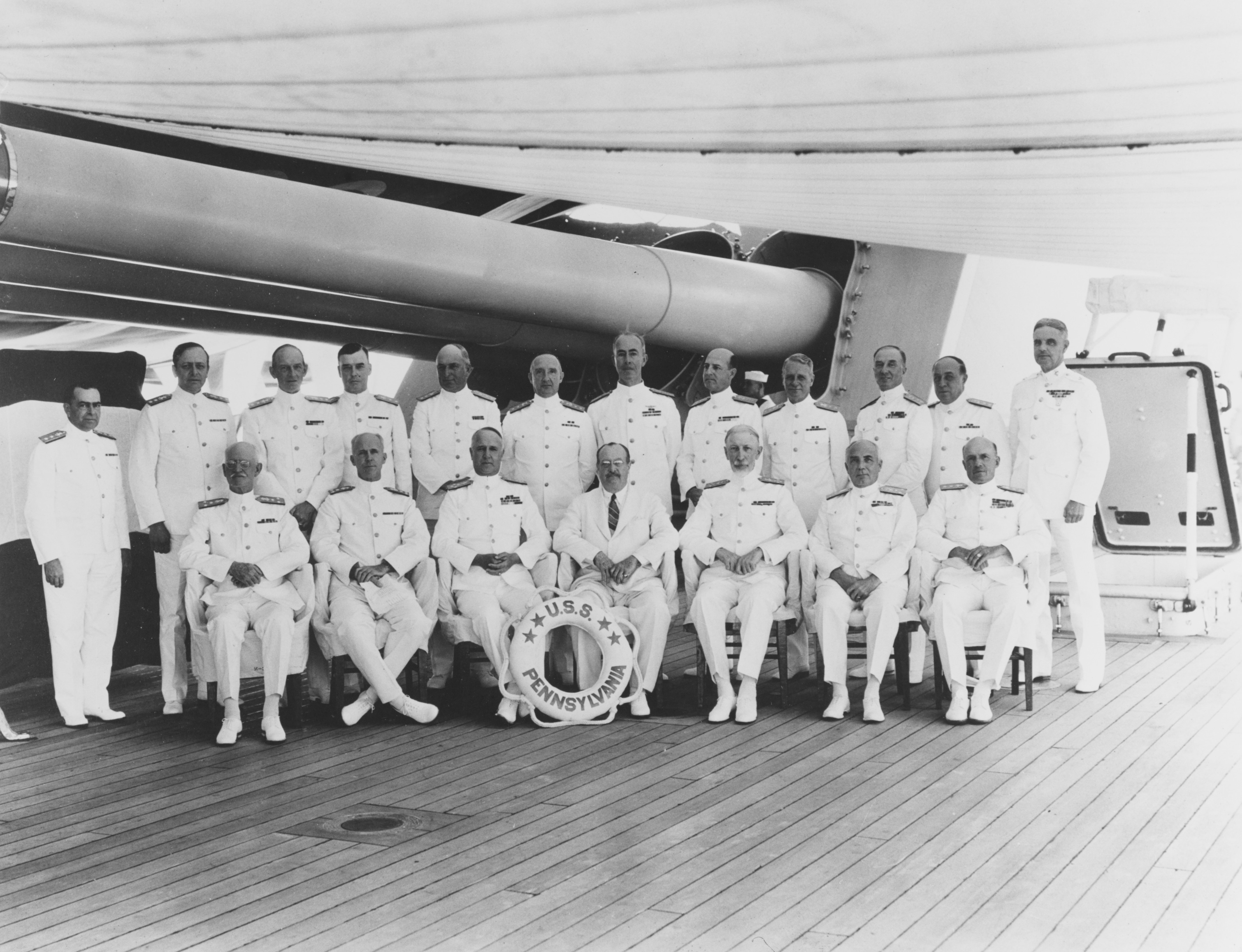
Horne as Commander, Base Force, 1934 (standing, third from left)

As a rear admiral, Horne served as Commander Train Squadron, Base Force, and as Commander, Base Force, from June 1933 to June 1934; as a member of the Naval Examining Board until March 1935; as Commander Cruiser Division 6, Scouting Force from April 1, 1935, to June 18, 1935; and as Commander Aircraft, Base Force, until June 9, 1936, when he was relieved by King, who was now a rear admiral as well.

=== Commander Aircraft, Battle Force ===
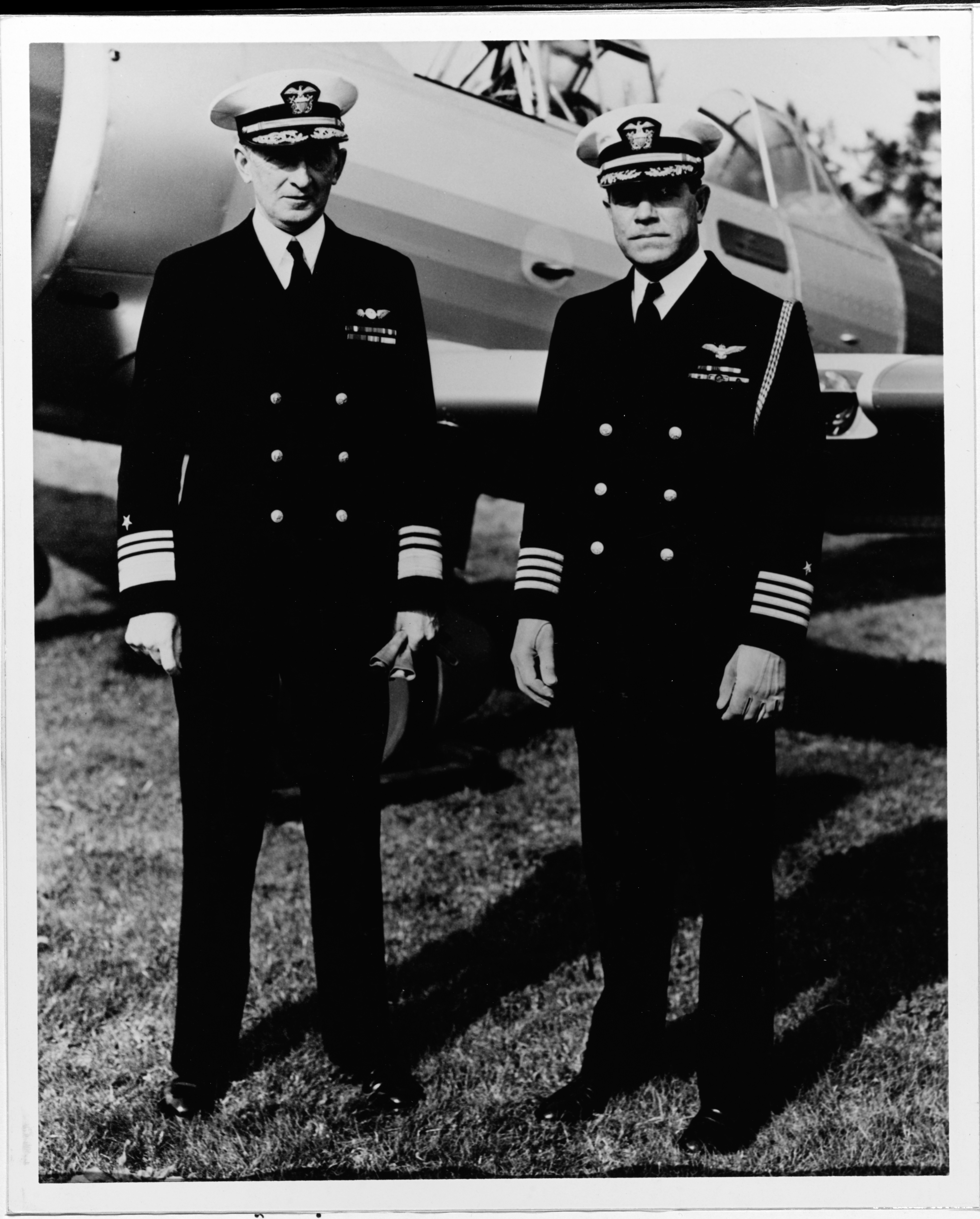
Horne (left) as Commander, Aircraft, Battle Force with his Aide, Captain Patrick N. L. Bellinger in June 1937.

Promoted to the temporary rank of vice admiral, Horne served as Commander Aircraft, Battle Force (COMAIRBATFOR), from June 9, 1936, to January 29, 1938.

Horne's tour as COMAIRBATFOR was marked by Fleet Problem XVIII, one in a series of annual fleet exercises that developed and tested naval doctrine between the wars. In one early simulation, Horne faced off against King in a simulated air assault on San Diego, California. Horne's carriers, USS Saratoga and USS Ranger (CV-4), were tasked with attacking the city, which was defended by King's shore-based patrol planes and the aircraft of the carrier USS Lexington (CV-2). King's patrol planes located Horne's carriers during the night. In the morning, Horne was frustrated by a heavy fog that prevented all carrier aircraft from taking off, while clear skies over San Diego allowed King to launch heavy bombing attacks that "sank" both of Horne's carriers before the exercise ended at 10:00 a.m.

King succeeded Horne as COMAIRBATFOR in January 1938, and Horne reverted to his permanent rank of rear admiral.

=== General Board ===
From March 15, 1938, Horne was a member of the General Board of the Navy, where he became the admiral designated to handle aviation problems. (Note: King joined him on the General Board a year later.)

In 1939, Horne headed an influential board that established personnel policies for the expansion of naval aviation. Convened on June 29, 1939, by the Secretary of the Navy "to study matters concerning the regular and reserve aviation personnel of the Navy and Marine Corps," the Horne Board's other members were Commander George D. Murray, Commander Edwin T. Short, Marine Lieutenant Colonel L. C. Merritt, and Lieutenant Commander Walton W. Smith. The rapid expansion of naval aviation had created a demand for pilots far in excess of the supply of qualified Naval Academy graduates. After six months of study, the Board submitted its report on December 22, 1939. "Naval aviation is an essential part of the fleet. ... Naval Aviators should be required to maintain qualification for general duty in the line", the Horne Board declared, rejecting proposals to create a separate Aviation Corps within the Navy, (Note: Analogous to the Army's Air Corps,) or to designate officers for Aviation Duty Only. (Note: Analogous to the restricted line officers designated for Engineering Duty Only.) The Board instead recommended commissioning a number of reserve naval aviators and transferring them to the regular line of the Navy, which was the approach eventually adopted by the Navy Department.

== World War II ==
In late 1940, King left the General Board to become commander-in-chief of the Atlantic Fleet. A year later, in the aftermath of the Japanese attack on Pearl Harbor, King was elevated to Commander in Chief, United States Fleet, and promptly forced Chief of Naval Operations Harold R. Stark to release his assistant, Rear Admiral Royal E. Ingersoll, to succeed King in command of the Atlantic Fleet.

To take Ingersoll's place, King suggested Stark select either Horne, who was awaiting retirement on the General Board, or Rear Admiral Russell Willson, the superintendent of the Naval Academy: "Take the one you want to replace Ingersoll and I will take the other as my chief of staff." Stark picked Horne, who served as assistant to the chief of naval operations from December 27, 1941, to March 25, 1942, Horne was promoted to vice admiral on March 10, 1942.

=== Vice Chief of Naval Operations ===
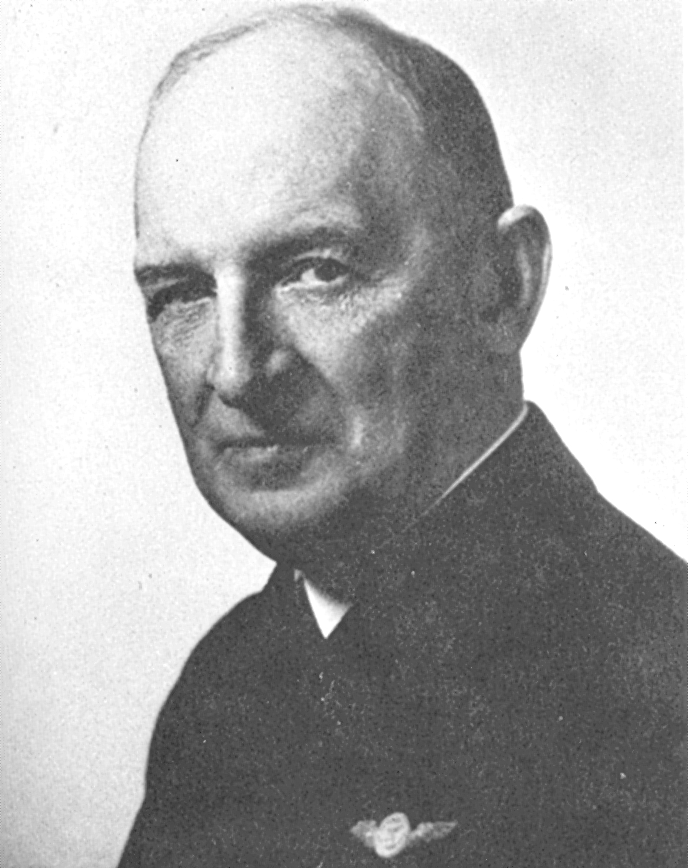
Horne as Vice Chief of Naval Operations

On March 12, 1942, President Franklin D. Roosevelt issued Executive Order 9096, which unified the titles of Commander in Chief, United States Fleet (COMINCH) and Chief of Naval Operations (CNO). COMINCH wielded supreme command over the operating forces of the Navy, while the CNO was responsible for their training and logistical support. The order also established a three-star Vice Chief of Naval Operations (VCNO), who would head the CNO staff and act as CNO in the absence of the COMINCH-CNO. The result was that Stark was sent to Europe, King became COMINCH-CNO, and Horne became the first VCNO.

During the war, Horne was actually de facto CNO, since King was preoccupied with his COMINCH and Joint Chiefs of Staff duties. King and Horne informally agreed that King would manage the war, leaving logistical matters to Horne and his top assistant, Rear Admiral Lynde D. McCormick. Horne was also the officer responsible for budgets and financial management, the Navy's principal uniformed spokesman before Congress, and a member—and later chairman—of the Army–Navy Petroleum Board from May 1943 to September 1945.

As head of naval logistics, Horne was the Navy's principal point of contact for the Truman Committee, a special Senate committee headed by Senator Harry S. Truman that was charged with investigating waste, corruption, and profiteering in the wartime defense industry. Called to testify about alleged waste in the Pacific theater, Horne unapologetically retorted that it was impossible to run a war effort on that scale without some waste. "I don't deny for a moment that there are billions of dollars worth of materiel out on Pearl Harbor and elsewhere in the Pacific. ... But I just have to resolve the balance in favor of giving the commanders what they say they need, and at the same time, I'm fully aware that you gentlemen are interested, as I am, in saving. So where we can cure the waste, we're doing it, but we're not going to stop short."

He was awarded the Legion of Merit for providing "astute guidance in staff planning and logistical collaboration concerned with problems of logistical supply", and was promoted to full admiral on January 29, 1945, with date of rank December 15, 1944.

=== Relationship with King ===
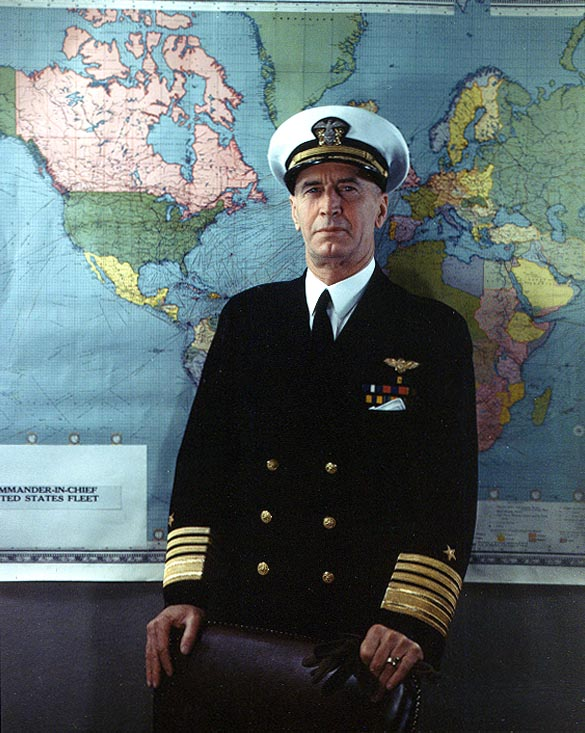
Admiral Ernest J. King

Horne and King regarded each other with respect and mutual suspicion. Horne told a friend that one of the things he could do for the Navy was to keep King under control, while King admired Horne's intelligence and administrative skill but distrusted his ambition. "Horne was a yes man", King mused later, "but a very able man all the same ... I have never liked him and never knew why."

King's biographer speculated that his dislike for Horne stemmed from Secretary of the Navy Frank Knox's attempt to relieve King of one of his COMINCH-CNO titles. At the First Quebec Conference in August 1943, Knox surprised King with the suggestion that King relinquish his CNO title to Horne. Upon returning to Washington, King confronted Horne. "Where in hell did this idea come from?" King demanded. "How did you manage it?" Horne pleaded innocence, claiming that he had had nothing to do with it, and that when asked about it, he had told Knox that the existing setup was fine. King did not believe him.

Knox's campaign against King peaked in mid-January 1944, when a draft executive order threatened to separate fleet command from naval operations by making King a five-star "Admiral of the Navy and Commander, United States Fleets," while making Horne a four-star "Chief of Naval Logistics and Material" reporting directly to the Secretary of the Navy. However, on February 11, 1944, Congressman Carl Vinson, the chairman of the House Naval Affairs Committee, revoked his support for Knox's proposal. Knox died in April, ending the proposal.

In September 1944, King elevated his COMINCH chief of staff, Vice Admiral Richard S. Edwards, to the newly created position of "Deputy COMINCH-Deputy CNO," which inserted Edwards above Horne in the chain of command. Horne's unhappiness at the effective demotion resulted in a flurry of newspaper and radio criticism, which King tried to quell by issuing a press statement on October 4, 1944, that asserted "the duties now assigned to Vice Admiral Edwards do not constitute a demotion of Vice Admiral Horne or anyone else."

After the war, King was more candid. "Of course Horne would have liked to be CNO. Who wouldn't? But I am afraid he was not quite frank with me. I eased him out, finally."

=== Postwar ===
On September 29, 1945, King reorganized the Navy, eliminating the COMINCH position and leaving the CNO as the undisputed uniformed head of the Navy. Under the reorganization, which became effective on October 10, 1945, Edwards became VCNO while Horne was temporarily retained as a special assistant to the CNO so that he could handle demobilization and logistic rollback issues. Horne was placed on the retired list on August 1, 1946, but remained on active duty as special assistant and head of the Board of Review for Decorations and Medals until April 1947.

== Personal life ==
In retirement, Horne resided in Coronado, California. He married Alma Beverly Cole McClung on August 4, 1903; she died in 1957. He married his nurse, Edythe, a few months before his death; he died at the age of 79 on October 21, 1959, in the San Diego Naval Hospital.

A Christian Scientist, Horne neither smoked nor drank. He and his wife Alma were regarded with affection by the young couples they entertained at their home during the war. One staff officer remembered Horne as "the greatest listener I ever knew".

Horne was widely admired as an exceptional administrator. "I don't believe that the country will ever know the full contribution to the prosecution of the recent war by this quiet, modest, sincere, but tremendously effective and capable naval officer", said New York Congressman W. Sterling Cole. Truman Committee staffer John J. Tolan marveled, "In an entire lifetime, one is extremely fortunate to watch such men at work." Tolan once asked Horne why he spent so much time drawing and redrawing boxes in organizational charts. Horne replied, "It isn't the drawing of the boxes that takes my time. It is the selection of the names that go in the boxes. Sometimes, in order to use the right man to his full capacity, you have to change the boxes."

Captain Paul Pihl, an aircraft procurement officer on Horne's staff, blamed a number of the Navy's wartime supply failures on Horne's hands-off management style and lack of logistics expertise. "It was his job", Pihl said after the war, "and he didn't have the faintest idea what the hell he was going to do with it. Horne had had no previous experience with logistics, and he tended to go by the old Navy tradition that you didn't get involved in what was happening in the engine room unless something went wrong, and then you brought a person up and bawled him out for it."

Horne was also an outspoken critic of the Nuremberg Trials, having stated: "As it has been my belief that the after-war emotional hysteria was responsible for the trial and imprisonment of the German high-ranking military and naval officers, and that we should reflect with shame upon our efforts for revenge upon men doing what we would do for our own country, I am glad to have my name included in any effort to atone for the injustice done to Admiral Doenitz and to any others who were likewise unfairly treated because they loved their country."

== Awards ==
Horne's decorations include:

- Naval Aviator insignia
- Navy Cross
- Navy Distinguished Service Medal
- Legion of Merit
- Navy Unit Commendation
- Spanish Campaign Medal
- Santiago Medal
- Philippine Campaign Medal
- World War I Victory Medal
- American Defense Medal
- American Campaign Medal
- European–African–Middle Eastern Campaign Medal
- World War II Victory Medal

Horne also received a number of foreign honors:

Country	Honor
France	Commander, Legion of Honor
Poland	Commander's Cross with Star, Order of Polonia Restituta
Republic of China	Order of the Cloud and Banner with Yellow Grand Cordon
Belgium	Croix de Guerre with Palm
Belgium	Grand Officer in the Order of Leopold with Palm
Brazil	Grand Cross, Order of Naval Merit
United Kingdom	Knight Commander in the Military Division of the Order of the British Empire
Japan	Order of the Sacred Treasure, Third Class

- The guided-missile cruiser USS Horne (CG-30) was named in his honor.

== Bibliography ==
- Albion, Robert Greenhalgh (1980), Makers of Naval Policy, 1798–1947, Annapolis, Maryland: Naval Institute Press
- Buell, Thomas B. (1980), Master of Sea Power: A Biography of Fleet Admiral Ernest J. King, Boston, Massachusetts: Little, Brown & Company
- Clark, J. J.; Reynolds, Clark G. (1967), Carrier Admiral, New York: David McKay Company, Inc.
- Fuchs, James R. (1970), Oral History Interview with John Abbott, Independence, Missouri: Harry S. Truman Library
- Fuchs, James R. (1983), Oral History Interview with John H. Tolan, Jr., Independence, Missouri: Harry S. Truman Library
- King, Ernest J.; Whitehill, Walter Muir (1952), Fleet Admiral King: A Naval Record, New York City, New York: W. W. Norton & Company, Inc.
- Miller, Edward S. (1991), War Plan Orange, Annapolis, Maryland: Naval Institute Press
- Richardson, James O. (1973), On the Treadmill to Pearl Harbor: The Memoirs of Admiral James O. Richardson, Washington, D.C.: Government Printing Office
- Schuon, Karl (1964), U.S. Navy Biographical Dictionary, New York: Franklin Watts, Inc.
- Who's Who In America, vol. 26, Chicago: The A.N. Marquis Company, 1950–1951

Military offices
Preceded by Royal E. Ingersoll	Assistant to the Chief of Naval Operations; 23 December 1941 – March 26, 1942	Succeeded by Himself; As Vice Chief of Naval Operations
Preceded by Himself; As Assistant to the Chief of Naval Operations	Vice Chief of Naval Operations; March 26, 1942 – October 10, 1945	Succeeded by Richard S. Edwards
