= Arthur L. Willard =

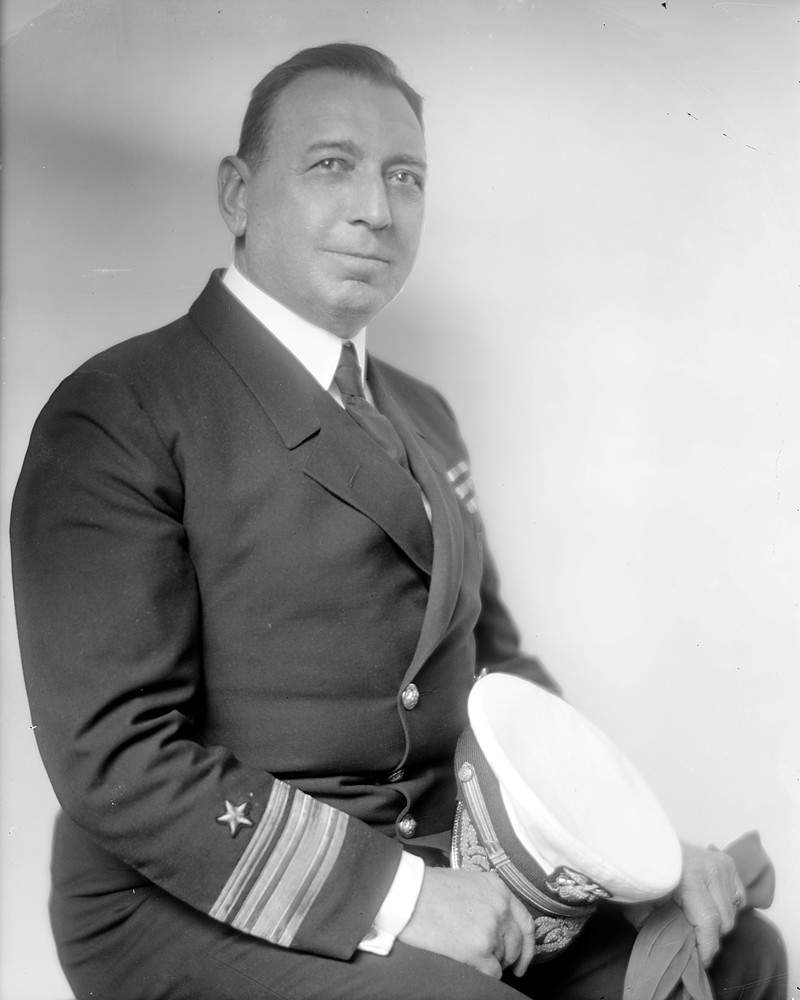
- Arthur Willard while serving as Captain of the USS New Mexico (1919-1921)
- Born: 21 February 1870; Kirksville, Missouri, U.S.
- Died: 7 April 1935 (aged 65); Washington D.C., U.S.
- Burial place: Arlington National Cemetery Arlington, Virginia
- Military career
- Allegiance: United States of America
- Branch: United States Navy
- Service years: 1891–1935
- Rank: Vice Admiral
- Commands: USS Hancock (AP-3) (1913–1915); Washington Navy Yard (1917–1919), (1927–1930); USS New Mexico (BB-40) (1919–1921); Scouting Force (1930–1932); Fifth Naval District 1932–1935.
- Conflicts: Spanish–American War; World War I
- Awards: Navy Cross; Legion of Honour(France); Order of Leopold (Belgium)

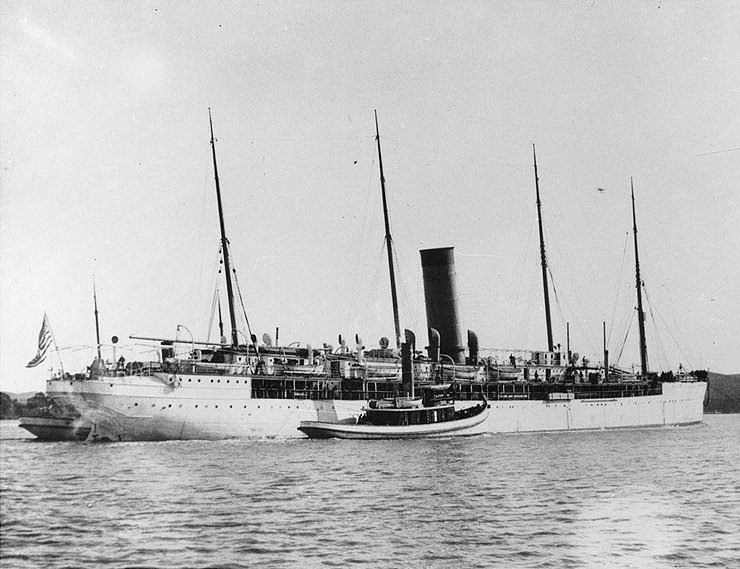
USS Hancock, Arthur L. Willard's first command.

Arthur Lee Willard (February 21, 1870 – April 7, 1935) was a U.S. Navy Admiral who served his nation in two wars and was awarded the Navy Cross. He was also awarded the Legion of Honor by the French government and the Order of Leopold by the King of Belgium.

== Early life and education ==
Willard was born in Kirksville, Missouri, the son of Anna and Lewis A. Willard, a small-town merchant. After receiving his primary and secondary education in Kirksville schools, he attended the First District Normal School (now known as Truman State University) in Kirksville beginning in 1883. He left the Normal School just months prior to graduation, as he had been accepted to the United States Naval Academy, where he graduated in 1891.

== Career ==
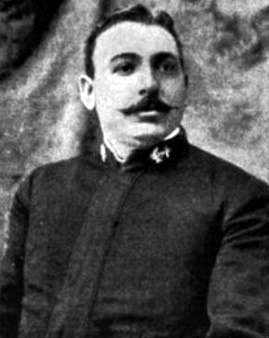
Arthur Willard as a young officer, around 1900.

Arthur Willard's long and distinguished naval career very nearly ended before it had chance to begin. In 1888 the U.S. Naval Academy was rocked by a hazing scandal that involved Third Class Cadet Willard. He along with fifteen other cadets were expelled from the academy, however the intercession of Missouri Congressman Willam M. Hatch on his behalf caused President Grover Cleveland to order Willard's reinstatement.

Making the most of his second chance, Ensign Willard gained positive notoriety during the Spanish–American War. While serving on the gunboat USS Machias (PG-5), on May 11, 1898, he led a shore party and in the face of enemy fire planted the U.S. flag on a Spanish blockhouse overlooking Diana Bay near Cardenas, Cuba. For this exploit he received a $100 prize offered by the New York Herald to the first serviceman to raise the American flag on Cuban soil. In addition the Missouri legislature presented Willard with a jeweled officers sword.

Following his Cuban adventure, Willard's career advanced rapidly by the day's standards. By 1905 he held the rank of full lieutenant and was stationed aboard the USS Maine (BB-10) during which time he was a participant in the around-the-world journey of the Great White Fleet. In 1913 Arthur Willard received his first ship command, the USS Hancock (AP-3). It proved to be an exciting one as the Hancock participated in several instances of gunboat diplomacy under his captaincy, including landing US Marines at Vera Cruz, Mexico in 1914.

America's entry into World War I in April, 1917 saw a great need for more naval armament. However many delays were occurring in the ordnance factories at Washington Navy Yard. Now holding the rank of captain, Willard was brought in as new commandant and promptly put things in order. It was for this invaluable service that Willard was awarded the Navy Cross by President Woodrow Wilson. Below is the citation for his award:

The President of the United States of America takes pleasure in presenting the Navy Cross to Captain Arthur Lee Willard, United States Navy, for exceptionally meritorious service in a duty of great responsibility as Superintendent of the Naval Gun Factory, which, under his command, was rapidly expanded to meet the extraordinary demands created by the war, and so efficiently administered as to maintain a steady flow of absolutely essential ordnance material to the service.

In addition to his Navy Cross, Captain Willard was also honored by France with the Legion of Honor, and the Order of Leopold by the King of Belgium. Following his service at Washington Navy Yard, Captain Willard returned to sea duty as commander of the battleship USS New Mexico (BB-40) in 1919. Renewed problems with naval armaments saw Willard assigned as Special Aide for Navy Yards to the Secretary of the Navy in 1921. In this capacity he was in charge of all US Navy industrial plants and shipbuilding on the eastern US coast. In 1930, now holding the rank of vice admiral, Willard was assigned as commander of a series of US fleet exercises that validated the increasing importance of aircraft carriers and attacks launched from beyond battleship gun range. These fleet exercises also inspired the creation of a two-ocean navy in the 1930s by the Roosevelt administration.

In 1932 Vice Admiral Willard was chosen to command the Fifth Naval District, a post which he held until retirement shortly before his death on April 7, 1935. He is buried in Arlington National Cemetery. Willard Park, located at Washington Navy Yard, is named in his honor.

Admiral Willard was a companion of the Naval Order of the United States.
