= Newport News (disambiguation) =

Newport News, Virginia is a city in Hampton Roads, Virginia

Newport News may also refer to:

- Newport News Shipbuilding, a major shipyard in the United States
- USS Newport News, the name of several United States Navy vessels
- Newport News, newspaper printed from 1839 by abolitionist William Shreve Bailey
- The Newport Daily News, daily newspaper serving Newport County, Rhode Island
