= WICO =

WICO may refer to:

== Media ==
- WICO-FM, a radio station (101.1 FM) licensed to serve Snow Hill, Maryland, United States
- WJKI (AM), a radio station (1320 AM) licensed to serve Salisbury, Maryland, which held the call sign WICO from 1956 to 2018
- WNKZ-FM, a radio station (92.5 FM) licensed to serve Pocomoke City, Maryland, which held the call sign WICO-FM from 2009 to 2017

== Other ==
- Wico Corporation, a manufacturer of joysticks for arcade video games and home use
- The West Indian Company (WICO), a former private company now fully owned by the Public Finance Authority of the United States Virgin Islands
