= USS Kittery (AK-2) =

Cargo ship of the United States Navy

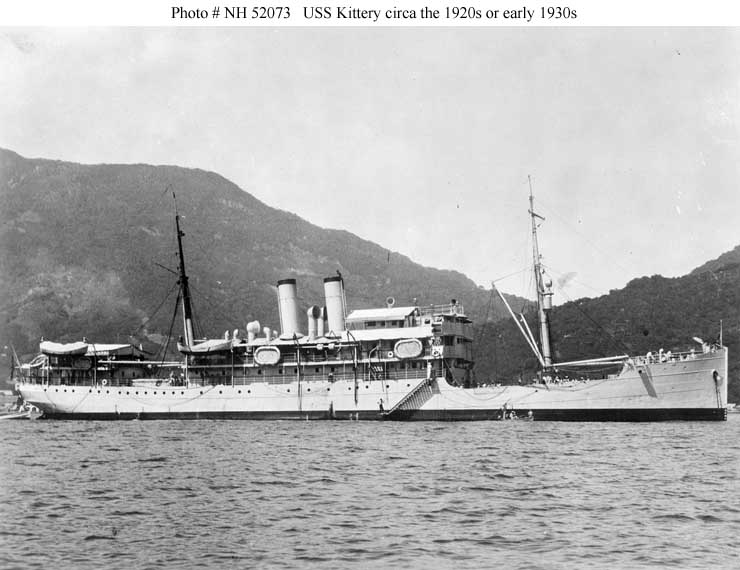

History

German Empire
- Name: Präsident (1905–18)
- Owner: Hamburg America Line (1905–18)
- Builder: Schichau Werft, Bremerhaven
- Laid down: date unknown
- Launched: 30 November 1905
- Out of service: interned at San Juan, 1915
- Fate: Acquired by US Navy, 14 May 1917

United States
- Name: Kittery
- Namesake: Kittery, Maine
- Owner: US Navy (1918–33); US Shipping Board (1933–37)
- Acquired: 14 May 1917
- Commissioned: 6 July 1918
- Decommissioned: 5 April 1933
- Stricken: 11 April 1933
- Identification: Hull symbol AK-2
- Fate: Scrapped 1937

General characteristics
- Tonnage: 1,839 GRT
- Displacement: 3,300 t (3,200 long tons)
- Length: 293 ft 8 in (89.51 m)
- Beam: 40 ft 6 in (12.34 m)
- Draft: 13 ft 3 in (4.04 m)
- Installed power: 1,400 shp (1,000 kW)
- Propulsion: triple expansion steam engine
- Speed: 15.5 kn (17.8 mph; 28.7 km/h)
- Complement: 87
- Armament: none

USS Kittery (AK-2) was a German passenger liner of the Hamburg America Line (HAPAG) that was built in 1905 as Präsident. The United States Navy took her over in 1918, renamed and commissioned her as a troopship and military cargo transport in World War I. She was transferred to the United States Shipping Board in 1933 and scrapped in 1937.

== Acquiring a captured German freighter ==
Schichau Seebeckwerft of Bremerhaven built Präsident, launching her on 30 November 1905. Hamburg America Line operated her in the West Indies and Caribbean.

After the outbreak of World War I, she was suspected of supplying German cruisers in the Leeward Islands. After several cruises, in which she narrowly avoided capture by British and French ships, she entered the port of San Juan, Puerto Rico, early in 1915 and was interned with the HAPAG ship Odenwald and the captured collier KD-III. After the United States entered the war in April 1917, the US Navy took her over on the authority of President Woodrow Wilson's Executive Order 2619-A of 14 May 1917. Präsident sailed to the United States escorted by USS Hancock and was refitted for naval service. She was commissioned as USS Kittery 6 July at Philadelphia, Pennsylvania.

== World War I North Atlantic service ==
Assigned to cargo and troop transport service between the United States and the West Indies, Kittery left Philadelphia on 18 July. Operating out of Charleston, South Carolina, she made monthly trips during the remainder of the war to supply US forces.

== Post-war operations ==
After the war she continued cargo service from Charleston and Norfolk, Virginia, for more than 15 years, making scores of runs to West Indian ports. After a final trip to Guantanamo Bay Naval Base, Port-au-Prince, and Cap-Haïtien, she arrived Norfolk 21 December 1932. She left on 28 January 1933 and reached Philadelphia two days later.

In June 1925, two U.S. Navy nurses were accused of smuggling liquor in their luggage aboard the USS Kittery. This was the first instance in the U.S. Navy's history where a woman was court-martialed. They were both acquitted after a short trial.

== Decommissioning ==
Kittery decommissioned on 5 April, and her name was struck from the Navy List 11 April 1933. She was transferred to the United States Shipping Board 26 June 1933 and scrapped in 1937.

== Military awards and honors ==
Kittery's crew members were authorized the following medals:

- World War I Victory Medal (with Transport Clasp)
