= USS Hancock (AP-3) =

Transport ship used by US Navy

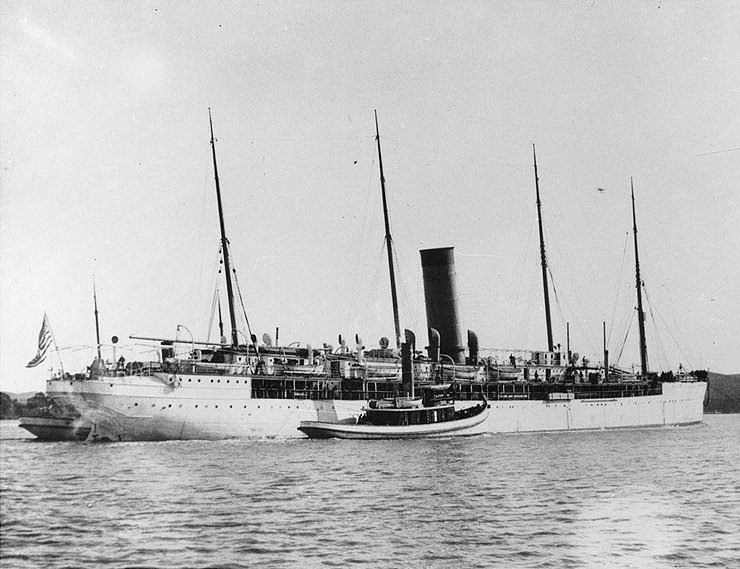
- USS Hancock at Mare Island Navy Yard, early 1900s

History
- Name: USS Hancock
- Namesake: John Hancock
- Builder: John Elder & Co, Govan
- Yard number: 222
- Launched: 10 March 1879
- Completed: 1879
- Acquired: 8 November 1902
- Commissioned: 20 Nov 1902 – 9 Mar 1903; 21 Sep 1903 – 3 Sep 1919; 15 Mar 1920 – 1 Sep 1925
- Reclassified: Classified as AP-3, 1920; reclassified as IX-12, 1921
- Fate: Sold, 21 May 1926, scrapped

General characteristics
- Tonnage: 5,146 GRT, 2,928 NRT
- Displacement: 8,500 tons
- Length: 456.2 ft (139.0 m)
- Beam: 45.4 ft (13.8 m)
- Draft: 24 ft 3 in (7.39 m)
- Depth: 35.7 ft (10.9 m)
- Propulsion: 1 × triple expansion engine; 1 × screw
- Speed: 13 knots (24 km/h)
- Complement: 278
- Armament: 6 x single 3" gun mounts

USS Hancock (AP-3) was a transport ship in the United States Navy. Acquired by the Navy in 1902, she took part in World War I and a number of US military and diplomatic ventures prior to that. She was named for Founding Father John Hancock.

Hancock, the third US Navy ship to bear the name, was built in 1879 by John Elder & Co, Glasgow, Scotland. Formerly the passenger liner SS Arizona, she was purchased by the War Department during the Spanish–American War and transferred to the Navy 8 November 1902. She was commissioned 20 November 1902.

== Operational service ==
Hancock sailed from San Francisco for the East Coast 14 December 1902 via Valparaíso, Chile; Montevideo, Uruguay; and Bahia, Brazil. She arrived New York Navy Yard 21 February 1903 and decommissioned 9 March 1903 for fitting out. Recommissioned 21 September 1903, she served as receiving ship at the New York Navy Yard until relieved by Washington 6 August 1913.

=== Mexican revolution ===
Hancock departed New York 15 September 1913 and arrived at the Philadelphia Navy Yard the following day to be fitted out as a Marine transport.

In 1914 she sailed for the Gulf of Mexico, having embarked the 1st Regiment, Advance Base Brigade of Marines.

On 17 April or 19 April 1914 she arrived at Tampico.

On 22 April and/or on 1 May 1914 she arrived at Veracruz.

She landed the Marines at Vera Cruz, Mexico, to assist in the occupation of that city resulting from the arrest of the crew of a whaleboat of Dolphin (PG-24) by soldiers of General Huerta, aspirant to the Mexican presidency. During the tense months that followed, Hancock transported refugees uprooted by the Mexican Revolution between the coast of Mexico and Galveston, Texas, as she delivered supplies for the United States Expeditionary Force in Mexico.

=== Caribbean operations ===
Other trouble spots erupted in the Americas. Both Haiti and the Dominican Republic were going through a series of violent revolutions endangering the lives and property of foreigners and inviting foreign intervention. This situation demanded a buildup of American strength in the area. As a result, as the diplomatic crisis with Mexico eased, Hancock embarked a battalion of Marines from Vera Cruz and transported them to Guantanamo, Cuba. She returned to Norfolk 25 July 1914 to embark the 5th Marine Regiment and got underway 30 July 1914 to cruise in waters off Haiti and Santo Domingo to be on hand to protect American interests against any eventuality. She returned to Norfolk 23 December 1914 for a general overhaul.

Hancock resumed duty cruising in the Caribbean. She continued to transport Marines, stores, provisions, mail, and other cargo to forces ashore in Mexico, Haiti, and Santo Domingo. From 12 to 30 September 1916 she assisted in the salvage of material from Memphis (CA-10) after the cruiser was driven ashore by a storm surge in the harbor of Santo Domingo. Hancock carried the ill-fated ship's crew, stores, fittings, and ammunition to the Norfolk Navy Yard.

=== Takeover of Danish West Indies ===
Hancock was at Guantanamo Bay 27 March 1917 when ordered to proceed to St. Thomas in the Danish West Indies, where the Danish Government was to transfer the islands to the United States. She sailed the next day, embarking a Marine Detachment at Santo Domingo before arrival at St. Thomas, 30 March 1917. On 31 March 1917, Hancock's captain, Comdr. Edwin T. Pollock, USN, took over the islands in the name of the United States of America. At 1600 hours when the transfer became effective, Commander Pollock assumed the position of Acting Governor of the Virgin Islands.

=== World War I ===
On 6 April 1917 the United States declared war on Germany six days later Hancock took possession of German steamers Wasgenwald and Calabria interned there.

Hancock arrived at San Juan, Puerto Rico, 18 May 1917 to take possession of two more interned German steamships Präsident and Odenwald. She embarked 29 German prisoners of war 23 May 1917, and stood out of San Juan harbor that afternoon to tow Odenwald to the Philadelphia Navy Yard where she arrived 1 June 1917.

Hancock was assigned to the U.S. Cruiser and Transport Force to embark troops of the 1st American Expeditionary Force 13 June 1917. She got underway 17 June 1917 as Flagship of Troop Convoy Number 4 and arrived without mishap at St. Nazaire, France, 2 July 1917. Returning to Philadelphia 22 July 1917, her principal service until September 1919 was transportation of Marine passengers and military stores to ports in the West Indies and the Gulf of Mexico. She returned to Philadelphia 3 September 1919 and decommissioned 18 October 1919.

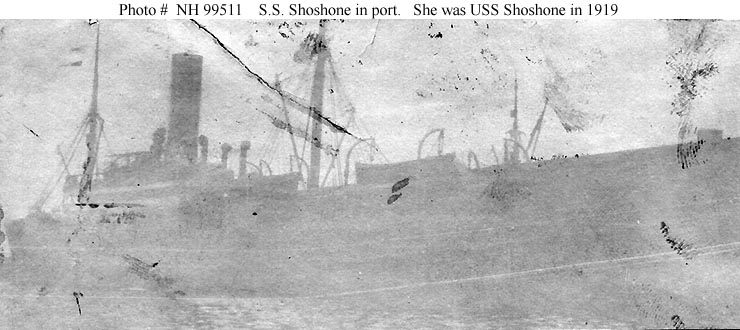
Wasgenwald as USS Shoshone (ID-1760)

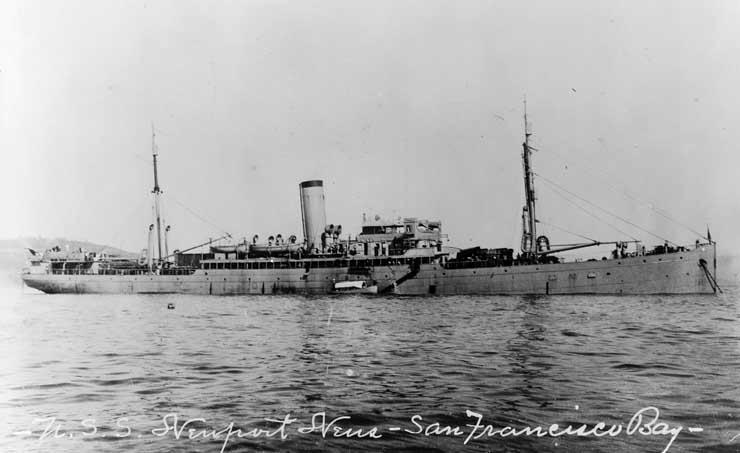
Odenwald as USS Newport News (AK-3)

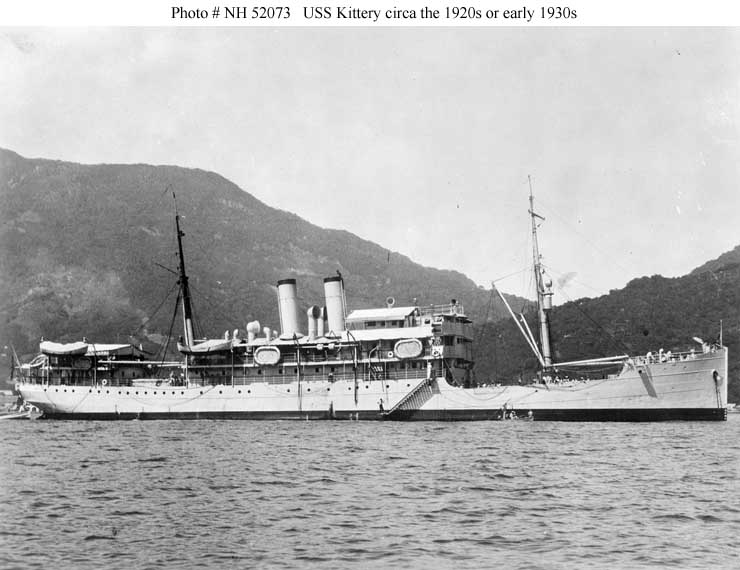
Präsident as USS Kittery (AK-2)

=== Final commission ===
Hancock recommissioned 15 March 1920 and departed Philadelphia 2 April 1920 for Rosyth, Scotland, to man and fit out former German warships SMS Ostfriesland and Frankfurt which had been allocated to the United States as spoils of war. She returned to New York with the vessels 9 August 1920.

After repairs at Philadelphia, she resumed transport duties between the East coast and the West Indies, 5 October 1920. She got underway from Philadelphia 5 March 1921 for Mare Island, California, and entered San Francisco Bay 20 April 1921. The ship then sailed for the Hawaiian Islands 5 May 1921 arriving Honolulu 14 May 1921, and served as receiving ship at Pearl Harbor until 1925.

She was towed from Pearl Harbor 9 July 1925 arrived at the Mare Island Navy Yard 25 July 1925, placed out of commission 1 September 1925, struck from the Navy List and sold 21 May 1926.
