= Lynde D. McCormick =

United States admiral (1895–1956)

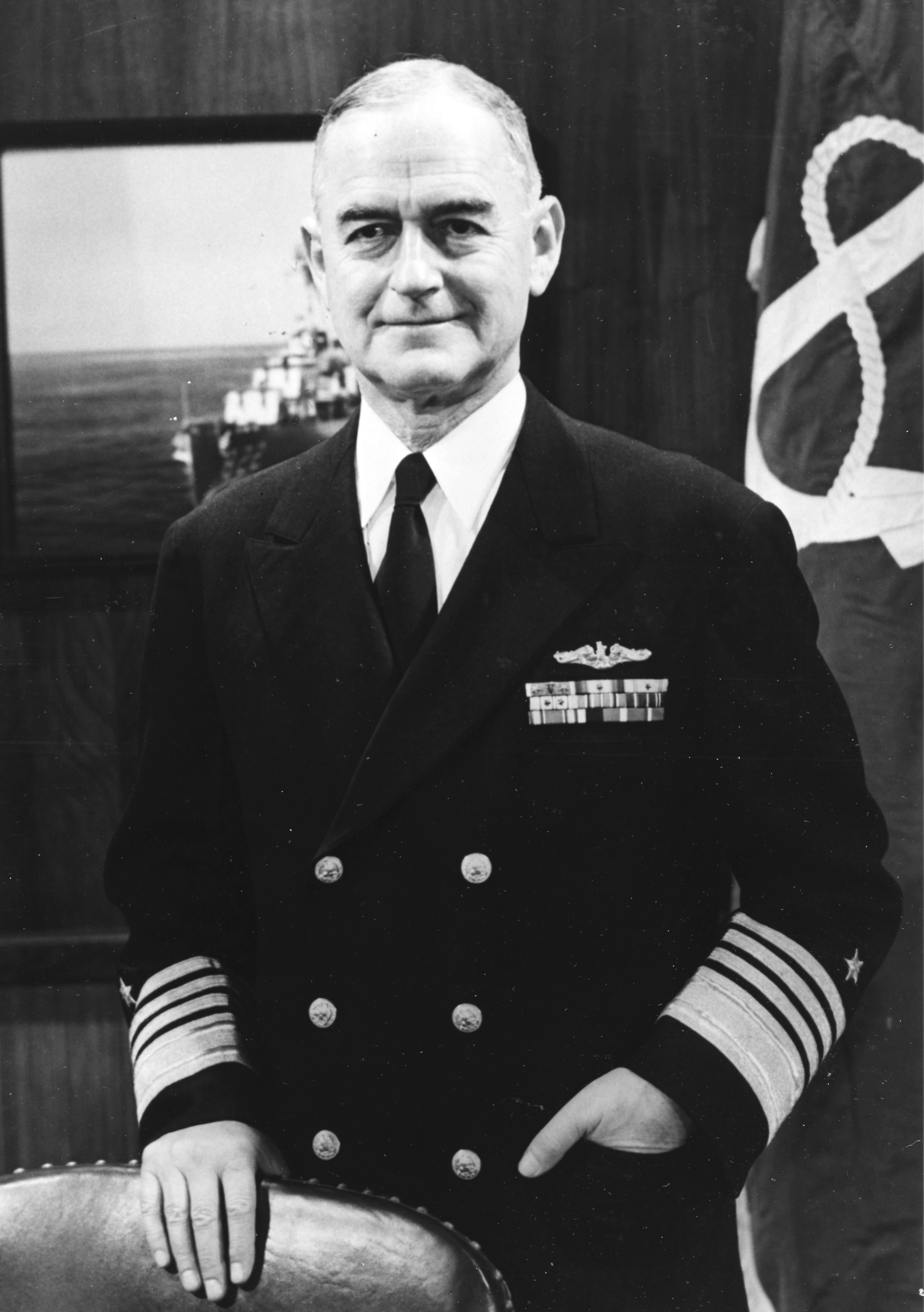
- Born: August 12, 1895; Annapolis, Maryland, U.S.
- Died: August 16, 1956 (aged 61); Newport, Rhode Island, U.S.
- Military career
- Branch: United States Navy
- Service years: 1915–1956
- Rank: Admiral
- Commands: United States Atlantic Fleet; Naval War College
- Conflicts: World War I World War II
- Awards: Legion of Merit (3)

Lynde Dupuy McCormick (August 12, 1895 – August 16, 1956) was a four-star admiral in the United States Navy who served as vice chief of naval operations from 1950 to 1951 and as commander in chief of the United States Atlantic Fleet from 1951 to 1954, and was the first supreme allied commander of all NATO forces in the Atlantic.

== Early career ==
Born in Annapolis, Maryland to the former Edith Lynde Abbot and naval surgeon, late Rear admiral Albert Montgomery Dupuy McCormick, he attended St. John's Preparatory School and College, a military school in Annapolis. In 1911, he was appointed by President William Howard Taft to the United States Naval Academy, where he played lacrosse and soccer and, as a first classman, was business manager of the Academy yearbook, the Lucky Bag. He graduated second in a class of 183 and was commissioned ensign in the United States Navy in June 1915.

=== World War I ===
His first assignment was aboard the battleship Wyoming, operating in the Caribbean Sea and along the eastern seaboard. In November 1917, following the United States entry into World War I, Wyoming and the rest of Battleship Division 9 (New York, Delaware, and Florida) joined the British Grand Fleet as its Sixth Battle Squadron and were present at the surrender of the German High Seas Fleet in the North Sea after the armistice.

In April 1919, McCormick was assigned as aide and flag lieutenant on the staff of Commander Battleship Division 4, United States Fleet. He served aboard the battleship South Carolina from June to September, then became aide and flag lieutenant to Commander Destroyer Squadron 4, Pacific Fleet, aboard the squadron flagship Birmingham. He transferred to the destroyer Buchanan in December 1920.

=== Interwar ===
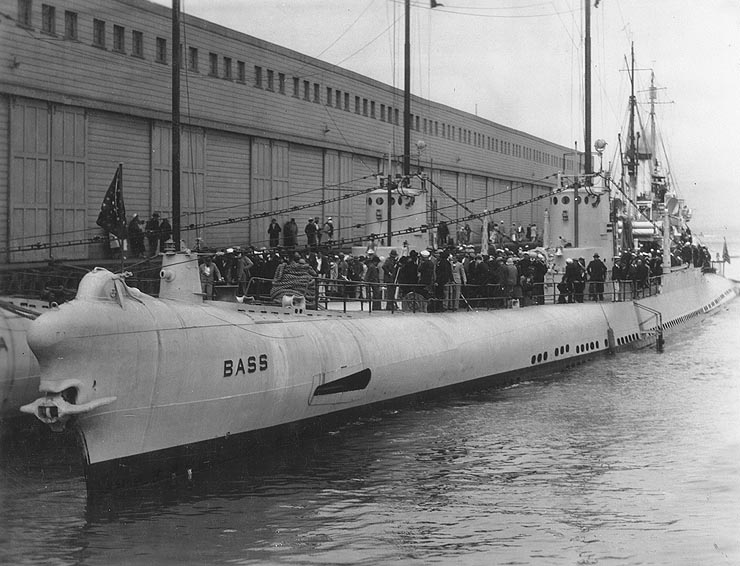
USS Bass (SS-164) (right), former V-2

In August 1921, he briefly commanded the destroyer Kennedy, before going ashore in October as an instructor in the Department of Navigation at the Naval Academy.

He began a long association with submarine warfare in June 1923 when he became a student at the Submarine School in New London, Connecticut. He then served until June 1924 in the submarine S-31, operating with Submarine Division 16 in the Pacific. After short assignments with the submarine S-37 and submarine tender Canopus, he commanded the submarine R-10, based at Honolulu, Hawaii, from August 1924 until June 1926, when he was detailed to the Naval Academy as a member of the executive department. In August 1928, he began almost three years as commanding officer of the fleet submarine V-2, operating with Submarine Division 20 in support of the United States Fleet in maneuvers off the West Coast, the Hawaiian Islands, and the Caribbean Sea.

In May 1931, he began a three-year tour at the Naval Academy as aide to the new superintendent, Rear Admiral Thomas C. Hart. When Hart finished his tour as superintendent in June 1934, McCormick rejoined the fleet as navigator of the light cruiser Marblehead. He took command of the fleet oiler Neches in April 1936.

In June 1937, he was enrolled as a student in the senior course at the Naval War College in Newport, Rhode Island. After completing the course in May 1938, he remained at the Naval War College for an additional year as a member of the staff.

== World War II ==
In June 1939, he became operations officer on the staff of Vice Admiral Charles P. Snyder, Commander Battleships, Battle Force, aboard Snyder's flagship West Virginia. When Snyder was elevated to command of the entire Battle Force in January 1940, McCormick followed him to the Battle Force flagship California as operations officer on the Battle Force staff. Snyder requested early relief in January 1941 after his superior, Admiral James O. Richardson, was summarily replaced by Admiral Husband E. Kimmel, the new Commander in Chief, Pacific Fleet. Upon assuming command in February 1941, Kimmel recruited McCormick to be assistant war plans officer on the Pacific Fleet staff, in which post McCormick was serving during the Japanese attack on Pearl Harbor.

After the Pearl Harbor disaster, Kimmel was relieved by Admiral Chester W. Nimitz, who retained Kimmel's entire staff. McCormick became Nimitz' war plans officer in April 1942, serving in that capacity during the battles of the Coral Sea, Midway, and Guadalcanal. On June 30, 1942, McCormick was injured in a seaplane accident while accompanying Nimitz to Alameda Naval Air Station. Despite suffering a fractured vertebra, McCormick never went on the sick list, choosing to continue on active duty while wearing a plaster cast for three months.

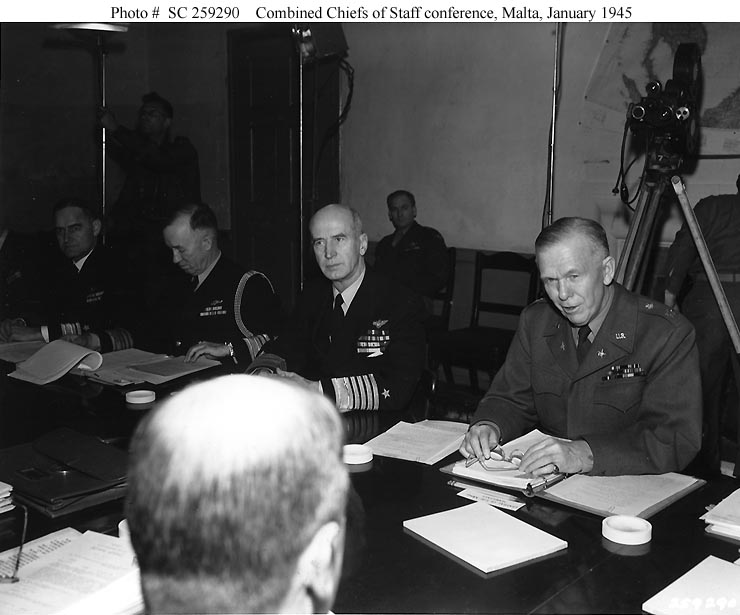
As assistant chief of naval operations for logistics plans (seated, far left), with the Combined Chiefs of Staff in Malta, July 31, 1945

He was promoted to rear admiral on July 15, 1942, and, upon completing his tour on Nimitz' staff, was awarded the Legion of Merit for "exceptionally meritorious conduct in the performance of outstanding services to the Government of the United States as War Plans Officer on the Staff of the Commander in Chief, Pacific Fleet and Pacific Ocean Areas, from February 1, 1941, to January 14, 1943. He was detached in February 1943 to take command of the battleship South Dakota, operating off the Atlantic coast and later with the British Home Fleet.

From October 1943 to March 1945, he was assigned to the staff of Chief of Naval Operations Ernest J. King as assistant chief of naval operations for logistics plans, with additional duty as chairman of the Joint Logistics Committee of the Joint Chiefs of Staff, in which capacity he accompanied King to the second Quebec and Yalta conferences. His logistics work earned him a Gold Star in lieu of a second Legion of Merit. The accompanying citation stated: "His mastery of the relationship between strategy and logistics and his understanding of the process of procuring and distributing critical items have been important factors in meeting the needs of area and Fleet Commanders. In a field in which the magnitude and complexity of the problems were without precedent in the history of the Navy, he has displayed conspicuous ability and brilliant leadership." He would later be quoted as saying, "I am tempted to make a slightly exaggerated statement: that logistics is all of warmaking, except shooting the guns, releasing the bombs, and firing the torpedoes."

In March 1945, he returned to the Pacific theater as Commander of Battleship Division 3, serving as Task Group Commander for two months at the Battle of Okinawa. He was awarded a second Gold Star for his Legion of Merit "as Commander of a Battleship Division, of a Task Group, and of a Fire Support Unit, in action against enemy Japanese forces on Okinawa, Ryukyu Islands, from March through May 1945."

== Postwar ==
After the war, he participated in the initial occupation of Japan until November 1945, when he was assigned as chief of staff and aide to Admiral John H. Towers, Commander in Chief, Pacific Fleet and Pacific Ocean Areas (CINCPAC/CINCPOA). McCormick was named deputy commander in chief in December, and was advanced to the temporary rank of vice admiral on February 13, 1946.

He served as Commander, Battleships-Cruisers, Atlantic Fleet, from February 1947 until November 1948. In January 1948, he led a mission to Buenos Aires, Argentina, aboard the heavy cruiser Albany to establish cordial relations with the Argentine military. He reverted to his permanent rank of rear admiral upon being assigned as Commandant, Twelfth Naval District, headquartered in San Francisco, California, on December 8, 1948.

=== Vice Chief of Naval Operations ===
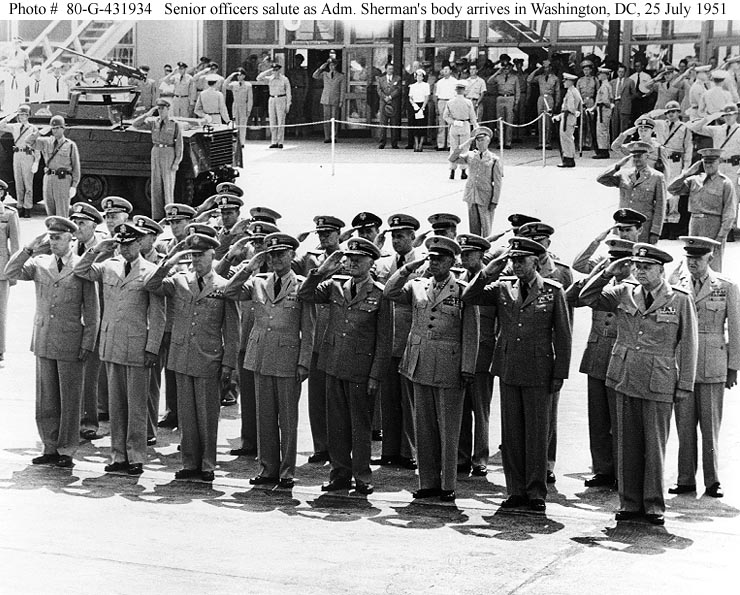
As acting chief of naval operations (fourth from left), saluting the arrival of Admiral Forrest P. Sherman's body at Washington National Airport, July 25, 1951

In 1949, Chief of Naval Operations Louis E. Denfeld was fired for his participation in the Revolt of the Admirals and replaced by Admiral Forrest P. Sherman. Because the new chief of naval operations was a naval aviator, he was expected to select a new vice chief of naval operations, since the incumbent, Vice Admiral John D. Price, was also an aviator and it was established practice to have only one aviator in the two top staff positions. Sherman selected McCormick, whose long experience with undersea warfare was regarded as significant by naval observers because submarine and anti-submarine warfare were expected to be the Navy's principal role in the event of another war.

Upon relieving Price as vice chief, McCormick was again promoted to vice admiral, with date of rank April 3, 1950. On December 20, 1950, President Harry S. Truman nominated McCormick for the rank of admiral, increasing the number of full admirals in the Navy to five. Truman's declaration of a national emergency had lifted the legal limits on the number of three- and four-star officers, and McCormick was promoted to grant him equal standing with the vice chiefs of staff of the Army and Air Force. He was confirmed in his new rank on December 22, 1950.

Sherman died unexpectedly on July 22, 1951, while on a diplomatic trip to Europe. As acting chief of naval operations, McCormick was one of six candidates considered to succeed Sherman, along with Admirals Arthur W. Radford, Robert B. Carney, and William M. Fechteler; and Vice Admirals Richard L. Conolly and Donald B. Duncan. During the selection process, McCormick took himself out of the running by loudly expressing "his desire for a fleet command." Fechteler was named chief of naval operations on August 1, 1951, and McCormick was selected to replace Fechteler as commander in chief of the Atlantic Fleet. When the change was announced, press reports noted that this would be McCormick's first fleet command, and speculated that the lack of a fleet command in his record had eliminated him from consideration as Sherman's successor.

=== Commander in Chief, Atlantic Fleet ===
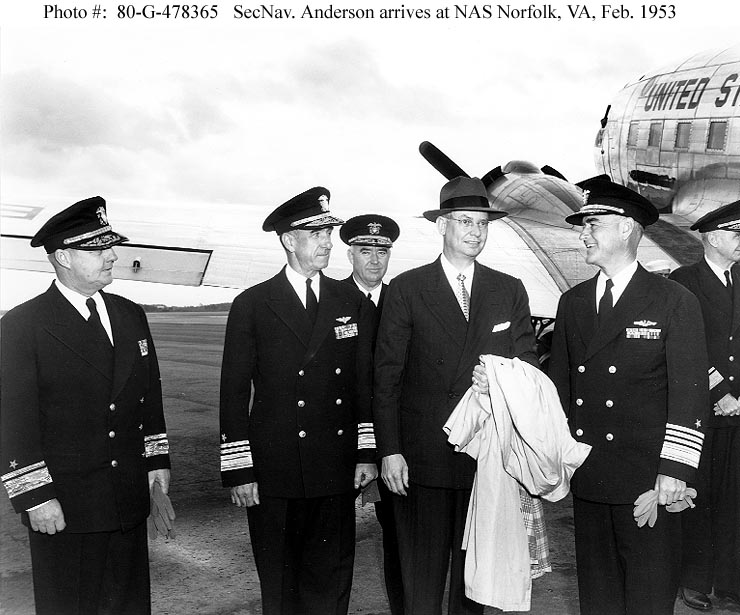
As Commander in Chief, Atlantic Fleet (right), welcoming Secretary of the Navy Robert B. Anderson to Naval Air Station Norfolk, Virginia, February 21, 1953

He became Commander in Chief, Atlantic Command and Commander in Chief, Atlantic Fleet (CINCLANT/CINCLANTFLT) on August 15, 1951.

A month later, at the recommissioning ceremony for the aircraft carrier Wasp, McCormick aroused comment by indicating that atomic bombs had been developed that were small enough to be carried by the light bombers deployed on aircraft carriers. "Eventually, I think every carrier will be equipped with atomic bombs. Since their reduction in size they have become more available for carrier use." His remarks were consistent with his previous statement while acting chief of naval operations that atomic weapons use should be treated more normally: "It is in our interest to convince the world at large that the use of atomic weapons is no less humane than the employment of an equivalent weight of so-called conventional weapons. The destruction of certain targets is essential to the successful completion of a war with the U.S.S.R. The pros and cons of the means to accomplish their destruction is purely academic."

As Fechteler's CINCLANT successor, McCormick inherited Fechteler's long-delayed appointment as the first supreme allied commander of NATO naval forces in the Atlantic. Fechteler's nomination for the post was announced on February 19, 1951, but had been stalled by British opposition led by former Prime Minister Winston Churchill, who took offense at the concept of subordinating the Royal Navy to an American admiral and demanded that a British admiral be appointed instead. Incumbent Prime Minister Clement Attlee confirmed Fechteler's nomination in July, but Fechteler almost immediately vacated command of the Atlantic Fleet to become chief of naval operations, giving Churchill the opportunity to reopen the issue when he resumed the premiership in October. Churchill now argued that there was no need for a single supreme naval commander, suggesting that the Atlantic instead be divided into American and British sectors, but the United States insisted on unity of command and Churchill ultimately had to yield to American pressure, reluctantly consenting to McCormick's appointment in January 1952.

Despite his distaste for the idea of any American as supreme Atlantic commander, Churchill had no objection to McCormick personally, declaring that McCormick would "inspire the highest confidence" as that commander. To assuage British sensitivities, McCormick said that he regarded the Royal Navy as a model for his men, that he knew London better than New York, and that he was equally at home in Portsmouth, Hampshire, and Portsmouth, New Hampshire.

=== Supreme Allied Commander Atlantic ===
McCormick was appointed Supreme Allied Commander Atlantic (SACLANT) on January 30, 1952, and opened SACLANT headquarters in Norfolk, Virginia on April 10. As SACLANT, he reported directly to the NATO Standing Group, and was coequal in the NATO military hierarchy with General of the Army Dwight D. Eisenhower, Supreme Allied Commander Europe (SACEUR). McCormick's new command extended from the North Pole to the Tropic of Cancer and from the shores of North America to those of Europe and Africa, with the exception of the English Channel and British coastal waters. It was said to be the largest naval command given an individual since Christopher Columbus had been appointed Grand Admiral of the Ocean Seas in the fifteenth century. It was also said that McCormick was an admiral without a fleet, since he would only command allied forces during wartime. However, as commander in chief of the Atlantic Fleet, he exercised peacetime control over most of his actual striking power.

Soon after becoming SACLANT, McCormick traveled to every NATO capital seeking pledges of contributions from allied navies. He hoped that the European allies could begin by preparing to secure their own national waters in the event of war, but quickly found that the smaller nations viewed SACLANT as a concern primarily for the United States, Britain, and Canada, the major NATO sea powers. He complained to the NATO Standing Group that Europe treated his appointment as an excuse for complacency: "Now that SACLANT is appointed, we no longer have any naval worries, he will take care of everything for us...we need not do anything now."

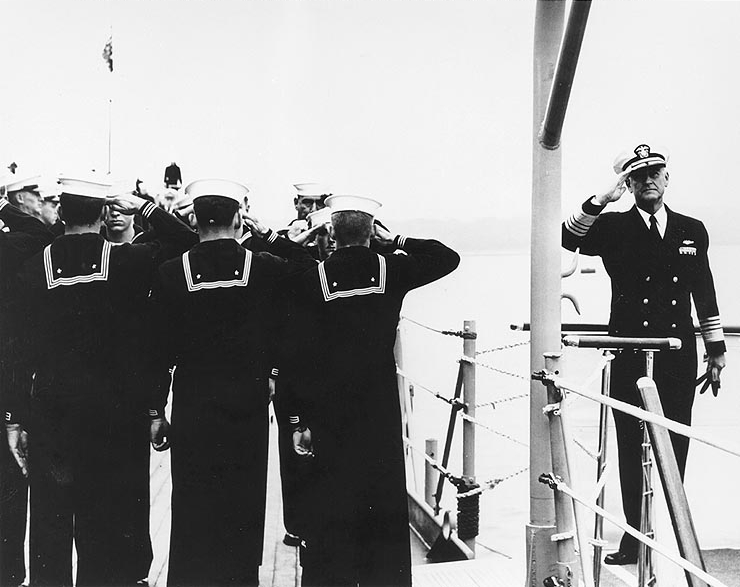
As Supreme Allied Commander Atlantic (right), boarding USS Columbus (CA-74) during Operation Mainbrace, September 20, 1952

In September 1952, NATO held its first major naval exercise, Operation Mainbrace, commanded jointly by McCormick and SACEUR Matthew B. Ridgway. Operation Mainbrace involved 160 allied ships of all types and tested SACLANT's ability to "provide northern flank support for a European land battle." The exercise assumed that Soviet forces had already swept through West Germany and were moving into Denmark and Norway, and was intended in part to "reassure the Scandinavian signatories that their countries could be defended in the event of war." At the conclusion of the exercise, McCormick and Ridgway stated that Operation Mainbrace had highlighted several weaknesses in NATO for future correction. "Many questions have been asked during the exercise as to whether any great lessons were learned from it. The answer is no. ... A test of this sort enables us to determine our weaknesses and the corrective measures we must take. Thus far certain weaknesses have been revealed, but we regard none of them as insurmountable. Mainbrace is not an ending—it is merely a beginning."

The next year, NATO conducted a follow-up exercise, Operation Mariner, from September 16 to October 4, 1953. McCormick called Operation Mariner "the most complete and widespread international exercise ever held," involving 500,000 men, 1,000 planes, and 300 ships from nine navies. The exercise tested a variety of allied naval capabilities, ranging from command relationships to mine warfare and intelligence, although "there was no strategic concept other than Blue was fighting Orange." Convoys crossed the Atlantic while defending against submarines and surface ships. In order "to keep us all atomic minded," both sides launched and defended against simulated nuclear attacks. McCormick viewed the exercise as a qualified success, showing that ships and aircraft of the disparate NATO navies could cooperate effectively even under adverse weather conditions, although there had been problems with communications and logistical support. After the exercise, McCormick told a dinner of the American Council on NATO on October 29, 1953, that the Kremlin was "well aware" of the importance of the transatlantic sea lane and was readying submarines to fight another possible Battle of the Atlantic. While Operation Mariner had demonstrated that NATO could control the Atlantic given sufficient forces, he warned, "The forces we have available at present to counter the potential underseas menace would be spread precariously thin for this task."

At the end of McCormick's tour, Chief of Naval Operations Robert B. Carney looked for a successor who would be better at standing up to the British staff at SACLANT headquarters. "I had felt a great deal of concern about the handling of the United States interests down there and in the Atlantic, vis-à-vis the British...I had felt that the United States viewpoint had been handled rather naively in some previous instances and that it was imperative that we put somebody down there who could take care of these interests." Carney selected Admiral Jerauld Wright, who relieved McCormick on April 12, 1954.

=== President, Naval War College ===
After stepping down as SACLANT, McCormick was appointed President of the Naval War College in the rank of vice admiral on May 3, 1954.

The most significant event of his presidency was the establishment in 1956 of the naval command course, a new course for senior naval officers from up to 30 allied and friendly nations, organized and directed by Captain Richard G. Colbert at the behest of Chief of Naval Operations Arleigh A. Burke. The Naval War College staff was initially unenthusiastic about the new course, worrying that it would detract from the regular courses. However, McCormick had already witnessed the difficulties caused by a lack of inter-allied understanding during large-scale SACLANT operations like Operation Mainbrace, and he gave Burke his full cooperation. Burke recalled, "[McCormick] was absolutely correct that this new course should not reduce the caliber of the other work the War College was doing. The president and his staff made many helpful suggestions right from the start and after it was going awhile, their enthusiasm grew, perhaps due to the quality of the foreign officers assigned."

On August 16, 1956, McCormick suffered a heart attack in his quarters around 3 a.m., and died four hours later at the Naval Hospital in Newport at the age of 61, the day before the start of classes for the 1957 course year. Students and faculty were stunned, since he had appeared to be in excellent health. Greeting the incoming students the next day, McCormick's chief of staff and acting successor, Rear Admiral Thomas H. Robbins, Jr., stated that McCormick would not have wanted his death to interfere with college routine, declaring, "The Admiral's love and devotion to this college could not be excelled. He spent his last days here devoting himself selflessly of his energies, broad experience, and wisdom to keep this college in the forefront of the military education field and in preparing officers to better serve our country in these perilous times."

== Personal life ==
The scion of an old Navy family, McCormick was remembered as a man of extreme reserve of manner who was viewed by associates as the precisely correct quarterdeck admiral. A SACLANT subordinate recalled him as "a delightful, smart clean-cut gentleman." He is buried with his wife in the Naval Academy cemetery.

He married Lillian Addison Sprigg Graham, on October 2, 1920. Lillian was the widow of his best friend and roommate at USNA, Ivan Montrose Graham. Ivan had died on September 21, 1918, of influenza, leaving his wife and an infant son he had never seen. When Lynde and Lillian married, the then two-year-old boy was formally adopted and his name became Montrose Graham McCormick. "Monty" McCormick, who graduated from USNA in 1939 commanded a submarine during World War II and was killed in a plane crash in Australia in 1945. The McCormicks had two more sons, Navy officer Lynde Dupuy Jr. who graduated from USNA with the class of 1944 (which graduated a year early); and Marine James Jett II, who was severely wounded at the Battle of Okinawa. The amount of service to country given by this one family has rarely been duplicated His father, Rear Admiral Albert Montgomery Dupuy McCormick, was a Spanish–American War veteran and former fleet surgeon for the Atlantic Fleet.

== Honors and awards ==
He was the namesake of the guided-missile destroyer Lynde McCormick. His decorations include the Legion of Merit with two Gold Stars; the World War I Victory Medal, Grand Fleet Clasp; the American Defense Service Medal; the European-African-Middle Eastern Campaign Medal; the Asiatic-Pacific Campaign Medal; the American Campaign Medal; and the World War II Victory Medal.

Submarine Warfare insignia
1st Row	Legion of Merit w/ "V" device and two gold stars		
2nd Row	World War I Victory Medal w/ "Escort" clasp	American Defense Service Medal w/ "A" device	American Campaign Medal
3rd Row	European-African-Middle Eastern Campaign Medal	Asiatic-Pacific Campaign Medal w/ two bronze service stars	World War II Victory Medal
4th Row	Navy Occupation Service Medal w/ "Asia" clasp	National Defense Service Medal	Philippine Liberation Medal

== Legacy ==
The Charles F. Adams class guided missile destroyer USS Lynde McCormick (DDG-8) was named after him.

Military offices
Preceded by John D. Price	Vice Chief of Naval Operations; April 1950 – August 1951	Succeeded by Donald B. Duncan
Preceded by William M. Fechteler	Commander in Chief, United States Atlantic Fleet; August 15, 1951 – April 12, 1954	Succeeded by Jerauld Wright
Preceded by Richard L. Conolly	President of the Naval War College; May 3, 1954 – August 16, 1956	Succeeded by Thomas H. Robbins, Jr.
