= USS Newport News (AK-3) =

German-built cargo liner

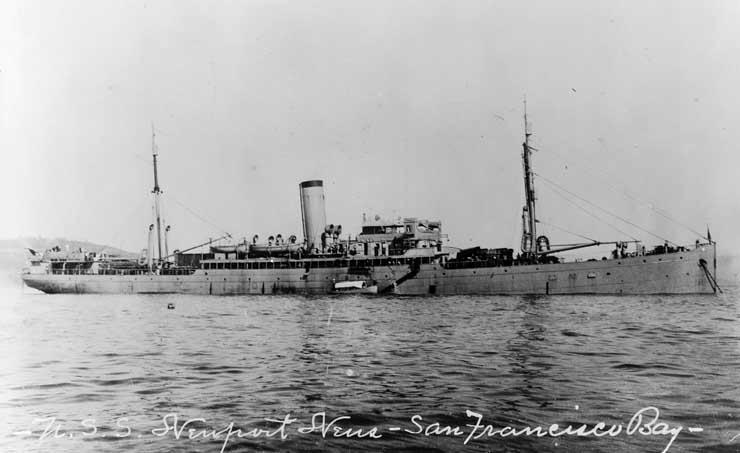
- USS Newport News in San Francisco Bay, circa 1919

History
- Name: 1903: St. Jan; 1907: Odenwald; 1917: Newport News; 1925: Arctic
- Namesake: 1903: St Jan, Danish West Indies; 1907: Odenwald; 1917: Newport News, Virginia; 1925: Arctic
- Owner: 1904: Dansk Vestindiske Kompagni; 1905: Østasiatiske Kompagni; 1907: Hamburg America Line; 1919: US Shipping Board; 1925: Alaska Packers' Association
- Operator: 1904: A Richelieu; 1917: United States Navy
- Port of registry: 1904: (Denmark) Copenhagen; 1907: (German Empire) Hamburg; 1919: (United States) New York; 1925: (United States) San Francisco
- Builder: Flensburger Schiffbau-Gesellschaft
- Yard number: 232
- Launched: 12 December 1903
- Completed: 1904
- Acquired: for US Navy, 14 May 1917
- Commissioned: into US Navy, 14 Jul 1917
- Decommissioned: from US Navy, 1 Aug 1924
- Identification: 1904: code letters NMPR; 1907: code letters RPMW; 1917: hull symbol AK-3; 1918: call sign DQS; 1919: US official number 215052; 1919: code letters LHCP; 1934: call sign: WQCM
- Fate: scrapped January 1937

General characteristics
- Type: cargo liner
- Tonnage: 3,343 GRT, 2,136 NRT
- Displacement: 10,000 tons
- Length: 371 ft 5 in (113.21 m) overall; 355.0 ft (108.2 m) registered
- Beam: 45.0 ft (13.7 m)
- Draft: 23 ft 6 in (7.2 m)
- Depth: 24.5 ft (7.5 m)
- Decks: 2
- Installed power: 480 NHP, 2,400 ihp
- Propulsion: 1 × triple-expansion engine; 1 × screw
- Speed: 13 knots (24 km/h)
- Complement: in US Navy: 150
- Armament: 4 × 3-inch/23-caliber guns
- Notes: sister ships: St. Thomas, St. Croix

USS Newport News (AK-3) was a cargo liner that was launched in Germany in 1903 as St. Jan. She was renamed Odenwald in 1907 when she changed owners, and Newport News in 1917 when the United States seized her. She was renamed Arctic in 1925, and scrapped in 1937.

She was the first of three US Navy ships to be named USS Newport News. She served in the United States Navy from 1918 until 1924. Her Naval service was transatlantic until 1919, when she was transferred to the Pacific.

As Odenwald she belonged to the Hamburg America Line (HAPAG) from 1907 until 1917. She was the first of three HAPAG ships of this name. The second Odenwald was a motor ship that entered service in 1923 and was captured in 1941. The third was a motor ship that entered service in 1951.

When the First World War began in August 1914, Odenwald took refuge in Puerto Rico. In March 1915 she tried to leave port without permission, so the United States Army garrison fired at her. This led to a diplomatic incident between the US and Germany.

== Building ==
In 1904 the Dansk Vestindiske Kompagni (DVK) took delivery of a set of three single-screw cargo liners. They were for a service that it ran jointly with HAPAG between Copenhagen, Hamburg and the Caribbean, and they were named after the three main islands of the Danish West Indies. Burmeister & Wain in Copenhagen built St. Thomas, and Flensburger Schiffbau-Gesellschaft in Flensburg built her sister ships St. Jan and St. Croix.

St. Jan's lengths were 371 ft 5 in (113.21 m) overall and 355.0 ft (108.2 m) registered. Her beam was 45.0 ft (13.7 m), her depth was 24.5 ft (7.5 m), and her draft was 23 ft 6 in (7.2 m). Her tonnages were 3,343 GRT, 2,136 NRT and 10,000 tons displacement. St. Jan had a three-cylinder triple-expansion engine, which was rated at 480 NHP or 2,400 ihp and gave her a speed of 13 knots (24 km/h).

== St. Jan and Odenwald ==
DVK registered St. Jan at Copenhagen. Her code letters were NMPR. By 1905 her ownership was registered in the name of DVK's parent company, the Østasiatiske Kompagni (ØK).

St. Thomas, St. Jan and St. Croix were found to be too big for their intended use, and in 1907 ØK withdrew from the joint service. HAPAG bought the three ships, renamed them Niederwald, Odenwald, and Sachsenwald respectively, and registered them in Hamburg. Odenwald's code letters were RPMW. By 1908 she was equipped to burn oil instead of coal.

At 11:00 hrs on 1 August 1914, with the First World War imminent, HAPAG announced the suspension of its services. Germany ordered its merchant ships to take refuge in the nearest German or neutral port. Odenwald and another HAPAG ship took refuge in San Juan, Puerto Rico. By late January 1915 she had been joined by another HAPAG ship, Präsident, and the British collier Farn, which the cruiser SMS Karlsruhe had captured as a prize and renamed KD-III. "KD-III" was short for Kohlendampfer III, meaning "Coal-Steamer 3".

Odenwald's cargo was mostly coffee and hides from various South American ports. After about three months in San Juan, all of her cargo was unloaded onto a wharf in the San Antonio Canal. The cargo was then forwarded to New York on the New York and Porto Rico Line's mail steamers, such as the Brazos. However, by 23 January 1915, about a third of Odenwald's cargo was still on the wharf in San Juan.

== Attempt to leave Puerto Rico ==
In March 1915 Odenwald took on 1,800 tons of coal and a large amount of provisions. The United States Customs Service responded by having a customs officer aboard her continually, to report in her movements. Her Master requested permission to leave port, but the Collector of Customs refused, claiming that he needed permission from Washington DC. According to one report, the Collector withheld permission for three days. Earlier in the war the US had proclaimed its neutrality, stating "The President is authorized and empowered to direct the Collectors of Customs under the jurisdiction of the United States to withhold clearance from any vessel, American or foreign, which he has reasonable cause to believe to be about to carry arms, ammunition, men, or supplies to any warship or tender or supply ship of a belligerent nation in violation of the obligations of the United States as a neutral nation..."

On 19 March the commandant of the US Army garrison in San Juan, Lieutenant-Colonel Burnham, in the Collector's presence, warned the German Consul and Odenwald's Master that he would use force if necessary to prevent the ship leaving port without permission. On 20 March Odenwald prepared to leave port. Odenwald had deployed Germans in fishing boats, pretending to be night-fishing, to mark the channel out of the harbour to enable the ship to leave port without a pilot. The Collector summoned support from garrison, which sent an infantry unit with fixed bayonets, and a platoon of mountain artillery with six machine guns, with orders to open fire on the ship if she tried to leave port. The troops were in position from 23:00 hrs on 20 March, and withdrawn at 02:00 hrs on 21 March.

At 14:50 hrs on 21 March Odenwald again started preparing to leave port. Federal officers telephoned the garrison at the Castillo San Felipe del Morro. At 14:55 hrs, Lieutenant Teófilo Marxuach ordered the Morro's guns to open fire. Accounts differ as to how many guns were fired, the caliber of the guns, or how many shots they fired. Puerto Rican and US sources at the time insisted that they were warning shots. Germany at the time insisted that the Morro tried to hit Odenwald without first firing warning shots.

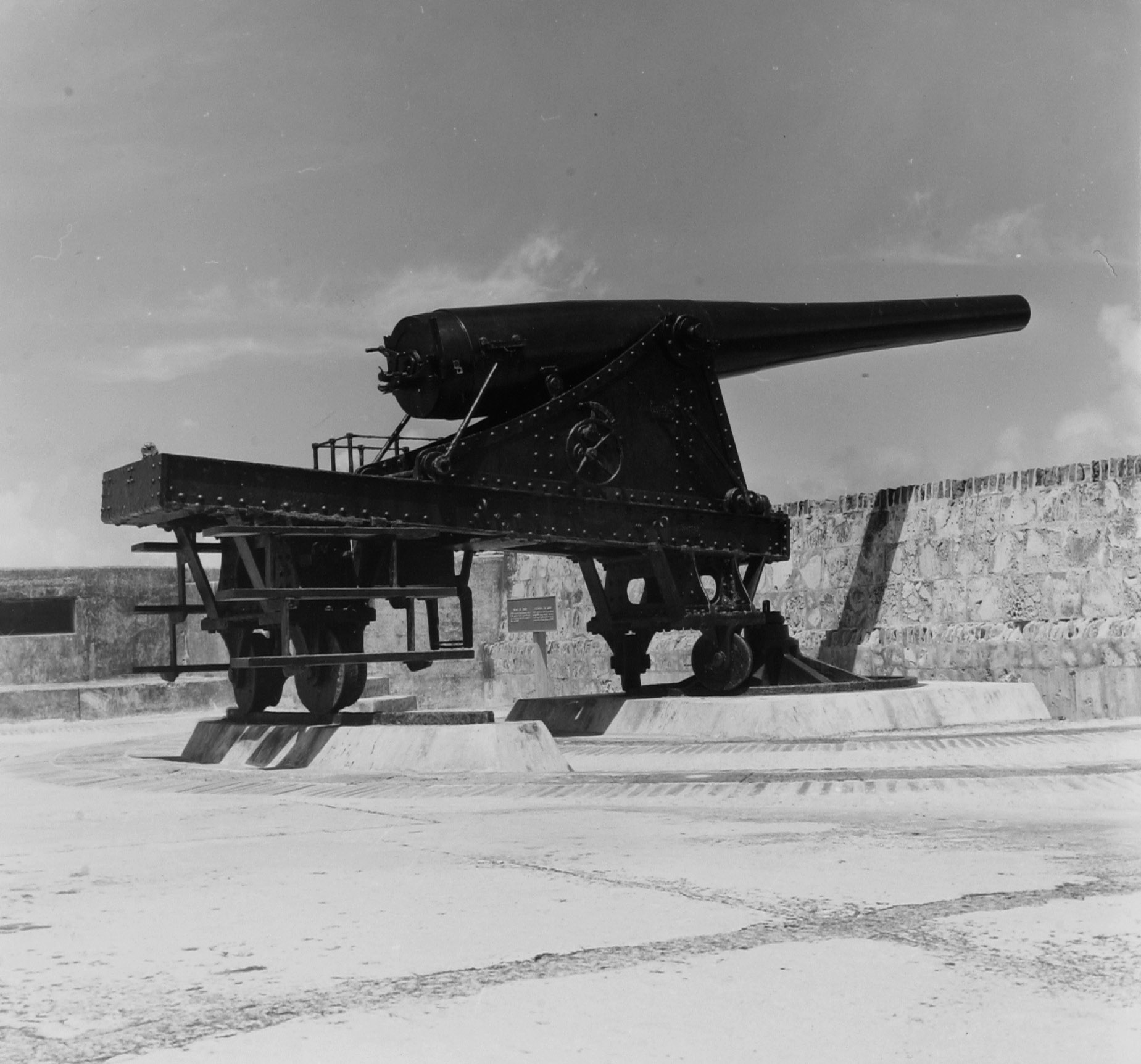
One of the coastal defense guns of the Castillo San Felipe del Morro, photographed in 1964

The Boletín mercantil de Puerto Rico reported that six guns of the Morro fired warning salvoes: two across Odenwald's bow, and one across her stern. She was warned that the next shots would be aimed at her hull. Odenwald hove to and dropped anchor. The same report claimed that a total of 58 shells were fired. However, the report is not specific about the caliber, and the total may include machine-gun rounds.

On 22 March The New York Times reported that the Morro fired "three shots". The next day it quoted Lieut-Col Burnham as reporting "warning shots were fired with machine guns and one shot was fired across her bows with a five-inch rifle from El Morro". On 30 March The New York Times reported that one seven-inch gun fired one shell across Odenwald's bow. One modern source says that the Morro fired one round from a 4.7-inch gun at a range of 300 yards.

International rules, as set forth by the US Naval War College, required that "the vessel is brought to by firing a gun with a blank charge. If this is not sufficient to cause her to lie to a shot is fired across the bows, and in case of flight or resistance force can be used to compel the vessel to surrender." Germany alleged that the Morro fired solid shot, without first firing a blank warning shot, and that the Morro continued "a sharp fire" even after Odenwald hove to. The United States Department of State replied to the German government that "the United States authorities at San Juan in the performance of their duties avoided any act endangering the safety of the vessel and the lives of the persons on board and exercised no greater force than was necessary to prevent the illegal departure of the Odenwald from the port of San Juan".

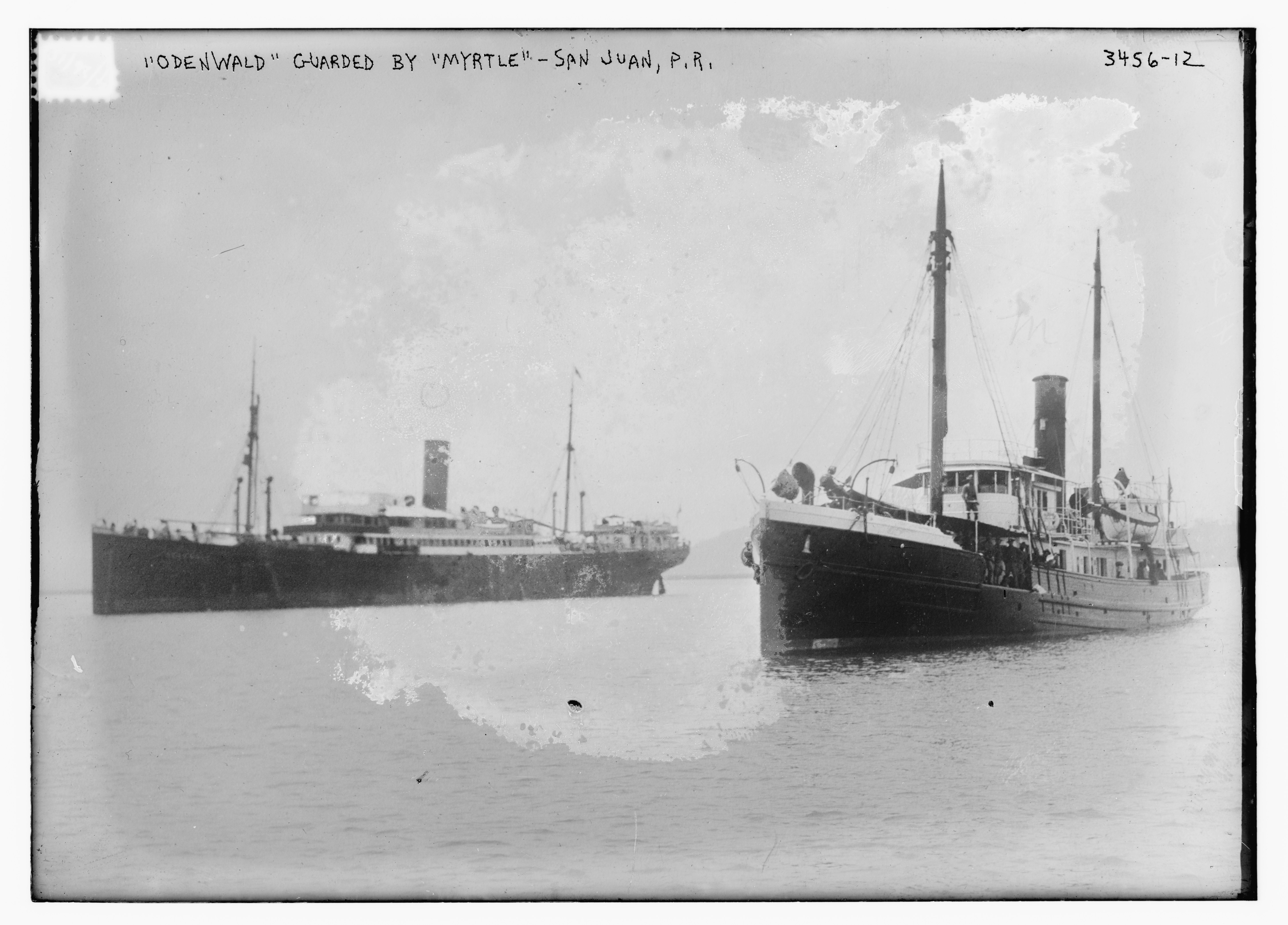
USLHT Myrtle (right) guarding Odenwald (left) in San Juan in 1915

After Odenwald hove to, the Collector and Deputy Collector of Customs, the chief customs officer, the head of the wireless station at Puerta de Tierra, the Attorney General, a pilot, and other officials, went out to her in three launches. The chief customs officer and the pilot boarded the ship; the chief customs officer ordered her back into port; and by 16:45 hrs she was returning to port, under the pilot's command. Two customs officers were put aboard Odenwald, and a picket of soldiers was embarked on the buoy tender Ivy, which was deployed as a guard ship to watch over her. Soldiers could not be put aboard Odenwald, as she was a merchant ship.

On 23 March the United States Department of the Navy sent two destroyers to San Juan to deter Odenwald from trying to leave again.

== USS Newport News ==
On 1 February the Imperial German Navy resumed unrestricted submarine warfare. On 3 February Josephus Daniels, United States Secretary of the Navy, ordered the internment of all German and Austro-Hungarian ships in US-controlled ports, including Odenwald in San Juan. On 6 April 1917 the US declared war on Germany, and at the same time seized 91 German ships in its ports, including KD-III, Odenwald, and Präsident in San Juan.

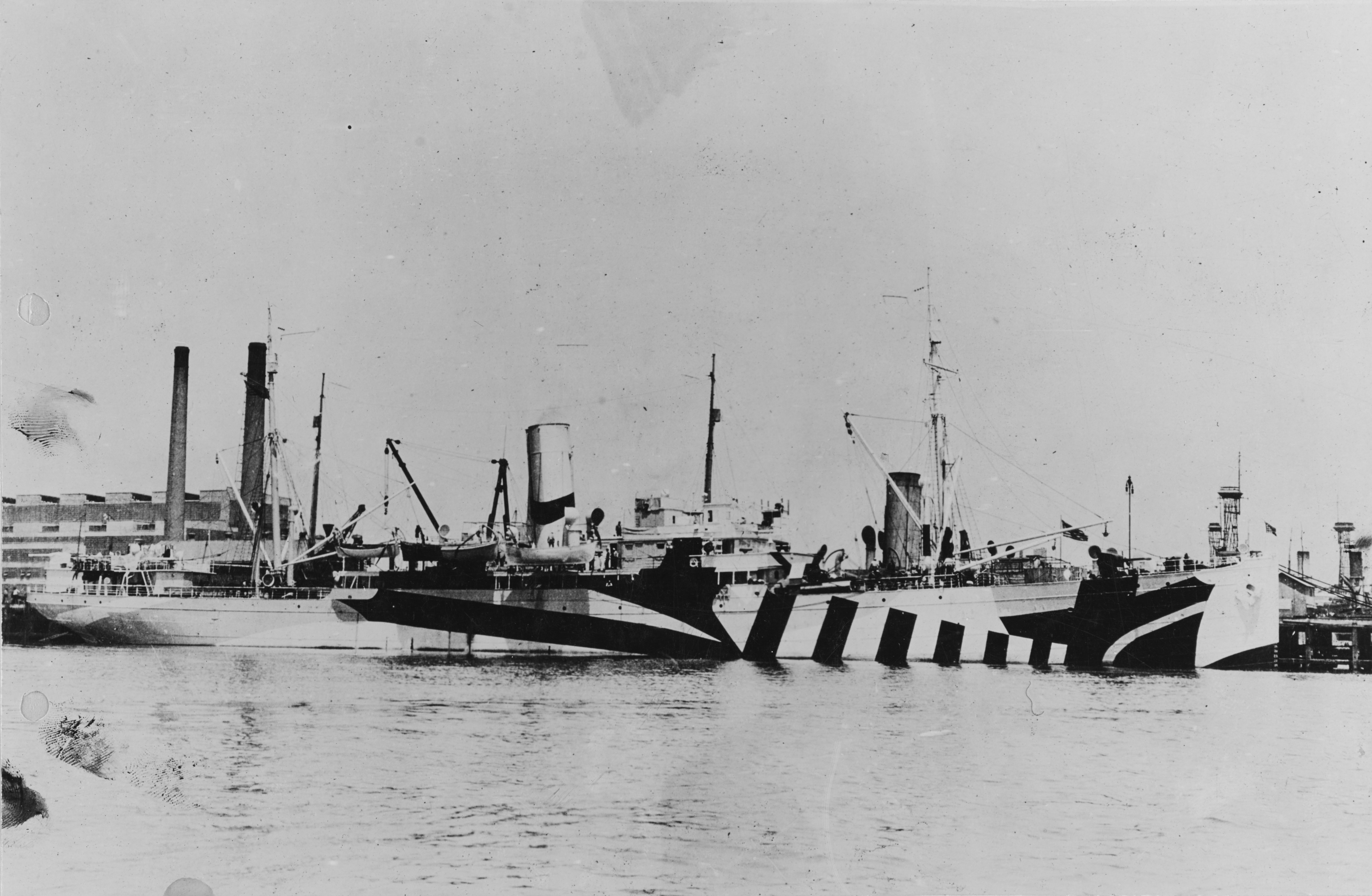
USS Newport News in dazzle camouflage in Philadelphia Navy Yard in June 1918

On 14 May the US Navy took over Odenwald under Executive Order 2619-A. She was defensively armed with four 3-inch/23-caliber guns, and on 14 July she was commissioned into the Navy as USS Newport News, with the hull classification symbol AK-3. She made transatlantic round trips to Europe. On 9 January 1918 she was assigned to the Naval Overseas Transport Service (NOTS), with whom she continued her transatlantic service. On 2 February 1918 she reached Hampton Roads from Europe. She then took coal to Boston, and on 24 March left New York carrying military supplies to the United Kingdom. She discharged her cargo in Liverpool, Dublin, and Queenstown (now Cobh), left Ireland on 18 May, and reached Philadelphia on 31 May.

By 1918 Newport News was equipped with wireless telegraphy. Her call sign was listed as DQS, which was a German call sign.

Newport News made three more transatlantic round trips carrying mixed cargo for the NOTS. The last was in April 1919. It took her to Gibraltar, where after discharging her cargo she loaded food, clothing and other supplies that she took to Constantinople (now Istanbul) to relieve famine in the Near East. She returned via Gibraltar, reached Norfolk, Virginia on 27 June, and was detached from the NOTS.

Newport News’ crew was authorized the World War I Victory Medal, with Transport clasp.

By 1 July 1919 the United States Shipping Board was Newport News' registered owner. Her US official number was 215052, she was registered in New York, and her code letters were LHCP. She left Hampton Roads on 27 July 1919, passed through the Panama Canal to the Pacific, and reached Mare Island Naval Shipyard in California on 5 August. From there she was employed on supply runs, primarily to the Far East. On 1 August 1924 she was decommissioned at Puget Sound Navy Yard, Washington, and struck from the Naval Vessel Register.

== Arctic ==
On 4 April 1925 Newport News was sold for scrap to John F Blaine of Berkeley, California. However, on 10 November the Alaska Packers' Association bought her, renamed her Arctic, and registered her in San Francisco. By 1934 her wireless call sign was WQCM, and this had superseded her code letters. She was scrapped in Japan in January 1937.

== Bibliography ==
- Haws, Duncan (1980). The Ships of the Hamburg America, Adler and Carr Lines. Merchant Fleets in Profile. Vol. 4. Cambridge: Patrick Stephens Ltd. ISBN 0-85059-397-2.
- Lloyd's Register of British and Foreign Shipping. Vol. I.–Steamers. London: Lloyd's Register of Shipping. 1904 – via Internet Archive.
- Lloyd's Register of British and Foreign Shipping. Vol. I.–Steamers. London: Lloyd's Register of Shipping. 1905 – via Internet Archive.
- Lloyd's Register of British and Foreign Shipping. Vol. I.–Steamers. London: Lloyd's Register of Shipping. 1908 – via Internet Archive.
- Lloyd's Register of Shipping. Vol. II.–Steamers. London: Lloyd's Register of Shipping. 1919 – via Internet Archive.
- Lloyd's Register of Shipping. Vol. II.–Steamers and Motorships. London: Lloyd's Register of Shipping. 1926 – via Internet Archive.
- Lloyd's Register of Shipping (PDF). Vol. II.–Steamers and Motorships of 300 tons gross and over. London: Lloyd's Register of Shipping. 1934 – via Southampton City Council.
- The Marconi Press Agency Ltd (1918). The Year Book of Wireless Telegraphy and Telephony. London: The Wireless Press, Ltd.
