= Donald B. Duncan =

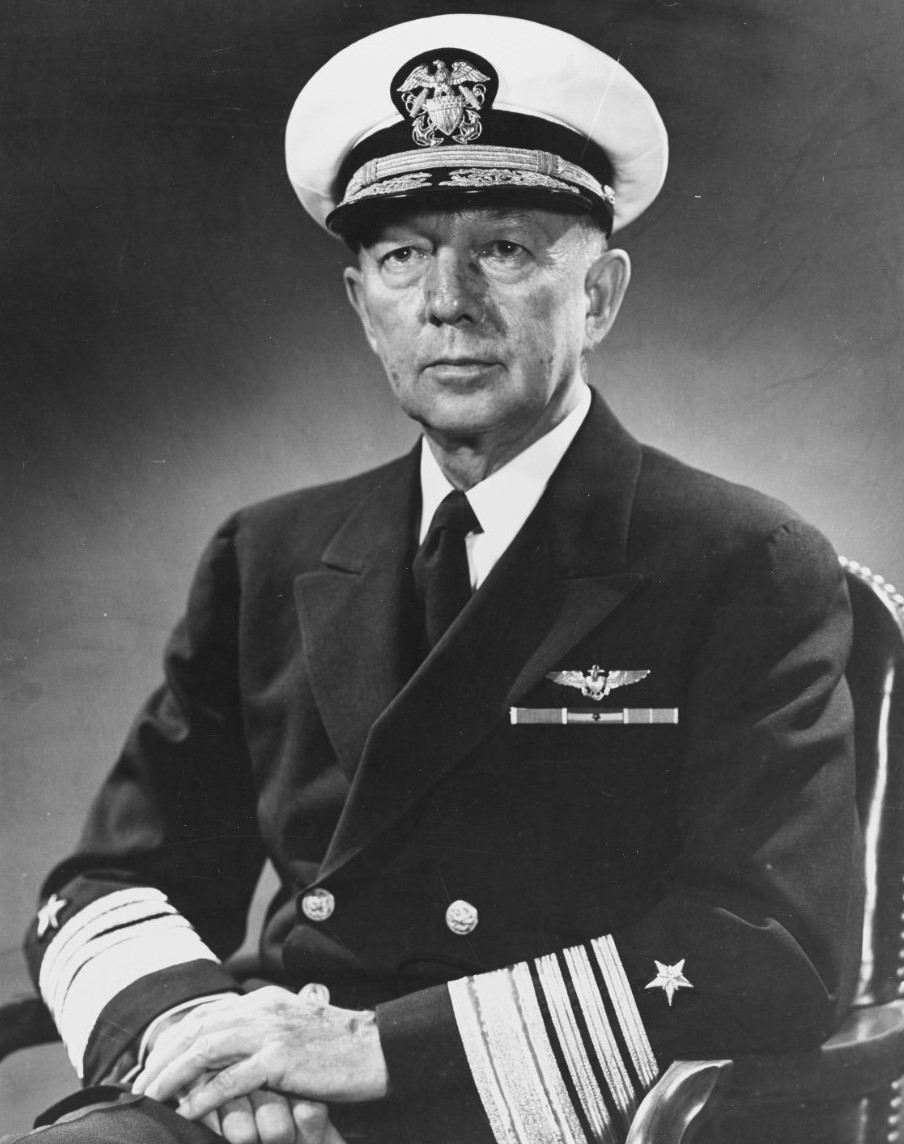
- Born: September 1, 1896; Alpena, Michigan, US
- Died: September 8, 1975 (aged 79); Pensacola, Florida, US
- Military career
- Branch: United States Navy
- Service years: 1917–1956
- Rank: Admiral
- Nickname: "Woo"
- Commands: 2nd Task Fleet; USS Long Island; USS Essex
- Conflicts: World War II
- Awards: Legion of Merit

Donald Bradley Duncan (1896–1975) was an admiral in the United States Navy, who played an important role in aircraft-carrier operations during World War II.

Duncan graduated from the United States Naval Academy in 1917, and was assigned to the USS Oklahoma (BB-37). He received a master's degree in radio engineering from Harvard University in 1925.

In July 1935, Duncan assumed command of Scouting Squadron 3B (VS-3B) assigned to USS Lexington (CV-2).

In 1941, he was the first commander of the USS Long Island, the Navy's first escort aircraft carrier.

As the air operations officer to Admiral Ernest J. King, Duncan assisted with the planning for the Doolittle Raid, and was the one who proposed the use of both the North American B-25 Mitchell bombers and the Hornet (CV-8) for the raid.

He was then appointed to be the first commanding officer of the carrier Essex (CV-9).

Duncan held several important staff and operational positions following the war. He served as Deputy Chief of Naval Operations (Air) from March 6, 1947, to January 20, 1948. He commanded the 2nd Task Fleet after 1948, and was the Vice Chief of Naval Operations from 1951 to 1956.

Following his retirement from the navy on March 1, 1957, he served as Governor of the Naval Home until May 1962. He died on September 8, 1975.

== Awards ==
- Naval Aviator insignia
- Legion of Merit
- Navy Presidential Unit Citation with one bronze service star
- National Defense Service Medal
- Order of the British Empire, Military Division

== See also ==
- History of the United States Navy
