= USS Horne =

1964 Belknap-class cruiser

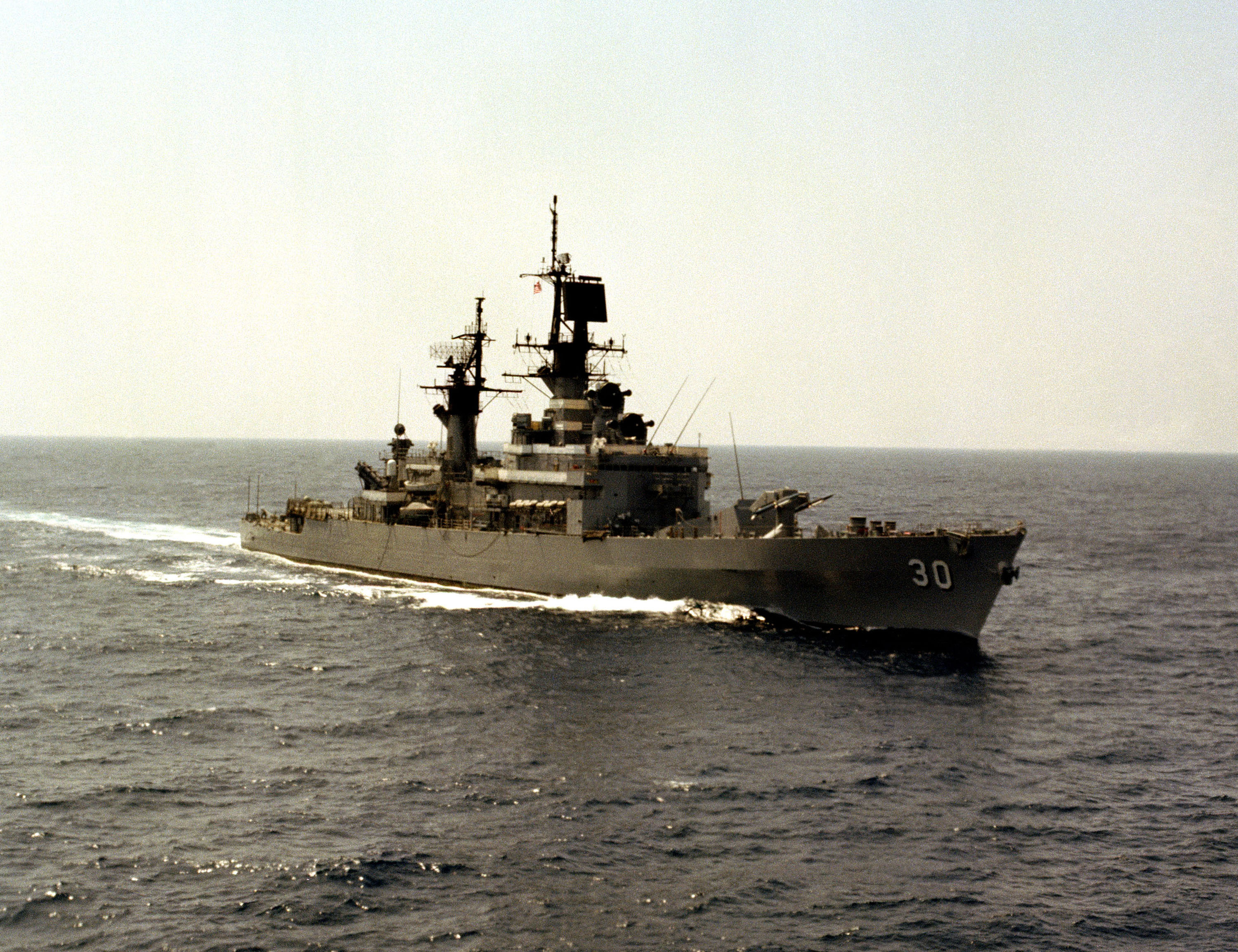
- USS Horne (CG-30)

History

United States
- Name: Horne
- Namesake: Frederick J. Horne
- Ordered: 20 September 1961
- Builder: San Francisco Naval Shipyard
- Laid down: 12 December 1962
- Launched: 30 October 1964
- Acquired: 7 July 1967
- Commissioned: 15 April 1967
- Decommissioned: 4 February 1994
- Reclassified: CG-30 on 30 June 1975
- Stricken: 4 February 1994
- Home port: NS San Diego, California (former)
- Motto: Audace Toujours L'Audace (Audacity, Always Audacity)
- Fate: Sunk as target 14 July 2008
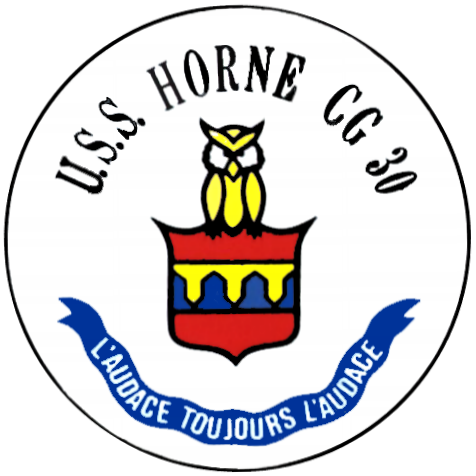
- Badge

General characteristics
- Class & type: Belknap-class cruiser
- Displacement: 7930 tons
- Length: 547 ft (167 m)
- Beam: 55 ft (17 m)
- Draught: 28 ft 10 in (8.79 m)
- Speed: 30 knots
- Complement: 418 Officer and Enlisted
- Sensors & processing systems: AN/SPS-48E air-search radar; AN/SPS-49(V)5 air-search radar; AN/SPG-55B fire-control radar; AN/SPG-53F gun fire-control radar; AN/SQS-26 sonar
- Electronic warfare & decoys: AN/SLQ-32
- Armament: one Mark 42 five-inch / 54-caliber gun, two three-inch guns, one Terrier missile/SM-2ER launcher, six 15.5-inch torpedo tubes, Harpoon missiles, Phalanx CIWS

USS Horne (DLG/CG-30) was a Belknap-class destroyer leader/cruiser, named for Admiral Frederick J. Horne, 1880–1959. She was launched as DLG-30, a destroyer, and reclassified a cruiser on 30 June 1975.

The contract to construct Horne was awarded on 20 September 1961. Her keel was laid down at San Francisco Naval Shipyard on 12 December 1962. She was launched 30 October 1964 and sponsored by Mrs. Frederick Horne, widow of Admiral Horne. She was delivered 7 July 1967 and commissioned on 15 April 1967.

== History ==
=== 1983 deployment ===
On 20 July 1983 The New York Times reported that Horne, along with seven other vessels in the Ranger Carrier Battle Group, left San Diego on Friday 15 July 1983 and were headed for the western Pacific when they were rerouted and ordered to steam for Central America to conduct training and flight operations in areas off the coasts of Nicaragua, El Salvador and Honduras as part of major military exercises planned for that summer.

=== 1994 decommissioned ===
After more than 26 years of service, Horne was decommissioned on 4 February 1994. She was struck from the register the same day, placed in the custody of the United States Maritime Administration and was laid up at the Suisun Bay National Defense Reserve Fleet. Initially scheduled to be scrapped, she was spared the breakers torch and was sunk as a target on 29 June 2008 as part of RIMPAC 2008.

== Unit awards ==
The USS Horne (CG-30) and its crewmembers have received the following awards :

	2 Combat Action Ribbons
Joint Meritorious Unit Award	1 Joint Meritorious Unit Award
Navy Unit Commendation	1 Navy Unit Commendation
Navy Meritorious Unit Commendation	1 Meritorious Unit Commendation
Navy Expeditionary Medal	1 Navy Expeditionary Medal
	2 National Defense Medals
	2 Armed Forces Expeditionary Medals
	Vietnam Service Medal with eight campaign stars Vietnam Campaign Medal
	Southwest Asia Service Medal with one campaign star
	8 Sea Service Deployment Ribbons
	Republic of Vietnam Gallantry Cross
Kuwait Liberation Medal (Saudi Arabia)	1 Kuwait Liberation Medal (Saudi Arabia)
Kuwait Liberation Medal	1 Kuwait Liberation Medal
