= USS Newport News =

USS Newport News may refer to the following ships operated by the United States Navy:

- USS Newport News (AK-3), was a German cargo ship named Odenwald, taken over by the US Navy during World War I
- USS Newport News (CA-148), was a Des Moines-class heavy cruiser in service from 1948 to 1978
- USS Newport News (SSN-750), is a Los Angeles-class submarine commissioned in 1989 and currently in active service
