= West Indian Company =

Company in the United States Virgin Islands

The West Indian Company, Limited (WICO) is a formerly private company in the United States Virgin Islands, now owned by the Public Finance Authority of the U.S.V.I. It was founded in 1912 in Denmark, and operated for most of its history as a subsidiary of the East Asiatic Company. It was sold in 1993 to the government of the U.S.V.I. Originally designed to manage coal bunkering, the company brought electricity services to the island in 1914. In 1936, the original president, Mr. Hans N. Andersen of Denmark, saw tourism as another business venture and established the Maison Danois, the first tourist shop in St. Thomas. That year, the company also bought property and began development of what they would call Caneel Bay.

WICO is now wholly owned by the Public Finance Authority, an entity within the executive branch of the V.I. government. It is a public entity operating on behalf of the Government,’ Act No. 5826, 8 (b). WICO hosts a busy duty-free port shopping mall, Havensight Mall in the Charlotte Amalie Harbor on St. Thomas, and has berths on the Long Wharf cruise ship dock to serve cruise passengers. The mall has numerous tenants and services, including medical, business services, gifts and souvenirs, jewelry, restaurants, apparel, sports, and car rental.
