= Edward C. Kalbfus =

United States Navy admiral (1877–1954)

Edward Clifford Kalbfus
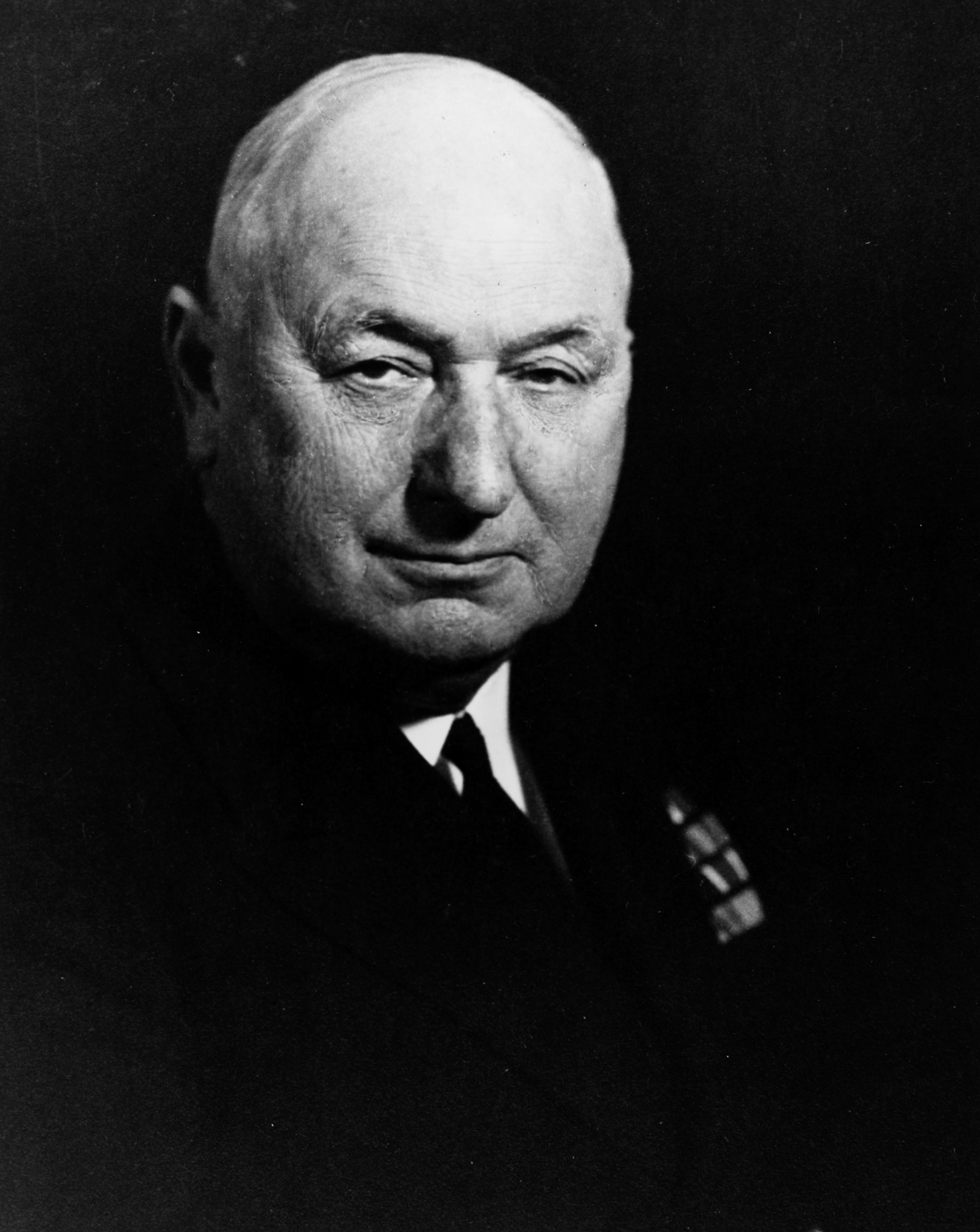
- Kalbfus in 1943
- Born: November 24, 1877; Mauch Chunk, Pennsylvania, U.S.
- Died: September 6, 1954 (aged 76); Newport, Rhode Island, U.S.
- Burial place: Arlington National Cemetery
- Military career
- Allegiance: United States of America
- Branch: United States Navy
- Service years: 1899–1946
- Rank: Admiral
- Nicknames: Old Dutch; Old Man
- Commands: Battle Force; President; Naval War College; USS California (BB-44); USS Trenton (CL-11); USS Iowa (BB-4); USS Pocahontas (ID-3044)
- Conflicts: Spanish–American War; Philippine–American War; Occupation of Veracruz; World War I; World War II
- Awards: Navy Cross; Legion of Merit

Edward Clifford Kalbfus (November 24, 1877 – September 6, 1954), nicknamed "Old Dutch", was a four-star admiral in the United States Navy who was commander of the Battle Force of the United States Fleet from 1938 to 1939 and President of the Naval War College from 1934 to 1936 and 1939 to 1942.

== Early life and education ==
Kalbfus was born in Mauch Chunk, Pennsylvania in present-day Jim Thorpe, Pennsylvania, to the former Mary Electra Jones and Dr. Joseph Kalbfus, a nationally acclaimed wildlife conservationist who served as chief game protector of the state of Pennsylvania and executive secretary of the Pennsylvania State Game Commission.

He attended Selwyn Hall in Reading, Pennsylvania before securing an appointment to the United States Naval Academy in Annapolis, Maryland. As a midshipman at the Naval Academy, he played football and was captain of the baseball team during his first class year, and trained afloat during the summers aboard the Naval Academy Practice Ship Monongahela in 1895, 1896, and 1897. In the summer of 1898, during the Spanish–American War, he served aboard the battleship Oregon, witnessing the sinking of the Spanish cruiser Reina Mercedes and the Battle of Santiago Bay. Later that summer he participated in the blockade of Cuba aboard the steam yacht Wasp, the screw sloop Lancaster, and the gunboat Newport. After a final training cruise aboard the battleship Indiana, he graduated from the Naval Academy in 1899 and commenced the required two years of precommissioning sea duty as a passed midshipman.

== Career ==
=== United States Navy ===
Voyaging to the Philippine Islands aboard the collier USS Scindia, he participated in the Philippine Insurrection in 1900 and 1901 aboard the gunboat Petrel and the cargo ship General Alava He received his ensign's commission on July 27, 1901.

In November 1902, he reported aboard the protected cruiser Cincinnati, which was then operating in the Caribbean Sea, but soon found himself back in the Philippines when Cincinnati was assigned to the Asiatic Station the next year. In April 1904 he returned to the United States aboard the protected cruiser Albany, reporting in September to the Naval Academy, where he spent two years as an instructor in the Department of Marine Engineering and Naval Construction and as senior engineering officer of the training ship Newark during the annual midshipman cruises. After the 1906 training cruise he remained aboard Newark when it sailed to participate in the imposition of American military rule in Cuba following the resignation of President Tomás Estrada Palma.

In November 1906, he was assigned as senior engineering officer aboard the new battleship Kansas prior to its commissioning at Philadelphia Navy Yard on April 18, 1907. Kansas conducted shakedown training near Provincetown, Massachusetts later that year, before joining the Great White Fleet at Hampton Roads, Virginia in December. Kalbfus served as the battleship's gunnery officer while it participated in the Great White Fleet's historic round-the-world cruise. Kansas returned with the fleet to Hampton Roads in February 1909 and Kalbfus went ashore in May 1910 to begin a three-year tour at the Bureau of Navigation.

He returned to sea in November 1913, reporting first aboard the battleship Arkansas, then as fleet engineer and aide to the commander in chief of the U.S. Atlantic Fleet, and finally as navigator of the battleship Wyoming. During this period he took charge of the Mexican railway system during the Atlantic Fleet's occupation of Veracruz. He reported to the Navy Department in 1915 as assistant director of gunnery exercises and engineering competitions. In 1917 he was a member of the Board of Appraisal of merchant and private vessels in New York.

==== World War I ====
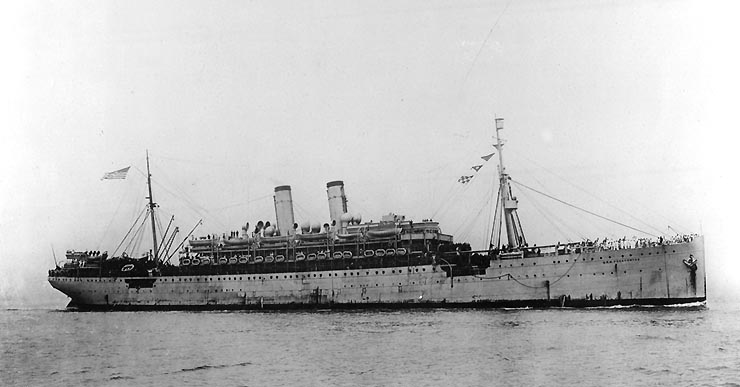
USS Pocahontas

During World War I, Kalbfus, then a captain, received his first command, the transport ship Pocahontas, which ferried troops to Europe as part of the Cruiser and Transport Force under Rear Admiral Albert Gleaves. On May 2, 1918, Pocahontas was attacked by a German submarine that bombarded her with 5.9-inch (150 mm) shells. The ship was not directly hit and suffered no casualties. Kalbfus ordered return fire, but the submarine was outside the range of Pocahontas' guns, so the transport set an evasive zig-zag course, then fled at full speed, setting a record 16.2 knots (30.0 km/h) that allowed Pocahontas to outrun the submarine twenty minutes after the attack began.

For saving the ship Kalbfus was awarded the Navy Cross. The citation commended his "distinguished service in the line of his profession as commanding officer of the U.S.S. Pocahontas, engaged in the important, exacting and hazardous duty of' transporting and escorting troops and supplies to European ports through waters infested with enemy submarines and mines."

He commanded the battleship Iowa from 1918 to 1919, then joined the staff of Commander Destroyers, Atlantic from 1919 to 1921, where he ran the Destroyer Engineering School as chief of engineering at the Charleston Navy Yard. "He was a fine officer and ran an excellent school in Charleston, teaching junior officers how to take care of the engineering plants on destroyers," recalled Lieutenant Jerauld Wright. "[The distilling equipment] required continuous maintenance, so he got the manufacturers down to the school to teach us what to do."

== Post-war ==
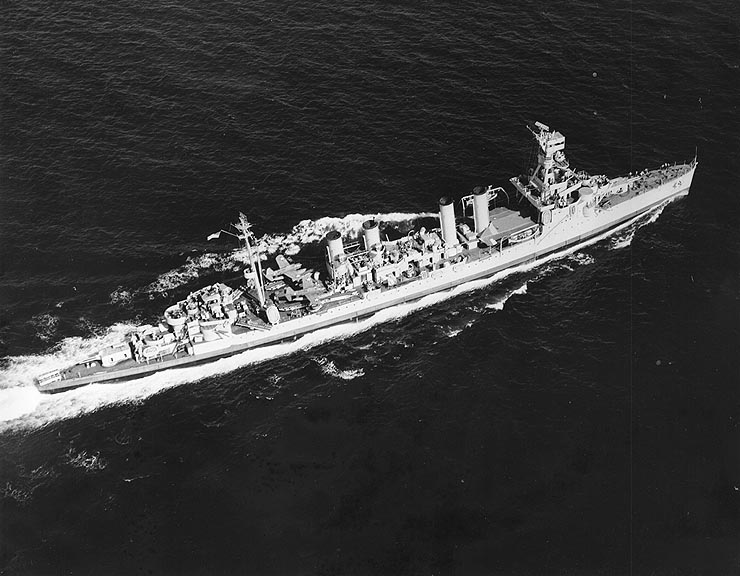
USS Trenton

After the war, he was department head of the Fleet Maintenance Division in the office of the chief of naval operations from 1921 to 1924.

He was captain of the new light cruiser Trenton from its commissioning on April 19, 1924. Trenton departed from New York Harbor on May 24 for a shakedown cruise in the Mediterranean Sea, returning to the Washington Navy Yard on September 29. In mid-October, during gunnery drills in the Norfolk area, a powder explosion in the forward turret killed or injured every member of the gun crew. Two of Trenton's crew, Ensign Henry Clay Drexler and Boatswain's Mate First Class George Cholister, were posthumously awarded the Medal of Honor for their unsuccessful efforts to prevent additional powder charges from detonating.

From 1926 to 1927, Kalbfus attended the junior course at the Naval War College in Newport, Rhode Island, beginning a long association with that institution. He was a standout student in the memory of the course director: "I remember particularly the research done and the presentation of the Pacific problem by (then) Captain Kalbfus, conclusions that were of inestimable value to those who later had to conduct the War in the Pacific." After graduating from the junior course, he remained at the Naval War College as a member of its staff for two years, first as head of the logistics department, then as head of the intelligence department. He left the Naval War College in 1929 to serve as captain of the battleship California.

== Flag officer ==
Promoted to rear admiral, he was assigned as chief of staff to Commander Battleships, Battle Fleet in 1930, then went ashore as director of war plans in the Navy Department for six months in 1931 before returning to sea as Commander Destroyers, Battle Force, United States Fleet from 1931 to 1934.

=== Naval War College president (first term) ===
On June 18, 1934, Kalbfus began the first of two non-consecutive terms as president of the Naval War College. During his first term, Kalbfus devoted his energy to writing a treatise on naval planning that would eventually be regarded as the ultimate expression of Naval War College philosophy during the interwar period.

Dissatisfied with the existing guide to naval planning, Kalbfus decided to replace it by writing a book-length treatment of the precepts of logical thinking that could be applied to every military situation. In Kalbfus' formulation, naval planning should be guided by "the fundamental principle for the attainment of an end," a three-part formula that evaluated the suitability, feasibility, and acceptability of a plan by asking whether the proposed course of action would accomplish the mission, whether the mission could be accomplished using the available resources, and whether the cost would be worth the price.

Kalbfus believed his new book was essential to correct what he viewed as a widespread indifference within the Navy to the fundamentals of naval warfare. According to Kalbfus, "At the time... it was not generally accepted by the Navy that their business was to fight although, of course, if confronted with this question, they would have agreed that that is what they were hired for. But, within the range of my own observation, both ashore and afloat, I saw that the keeping of office hours and the performance of sundry routine tasks were more in order than an intensive study of the Navy's real business."

Kalbfus completed his first draft in May 1936 and circulated it among staff and students for review. Many staff members were dissatisfied with the new text, including Captain Raymond A. Spruance, who objected to Kalbfus' rejection of existing doctrine and to his cumbersome writing style. Ordered to keep his criticisms to himself, Spruance instead presented them directly to Kalbfus, who overruled the demands of Spruance's outraged superior that Spruance be punished for insubordination.

After assimilating all of the comments, Kalbfus submitted the book for publication under the title Sound Military Decision, before departing the college on December 15, 1936 to assume a fleet command. His successor, Rear Admiral Charles P. Snyder, spent a year reviewing the manuscript, then rewrote several chapters for clarity and published this revised edition in May 1938. Outraged at Snyder's tampering, Kalbfus was persuaded by his chief of staff to avoid a public confrontation, but when it became clear that he would not be appointed to a higher position following his tour in the fleet, Kalbfus requested a return to the Naval War College in order to finish the book himself.

Kalbfus published his version of Sound Military Decision in March 1942. It received wide distribution within the wartime Navy as the only naval planning guide then in print. In 1944, Admiral Ernest J. King enshrined its methodology in naval regulations as COMINCH P-1: "Naval Directives and the Order Form," although it fell from favor after the war. In 1984, the official historians of the Naval War College would write, "Many believe it was and still is the most valuable contribution to military thought made at the Naval War College in the past century...Kalbfus' Sound Military Decision was the most important expression of the college's philosophy, embodying both the focus and understanding expressed in college classrooms throughout the interwar period."

=== Commander Battleships, Battle Force ===
On January 2, 1937, he was advanced to the temporary rank of vice admiral as Commander Battleships, Battle Force, United States Fleet (COMBATSHIPS). Later that year, during a casual encounter at a cocktail party in San Diego, California, Kalbfus showed a Life magazine article about inventor Donald Roebling's Alligator amphibious rescue vehicle to Major General Louis McCarty Little, commanding general of the Fleet Marine Force. Impressed, Little forwarded the article to Marine Corps Commandant Thomas Holcomb, initiating a chain of events that resulted in the development of the first amtrac, the amphibious landing craft that would be used to land Marines on Guadalcanal and other Pacific islands during World War II.

=== Commander Battle Force ===
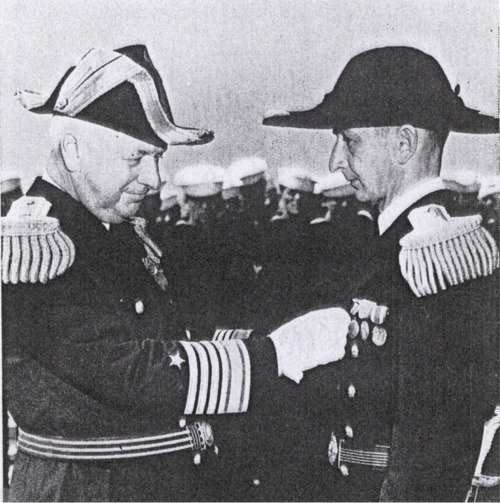
Kalbfus as commander of Battle Force (left), awarding the Navy Cross to Lieutenant Arthur F. Anders, August 1938

Kalbfus was promoted to admiral upon relieving Admiral Claude C. Bloch as Commander Battle Force, United States Fleet (COMBATFOR) on January 29, 1938. When assigned to command the Battle Force, he was the second youngest full admiral in the Navy at age 60.

Among his top subordinates was Vice Admiral Ernest J. King, a former Cincinnati shipmate and longtime friend who was Commander Aircraft, Battle Force. Since Kalbfus had spent his career in surface ships and knew nothing about naval aviation, he allowed King to do as he pleased. Kalbfus told his staff, "I won't have to worry about the aircraft of this force as long as Ernie King is down in San Diego."

In 1938, Kalbfus commanded the attacking "Black Fleet" in Fleet Problem XIX, the annual fleet maneuvers that were being staged in the Pacific that year. Contrary to existing doctrine, Kalbfus allowed King's aircraft carriers to operate independently from the battle line, saying, "Give Ernie King plenty to do during the exercises." King used the opportunity to launch a successful air attack on Pearl Harbor. Several weeks later, King repeated the feat by attacking Mare Island Naval Shipyard.

A year later, Fleet Problem XX tested the defense of the Panama Canal with an elaborate three-week simulated battle in the South Atlantic and Caribbean beginning in February 1939. The exercise was described at the time as the most elaborate naval operations ever staged in American waters. Kalbfus commanded the attacking "White Force," opposing the defending "Black Force" commanded by Vice Admiral Adolphus Andrews of the Scouting Force. During the maneuvers, Kalbfus demonstrated little appreciation for the potential of the aircraft carrier as an offensive weapon. In the first mock battle, he tried to use the carriers as bait to lure the enemy cruisers within range of his battleships. When that failed, he dispatched Rear Admiral William F. Halsey to locate the enemy with two carriers. Instead, Halsey sank the enemy cruisers from the air before Kalbfus' battleships could steam into range. The exercise concluded with a surface action. Anticipating the conclusion of his tenure with the Battle Force, Kalbfus lobbied President Franklin D. Roosevelt, with endorsements added by the Chief of Naval Operations William D. Leahy, for Kalbfus to receive second assignment to serve as President of the Naval War College during deliberations involving the assignments of several key commanders on board the Houston. At that time, Kalbfus convinced Roosevelt about persistent problems of battle doctrine, which required an update to the text of Sound Military Decision which Kalbfus subsequently updated. The revised edition featured as a reference penned by Kalbfus in Life Magazine and later appeared in published form as promulgated in 1942.

Kalbfus relinquished command of the Battle Force to Admiral James O. Richardson on June 24, 1939, and reverted to his permanent rank of rear admiral. President Roosevelt ranked Kalbfus first of three potential candidates to succeed Richardson as chief of the Bureau of Navigation, but ultimately accepted Richardson's recommendation of a fourth candidate, Rear Admiral Chester W. Nimitz. Regarding Kalbfus, Roosevelt mused, "Well, what then will we do with 'Old Dutch' – I suppose we can send him to the Naval War College?"

== World War II ==
=== President, Naval War College (second term) ===
Having served in four-star rank as Commander of the Battle Force, Kalbfus reported for a second tour in two-star rank as President of the Naval War College on June 30, 1939. His status as a former Battle Force commander reflected the role of the Naval War College in anticipation of American involvement in World War II. In September 1939, the General Board of the Navy provided a series of mobilization recommendations in anticipation of American involvement in the European war. The ongoing conflict in Asia provided additional impetus for the Bureau of Navigation to request a war contingency plan from the President of the Naval War College. The Chief of the Bureau of Navigation, Rear Admiral Chester W. Nimitz anticipated the wartime personnel shortfalls inherent with the potential declaration of war, thus inspiring his request to Kalbfus for assistance in examining the future requirements for maintaining the functions of the Naval War College.

Under peacetime reorganizations of the Navy Department under General Order 143, along with the reestablishment of the Atlantic Fleet under the four-star flag of Admiral Ernest J. King, Kalbfus continued as President of the Naval War College upon formally accepting additional duty the senior flag officer present to coordinate all naval activities in the Narragansett Bay area. "Even though his duties as Commandant of the Naval Base may occupy most, if not all of his time during war, his office as President, Naval War College, will remain alive and the college will continue as an entity." Naval Operating Base, Newport was created on March 31, 1941, and Kalbfus became base commandant on April 2. As Commander, Naval Operating Base, Newport, he supervised the Naval Training Center; Naval Net Depot; Naval Air Station, Quonset Point; Naval Torpedo Station; Naval Fuel Depot, Melville; and the Naval Hospital. The new naval base cost $100,000,000 to establish and covered 2,200 acres (8.9 km^{2}) of shoreline.

Within the broader context of American defensive planning for wartime contingencies, the Chief of Naval Operations, Admiral Harold R. Stark, directed the Naval War College to coordinate with the Navy General Board in organizing the fleet mobilization plan in conjunction with the Rainbow Plans. On the General Board, Rear Admiral Ernest J. King refuted proposals from the Chief of the Bureau of Navigation, Rear Admiral Chester W. Nimitz, to designate the Naval War College as a satellite to the Operational Planning OPNAV staff of the Navy Department in the event of a war.

Kalbfus collaborated with King and the General Board to influence Stark's directives concerning the wartime functions of the Naval War College. Despite Bureau of Navigation efforts to reduce personnel assigned to the Naval War College, Kalbfus successfully influenced Stark to designate the Naval War College as a strategic forum to assist the Offices of Naval Intelligence and Communications in efforts to rewrite the existing Joint Army-Navy concepts for future operations. The Director of War Plans, Captain Robert Ghormley and his successor Richmond Kelly Turner subsequently worked with the Navy General Board and the Naval War College to revise the plans. Coincident with these developments, retired Captain Dudley W. Knox influenced the collateral duty appointment of Kalbfus to hold the functions of Director of Naval History from 1939.

As President of the Naval War College, Kalbfus also worked with Knox to synthesize the Historical Section functions of the Naval War College with those under Knox at the Office of Naval Intelligence. At the request of Stark and King in the immediate aftermath of the sinking of the USS Reuben James, Kalbfus remained on duty upon his administrative transfer to retired status on 1 December 1941. At that time, Kalbfus also remained in place as President of the Naval War College with continued administrative responsibility to the Chief of Naval Operations, Stark, and operationally within the context of the shore establishment supporting the Atlantic Fleet, King. Kalbfus organized the Naval War College to inform the operational plans, as implemented by the seagoing fleet headquarters staffs in the Asiatic, Pacific, and Atlantic. For this purpose, Kalbfus established a global tracking organization within the Communications Annex Building of the Naval War College. Having previously visited the British cryptographic facilities on the grounds of Bletchley Park, Western Approaches, and the Operational Intelligence Centre in London, Lieutenant Robert Weeks served as King's communications and intelligence officer while assigned from the Atlantic Fleet staff to organize the tracking organization in the Communications Annex of the Naval War College during the summer of 1941.

Under the collaborative arrangements between King and Kalbfus in efforts to synthesize Atlantic Fleet operations with intelligence, the Naval War College provided the venue ashore which enabled Weeks to establish a key communications link with the equivalent tracking activities on the Chief of Naval Operations and War Plans Division staffs within the Navy Department. With the establishment of Sea Frontier Headquarters in conjunction with joint Army-Navy reorganization efforts, Kalbfus carried the multiple functions of President of the Naval War College. The formal establishment of the Joint Chiefs of Staff by February 1942 further amplified the role of the Naval War College in organizing global U.S. Naval efforts under the Chief of Naval Operations and Commander in Chief, U.S. Fleet, both of which fused under the overall authority of Admiral Ernest J. King by Executive Order 9096 in March 1942.

Thereafter, Kalbfus carried collateral responsibility to the Chief of Naval Operations and the Directors of Naval Intelligence and War Plans as Director of Naval History. Wartime conditions following the surprise attacks at Pearl Harbor created the mandate for Kalbfus to remain on active service on retired status in his multifaceted assignment as President of the Naval War College. By 1942, the administrative basis for what formally evolved as the Office of Naval History matured under Kalbfus during his second tenure in Newport. In June 1942, at the recommendation of the Chief of Naval Operations, Admiral Ernest J. King, Kalbfus again broke his four-star flag as President of the Naval War College. He remained based in Newport upon his subsequent relief as President of the Naval War College, Vice Admiral William S. Pye on November 2, 1942. in November. Kalbfus and Pye continued working with retired Captain Dudley W. Knox to synthesize strategic analysis by fusing the operational intelligence and historical analysis functions of the Naval War College with those of the OPNAV staff.

=== General Board ===
Having been relieved by Pye as President of the Naval War College, Kalbfus continued in retired status as a member of the General Board of the Navy, a small panel of senior advisors to the Secretary of the Navy. In this capacity, he addressed the Congress of the Daughters of the American Revolution on April 20, 1943, where he declared that Japan and Germany must be restrained by force from future surprise attacks. "We must not let this happen again – Japan has repeatedly attacked nations without warning and against international law, and Germany has done it, too. When I am retired from the Navy I shall spend the rest of my days trying to teach the American people that their faith in humanity and high ethical standards are not enough, unless backed up with force."

He was appointed the first Director of Naval History, although he was unable to devote much time to his new duties at first because he was immediately named to the board empaneled to investigate the Pearl Harbor disaster. He retired from the Navy after the end of the war. By 1944, upon receiving the formal designation under the authority of the Secretary of the Navy, Kalbfus formally reported as Director of Naval History on July 12, 1944. With the formal establishment of the Office of Naval History on that date, Kalbfus carried the wartime authorities to act with coequal directorial responsibility with those of the Offices of Naval Intelligence and Communications on the Naval Planning staff, all under the immediate responsibility to the Chief of Naval Operations, Admiral Ernest J. King.

The coequal operational responsibility of King as Commander in Chief, U.S. Fleet further empowered Kalbfus to unify the preexisting functions of the Historical Sections of the Naval War College and Office of Naval Intelligence. To this end, Kalbfus designated retired Captain Dudley W. Knox as his deputy from within the Navy Department.

=== Office of Naval History ===
King synthesized historical analysis with intelligence in orchestrating the global war at sea, empowering Kalbfus and Knox to continue efforts with Pye by using the Naval War College as an operational forum wherein the personnel assigned examined combined and joint problems of organization and command. In semi-retired status, Kalbfus also assisted investigatory efforts to derive lessons from the disaster at Pearl Harbor. He also assisted the investigations surrounding the sinking of the USS Indianapolis.

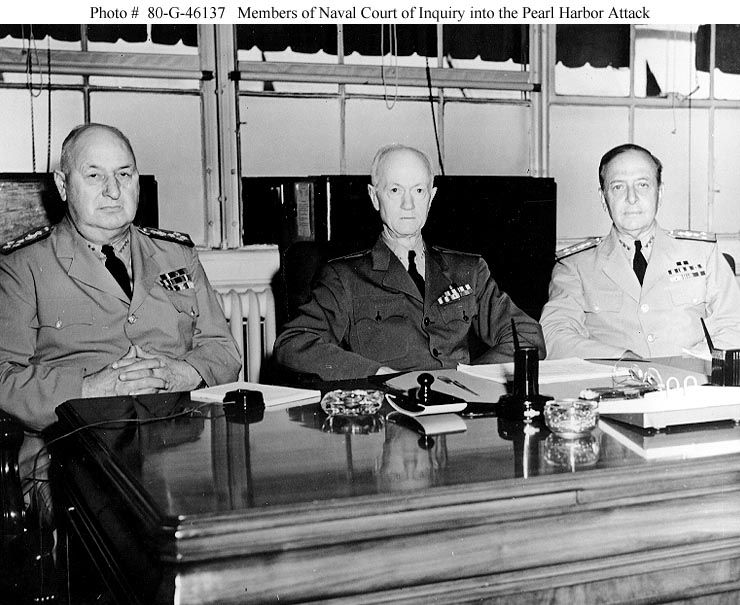
Kalbfus (left) as a member of the Navy Court of Inquiry into the Pearl Harbor Attack in 1944

On July 13, 1944, Secretary of the Navy James V. Forrestal ordered that a Naval Court of Inquiry be convened to investigate the facts surrounding the Japanese attack on Pearl Harbor and to assess any culpability borne by members of the Navy. Kalbfus, Admiral Orin G. Murfin, and Vice Admiral Adolphus Andrews were the three retired flag officers named as members of the court. Vice Admiral Charles Wellborn, Jr. recalled that when appointed, Kalbfus "was commonly regarded as a good solid Naval Officer--not brilliant, but sound."

The court convened on July 24, 1944 and held daily sessions in Washington, D.C., San Francisco, and Pearl Harbor. After interviewing numerous witnesses, it completed its work on October 19, 1944. Its report to the Navy Department largely exonerated Rear Admiral Husband E. Kimmel, commander in chief of the Pacific Fleet at the time of the attack. The court found that Kimmel's decisions had been correct given the limited information available to him, but criticized then-Chief of Naval Operations Harold R. Stark for failing to warn Kimmel that war was imminent. The court concluded that "based upon the facts established, the Court is of the opinion that no offenses have been committed nor serious blame incurred on the part of any person or persons in the naval service." Because the court's findings implicitly revealed that American cryptographers had broken the Japanese codes, a critical wartime secret, the court's report was not made public until after the end of the war.

Upon reviewing the report, Forrestal felt that the court had been too lenient in assigning blame for the disaster. The court had found that the Army and Navy had adequately cooperated in the defense of Pearl Harbor; that there had been no information indicating that Japanese carriers were on their way to attack Pearl Harbor; and that the attack had succeeded principally because of the aerial torpedo, a secret weapon whose use could not have been predicted. Forrestal disapproved all of these findings, judging that Kimmel could have done more with the information he had to prevent or mitigate the attack. Forrestal concluded that both Kimmel and Stark had "failed to demonstrate the superior judgment necessary for exercising command commensurate with their rank and their assigned duties."

== Personal life ==
He married the former Syria Florence Brown, the daughter of naval officer and astronomer Stimson Joseph Brown, on May 13, 1905; they had no children.

Upon his transfer to the retired list, Kalbfus carried on as a four-star advisor reporting to the Secretary of the Navy until 1947. In retirement, Kalbfus resided at his home, Restmere, in Newport, Rhode Island, where he was active in local civic affairs. In 1947, he was appointed by President Harry S. Truman to succeed Pennsylvania Senator David A. Reed as a member of the American Battle Monuments Commission. He remained listed as a four-star in the Naval Register until his death in September 1954. In 1954, Kalbfus died at the Naval Hospital of leukemia at the age of 78 and was buried in Arlington National Cemetery.

The former home of the Kalbfus family, Restmere Mansion, later featured in popular American culture as the chosen residence for the artists who played at the Newport Folk Festival and the home is featured on the sleeve jacket of the associated live album from 1964.

== Decorations and honors ==
His decorations include the Navy Cross, awarded for commanding Pocahontas during World War I; the Legion of Merit, awarded for his World War II service as Commander, Naval Operating Base, Newport; the Sampson Medal; the Spanish Campaign Medal; the Philippine Campaign Medal; the Cuban Pacification Medal; the Mexican Service Medal; the World War I Victory Medal; the American Campaign Medal; the American Defense Medal; the World War II Victory Medal; and the Military Order of Aviz, awarded by the government of Portugal for service in connection with the historic first transatlantic flight made by the Curtiss NC flying boats. The War Department awarded him a special letter of commendation for his World War I service.

Ribbon bar of Admiral Kalbfus:

Admiral Kalbfus Road in Newport, Rhode Island was named in his honor at the end of his second term as president of the Naval War College.

== See also ==
Military offices
Preceded by Luke McNamee	President of the Naval War College; 18 June 1934–15 December 1936	Succeeded by Charles P. Snyder
Preceded by Claude C. Bloch	Commander, Battle Force; 29 January 1938–24 June 1939	Succeeded by James O. Richardson
Preceded by Charles P. Snyder	President of the Naval War College; 30 June 1939–2 November 1942	Succeeded by William S. Pye
