= Colestown Cemetery, Cherry Hill Township =

Cemetery in New Jersey, United States

Coordinates: 39.9334°N 74.9895°W

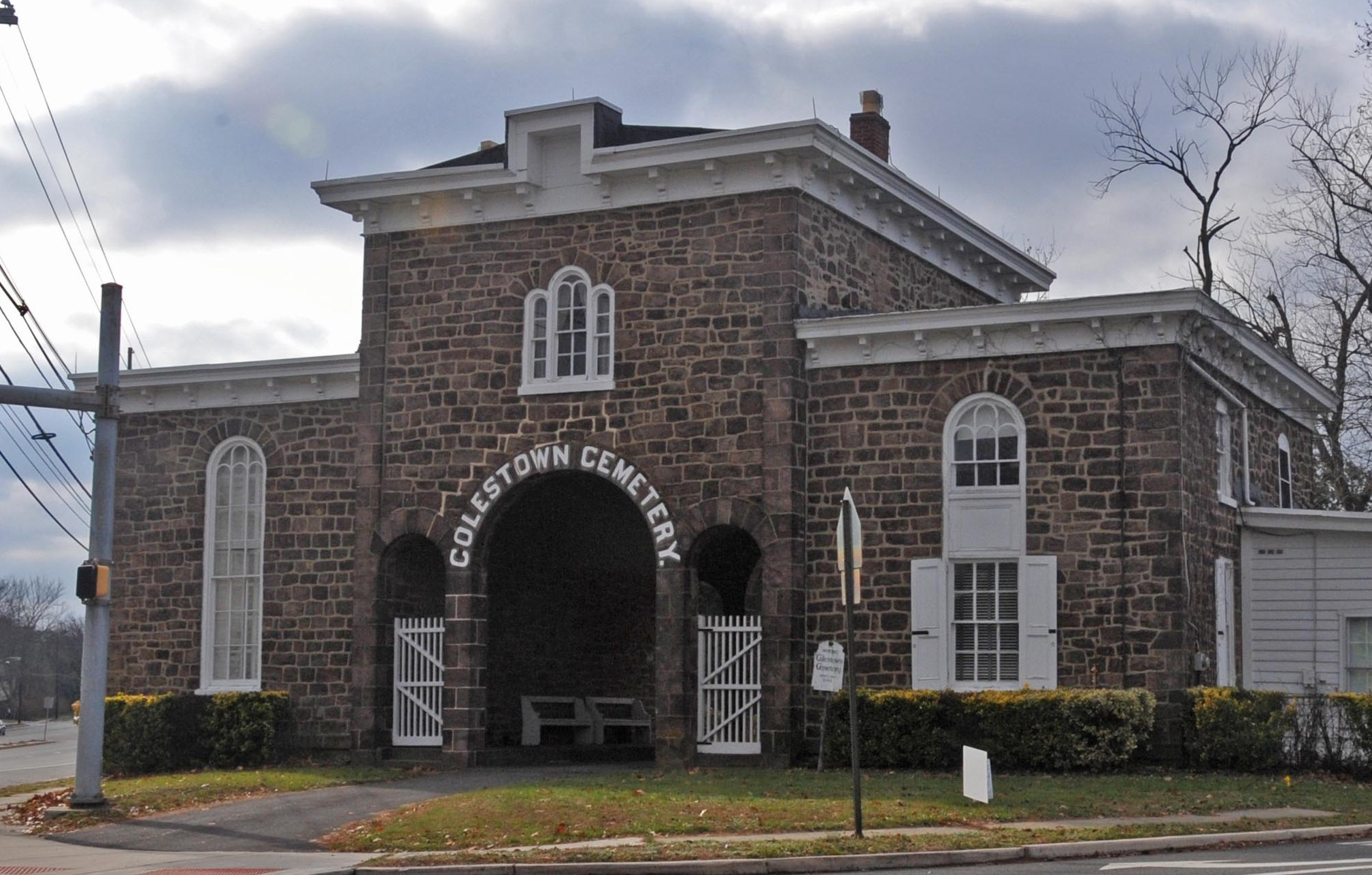
Colestown Cemetery

Colestown Cemetery is in Cherry Hill Township in Camden County, New Jersey, United States, and is located at the intersection of Church Road and Kings Highway. The Gatehouse to the cemetery was listed on the National Register of Historic Places in 1975.

The area now known as Cherry Hill was originally settled by the Lenni-Lenape Native Americans who coexisted peacefully with the first settlers from England, namely Quaker followers of William Penn who arrived in the late 17th century. The first settlement was a small cluster of homes named Colestown, in the perimeters of what is now the Colestown Cemetery.

== Notable burials ==
- Alexander G. Cattell (1816–1894), Represented New Jersey in the United States Senate from 1867 to 1871.
- George Robert Cholister (1898–1924), Medal of Honor recipient for his actions on the USS Trenton (CL-11). After powder bags in her forward turret exploded during a gunnery drill setting a fire, Cholister was killed from injuries resulting from a failed attempt to dump powder charges into the immersion tank before they detonated.
- John Stiles Collins (1837–1928), Moorestown farmer who began the development of Miami Beach, Florida.
- Charles G. Garrison (1849–1924), Justice of the New Jersey Supreme Court from 1888 to 1893 and 1896 to 1900.
- Andrew K. Hay (1809–1881), represented New Jersey's 1st congressional district in the United States House of Representatives from 1849 to 1851.
- Alfred Hunt (1817–1888), first president of Bethlehem Iron Company, precursor of Bethlehem Steel.
- Francis F. Patterson, Jr. (1867–1935), represented New Jersey's 1st congressional district in the United States House of Representatives from 1920 to 1927.
