= Charles P. Snyder (admiral) =

United States admiral (1879–1964)

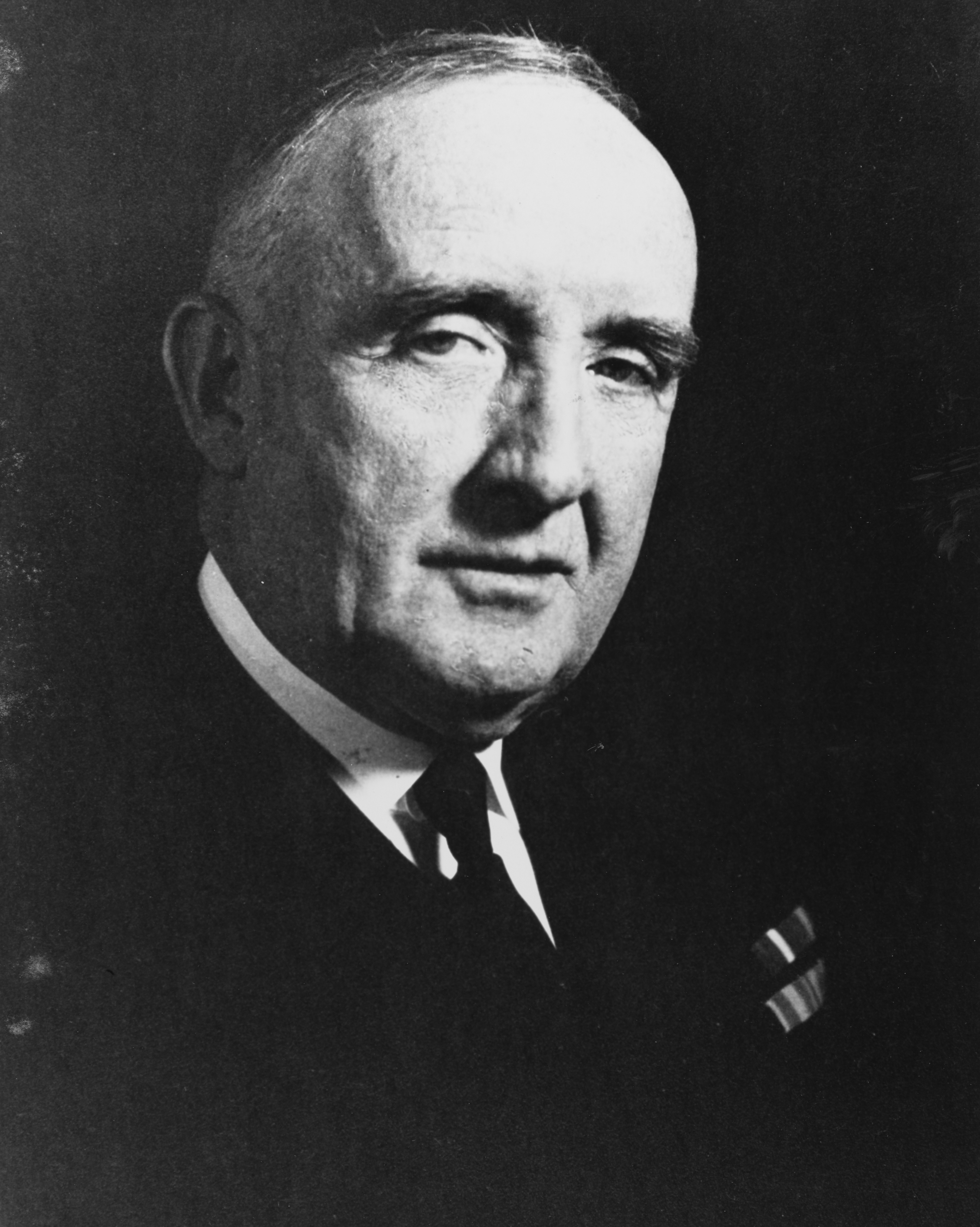
- Born: Charles Philip Snyder; July 10, 1879; Charleston, West Virginia, U.S.
- Died: December 3, 1964 (aged 85); Bethesda, Maryland, U.S.
- Military career
- Allegiance: United States of America
- Branch: United States Navy
- Service years: 1900–1946
- Rank: Admiral
- Commands: Battle Force
- Conflicts: World War I World War II
- Awards: Navy Cross; Distinguished Service Medal

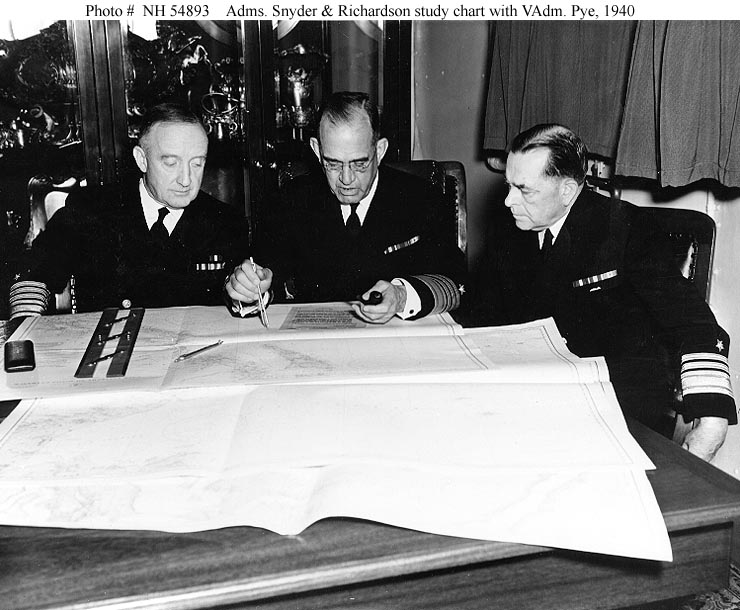
Snyder as Commander Battle Force (left), with Admiral James O. Richardson (center) and Vice Admiral William S. Pye (right) in 1940.

Charles Philip Snyder (July 10, 1879 – December 3, 1964) was a four-star admiral in the United States Navy who served as the U.S. Navy's first Naval Inspector General during World War II.

== Early career ==
Born in Charleston, West Virginia in Kanawha County to future West Virginia Congressman Charles P. Snyder and Jane Goshorn, he attended Washington and Lee University for one year before entering the U.S. Naval Academy in 1896. Graduating fourth in his class in 1900, he served the standard two years at sea as a passed cadet before being commissioned ensign in 1902 and assigned to the battleship Alabama.

Promoted to lieutenant, he reported to the Naval Academy on August 16, 1905 as an instructor in navigation and mechanics. In February 1906, he was called before a Congressional subcommittee to testify about his role as the disciplinary officer in charge during a notorious hazing incident that had resulted in an upper class man being acquitted at court-martial for the injury of a fourth class man on the grounds that he and other upper class men had understood Snyder to have tacitly encouraged the hazing.

During World War I, he commanded the battleship Oregon, flagship of the Pacific Fleet; the cruiser Minneapolis; and the transport Mongolia. He graduated from the Naval War College in 1925. Promoted to captain, he served as commandant of midshipmen at the Naval Academy, on staff at the Naval War College, and as manager of the Portsmouth Navy Yard.

== Flag officer ==
He was promoted to rear admiral with date of rank March 1, 1933 while serving as chief of staff to Admiral David F. Sellers, who was Commander Battleships, Battle Force, U.S. Fleet from 1932 to 1933 and Commander in Chief, U.S. Fleet from 1933 to 1934. Snyder was commandant of the Portsmouth Navy Yard from 1934 to 1935, then commanded a heavy cruiser division of the Scouting Force, followed by a battleship division of the Battle Force, before serving as President of the Naval War College from January 2, 1937 to May 27, 1939. He returned to sea in 1939 as Commander Battleships, Battle Force, with the temporary rank of vice admiral.

On January 6, 1940, he hoisted his four-star flag on board the battleship California as Commander Battle Force with the temporary rank of admiral. As commander of the Battle Force, he was second in command of the U.S. Fleet, under Admiral James O. Richardson. In January 1941, Richardson was relieved over a dispute about fleet basing and replaced by Husband E. Kimmel, a junior rear admiral. Simultaneously, the fleet was reorganized and the position of Commander Battle Force was downgraded to three stars, a change scheduled to take effect upon the completion of Snyder's tour that summer. For reasons of his own, Snyder had no desire to serve under Kimmel, and asked to be relieved immediately. He was succeeded by Vice Admiral William S. Pye on January 31, 1941, one day before Kimmel ascended to command and eleven months before most of the Battle Force's battleships were sunk at anchor during the Japanese attack on Pearl Harbor.

== World War II ==
Upon relinquishing command of the Battle Force, he reverted to his permanent rank of rear admiral and became a member of the General Board with additional duty as the president of the Board for Inspection of Military Readiness in Naval Districts. As a member of the General Board, Snyder participated in the debate over the role of African American sailors in the Navy. The Navy's policy was to confine black sailors to menial duties as stewards and messmen, excluding them from general service on the grounds that they were unable to maintain discipline among white subordinates and therefore had to be segregated, which was impractical at sea. When the General Board convened on January 23, 1942, Snyder suggested expanding black enlistment in rigidly segregated support roles outside the service branches: in the Aviation Branch, following the Army's lead; aboard auxiliaries and minor vessels, especially transports; or in the Musician's Branch, because "the colored race is very musical and they are versed in all forms of rhythm."

From May 1942 until April 1946, he served as the first Naval Inspector General. The Naval Inspector General was used as a troubleshooter during World War II, inspecting shore facilities and investigating misconduct. As but one of 24 inspection authorities concerned with Navy procurement and administration of activities ashore, he was instructed to keep the organization small and to rely on augmentation from the Fleet. He retired in August 1943 upon reaching the statutory age, and was advanced to admiral on the retired list as the highest rank in which he had served, but remained on active duty as inspector general until the end of the war. In early 1946, he investigated the sinking of the heavy cruiser Indianapolis in his official capacity as inspector general, but agreed to curtail his investigation so that Fleet Admiral Ernest J. King and Navy Secretary James V. Forrestal could immediately court-martial Indianapolis's commanding officer, Captain Charles B. McVay III. Snyder was decorated with Navy Distinguished Service Medal for his service during World War II.

== Personal life ==
He married the former Cornelia Lee Wolcott on July 10, 1902, and had three children: Elizabeth; Philip, who retired from the Navy as a rear admiral; and Jane. He died at the Naval Hospital in Bethesda, Maryland in 1964. He is buried in Arlington National Cemetery. He married Edith Hanlon Christian in 1949. His decorations include the Navy Cross for eminent and conspicuous service in World War I, and a special letter of commendation from the War Department. He received an honorary Doctor of Laws degree (LL.D.) from Washington and Lee College on January 24, 1943, and the Sigma Chi fraternity distinguished medal for conspicuous public service in 1940.

His great-granddaughter is actress Elizabeth McGovern.

Military offices
Preceded by Edward C. Kalbfus	President of the Naval War College; 2 January 1937 – 27 May 1939	Succeeded by Edward C. Kalbfus
Preceded by James O. Richardson	Commander, Battle Force, United States Fleet; 6 January 1940 – 31 January 1941	Succeeded by William S. Pye
