= USS Drexler =

Allen M. Sumner-class destroyer

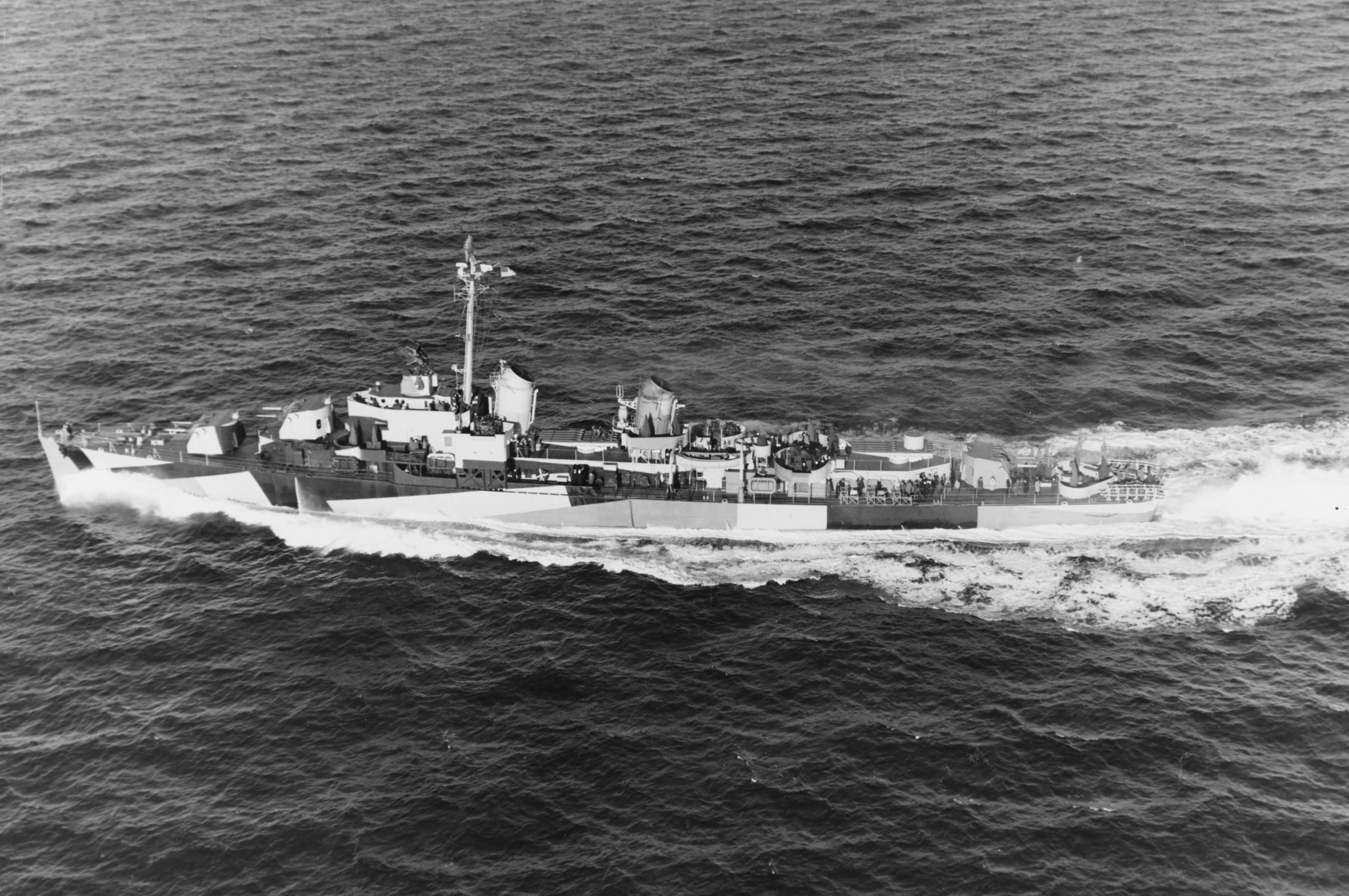
- USS Drexler

History

United States
- Namesake: Henry Clay Drexler
- Builder: Bath Iron Works
- Laid down: 24 April 1944
- Launched: 3 September 1944
- Commissioned: 14 November 1944
- Honors and awards: One Battle star
- Fate: Sunk by kamikaze 28 May 1945

General characteristics
- Class & type: Allen M. Sumner-class destroyer
- Displacement: 2,200 tons
- Length: 376 ft 6 in (114.8 m)
- Beam: 40 ft (12.2 m)
- Draft: 15 ft 8 in (4.8 m)
- Propulsion: 60,000 shp (45 MW); 2 propellers
- Speed: 34 knots (63 km/h)
- Range: 6500 nmi. (12,000 km) @ 15 kt
- Complement: 357
- Armament: 6 × 5 in./38 guns (12 cm), 12 × 40mm AA guns, 11 × 20mm AA guns, 10 × 21 inch (533 mm) torpedo tubes, 6 × depth charge projectors, 2 × depth charge tracks

USS Drexler (DD-741), an Allen M. Sumner-class destroyer, was named for Ensign Henry Clay Drexler, a 1924 graduate of the Naval Academy who was killed in a turret explosion on USS Trenton (CL-11) in October 1924, earning the Medal of Honor for his efforts to limit damage by placing a flaming bag of powder into an immersion tank.

The Drexler was launched on 3 September 1944 by Bath Iron Works Corp., in Bath, Maine; sponsored by Mrs. L. A. Drexler, the mother of Ensign Drexler; and commissioned on 14 November 1944.

== Service history ==
Sailing from Norfolk on 23 January 1945 to escort Bon Homme Richard to Trinidad, Drexler then sailed on to reach San Diego on 10 February. Three days later she got underway for Pearl Harbor for antiaircraft and shore bombardment exercises until the 23rd, when she sailed on escort duty to Guadalcanal and Ulithi, the staging area for the Okinawa invasion.

Drexler departed Ulithi 27 March 1945 bound for Okinawa and duty on a radar picket station. On 28 May at 07:00, two kamikazes attacked Drexler and Lowry. The first was downed by the combined fire of the two destroyers and planes from the combat air patrol. The second tried to crash onto Lowry but missed, hitting Drexler instead and cutting off all power and starting large gasoline fires. Despite the heavy damage, she kept firing, aiding in shooting down two planes which attacked immediately after the crash. At 07:03 she was hit by another aircraft, a twin-engined "Frances" P1Y1 bomber, and the impact rolled her on to her beam ends, causing her to sink in less than 50 seconds. at 27°6′N 127°38′E Because of the speed with which she sank, casualties were heavy: 168 dead and 52 wounded. The captain was one of the wounded.

Two weeks before Drexler was sunk Commander Louis Drexler, Jr. (USNA 1923 and the older brother of namesake Henry Drexler) was killed in action off Okinawa.

== Wreck ==
On 24 March 2026, the Lost 52 Project led by Tiburon Subsea CEO Tim Taylor, announced that the wreck of Drexler had been discovered in 2025 as part of their USS Bonefish expedition.

== Awards ==
Drexler received one battle star for World War II service.
