= Gatehouse at Colestown Cemetery =

- U.S. National Register of Historic Places
- New Jersey Register of Historic Places
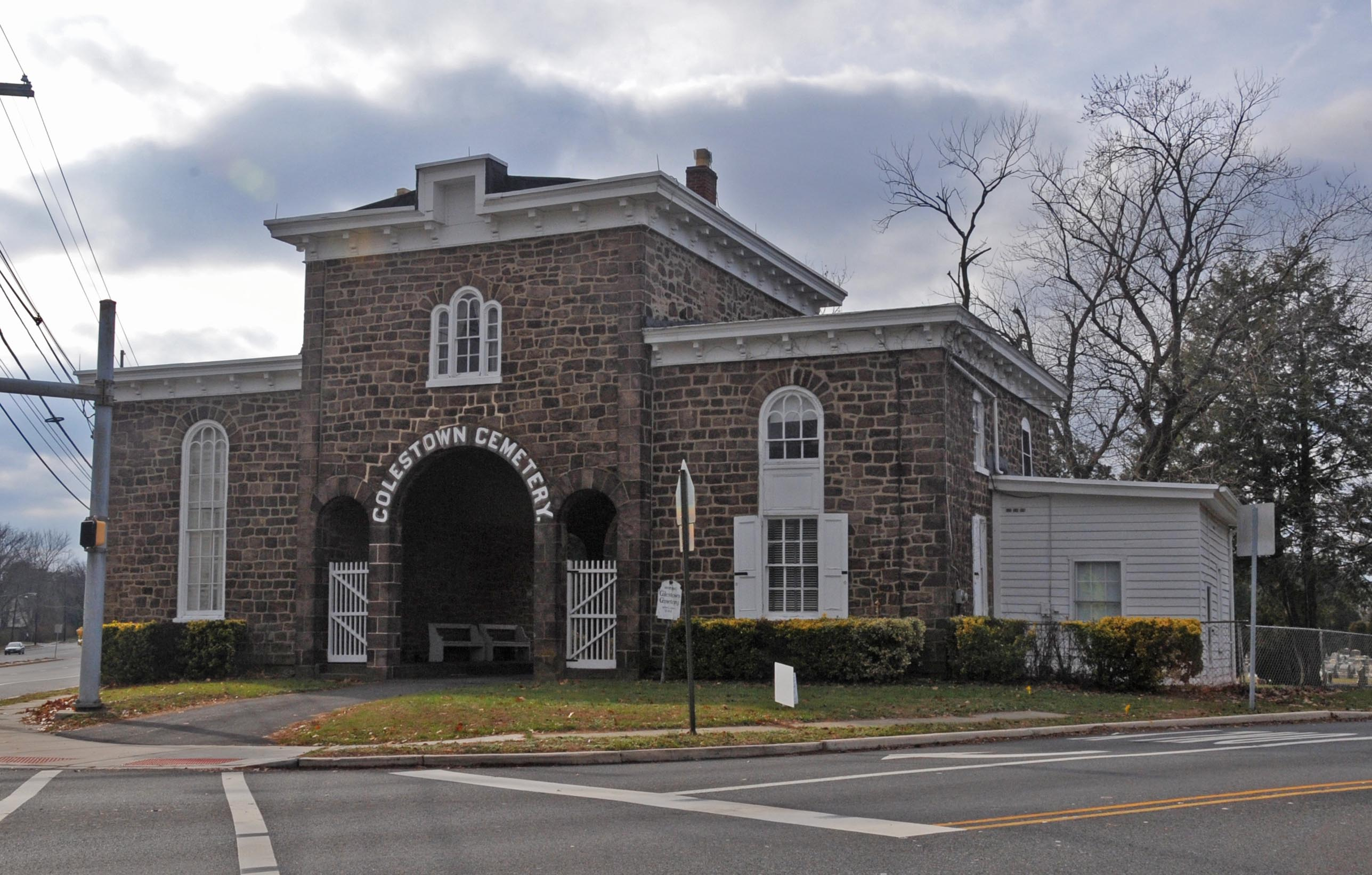

- Location within Camden County, New Jersey Location within New Jersey Location within the United States
- Location: Kings Highway and Church Road, Cherry Hill, New Jersey
- Coordinates: 39°56′0″N 74°59′24″W
- Area: 9.9 acres (4.0 ha)
- Built: 1858
- Architect: Charles Wilson
- Architectural style: Italianate, Romanesque
- NRHP reference No.: 75001128
- NJRHP No.: 943

Significant dates
- Added to NRHP: May 21, 1975
- Designated NJRHP: March 25, 1975

The Gatehouse at Colestown Cemetery is located at the intersection of Kings Highway and Church Road in the township of Cherry Hill in Camden County, New Jersey, United States. The gatehouse was built in 1858 for the Colestown Cemetery. It was added to the National Register of Historic Places on May 21, 1975, for its significance in social history.

== See also ==
- National Register of Historic Places listings in Camden County, New Jersey
