= William S. Pye =

United States Navy admiral (1880–1959)

William Satterlee Pye
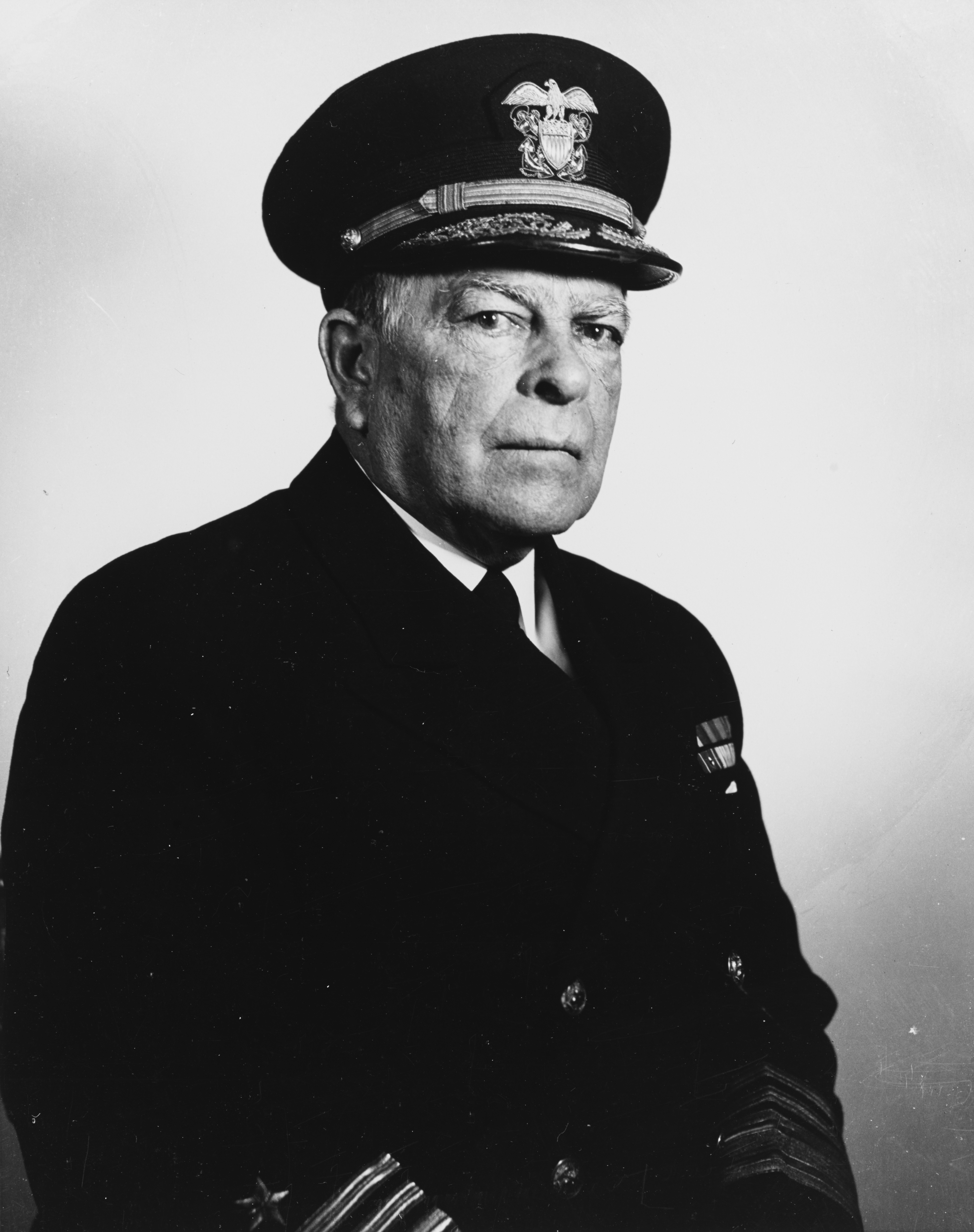
- Vice Admiral William S. Pye, USN
- Born: 9 June 1880; Minneapolis, Minnesota, U.S.
- Died: 4 May 1959 (aged 78); Bethesda, Maryland, U.S.
- Burial place: Arlington National Cemetery
- Military career
- Allegiance: United States
- Branch: United States Navy
- Service years: 1901–1945
- Rank: Vice Admiral
- Commands: USS Farragut; Destroyer Division 31; USS Oglala; US Naval Mission, Peru; USS Nevada; Commander, Destroyers Scouting Force, Pacific Fleet; Commander, Destroyers Battle Force, Pacific Fleet; Commander, Battleships Battle Force, Pacific Fleet; Commander, Battle Force, Pacific Fleet; Commander, Pacific Fleet (acting); Task Force One; Naval Operating Base, Newport; President of the Naval War College
- Conflicts: World War I World War II
- Awards: Navy Cross; Legion of Merit; World War I Victory Medal; World War II Victory Medal; Spanish Campaign Medal; American Defense Service Medal

Vice Admiral William Satterlee Pye (9 June 1880 – 4 May 1959) was a U.S. Navy officer who served during World War I and World War II, but never saw combat action. His last active-duty appointment was as President of the Naval War College, in 1942–1946. His awards included the Navy Cross for his distinguished service as a staff officer during World War I.

== Career through World War I ==
Pye was born in Minneapolis, Minnesota, on 9 June 1880. Entering the United States Naval Academy in 1897, he graduated in 1901 and was commissioned an ensign in June 1903. One of his classmates was Fleet Admiral Ernest J. King. From 1901 through 1915, he served in several ships, among them five battleships and an armored cruiser, and was also assigned to the staffs of the Naval Academy and Naval War College. In 1915–1916 he placed the new destroyer USS Jacob Jones into commission. He relinquished command of Jacob Jones before her 1917 deployment to Europe with the US entry into World War I, and joined the staff of the Commander in Chief, Atlantic Fleet. He served in that position through the war, receiving the Navy Cross "for exceptionally distinguished and valuable service on the staff of the commander in chief, U.S. Atlantic Fleet, in addition to excellent performance of his routine staff duties in preparing a series of orders for the conduct of battleship and fleet, based upon the best thought and experience of the United States fleet and British fleet during the late war."

== Interwar years ==
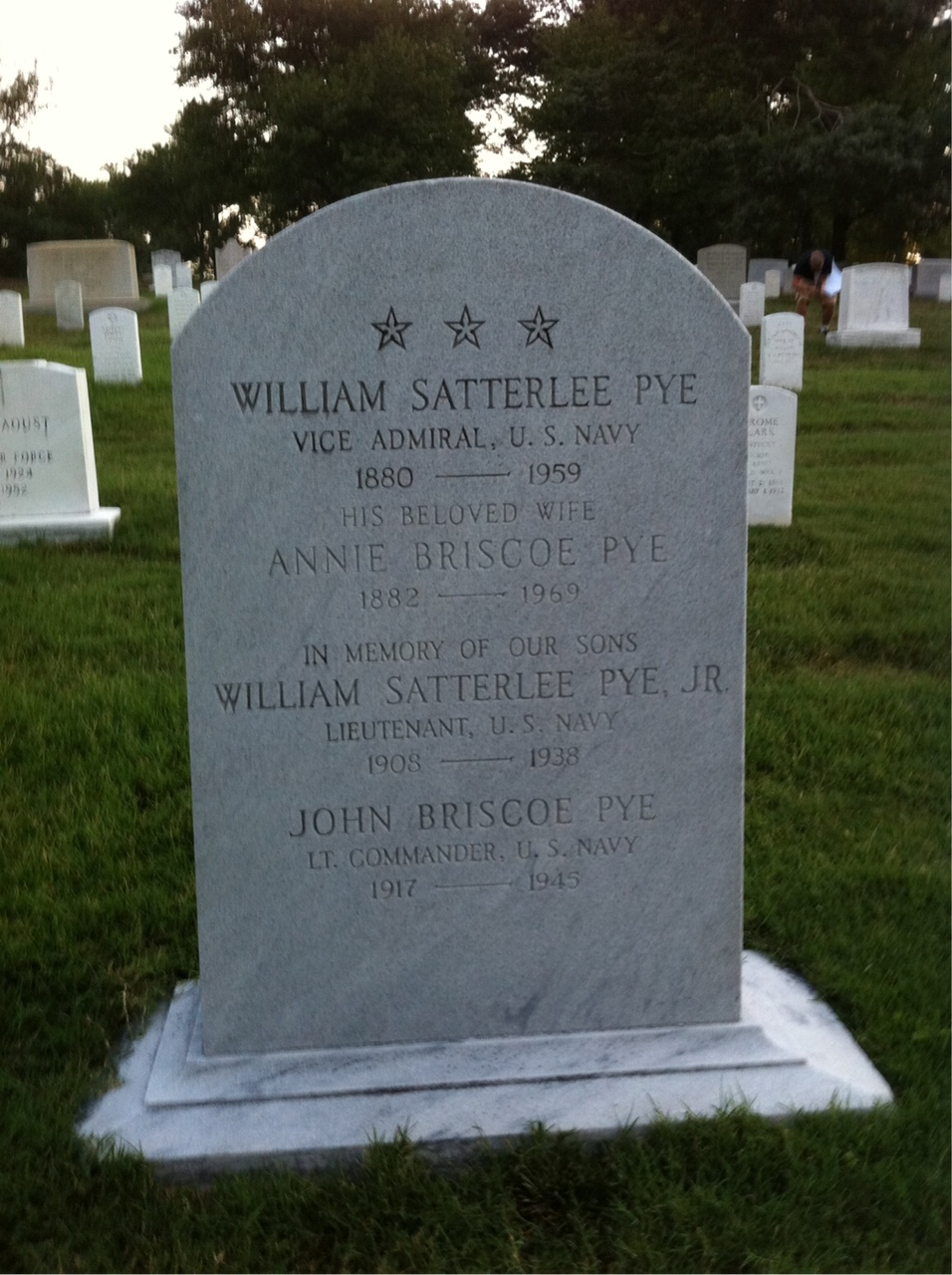
Grave at Arlington National Cemetery

Pye served in the Office of the Chief of Naval Operations in 1919–1921, and was executive officer of the battleship Pennsylvania in 1922–1923. Late in 1923, Pye served as a destroyer division commander. His division was the second in line at the Honda Point Disaster, and two of his destroyers were among those lost. He returned to Washington, D.C., for service at the Navy Department, which lasted into 1927. In the next five years, he commanded the minelayer Oglala, had more Navy Department service, and was head of the U.S. Naval Mission to Peru. Captain Pye commanded the battleship Nevada in 1932–1933.

Promoted to the rank of rear admiral, Pye served as chief of staff to Commander Scouting Force, attended the Naval War College, had further Navy Department service, and was Commander Destroyers in both the Scouting Force and Battle Force of the Pacific Fleet. With the temporary rank of Vice Admiral, he was Commander Battleships, Battle Force in 1940 and Commander Battle Force (COMBATFOR) in 1941.

== World War II and post-war years ==
He is perhaps best known for his 6 December 1941 remark that "The Japanese will not go to war with the United States. We are too big, too powerful, and too strong." Following the Japanese attack on Pearl Harbor on 7 December 1941 and the subsequent relief of Commander-in-Chief, Pacific Fleet (CINCPAC) Admiral Husband E. Kimmel, Vice Admiral Pye became Acting CINCPAC on 17 December. He had reservations about Kimmel's plan to send a relief force including the aircraft carrier USS Saratoga to the aid of Wake Island, but continued with the plan until 22 December. Then – after reports of additional landings on Wake – Pye decided the operation was too risky and recalled the relief force. This decision was highly controversial, as it amounted to abandoning the Wake Island garrison, which had defeated a Japanese landing on 11 December.

On 31 December, Pye relinquished command of the Pacific Fleet to Admiral Chester W. Nimitz. Pye became commander of Task Force One (TF 1), comprising the remaining operational battleships of the Pacific Fleet augmented by three battleships from the Atlantic Fleet, now based in San Francisco. During the Battle of Midway, Pye received orders for the seven standard-type battleships (Colorado, Idaho, Maryland, Mississippi, New Mexico, Pennsylvania, and Tennessee), the escort carrier USS Long Island, and eight destroyers of TF 1 to sortie to patrol off of the West Coast against possible Japanese attack there should the carrier forces at Midway be defeated. Such fears proved unfounded, and TF 1 then remained on training and patrol duties between Hawaii and the West Coast until Pye was relieved in October 1942 at the age of 62. He never commanded operating forces again, and was relegated to administrative positions. On 2 November, Pye became President of the Naval War College in Newport, Rhode Island, and also commanded the Naval Operating Base there. He officially retired on 1 July 1944, but was recalled to active duty as President of the War College, and promoted to permanent Vice Admiral. He continued at the War College until retiring from active duty on 1 March 1946. Pye died at Bethesda, Maryland, on 4 May 1959. He is buried in Arlington National Cemetery, United States.

Pye's oldest son, LT William Satterlee Pye, Jr., was killed in a plane crash in 1938. His youngest son, Lieutenant Commander John Briscoe Pye, served on the submarine USS Swordfish on her 13th and final war patrol. Swordfish was lost with all hands on 12 January 1945, off Kyushu, Japan.

== Awards ==
=== Navy Cross citation ===

The President of the United States of America takes pleasure in presenting the Navy Cross to Commander William Satterlee Pye (NSN: 3794), United States Navy, for exceptionally distinguished and valuable service on the Staff of the Commander in Chief, U.S. Atlantic Fleet, in addition to excellent performance of his routine staff duties in preparing a series of orders for the conduct of battleship and fleet, based upon the best thought and experience of the United States fleet and British fleet during the late war.

=== Legion of Merit citation ===
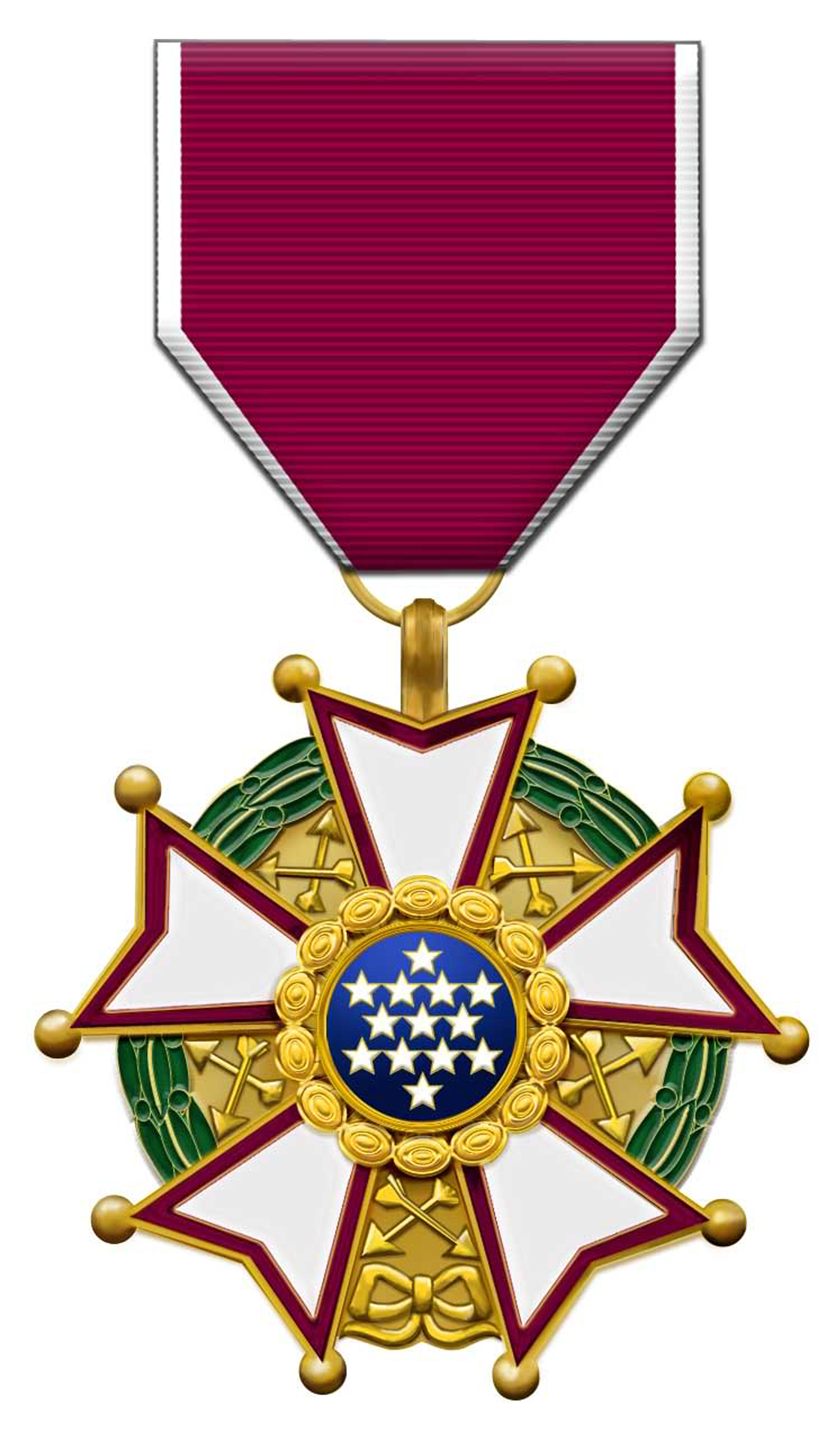

The President of the United States of America takes pleasure in presenting the Legion of Merit to Vice Admiral (Retired) William Satterlee Pye (NSN: 3794), United States Navy, for exceptionally meritorious conduct in the performance of outstanding services to the Government of the United States as President of the Naval War College, Newport, Rhode Island, from 2 November 1942 until 2 March 1946, and as Commandant, Naval Operating Base, Newport, Rhode Island, from 2 November 1942 until 1 July 1944. The supervision of the Naval War College and the Command of the Naval Operating Base was a dual task of unusual severity due to an intensified and accelerated course of study at the Naval War College and due to the general stress of wartime activity at the Naval Operating Base. Vice Admiral Pye by his sound judgment, initiative and untiring efforts maintained both the Naval War College and the Naval Operating Base during the critical war time period, upon high levels of operating efficiency. Realizing the necessity of furnishing large numbers of officers trained in the fundamental concepts of Naval warfare and in the exercise of command, Vice Admiral Pye designated and established the wartime Command and Preparatory Staff Courses at the Naval War College. Under his able leadership over 600 Naval Officers received advanced training in these streamlined courses and their services were a distinct contribution to the ultimate triumph of our victorious fleet. Under the supervision of Vice Admiral Pye in his capacity as Commandant of the Naval Operating Base, the major function of the Naval Training Station was changed, in the early months of 1944 from that of training thousands of enlisted personnel, integrating them into efficient operating teams for our powerful fighting units afloat. A large share of the credit for the success of the pre-commissioning program was due to the untiring and careful attention of Vice Admiral Pye in its establishment and during the formative stages of its development. Vice Admiral Pye's outstanding professional attainments, his loyalty and patriotism, and his ideals of service have been an example and inspiration to all, both staff and student body who were fortunate enough to be associated with him at either the Naval War College or the Naval Operating Base.

Military offices
Preceded by Husband E. Kimmel	Commander in Chief of the United States Pacific Fleet; 1941	Succeeded by Chester W. Nimitz
Preceded by Edward C. Kalbfus	President of the Naval War College; 1942-1946	Succeeded by Raymond A. Spruance
