= Henry Clay Drexler =

US Navy ensign and Medal of Honor recipient (1901–1924)

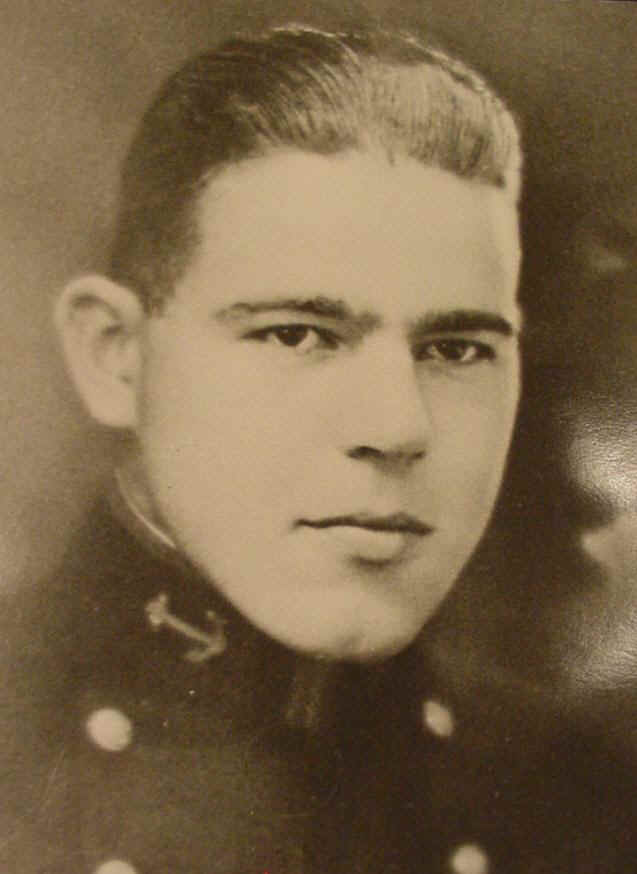
- Henry Clay Drexler, USN
- Born: August 7, 1901; Braddock, Pennsylvania, US
- Died: October 20, 1924 (aged 23); Norfolk, Virginia, US
- Burial place: Arlington National Cemetery
- Military career
- Allegiance: United States of America
- Branch: United States Navy
- Service years: 1924
- Rank: Ensign
- Unit: USS Trenton (CL-11)
- Awards: Medal of Honor; Navy Cross

Henry Clay Drexler (August 7, 1901 – October 20, 1924) was an Ensign in the United States Navy and a recipient of both the Navy Cross and the Medal of Honor.

== Biography ==
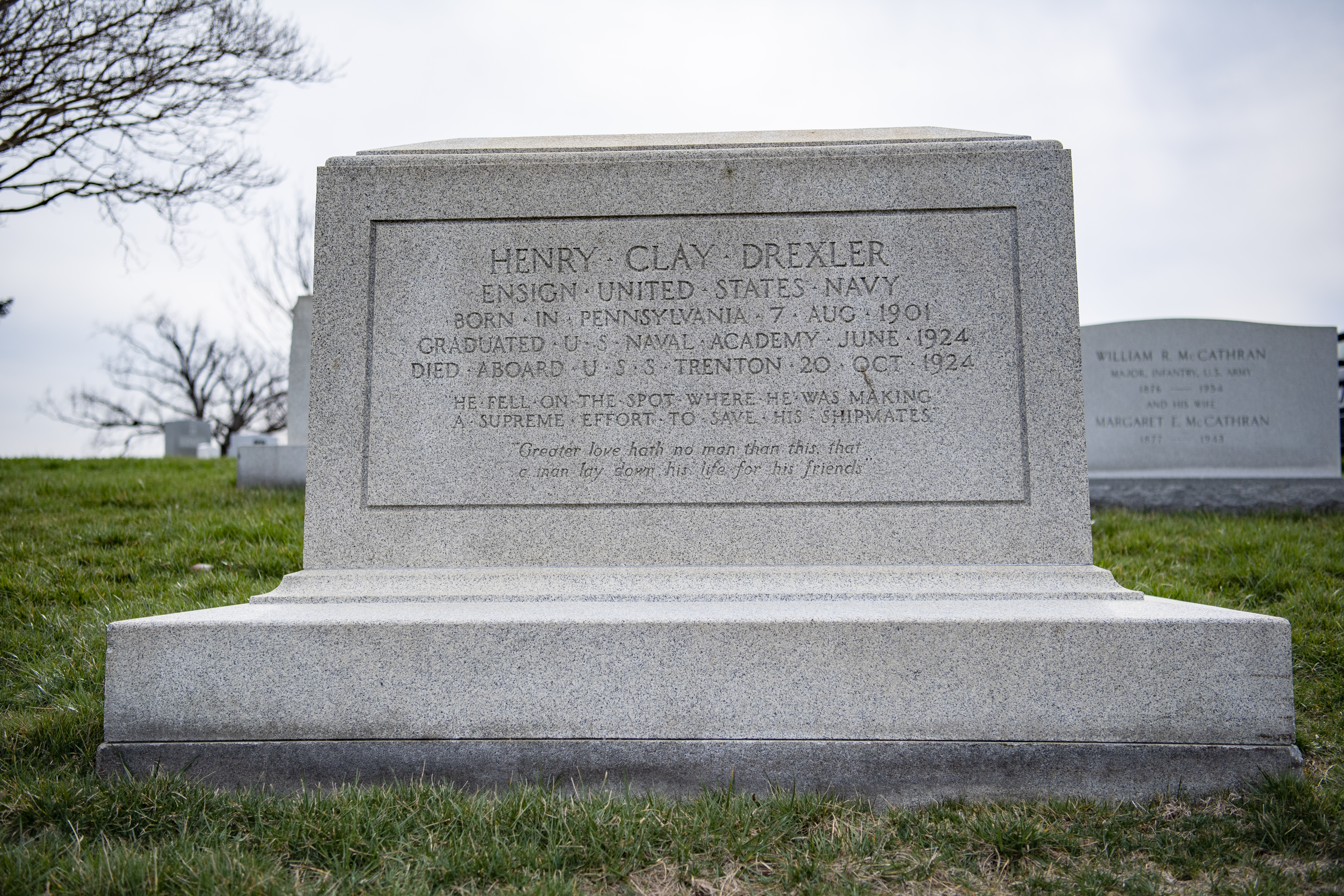
Grave at Arlington National Cemetery

Born in Braddock, Pennsylvania, on August 7, 1901, Drexler grew up in a seaside home in Bethany Beach, Delaware. His father, Louis Drexler, was a Delaware state senator. The family home still stands in Bethany Beach, although it has been moved further inland. Attended Culver Military Academy located in Culver, Indiana. Like his older brother Louis, Henry Drexler attended the United States Naval Academy, graduating in June 1924.

In mid-October of that year, while Trenton (CL-11) was conducting gunnery drills in the Norfolk area, powder bags in her forward turret exploded, killing or injuring every member of the gun crew. During the ensuing fire Ensign Drexler and Boatswain's Mate First Class George Robert Cholister attempted to dump powder charges into the immersion tank before they detonated but failed. Drexler was killed when the charge exploded, and Cholister was overcome by fire and fumes before he could reach his objective. He died the following day. Both men were posthumously awarded the Medal of Honor.

Drexler was subsequently buried in Arlington National Cemetery. The destroyer Drexler (DD-741) was named in his honor. Drexler was sunk off Okinawa on May 28, 1945 - two weeks after Drexler's older brother Commander Louis Drexler Jr. was killed in action off of Okinawa.

== Medal of Honor citation ==
Drexler's official Medal of Honor citation reads:

For extraordinary heroism in the line of his profession on the occasion of a fire on board the U.S.S. Trenton. At 3:35 on the afternoon of 20 October 1924, while the Trenton was preparing to fire trial installation shots from the two 6-inch guns in the forward twin mount of that vessel, 2 charges of powder ignited. Twenty men were trapped in the twin mount. Four died almost immediately and 10 later from burns and inhalation of flame and gases. The 6 others were severely injured. Ens. Drexler, without thought of his own safety, on seeing that the charge of powder for the left gun was ignited, jumped for the right charge and endeavored to put it in the immersion tank. The left charge burst into flame and ignited the right charge before Ens. Drexler could accomplish his purpose. He met his death while making a supreme effort to save his shipmates.

== See also ==
- List of Medal of Honor recipients during peacetime
