= George Robert Cholister =

United States Navy sailor and Medal of Honor recipient (1898–1924)

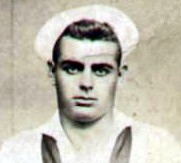
- George Robert Cholister
- Born: December 18, 1898; Camden, New Jersey, US
- Died: October 21, 1924 (aged 25); Hampton Roads, off Norfolk, Virginia, US
- Burial place: Colestown Cemetery, Cherry Hill Township, New Jersey, US
- Military career
- Allegiance: United States
- Branch: United States Navy
- Service years: 1922 – 1924
- Rank: Boatswain's Mate, First Class
- Unit: USS Trenton (CL-11)
- Conflicts: None, peacetime award
- Awards: Medal of Honor

George Robert Cholister (December 18, 1898 – October 21, 1924) was a United States Navy sailor awarded a posthumous Medal of Honor for his actions on October 20, 1924. His medal was awarded by a special act of the United States Congress. Ensign Henry Clay Drexler was awarded a Medal of Honor and Navy Cross for the same heroism. Boatswain's Mate Cholister is buried in Cherry Hill, New Jersey at Colestown Cemetery.

== Medal of Honor citation ==
Rank and organization: Boatswain's Mate First Class, U.S. Navy. Born: December 18, 1898, Camden, N.J. Accredited to: New Jersey. (Awarded by Special Act of Congress February 3, 1933.)

Citation:

For extraordinary heroism in the line of his profession on the occasion of a fire on board the U S.S. Trenton. At 3:35 on the afternoon of October 20, 1924, while the Trenton was preparing to fire trial installation shots from the two 6-inch guns in the forward twin mount of that vessel, 2 charges of powder ignited. Twenty men were trapped in the twin mount. Four died almost immediately and 10 later from burns and inhalation of flames and gases. The 6 others were severely injured. Cholister, without thought of his own safety, on seeing that the charge of powder from the left gun was ignited, jumped for the right charge and endeavored to put it in the immersion tank. The left charge burst into flame and ignited the right charge before Cholister could accomplish his purpose. He fell unconscious while making a supreme effort to save his shipmates and died the following day.

== See also ==
- List of Medal of Honor recipients
- List of Medal of Honor recipients during Peacetime
