= List of major U.S. Commands of World War II =

The List of major U.S. Commands of World War II includes major military commands of the United States. These are units above corps level.

== Major armies Commands ==
- Army Air Forces (USAAF): Formed 9 March 1942.
- Army Ground Forces (AGF): Formed 9 March 1942.
- Army Service Forces (ASF): Formed 9 March 1942 as Services of Supply (USASOS); renamed on 12 March 1943.

== Theater commands ==
- European Theater of Operations (ETO): Formed 8 June 1942.
- North African Theater of Operations (NATO): Formed 4 February 1943. Redesignated Mediterranean Theater of Operations (MTO) on 1 November 1944.
- Central Pacific Area (COMCENPAC): Primary subordinate command of Pacific Ocean Areas, also commanded by Chester W. Nimitz through the war.
- North Pacific Area (COMNORPAC): Formed in April 1942 as a subordinate command of Pacific Ocean Areas, commanded by Robert A. Theobald to January 1943, Thomas C. Kinkaid to October 1943, and Frank J. Fletcher through the end of the war.
- Pacific Ocean Areas (CINCPOA): Formed in April 1942 as primarily Navy command in the Pacific, consisting of Central Pacific Area, South Pacific Area, and North Pacific Area. Commanded by Chester W. Nimitz through the war.
- South Pacific Area (COMSOPAC): Formed in April 1942 as a subordinate command of Pacific Ocean Areas, commanded by Robert L. Ghormley through October 1942, William Halsey, Jr. to June 1944, John H. Newton to March 1945, and Admiral William L. Calhoun to the end of the war.
- Southeast Pacific Area (COMSOEASPAC): Formed in April 1942. Never became an active theater of war. Commanded by Ernest King throughout the war.
- South West Pacific Area (COMSOWESPAC): Formed on 30 March 1942. Commanded by Douglas MacArthur throughout the war.
- China Burma India Theater (CBI): Formed 2 February 1944. Commanded by Joseph W. Stilwell. Split into China Theater under Albert Coady Wedemeyer and India Burma Theater under Daniel I. Sultan on 24 October 1944.

== Army groups ==
- First United States Army Group
- Sixth United States Army Group
- Twelfth United States Army Group
- Fifteenth Army Group

== Armies ==
- First United States Army: Existed prior to the war, shipped to England in October 1943. Landed in Normandy and was in North-West Europe through the end of the war in Europe, then redeployed for the invasion of Japan. Commanded by Omar Bradley from October 1943 to August 1944, and Courtney Hodges thereafter.
- Second United States Army: Remained in the United States through the war.
- Third United States Army: Existed prior to the war, shipped to England in January 1944. Shipped to France in July 1944 and remained in North-West Europe through the end of the war. Commanded by George S. Patton from January 1944 to the end of the war.
- Fourth United States Army: Remained in the United States.
- Fifth United States Army: Activated in August 1943 at Algiers. Landed at Salerno in September 1943 and remained in Italy through the war. Commanded by Mark W. Clark to November 1944 and Lucian Truscott through the end of the war.
- Sixth United States Army: Activated in January 1943 in the United States from the Third Army headquarters. Commanded by Walter Krueger throughout the war. Served in the South West Pacific Area, where it participated in the campaigns in New Guinea and the Philippines.
- Seventh United States Army: Activated in July 1943 from the I Armored Corps headquarters under the Command of George S. Patton. Briefly commanded by Mark W. Clark and then by Alexander Patch until the end of the war. Landed in Sicily in July 1943 and Southern France in August 1944, and remained in North-West Europe through the end of the war.
- Eighth United States Army: Activated in June 1944 in the United States. Commanded by Robert L. Eichelberger until the end of the war. Served in the South West Pacific Area, where it participated in the campaigns in New Guinea and the Philippines.
- Ninth United States Army: Activated in May 1944 in the United States from the Fourth Army. Commanded by William H. Simpson until the end of the war. Served in North-West Europe.
- Tenth United States Army: Activated in Hawaii in June 1944. Landed on Okinawa in April 1945. Commanded by Simon B. Buckner until he was killed in action in June 1945, then by Roy S. Geiger and Joseph W. Stilwell
- Fifteenth United States Army: Activated in the United States from the Fourth Army in August 1944. Commanded by Leonard T. Gerow from January 1945. Served in North-West Europe through the end of the war.

== Fleets ==
- Asiatic Fleet
- Atlantic Fleet
- Pacific Fleet
- Third Fleet
- Fourth Fleet
- Fifth Fleet
- Seventh Fleet
- Eighth Fleet
- Ninth Fleet
- Tenth Fleet
- Twelfth Fleet
- Sixteen Fleet

== Seaboards ==
- Alaska Sea Frontier
- Caribbean Sea Frontier
- Eastern Sea Frontier
- Gulf Sea Frontier
- Hawaiian Sea Frontier
- Moroccan Sea Frontier
- Northwest Sea Frontier
- Panama Sea Frontier
- Philippine Sea Frontier
- Western Sea Frontier

== Naval Task Forces ==
- Task Force 38
- Task Force 58

== Naval Forces ==
- United States Naval Forces Europe
- Naval Forces France
- United States Naval Forces Germany
- Amphibious Force, Pacific Fleet (ComPhibPac)
- Amphibious Force North Pacific
- Amphibious Force South Pacific
- Amphibious Force South-West Pacific
- Amphibious Training Command
- III Amphibious Force
- V Amphibious Force
- VII Amphibious Force
- IX Amphibious Force
- XI Amphibious Force

== Marine commands ==
- Fleet Marine Force, Pacific (FMFPac)
- III Amphibious Corps (III AC)
- V Amphibious Corps (VAC)

== Air Forces ==
- First Air Force
- Second Air Force
- Third Air Force
- Fourth Air Force
- Fifth Air Force
- Sixth Air Force
- Seventh Air Force
- Eighth Air Force
- Ninth Air Force
- Tenth Air Force
- Eleventh Air Force
- Twelfth Air Force
- Thirteenth Air Force
- Fourteenth Air Force
- Fifteenth Air Force
- Twentieth Air Force
- Air Transport Command

== See also ==
- Military history of the United States during World War II
- United States in World War II
