= USS Trenton (CL-11) =

Omaha-class light cruiser

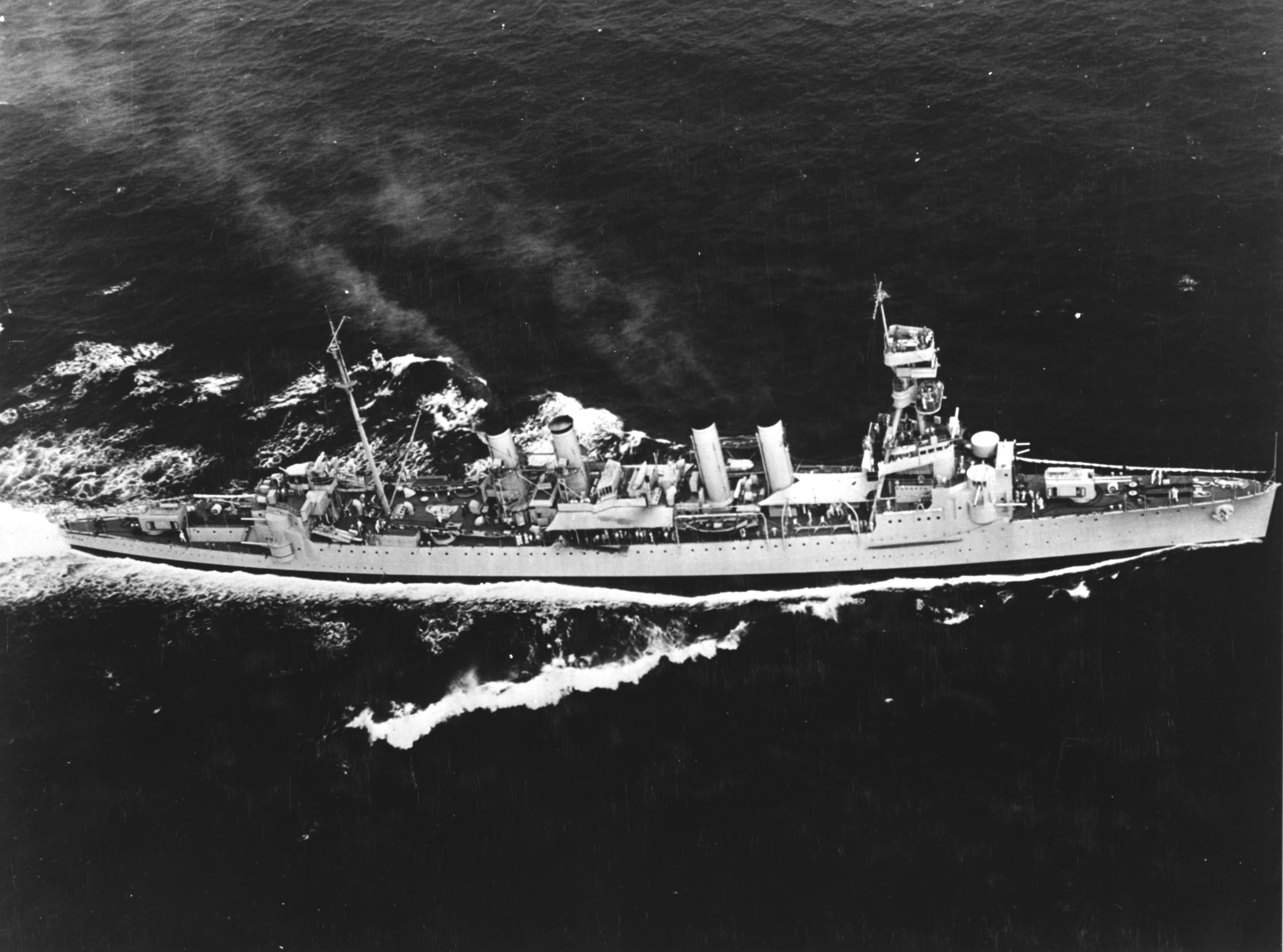
- USS Trenton (CL-11) in 1935.

History

United States
- Name: Trenton
- Namesake: City of Trenton, New Jersey
- Ordered: 1 July 1918
- Awarded: 24 January 1919
- Builder: William Cramp & Sons, Philadelphia
- Yard number: 501
- Laid down: 18 August 1920
- Launched: 16 April 1923
- Sponsored by: Miss Katherine E. Donnelly
- Completed: 1 October 1921
- Commissioned: 19 April 1924
- Decommissioned: 20 December 1945
- Stricken: 21 January 1946
- Identification: Hull symbol: CL-11; Code letters: NISR
- Honors and awards: 1 × battle star
- Fate: Sold for scrapping, 29 December 1946; Scrapped at Baltimore 1947

General characteristics (as built)
- Class & type: Omaha-class light cruiser
- Displacement: 7,050 long tons (7,163 t) (standard); 9,508 long tons (9,661 t) (loaded)
- Length: 555 ft 6 in (169.32 m) oa; 550 ft (170 m) pp
- Beam: 55 ft (17 m)
- Draft: 14 ft 3 in (4.34 m) (mean)
- Installed power: 12 × White-Forster boilers; 90,000 ihp (67,000 kW) (Estimated power produced on trials)
- Propulsion: 4 × Parsons steam turbines; 4 × screws
- Speed: 35 knots (65 km/h; 40 mph); 33.7 knots (62.4 km/h; 38.8 mph) (Estimated speed on Trial)
- Crew: 29 officers 429 enlisted (peace time)
- Armament: 2 × twin 6 in (150 mm)/53 caliber guns; 8 × single 6 in/53 caliber guns; 4 × 3 in (76 mm)/50 caliber guns anti-aircraft; 2 × triple 21 in (533 mm) torpedo tubes; 2 × twin 21 in torpedo tubes; 224 × mines (removed soon after completion)
- Armor: Belt: 3 in (76 mm); Deck: 1 1/2 in (38 mm); Conning Tower: 1 1/2 in; Bulkheads: 1 1/2-3 in
- Aircraft carried: 2 × Curtiss SOC Seagulls and later 2 x Vought OS2U Kingfishers
- Aviation facilities: 2 × Amidship catapults; crane

General characteristics (1945)
- Armament: 2 × twin 6 in/53 caliber; 6 × single 6 in/53 caliber; 8 × 3 in/50 caliber anti-aircraft guns; 2 × triple 21 in torpedo tubes; 3 × twin 40 mm (1.6 in) Bofors guns; 12 × single 20 mm (0.79 in) Oerlikon cannons

USS Trenton (CL-11) was an Omaha-class light cruiser, originally classified as a scout cruiser, of the United States Navy. She was the second Navy ship named for the city of Trenton, New Jersey. She spent most of her pre-war career moving between the Atlantic and the Pacific. Trenton joined the Special Service Squadron in 1934, for a good-will tour of Latin America. In May 1939, she would join Squadron 40-T in protecting American interests during the Spanish Civil War and didn't return to the US until July 1940, when she carried the royal family of Luxembourg, fleeing from the Nazi occupation of their country.

== Built in Philadelphia, Pennsylvania ==
Trenton was authorized on 1 July 1918, and assigned to William Cramp & Sons, Philadelphia on 24 January 1919. She was laid down on 18 August 1920, and launched on 16 April 1923, sponsored by Miss Katherine E. Donnelly, daughter of the mayor of Trenton at the time, Frederick W. Donnelly. Trenton was commissioned on 3 November 1923, with future Admiral, Captain Edward C. Kalbfus in command.

Trenton was 550 feet (170 metres) long at the waterline with an overall length of 555 feet 6 inches (169.32 metres), her beam was 55 feet 4 inches (16.87 metres) and a mean draft of 13 feet 6 inches (4.11 metres). Her standard displacement was 7,050 long tons (7,160 t) and 9,508 long tons (9,661 t) at full load. Her crew, during peace time, consisted of 29 officers and 429 enlisted men.

Trenton was powered by four Parsons steam turbines geared steam turbines, each driving one screw, using steam generated by 12 White-Forster boilers. The engines were designed to produce 90,000 indicated horsepower (67,000 kW) and reach a top speed of 35 knots (65 km/h; 40 mph). She was designed to provide a range of 10,000 nautical miles (19,000 km; 12,000 mi) at a speed of 10 knots (19 km/h; 12 mph), but was only capable of 8,460 nautical miles (15,670 km; 9,740 mi) at a speed of 10 knots (19 km/h; 12 mph)

Trenton's main armament went through many changes while she was being designed. Originally she was to mount ten 6 in (150 mm)/53 caliber guns; two on either side at the waist, with the remaining eight mounted in tiered casemates on either side of the fore and aft superstructures. After America's entry into World War I the US Navy worked alongside the Royal Navy and it was decided to mount four 6-in/53 caliber guns in two twin gun turrets fore and aft and keep the eight guns in the tiered casemates so that she would have an eight gun broadside and, due to limited arcs of fire from the casemate guns, four to six guns firing fore or aft. Her secondary armament consisted of two 3 in (76 mm)/50 caliber anti-aircraft guns in single mounts. Trenton was initially built with the capacity to carry 224 mines, but these were removed early in her career to make way for more crew accommodations. She also carried two triple and two twin, above-water, torpedo tube mounts for 21 in (530 mm) torpedoes. The triple mounts were fitted on either side of the upper deck, aft of the aircraft catapults, and the twin mounts were one deck lower on either side, covered by hatches in the side of the hull.

The ship lacked a full-length waterline armor belt. The sides of her boiler and engine rooms and steering gear were protected by 3 inches (76 mm) of armor. The transverse bulkheads at the end of her machinery rooms were 1.5 inches (38 mm) thick forward and three inches thick aft. The deck over the machinery spaces and steering gear had a thickness of 1.5 inches. The gun turrets were not armored and only provided protection against muzzle blast and the conning tower had 1.5 inches of armor. Trenton carried two floatplanes aboard that were stored on the two catapults. Initially these were probably Vought VE-9s until the early 1930s when the ship may have operated OJ-2 until 1935 and Curtiss SOC Seagulls until 1940 when Vought OS2U Kingfishers were used on ships without hangars.

=== Armament changes ===
During her career Trenton went through several armament changes, some of these changes were save weight, but others were to increase her AA armament. The lower torpedo tube mounts proved to be very wet and were removed, and the openings plated over, before the start of World War II. Another change made before the war was to increase the 3-inch guns to eight, all mounted in the ship's waist. After 1940, the lower aft 6 in (150 mm) guns were removed and the casemates plated over for the same reason as the lower torpedo mounts. The ship's anti-aircraft armament were augmented by three twin 40 mm (1.6 in) Bofors guns along with 12 20 mm (0.79 in) Oerlikon cannons by the end of the war.

== Inter-war period ==
On 24 May 1924, she stood out of New York Harbor for her shakedown cruise in the Mediterranean Sea. On 14 August 1924, while in transit from Port Said, Egypt, to Aden, Arabia, she was ordered to Bushire, Persia. She arrived on 25 August, and took on board the remains of Vice Consul Robert Imbrie. She received and returned the gun salute to the late vice consul and departed the same day. Following stops at Suez and Port Said, Egypt; and at Villefranche, France; Trenton arrived at the Washington Navy Yard on 29 September 1924.

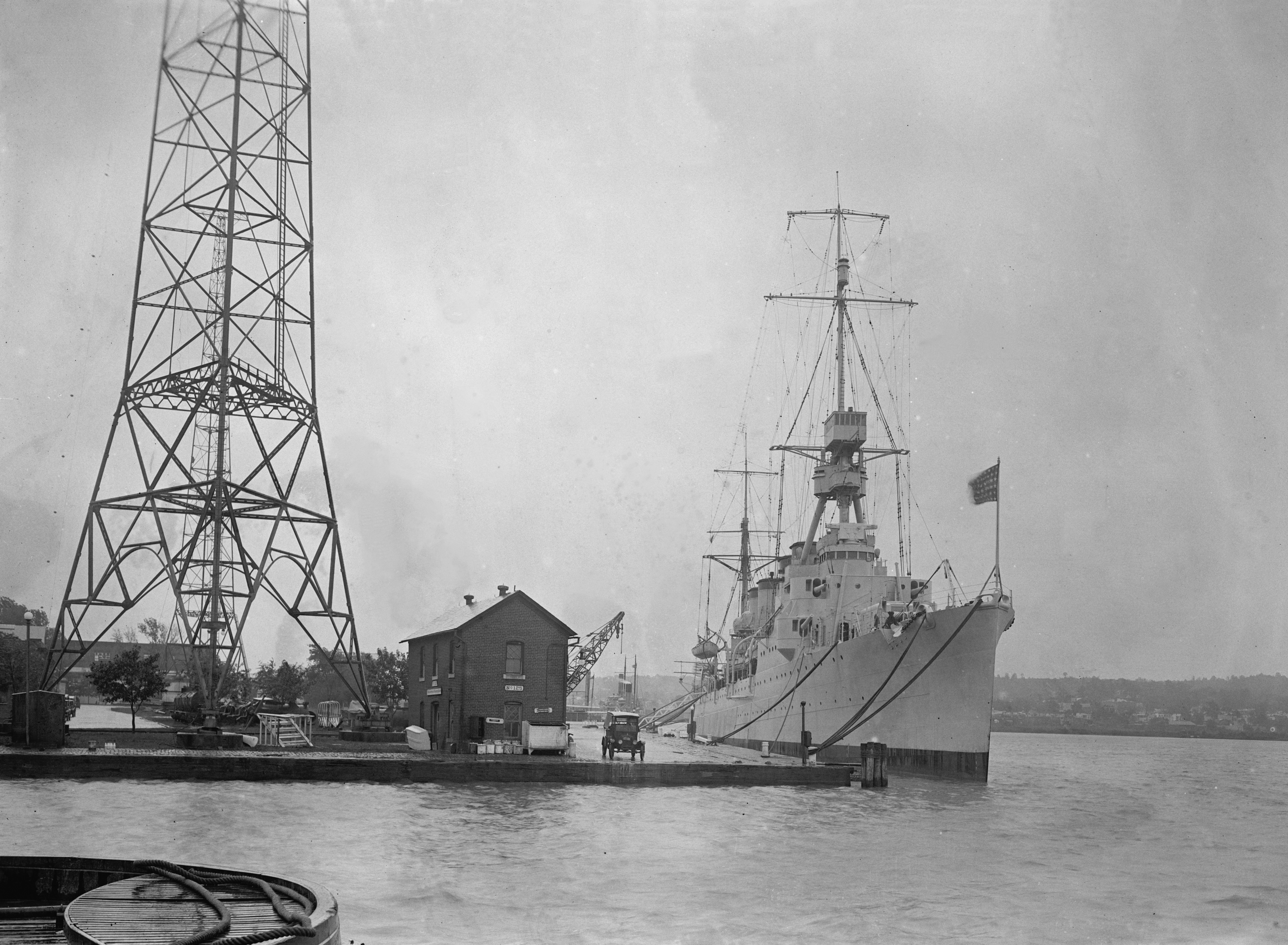
Trenton returning from her shakedown cruise in 1924.

On 20 October 1924, while Trenton was conducting gunnery drills off the Virginia Capes near Norfolk, powder bags in her forward turret exploded, killing or injuring every member of the gun crew. During the ensuing fire, Ensign Henry Clay Drexler and Boatswain's Mate First Class George Cholister attempted to dump powder charges into the immersion tank before they detonated but failed. Ensign Drexler was killed when the charge exploded, and Boatswain's Mate Cholister was overcome by fire and fumes before he could reach his objective. He died the following day. Both men were awarded the Medal of Honor, posthumously.

Later that month, Trenton steamed north to join in the futile search for lost American motor yacht Leif Ericsson, which went missing with three aboard while en route from Bergen, Norway, to the United States. The search was suspended on 12 November as further attempts to locate it were deemed "futile" in light of the heavy weather in the region during the two months since the vessel was last heard from. Lost were William W. Nutting and Arthur Hildebrand, American writers, and Eric Todahal, a painter. Following that mission, the light cruiser operated along the United States East Coast until 3 February 1925, when she departed Philadelphia to join the rest of the Scouting Fleet off Guantánamo Bay, Cuba. After gunnery exercises, the fleet headed for the Panama Canal and transited it in mid-month. On 23 February, the combined forces of the Battle Fleet and Scouting Fleet departed Balboa, Panama, and steamed north to San Diego. En route, the ships participated in a fleet problem, then assembled in the San Diego-San Francisco area. On 15 April, the US Fleet put to sea for the Central Pacific and conducted another battle problem en route — this one designed to test fully the defenses of the Hawaiian Islands. After reaching Hawaiian waters, the Fleet as a whole conducted tactical exercises there until 7 June, when most of the Scouting Fleet headed back toward the Atlantic.

Trenton — in Cruiser Division 2 (CruDiv 2) — sortied with the Battle Fleet on 1 July, for a cruise to the South Pacific and visits to Australia and New Zealand. After stopping at Samoa, the ships visited the ports of Melbourne, Wellington, Sydney, Auckland, Dunedin, and Lyttelton. Late in August, CruDiv 2 turned homeward and steamed via the Marquesas and Galapagos Islands and the Panama Canal to rejoin the Scouting Fleet near Guantanamo Bay on 4 October. After gunnery practice, Trenton returned to Philadelphia on 9 November.

In January 1926, Trenton joined the other units of the Scouting Fleet and returned to Guantanamo for gunnery drills and tactical exercises. On 1 February, she departed Cuba with them, bound for Panama. For the next six weeks, she participated in combined maneuvers with units of both Battle Fleet and Scouting Fleet. In mid-March, the units of the Scouting Fleet returned to their home yards for repairs before leaving for summer training cruises with naval reservists and tactical exercises in the area around Narragansett Bay. In mid-September, she returned to Guantanamo Bay for winter maneuvers.

Trenton participated in maneuvers until just before 25 December, when the units of the Scouting Fleet dispersed to their home ports for the holidays. Early in 1927, she joined the Scouting Fleet in combined maneuvers with the Battle Fleet near Guantanamo Bay. In May, Trenton was called upon to transport Colonel Henry L. Stimson, a special observer in Nicaragua during a period of internal disorder. She embarked Colonel and Mrs. Stimson at Corinto and carried them back to Hampton Roads. Following a review by President Coolidge in June, the various units of the two fleets departed Hampton Roads for their normal summer routines. CruDiv 2, of which Trenton was flagship, operated off Narragansett Bay; then, in the fall, rejoined the Scouting Fleet for gunnery and tactical exercises along the east coast between Chesapeake Bay and Charleston, South Carolina.

In January 1928, Trenton and her division embarked Marines at Charleston and returned to Nicaragua, where they landed to assist in supervising the elections which resulted from Colonel Stimson's visit. She and her sister-ships rejoined the Scouting Fleet at Guantanamo and resumed maneuvers. On 9 March, CruDiv 2 parted company with the Scouting Fleet. The four light cruisers rendezvoused with the Battle Fleet off the California coast and headed for Hawaii, conducting drills en route. After exercises in the Hawaiian Islands, Trenton and Memphis cleared Honolulu to relieve CruDiv 3 on the Asiatic Station. During that tour of duty, she entertained Colonel Stimson, this time as Governor General of the Philippines. She participated in joint Army-Navy maneuvers in the Philippines and patrolled the northern Chinese coast. By late March 1929, Trenton was stationed at Zhifu to prevent a possible outbreak of anti-foreigner pogroms due to the Warlord Rebellion in northeastern Shandong. On one occasion, she put a landing force ashore at Zhifu.

In May 1929, Trenton's division was detached from the Asiatic Fleet, and she steamed back to the United States along with Memphis and Milwaukee. The light cruiser was overhauled at Philadelphia in the latter part of 1929, and then rejoined the Scouting Fleet. For the next four years, Trenton resumed the Scouting Fleet schedule of winter maneuvers in the Caribbean followed by summer exercises off the New England coast. Periodically, however, she was ordered to the Isthmian coast to bolster the Special Service Squadron during periods of extreme political unrest in one or more of the republics of Central America.

In the spring of 1933, Trenton moved to the Pacific and became flagship of the Battle Force cruisers. She operated in the eastern Pacific until September 1934. At that time, the ship returned to the Atlantic side of the Panama Canal to cruise with the Special Service Squadron. Over the next 15 months, Trenton visited ports in the Caribbean, in Central America, and South America as the squadron conducted a good-will cruise to Latin America. In January 1936, she retransited the canal and, after an overhaul at the Mare Island Navy Yard, rejoined the Battle Force until late in the spring of 1939. During that period, she made her second cruise to Australia in the winter of 1937 and 1938, for the sesquicentennial of the first colonization of that continent.

In May 1939, she returned to the Atlantic and, after a stop at Hampton Roads, got underway on 3 June for Europe. There she joined Squadron 40-T, a small American naval force which had been organized in 1936, to evacuate United States citizens from Spain and to protect American interests during the Spanish Civil War. Trenton patrolled the western Mediterranean and waters off the coast of the Iberian Peninsula until mid-July 1940, when she returned to the United States. During her homeward voyage, the light cruiser carried Luxembourg's royal family then in flight from Nazi aggression.

== World War II ==
In November, Trenton reentered the Pacific and rejoined the Battle Force, becoming an element of CruDiv 3. From 1941 to mid-1944, the ship served with the Southeast Pacific Force. At the time of America's entry into the war early in December 1941, she was moored at Balboa, Canal Zone. During the early part of 1942, Trenton escorted convoys to Bora Bora in the Society Islands where the Navy was constructing a fuel depot. From mid-1942 to mid-1944, she patrolled the western coast of South America between the Canal Zone and the Strait of Magellan. During one of these sweeps, on 29 August 1943, while patrolling some 150 nm southeast of Tonga, Trenton received a radar contact which lasted for 15 minutes, but the American commander disregarded it as a regular merchant vessel. They actually missed the German raider Michel, which on 11 September intercepted and sank the Norwegian tanker India with all hands.

On 18 July 1944, Trenton headed north for duty in waters surrounding the Aleutians. After stopping for a time at San Francisco, she arrived at Adak, Alaska, on 2 September. A month later, she shifted bases to Attu. In October, Trenton joined Richmond and nine destroyers in two sweeps of the northern Kuril Islands — the first from 16 to 19 October, and the second from 22 to 29 October — as a diversion during the invasion of Leyte. She returned to the Kurils again on 3 January 1945, to bombard enemy installations on Paramushiru Island, then resumed Alaskan patrols.

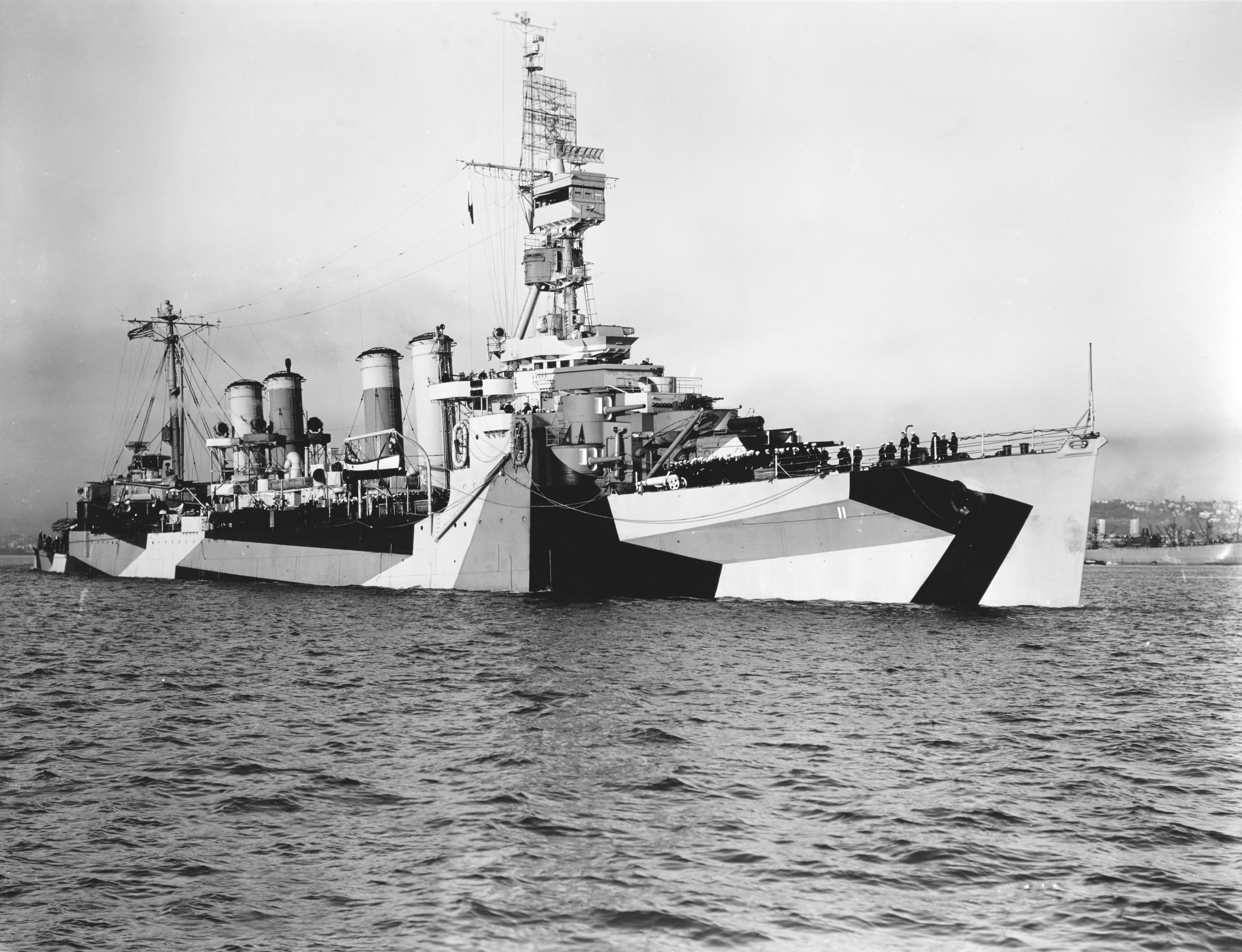
Trenton after her last overhaul in August 1944.

For the remainder of the war, Trenton patrolled the waters off Alaska and the Aleutian Islands and made periodic sweeps of the Kuril Islands. On 18 February, she returned to Paramushiru to pound shore installations. A month later, she bombarded Matsuwa. On 10 June, the light cruiser shelled Matsuwa once more and made an anti-shipping sweep before conducting another bombardment during the evening hours of 11 June. From 23 to 25 June, Trenton, conducted her last offensive operation of the war, an anti-shipping sweep of the central Kuriles. Task Force 94 (TF 94) split into two units. Trenton encountered no enemy shipping, but the other unit sank five ships of a small convoy.

Not long after that operation, the light cruiser steamed south for yard work. She reached San Francisco on 1 August, and the end of the war found her at Mare Island Navy Yard awaiting inactivation overhaul. Early in November, she headed south to Panama. Trenton transited the canal on 18 November, arrived at Philadelphia a week later, and was placed out of commission there on 20 December. Her name was struck from the Navy list on 21 January 1946. On 29 December, she was delivered to her purchaser, the Patapsco Scrap Co. of Bethlehem, Pa., for scrapping.

== Awards ==
- Asiatic-Pacific Campaign Medal with one battle star for World War II service

Based on the information in the article Trenton also earned:

- American Defense Service Medal with fleet clasp
- American Campaign Medal
- World War II Victory Medal
