= Johann Heinrich Walch =

German conductor, chamber musician and choral master

Johann Heinrich Walch (1776–1855), was a German conductor, chamber musician and choral master at the court of the Dukes of Saxe-Coburg.

== Life ==
Walch acted in various capacities for Augustus, Duke of Saxe-Gotha-Altenburg, and after his death for Ernest I, Duke of Saxe-Coburg and Gotha, the father of Queen Victoria's husband Albert, Prince Consort.

== Works ==
Walch composed many well-known marches, some of which have long been wrongly attributed to Beethoven and the Prince Consort, Albert of Saxe-Coburg-Gotha. Many marches supposedly written by Prince Albert for cavalry regiments are actually by Walch, including the regimental quick march of the Somerset Light Infantry.

Name	Comments	Audio example
Pariser Einzugsmarsch	At the end of the War of the Sixth Coalition, after the first major defeat of Napoleon, the allied forces of Austria, Prussia, and Russia, marched into Paris on 31 March 1814 to the tune of the "Pariser Einzugsmarsch". The music was also used triumphally at the climax of the 1940 German victory parade through occupied Paris. Although credited initially to Beethoven, Walch is the composer.	Video on YouTube
Beethoven Funeral March No 1	The famous "Beethoven Funeral March Number 1" was for a long time wrongly attributed to Beethoven, and catalogued as WoO (work without opus number), Anh. 13, but was in fact composed by Walch. In the United Kingdom, the march is traditionally played at the National Service of Remembrance in London on Remembrance Sunday each year on the Sunday nearest to 11 November. It is played after the Last Post, during the Wreath Laying Ceremony. The march was also played during the funerals of King Edward VII (1910), of Queen Elizabeth The Queen Mother (2002), of former Prime Minister Margaret Thatcher (2013, during the procession to St Paul's Cathedral), of Prince Philip, Duke of Edinburgh (2021, during the procession to St George's Chapel), and of Queen Elizabeth II (2022, during the procession to the lying in state at Westminster). In the United States, the march was played during the funeral procession from the Capitol to the White House at the state funeral of President Kennedy on November 25, 1963. In Singapore, the march was played by the Singapore Armed Forces Band on 25 March 2015, during the foot procession from the Istana to the lying in state of Lee Kuan Yew, Singapore's first Prime Minister, at the Parliament House of Singapore.	Video on YouTube
Beethoven Funeral March No 2	By Walch, also wrongly attributed to Beethoven. Played e.g. during the state funeral of Queen Elizabeth II.	Video on YouTube
Beethoven Funeral March No 3	Set in Bb minor. By Walch, also wrongly attributed to Beethoven. Played e.g. during the state funeral of Queen Elizabeth II.	Video on YouTube

== Sources ==
- Werner Probst, "Johann Heinrich Walch komponierte den bekannten Trauermarsch von Beethoven" in Mitteilungsblatt des Arbeitskreises Militärmusik (German Society for Military Studies, 21st Year, No. 2, June 1998), pp. 98–105
