= Moment of silence =

Death custom

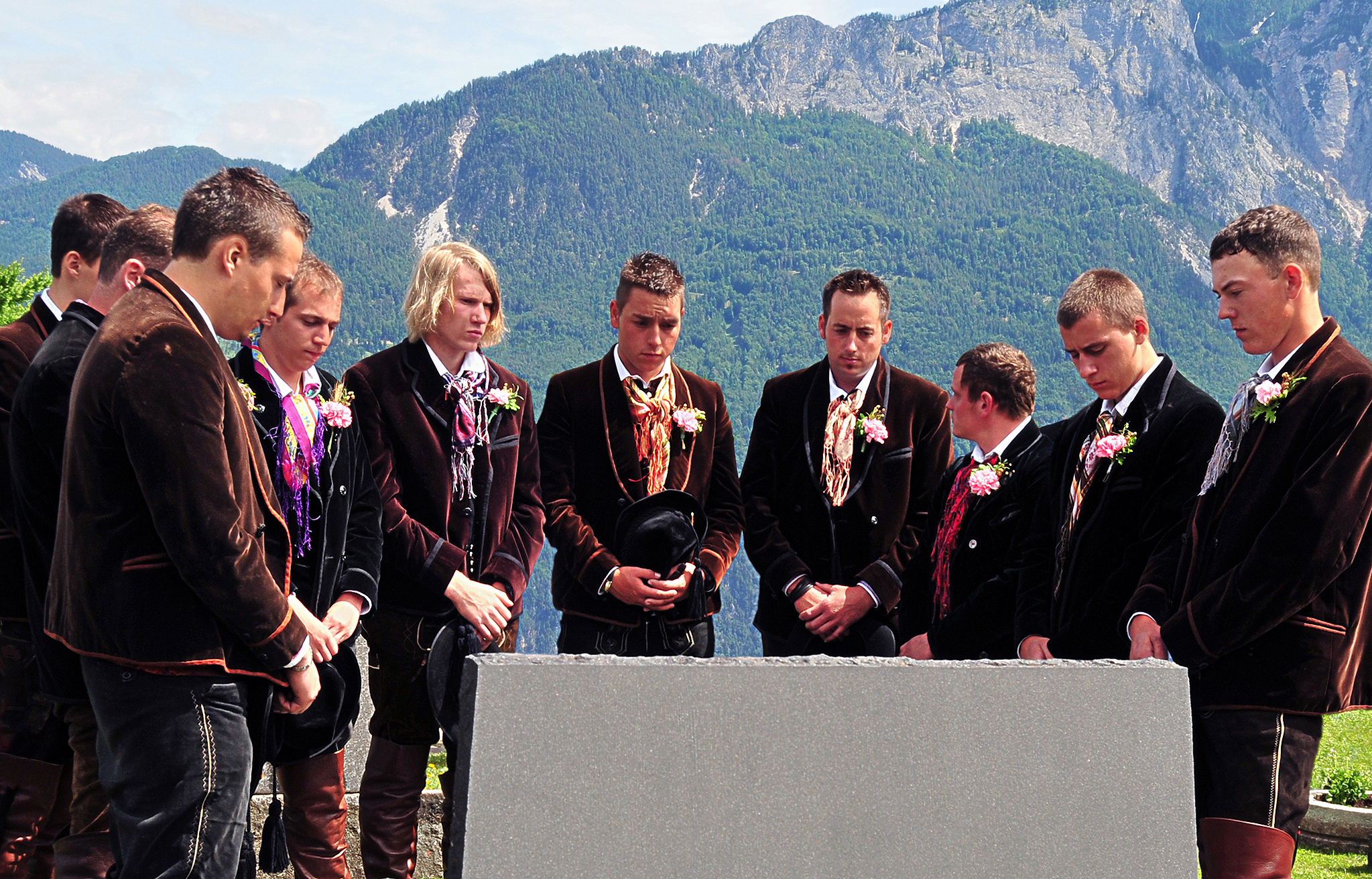
A moment of silence observed by people wearing the traditional folk regalia of the Gail Valley in Austria

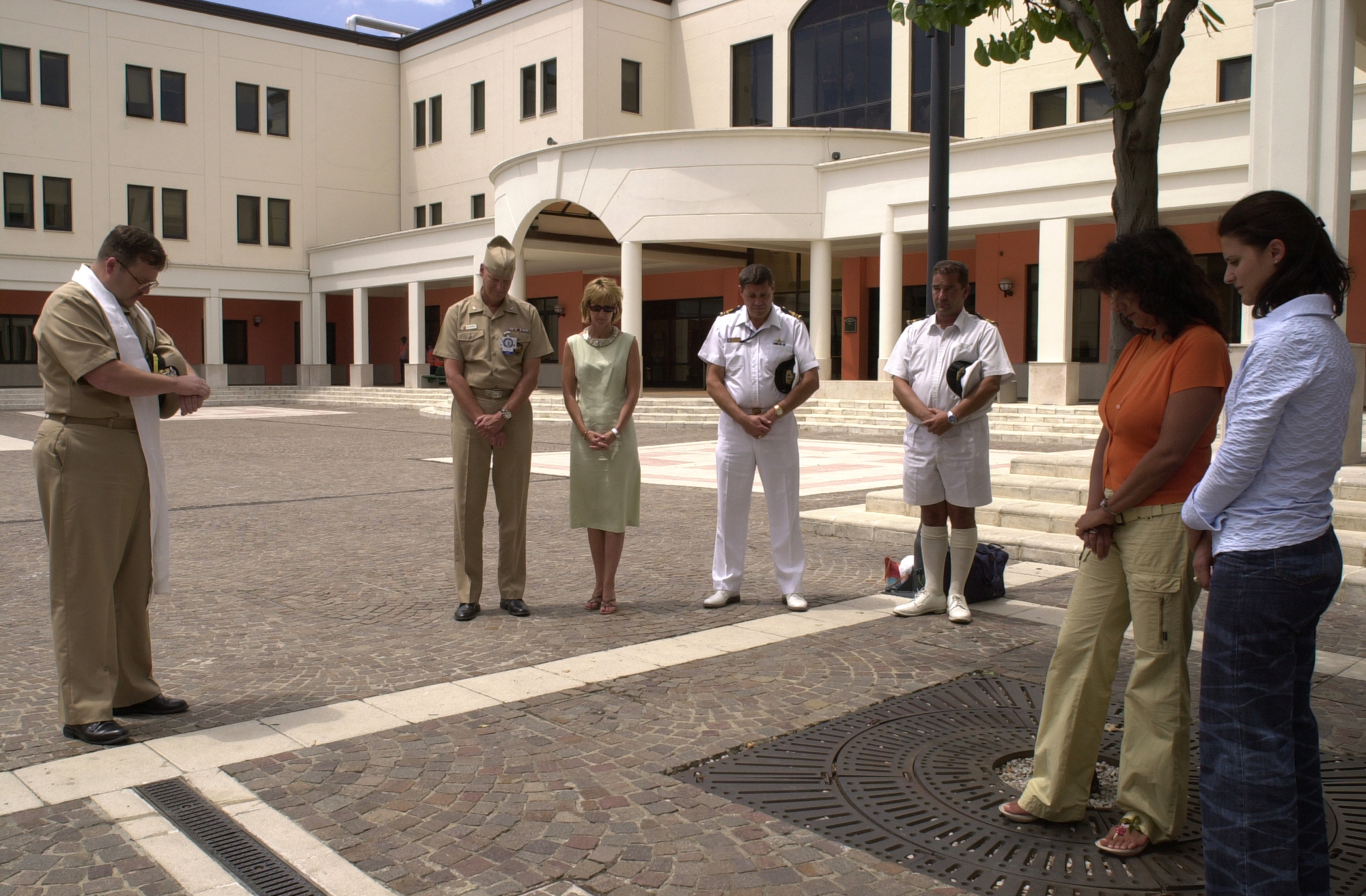
Naples, Italy (14 July 2005) – Navy Chaplain Dave McBeth, left, leads an informal gathering of personnel aboard Naval Support Activity (NSA) Naples during a Europe-wide coordinated two-minute moment of silence held throughout the European Union in relation to the 2005 London Bombings.

A moment of silence (also referred to as a minute's silence or a one-minute silence) is a period of silent contemplation, prayer, reflection, or meditation. Similar to flying a flag at half-mast, a moment of silence is often a gesture of respect, particularly in mourning for those who have died recently, or as part of a tragic historical event, such as Remembrance Day.

A minute, or 60 seconds, is a common length of time for the memorialization, though organizers may choose other periods of time, normally connected in some way with the event being commemorated (there might be a minute given for every death commemorated, for example). During a moment of silence, its participants may typically bow their heads, remove their hats, and refrain from speaking, or moving, for the duration of it.

== Origins ==
The first recorded instance of an official moment of silence dedicated to a dead person took place in Portugal on 13 February 1912. The Portuguese Senate dedicated 10 minutes of silence to José Maria da Silva Paranhos Júnior, baron of Rio Branco, Brazil, and Minister of the Exterior of the Brazilian government, who had died three days earlier on 10 February. The moment of silence was registered in the Senate's records of that day. In the same year, large parts of the United States kept a ceremonial silence to honour the dead of the Maine and the Titanic.

The first person to publicly suggest a moment's silence as a vessel to hold the sorrow and loss of war was either by South African author and politician James Percy FitzPatrick or by Australian journalist Edward George Honey, himself a World War I veteran. While the Australian government claims Honey was the originator of the idea as it pertained to war remembrance, there are no primary sources to conclusively confirm a date in which Honey's proposal predated FitzPatrick's. Nevertheless, each person's idea was conceived less than a year from each other, so it's possible the shared idea was a matter of parallel thinking.

Eric Harding's booklet written in support of the monument to Honey erected in 1965 acknowledges that other silences had been held before (upon the death of King Edward, the silences in South Africa "when the war was going badly for the Allies", ceremonies in Australia for lost miners, in the US when the Maine was sunk, amongst others), but in his words "the originality of Honey's suggestion is based on the fact that this was the first time in history that a victory had been celebrated as a tribute to those who sacrificed their lives and their health to make the victory possible". (Note: This is somewhat at odds with the fact that the Two Minute Silent Pause of Remembrance for the war dead had continued to be held daily in Cape Town until May 1919.) Harding also acknowledges that, despite extensive research, no evidence of Honey's attendance at any rehearsal at Buckingham Palace, nor any record of an official communication mentioning Honey's letter having played a part in the adoption of the remembrance tradition, could be found, and that the only "proof" was that the letter preceded the formal approach to the King by several months. However he also writes that "Sir Percy's right to recognition for bringing the matter to official notice does not detract in any way from Honey's right to recognition as the first to make the suggestion."

According to an Australian War Memorial article, Honey attended a trial of the event with the Grenadier guards at Buckingham Palace, as did FitzPatrick (although it was not known whether they ever actually met or discussed their ideas). However, Honey's wife (whom he called "Millie"), as reported by her friend M.F. Orford's 1961 article, states that he "never went out into the streets near the crowds at any time during the observance of the Silence...", and they only heard about the observance of the first Two Minutes' Silence when the order was announced by Buckingham Palace.

== Examples ==
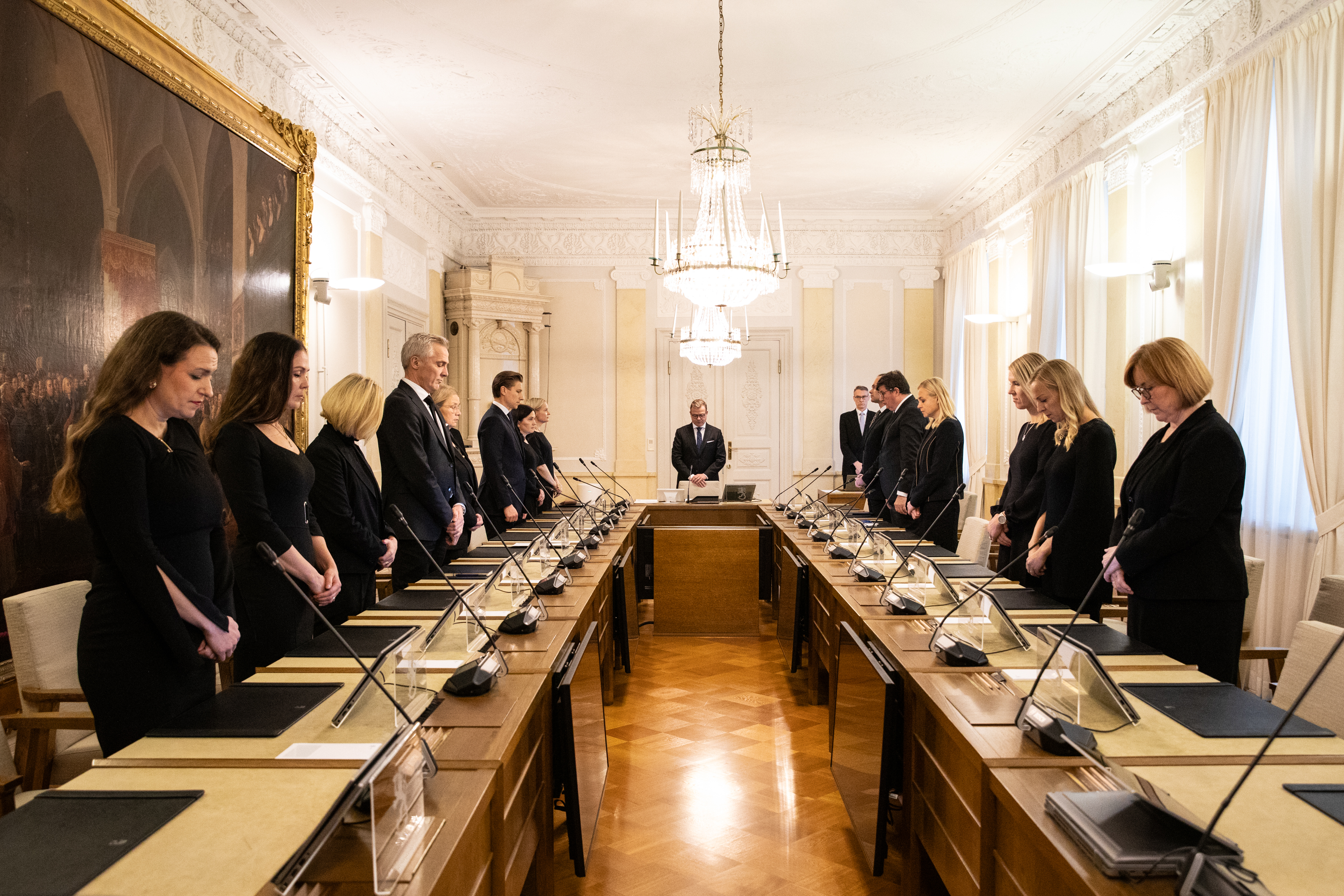
The Finnish cabinet holds a minute of silence following the death of former Finnish President Martti Ahtisaari on 18 October 2023.

Many people in the Commonwealth of Nations observe the two-minute silence at 11:00 local time on 11 November each year (Armistice Day) to remember sacrifices of members of the armed forces and of civilians in times of war. In addition, a two minutes of silence is also observed in the United Kingdom on the second Sunday of November which is more recently known as Remembrance Sunday and is televised with a close up image of the Big Ben clock chiming 11 and the buglers sounding the Last Post at 11:02 UTC.

In Australia and New Zealand, the ceremony was quickly adopted for commemorations held at dawn on ANZAC Day, 25 April. This moment of silence is held to remember the service men and women who died in WWI and subsequent conflicts.

In Israel, moments of silence are held in memory of the victims of the Holocaust on Yom HaShoah and in memory of fallen soldiers and of terrorist victims on the day before Israel's independence day.

In Japan, a minute of silence is observed (and televised nationally) at ceremonies every August in both Hiroshima and Nagasaki cities at the same time as the atomic bombings.

Moments of silence are often observed prior to other events including gatherings such as sports matches, with reasons for silences ranging from national and international tragedies or to the death of individuals connected to a group.

In recent years, in the United Kingdom and Israel, the minute's silence at sports events has been replaced by a minute of applause.

In Ukraine, a minute of silence is observed every day at 09:00 EET to commemorate the victims of Russia's invasion of the country. It was officially designated by a presidential decree on 16 March 2023.

Mengheningkan Cipta
English: 'Moment of Silence'
- National moment of silence anthem of Indonesia
- Also known as: Mengheningkan Tjipta(old spelling)
- Lyrics: Truno Prawit, c. 1950s
- Music: Truno Prawit
- Adopted: c. 10 December 1958

In Indonesia, moment of silence is called Mengheningkan Cipta and is always accompanied with a rendition of a hymn of the same name, composed by Surakarta Sunanate musician Truno Prawit. This tradition was said to originate at the behest of Sukarno in the 1958 Heroes' Day ceremony in Ambon.

== Silent prayer ==
Silent prayer as a mode of prayer has antecedents in the Bible, and Jews have been praying silently for thousands of years.

Quakers have practiced silent worship for more than 300 years, believing that all people have the light of God within and that no priestly intercession is needed for the divine to speak. Silent worship in Quaker meetings is seldom entirely silent, and individuals speak as they are moved to by the spirit.

The larger society perhaps adopted the practice of silent prayer in public gatherings because silence contains no statements or assumptions concerning beliefs. Since it requires no understanding of language to interpret, it is more easily accepted and used than a spoken prayer or observance when persons of different religious and cultural backgrounds participate together. Today, the moment of silence is used to avoid offending people with religious pontification and to empower individuals to interpret the moment as they wish.

In the US colonial period, Pennsylvania Quakers did not worship together with non-Quakers, except those who might become converts. They were separatists and did not pray in ecumenical gatherings or in service to institutions.

In recent times the co-opting of Quaker-style silence for non-sectarian and non-controversial public observances has led to its almost universal use in the English-speaking world as well as in other plural societies. This is also the case within many secular institutions where diverse groups are expected to participate but not necessarily share beliefs - such as in government, schools, commercial companies and the military.

The use of a moment of silence to memorialize fallen soldiers or to allow private reflection in public schools, for example, was not introduced by Quakers themselves.

== In United States schools ==
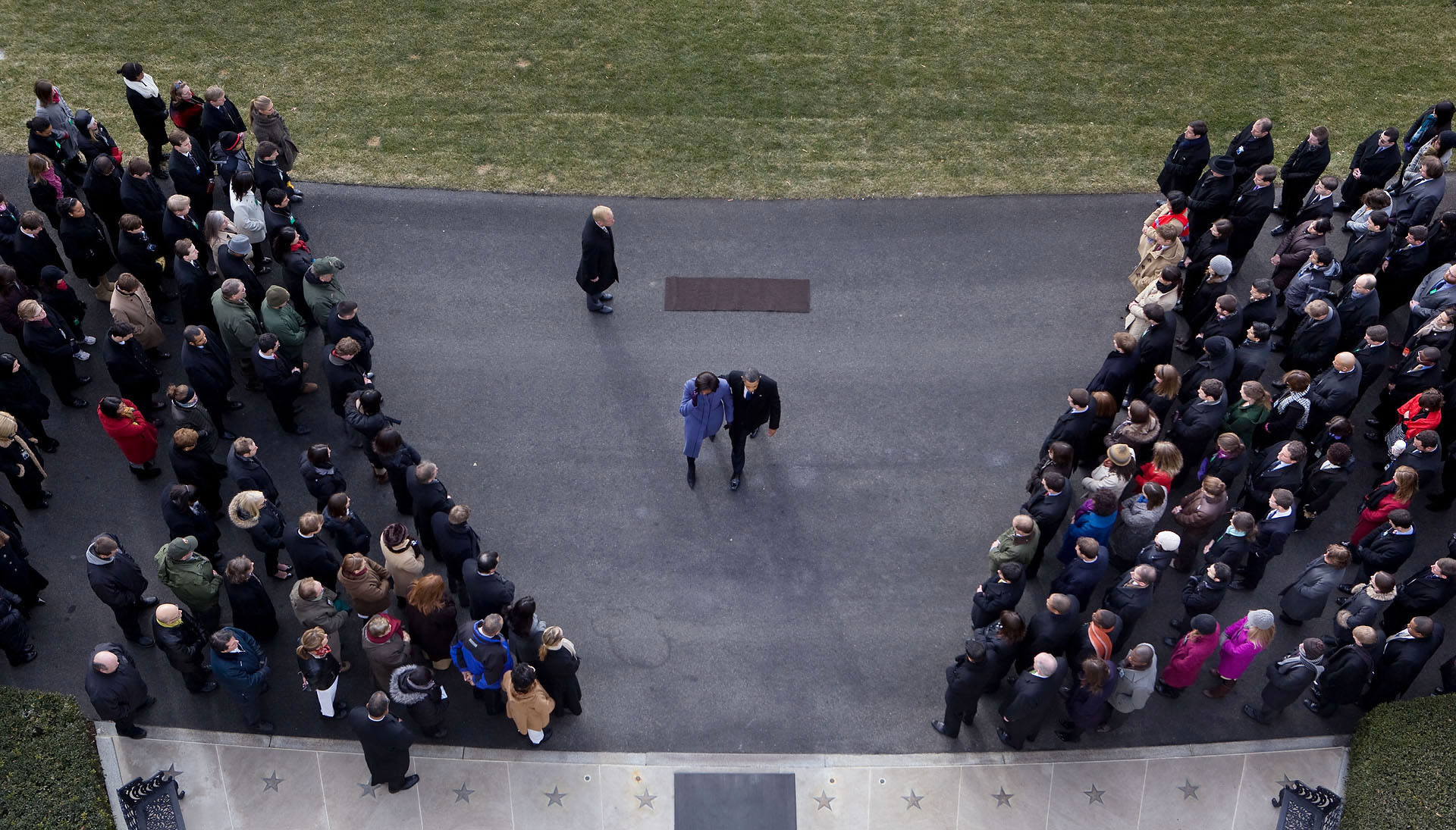
First Lady Michelle Obama and President Barack Obama return to the White House after leading a moment of silence for the victims of the 2011 Tucson shooting.

The U.S. Supreme Court ruled in 1962 that official organization, sponsorship, or endorsement of school prayer in public schools is forbidden by the First Amendment to the United States Constitution. Teachers and school officials may not lead classes in prayer, but prayer is permitted at voluntary religious clubs, and students are not prohibited from praying themselves. Other rulings have forbidden public, organized prayer at school assemblies, sporting events, and similar school-sponsored activities.

Public moments of silence in the United States both arise from and contribute to this debate over prayer and the separation of church and state. A moment of silence lacks any specific religious formulation, and therefore it has been presented as a way of creating reflection and respect without endorsing any particular religion.

President Ronald Reagan was a supporter of a moment of silence in American schools. In 1981, Reagan formally proposed a constitutional amendment permitting organized prayer in public schools. In his 1984 state of the union address, Reagan asked Congress, who begin their day with an invocation: "If you can begin your day with a member of the clergy standing right here leading you in prayer, then why can't freedom to acknowledge God be enjoyed again by children in every schoolroom across this land?" Colin Powell, a longtime advocate, had recommended a simple moment of silence at the start of each school day. Further, he stated that students could use this interval to pray, meditate, contemplate or study.

Rabbi Menachem Mendel Schneerson, the Lubavitcher Rebbe, advocated a daily moment of silence in public schools as part of moral education.

However, critics often view the moment of silence as publicly endorsing prayer "in disguise". This issue has been especially raised by atheist groups and advocates, who argue that no non-religious purpose is served by designating an official moment of silence. Moments of silence point to the tension in the U.S. Constitution and society between accommodation and endorsement. Accommodation of religion is to ensure an environment where a person or student can practice their religion. A question with "moments of silence" laws is whether accommodation was already achieved by the fact that a student can pray or meditate on his/her own without an official moment of silence. Barry Lynn of Americans United for Separation of Church and State said, on a "moment of silence" case, "Students were already allowed to pray, meditate, or reflect under the statute before it was amended. The addition of the word 'pray' where it wasn't needed clearly shows that legislators intended to promote religion, and that's not their job." Courts have stated on these moments of silence cases that a secular purpose is necessary and according to Wallace v. Jaffree, a "statute must be invalidated if it is entirely motivated by a purpose to advance religion."

Although since 1976 the state Virginia law permitted school districts to implement 60 seconds of silence at the start of each school day, in 1985, the U.S. Supreme Court ruled that an Alabama "moment of silence or voluntary prayer" law was unconstitutional, in the case Wallace v. Jaffree. In April 2000, a new law came into being; requiring all Virginian public school students to observe a moment of silence. Also, in 2005, a law was passed in Indiana requiring all public schools to give students a chance to say the Pledge of Allegiance and observe a moment of silence every day. In October 2007, Illinois enacted legislation to require public schools to provide students with a moment of silence at the start of the school day, a statute that was challenged in Illinois state courts. According to the National Conference of State Legislatures, Alabama, Georgia, Louisiana, Massachusetts, Nevada, New Hampshire, Oklahoma, Rhode Island, South Carolina, Tennessee, Texas, and Virginia also require such moments of quiet in the classroom. In more than 20 other states, teachers are allowed to decide whether they want such a classroom time-out.

In October 2000, the U.S. District Judge Claude M. Hilton ruled that the "moment of silence" law was constitutional. Judge Hilton stated, "The court finds that the Commonwealth's daily observance of one minute of silence act is constitutional. The act was enacted for a secular purpose, does not advance or inhibit religion, nor is there excessive entanglement with religion... Students may think as they wish – and this thinking can be purely religious in nature or purely secular in nature. All that is required is that they sit silently." His ruling was upheld in the 4th circuit. Others argued that the law was not enacted for a secular purpose, pointing to statements made by supporters of the legislation. State Senator Charles R. Hawkins (R-Pennsylvania) stated the moment of silence is "a very small measure to address a very large problem." He also said, "Prayer is not a bad word in my vocabulary." Kent Willis, executive director of the ACLU of Virginia, stated lawmakers are "at the very least placing Virginia law right on the line of separation of church and state or they are crossing it . . . the state is playing with fire here."

The American Civil Liberties Union was opposed to a proposed constitutional amendment by Newt Gingrich in the early 1990s which would have set aside a voluntary moment of prayer during the school day, which was later independently described by President Bill Clinton as a "moment of silence".

== Association football ==
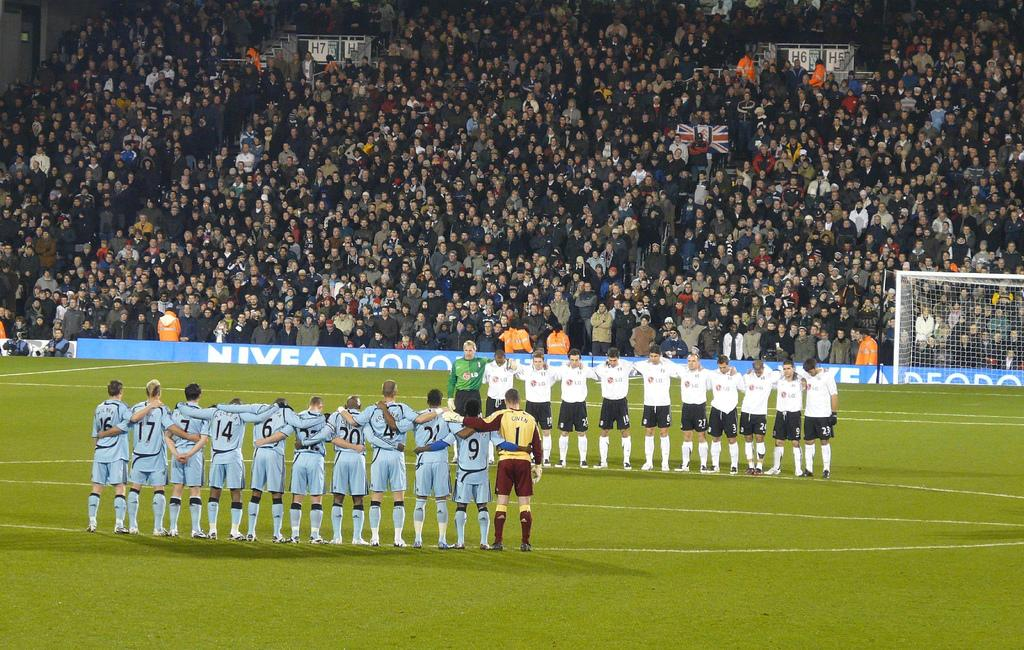
A minute of silence before a 2007–08 Premier League match between Fulham and Newcastle United following the death of footballer Jim Langley

When a terrorist attack occurs, association football federations can order minutes of silence for upcoming matches as a gesture of respect for victims who were killed.

In November 2016, LaMia Flight 2933, carrying the Chapecoense football club to the first leg of the 2016 Copa Sudamericana finals, crashed in Colombia, killing nearly all of its members. Most European football federations ordered a minute of silence following the crash. On the planned date of the final, a memorial was organised by Nacional and Medellín City Council to honor the deceased persons from the crash. About forty five thousand people were present inside the stadium. In January 2019, footballer Emiliano Sala was killed in a plane crash, and minutes of silence were subsequently observed before Premier League, Ligue 1 and European competitions matches.

== See also ==
- Remembrance Day – Day honouring military casualties of war
- Separation of church and state in the United States – Political principle in the United States
- Silent Minute – Historic movement in the United Kingdom
- Two-minute silence – Event held to remember those who died in conflict
- Vow of silence – Vow to maintain silence, usually for spirituality or protest
