= Kenneth Hands =

South African cricketer

Personal information
- Full name: Kenneth Charles Myburgh Hands
- Born: 22 March 1892; Stellenbosch, Cape Colony
- Died: 18 November 1954 (aged 62); Paris, France
- Batting: Right-handed
- Relatives: Reginald Hands (brother); Philip Hands (brother)

Domestic team information
- Years: Team
- 1912: Oxford University
- 1921/22–1930/31: Western Province

Career statistics
Competition	First-class
Matches	31
Runs scored	1,543
Batting average	29.11
100s/50s	3/4
Top score	171 not out
Balls bowled	891
Wickets	17
Bowling average	33.41
5 wickets in innings	0
10 wickets in match	0
Best bowling	4/25
Catches/stumpings	12/–
- Source: Cricinfo, 29 October 2017

Kenneth Charles Myburgh Hands (22 March 1892 – 18 November 1954) was a South African cricketer who played first-class cricket from 1912 to 1931.

Kenneth Hands was born in Stellenbosch, Cape Colony in 1892, son of Sir Harry Hands KBE and Lady Aletta Hands (née Myburgh) OBE. He was educated at Diocesan College before becoming a Rhodes Scholar, like his elder brothers Reginald and Philip. Also like his brothers he gained a rugby blue. He became a Rhodes Scholar in 1910 and went up to Oxford. He studied engineering and practised as a civil engineer before switching to accounting and joining his father's firm of accountants, Hands & Shore, in Cape Town.

In the First World War he served with distinction as a lieutenant with the Royal Engineers and was mentioned in dispatches.

Hands played regularly for Western Province from 1921 to 1931. His highest score was 171 not out, out of a team total of 319 for 8 declared in the second innings against Natal in 1925–26, when he also top-scored in Western Province's first innings with 42. He also followed his brothers into the national team, but unlike them he did not play Test cricket. His one match for South Africa was against S. B. Joel's English team in 1924–25, when in the third match of the series he failed with the bat, although his 17 in the first innings was the second-highest score.

He died on 18 November 1954, in Paris.
