= Harry Hands =

British colonial politician (1860–1948)

Sir Harry Hands KBE

Mayor of Cape Town
- In office 1912–1913
- Preceded by: Sir Frank Smith
- Succeeded by: John Parker
- In office 1915–1918
- Preceded by: John Parker
- Succeeded by: William J. Thorne

Personal details
- Born: Harry Hands; 18 September 1860 Kings Norton, Worcestershire
- Died: 17 March 1948 (aged 87) Claremont, Cape Town
- Spouse: Aletta Catharina Myburgh
- Education: King Edward's School, Birmingham

Sir Harry Hands KBE (18 September 1860 – 17 March 1948) was a British colonial politician, who served from 1915 to 1918 as mayor of Cape Town, South Africa. He is credited with instituting the first practice in the world of an official two-minute silence to honour loss of life in conflict, following the death of his eldest son Reginald Hands in World War I, at the suggestion of councillor Robert Rutherford Brydone.

== Biography ==
The eldest son of Josiah and Selina Hands of Kings Norton, Worcestershire, Harry Hands was educated at King Edward's School, Birmingham. He married Aletta Catharina Myburgh (later OBE) in Worcestershire on 6 October 1886. Aletta was the daughter of Philip Albert Myburgh, a member of the Cape Legislative Assembly and a prominent member of society.

Hands himself was a member of the Legislative Assembly of the Cape Colony from 1912 to 1913 and in 1915–18 he served as mayor of Cape Town. During his term as mayor, he was also an incorporated accountant of the firm Hands and Shore in Cape Town.

Following the "Conference of War Recruiting Committees of the Union of South Africa" in February 1918, a special recruiting drive was begun, inaugurated by church services throughout the city and suburbs in April. Twelve days later, on 20 April 1918, Hands received a telegram informing him and Aletta that their eldest son, Captain Reginald Harry Myburgh Hands, had died of wounds received fighting on the Western Front in World War I. Pondering this devastating news, Mayor Hands and his friend and fellow councillor Robert Brydone came up with the idea of the two-minute silence. The practice impressed Sir Percy FitzPatrick, who wrote to Lord Milner about it and the idea was taken up after Armistice Day in London in 1918.

Hands was appointed a Knight Commander of the Order of the British Empire in the 1919 Birthday Honours for his sterling service to recruiting in South Africa and, as noted in the South African Lady’s Pictorial (July 1919, p. 5), "for his services as chairman of the Recruiting Committee, he did splendid work and it is due to him that the impressive Mid-day Pause was introduced."

His three sons, Reginald, Philip and Kenneth, were all Rhodes Scholars who excelled at cricket and rugby. Reginald and Philip played Test cricket for South Africa. Philip and Kenneth also fought in World War I, but returned home safely, married and had children. Harry's daughter, Doris, married Dr Errington Atkinson of Leeds.

Sir Harry Hands died on 17 March 1948 in Cape Town and is buried in Maitland Cemetery, along with his wife.
