= Arsen Cebrzyński =

Polish officer (1912–1940)

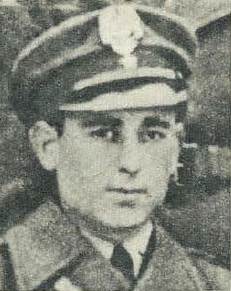
- Cebrzyński in 1940.
- Born: 8 March 1912; Batumi, Caucasus Viceroyalty, Russian Empire (now part of Georgia)
- Died: 11 September 1940 (aged 28); Pembury, England
- Burial place: Northwood Cemetery, Greater London, England
- Education: Polish Air Force University
- Military career
- Allegiance: Poland (1934–1939); Polish government-in-exile (1939–1940); France (1939–1940); United Kingdom (1940)
- Branch: Polish Air Force (1934–1939); Polish Air Force in-exile (1939–1940); French Air Force (1939–1940); Royal Air Force (1940)
- Service years: 1934–1940
- Rank: Second lieutenant (1934–1938); Lieutenant (1938–1940); Flying officer (1940; Royal Air Force)
- Units: 1st Aviation Regiment (1934–1936); 111th Fighter Escadrille (1936–1939); Frontal Group Ce (1940); No. 303 Squadron (1940)
- Commands: Frontal Group Ce (1940)
- Conflicts: Second World War: Invasion of Poland; Battle of France; Battle of Britain †

Arsen Cebrzyński (Polish: [arˈsɛn t͡sɛbˈʐɘ̟ɲ.ski]; 8 March 1912 – 11 September 1940) was a Polish military officer and aircraft pilot. He served in the Polish Air Force, with the rank of a lieutenant, during the Invasion of Poland in the Second World War in 1939. Afterwards he served in the French Air Force during the Battle of France, and in the Royal Air Force during the Battle of Britain in 1940, being killed in action in the latter.

== History ==
Arsen Cebrzyński was born on 8 March 1912 in Batumi, then part of the Caucasus Viceroyalty in the Russian Empire, now being located in Georgia. In 1918, his family moved with him to Warsaw Poland. In 1932, he joined the Polish Air Force University in Dęblin. On 4 August 1934, the president of Poland, Ignacy Mościcki, granted him the rank of a second lieutenant, with the officer seniority from 15 August 1934, placing him at the 17th position in the aeronautics officer corps. The minister of military affairs, Józef Piłsudski, placed him in the 1st Aviation Regiment of the Polish Air Force. In 1936, Cebrzyński graduated from the Pilot Academy in Grudziądz, following which, he was assigned to the 111th Fighter Escadrille. On 19 March 1938, Cebrzyński was promoted to a lieutenant, with the officer seniority placing him at the 46th place in the lineal group of the aviation officer corps. During the German invasion on Poland in September 1939, he was one of the first pilots on the Polish side to destroy an enemy plane. On 3 September, Cebrzyński destroyed a Messerschmitt Bf 109 fighter aircraft, and together with Zdzisław Krasnodębski and Mirosław Ferić, they shot down a Messerschmitt Bf 110 fighter-bomber. On 5 September, together with other officers, Cebrzyński destroyed a Junkers Ju 87.

The grave of Arsen Cebrzyński at the Northwood Cemetery in London, England.

Following the capitulation of Poland, Cebrzyński traveled via Romania to France, where he served the Polish Air Force of the government-in-exile. He became the leader of the Frontal Group Ce, a unit formed predominantly of Polish officers, subsiding to the 2/6 Fighter Squadron of the French Air Force. It was equipped with the Bloch MB.150 fighter aircraft. It participated in the Battle of France, during which, Cebrzyński shot down 1 plane and was credited with 5/6 of a destruction of another one. On 5 June 1940, he shot down a Heinkel He 111 medium bomber, and shared half of the credit for the destruction another airplane of the same model with Zdzisław Henneberg. On 15 June, together with two other pilots, he shot down a Henschel Hs 126 reconnaissance aircraft.

Shortly before the capitulation France, the unit, including Cebrzyński, was evacuated to the United Kingdom via Oran in French Algeria, arriving in England on 7 July 1940. He was assigned to the No. 303 Squadron of the Royal Air Force, with the rank of a flying officer, arriving in Northolt on 21 August 1940. Cebrzyński took part in his first aerial battle in the United Kingdom on 11 September 1940, during which, he piloted a Hawker Hurricane fighter aircraft. The squadron took off from the airbase around 15:30 to intercept the enemy formations over the Horsham area. During the fight, he probably destroyed a Dornier Do 17 light bomber. Cebrzyński died during the air battle, with his aircraft being shot down, and him suffering severe wounds. He was 28 years old. Around 16:15, his plane crashed at the Hitchens Farm in the village of Pembury, England. His body was found lying near the aircraft, probably falling out prior to the collision with the ground. He was buried at the Northwood Cemetery in the town of Northwood, which is now part of Greater London, within the borough of Hillingdon.

== Awards and decorations ==
- Aviation Medal
- Cross of Valour (double)
- Pilot Field Badge
