= Philip Hands =

South African cricketer (1890–1951)

Personal information
- Full name: Philip Albert Myburgh Hands
- Born: 18 March 1890; Claremont, Cape Town, Cape Colony
- Died: 27 April 1951 (aged 61); Parys, Orange Free State, South Africa
- Batting: Right-handed
- Bowling: Right-arm
- Relatives: Reginald Hands (brother); Kenneth Hands (brother)

International information
- National side: South Africa
- Test debut: 13 December 1913 v England
- Last Test: 26 July 1924 v England

Career statistics
Competition	Test	First-class
Matches	7	52
Runs scored	300	2,034
Batting average	25.00	25.11
100s/50s	0/2	3/10
Top score	83	119
Balls bowled	37	138
Wickets	0	5
Bowling average	–	16.80
5 wickets in innings	–	0
10 wickets in match	–	0
Best bowling	–	3/9
Catches/stumpings	3/–	20/–
- Source: CricketArchive, 13 November 2022

Philip Albert Myburgh Hands (14 April 1890 – 27 April 1951), was a South African cricketer who played in seven Tests from 1913 to 1924. His elder brother Reginald also played Test cricket for South Africa, whilst his younger brother Kenneth was also a cricketer, although he didn't play Test cricket.

Hands was born in Claremont, Cape Town, son of Sir Harry Hands KBE and Lady Aletta Hands (née Myburgh) OBE. He died in Parys, Orange Free State, in 1951.

Like his brothers, he was educated at Diocesan College, Rondebosch and up to Oxford as a Rhodes Scholar in 1908. Initially starting a law degree, he switched to accounting.

Serving in the Royal Garrison Artillery, he was awarded the DSO and the MC in the First World War and reached the rank of major.

He was a hard-hitting batsman whose highest Test score was 83 against England in 1913–14, scored out of 98 in 105 minutes. He toured England in 1924, but was not successful.
