= Northwood Cemetery, London =

Cemetery in Hillington, London

Coordinates: 51.6006°N 0.4175°W

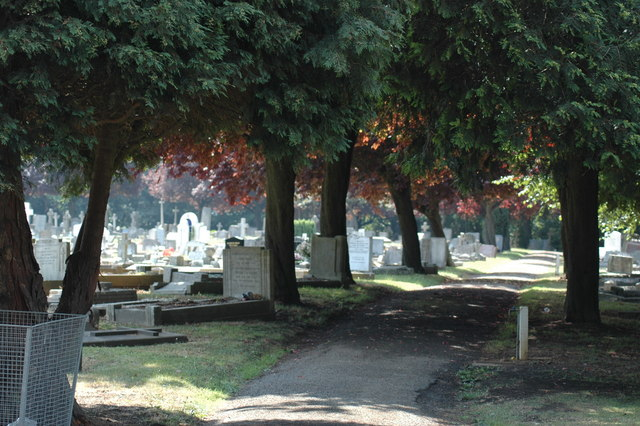
Northwood Cemetery

Northwood Cemetery was opened in 1915 as a consequence of population growth in the Northwood area. It is now in the London Borough of Hillingdon. The land was once part of Ruislip Common, and covers over 15 acres of land. Access is from Chestnut Avenue.

The cemetery contains 121 Commonwealth war graves, 5 from World War I and the remainder from World War II who are mostly buried in a war graves plot in Section H. Many airmen stationed at RAF Northolt, among them 63 Polish Air Force personnel, are buried here.

== Notable interments ==
- Marian Belc, Polish World War II flying ace
- Arsen Cebrzyński, Polish World War II fighter aircraft pilot
- Miroslaw Feric, Polish World War II flying ace
- Edward George Honey, Australian journalist
- Ludwik Witold Paszkiewicz, Polish World War II flying ace
- Dinah Sheridan, English actress
- Frank Oliver Evans, crewmember and survivor of RMS Titanic
