= National Service of Remembrance =

UK annual event, second Sunday in November

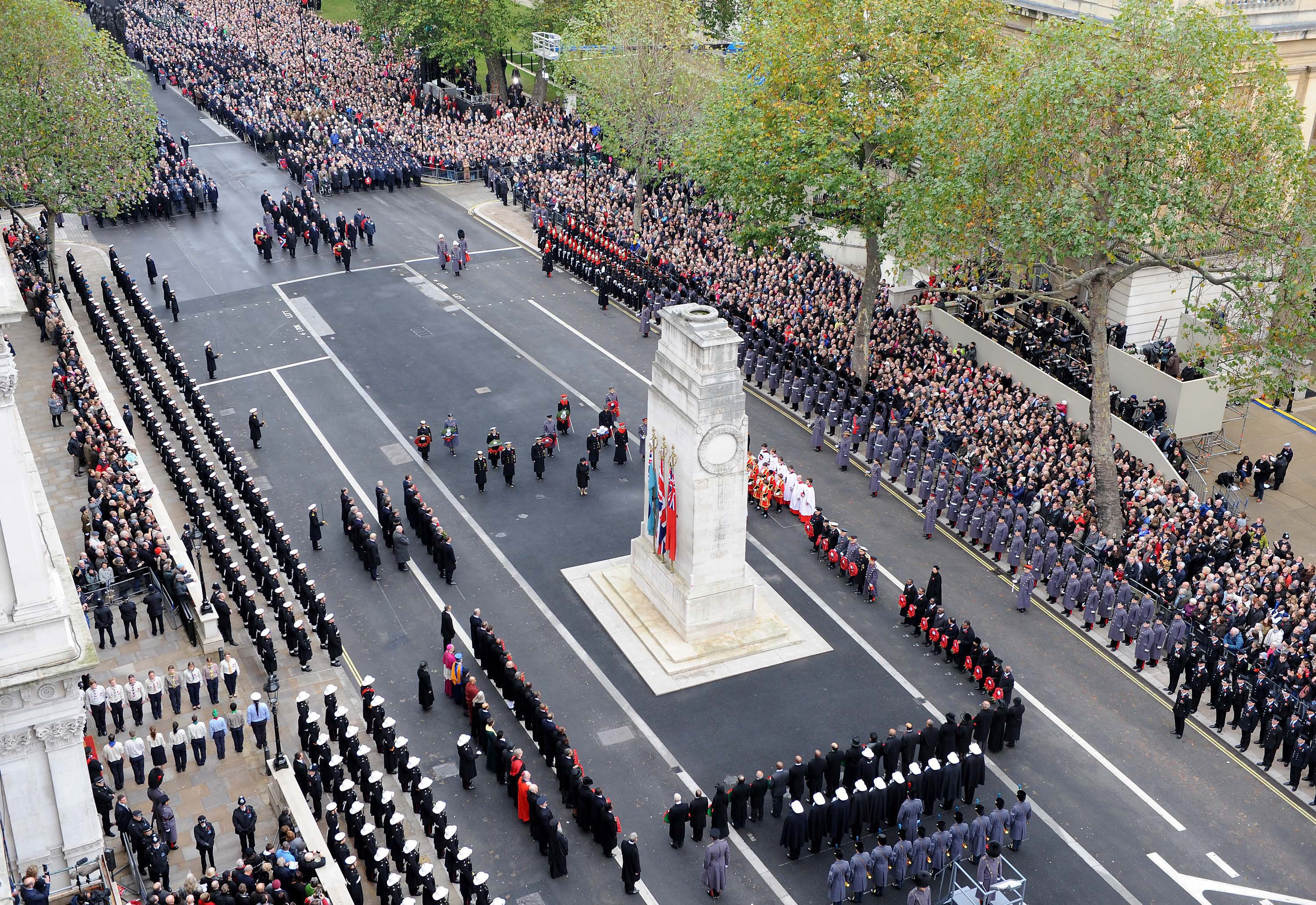
The ceremony at the Cenotaph in November 2010

The National Service of Remembrance is held every year on Remembrance Sunday at the Cenotaph on Whitehall, London. It commemorates "the contribution of British and Commonwealth military and civilian servicemen and women in the two World Wars and later conflicts". It takes place on the second Sunday in November, the Sunday nearest to 11 November, Armistice Day, (Note: These two statements are in effect the same: the second Sunday is always between 8 and 14 November inclusive, so the second Sunday is no more than three days away from 11 November, and therefore always the Sunday nearest to 11 November.) the anniversary of the end of hostilities in the First World War at 11 a.m. in 1918.

The service has its origins in the 1920s and has changed little in format since. To open the ceremony, a selection of national airs and solemn music representing each of the nations of the United Kingdom are played by massed bands and pipes. A short religious service is held with a two-minute silence commencing when Big Ben chimes at 11 am. Following this, wreaths are laid by the King and members of the royal family, senior politicians representing their respective political parties, and High commissioners from the Commonwealth of Nations. After the wreath-laying ceremony, a march-past of hundreds of veterans processes past the Cenotaph. The ceremony has been broadcast nationally by the BBC on radio since 1928 and was first broadcast by the BBC Television Service in 1937.

== Origins ==
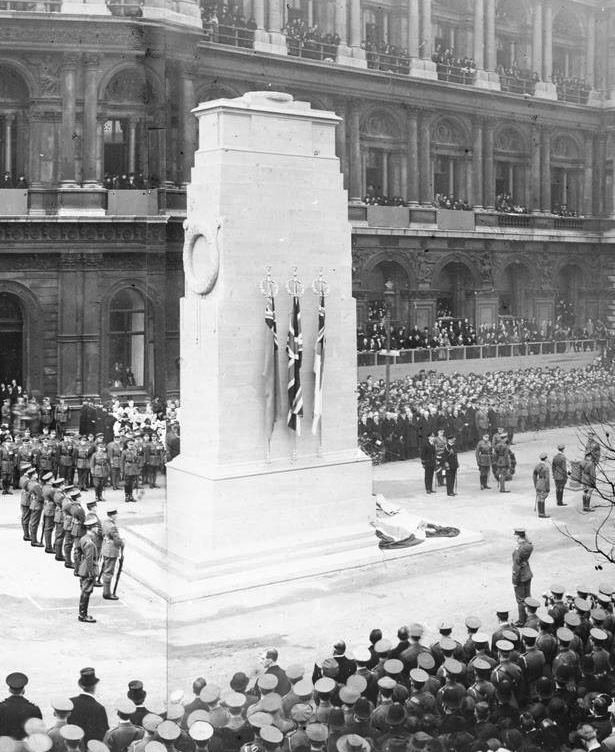
The unveiling ceremony on 11 November 1920

The Cenotaph has its origin in a temporary wood-and-plaster structure designed by Edwin Lutyens for a peace parade following the end of the First World War. Lutyens was inspired by the Greek idea of a cenotaph Greek: κενοτάφιον kenotaphion (κενός kenos, meaning "empty", and τάφος taphos, "tomb"), as representative for a tomb elsewhere or in a place unknown. For some time after the parade, the base of the memorial was covered with flowers and wreaths by members of the public. Pressure mounted to retain it, and the British War Cabinet decided on 30 July 1919 that a permanent memorial should replace the wooden version and be designated Britain's official national war memorial.

Lutyens's permanent structure was built from Portland stone between 1919 and 1920 by Holland, Hannen & Cubitts as a "replica exact in every detail in permanent material of present temporary structure".

The memorial was unveiled by King George V on 11 November 1920, the second anniversary of the Armistice with Germany that ended the First World War. The unveiling ceremony was part of a larger procession bringing the Unknown Warrior to be laid to rest in his tomb nearby in Westminster Abbey. The funeral procession route passed the Cenotaph, where the waiting King laid a wreath on the Unknown Warrior's gun-carriage before proceeding to unveil the memorial which was draped in large Union Flags.

During the Second World War, the National Service and other commemorations were moved from Armistice Day itself to the preceding Sunday as an emergency measure, to minimise any loss of wartime production. In 1945, 11 November fell on a Sunday but in 1946, following a national debate, the government announced that the Cenotaph ceremony would henceforward on take place on Remembrance Sunday.

== Protests and incidents ==
Several protests have occurred at the annual service. In November 1937 during the two-minute silence, a "thick-set, fair-haired man" rushed from the crowd and came close to King George VI, Prime Minister Neville Chamberlain and members of his cabinet. He shouted "All this hypocrisy" and a statement which ended with "...preparing for war". He was tackled by six police officers and carried away. Again, at the 1939 event, a woman cried out "Hypocrites". In November 1969 during the Nigerian Civil War eight young people "struggling and weeping" shouted "Remember Biafra" and were silenced by police who put their hands over the protestors mouths. In 1973 two women who had been widowed by war shouted "What about the war widows?" during the two minute silence. Police put their hands over their mouths and took them away. Their protest was condemmed by the Royal British Legion. The chair of the War Widows Association of Great Britain, Jill Gee condemmed the protest "because a number of influential people were offended...however well intended, it is necessary to choose our plans of campaign with care". In November 1990 a man set himself on fire with a cigarette lighter after dousing himself with liquid and shouted "What about people now". The political intent of his protest was unknown, but it occurred following the deployment of British forces during the Gulf War. The man was subsequently in a stable condition at St Thomas' Hospital. Five police officers were treated for minor burns and some onlookers were treated for shock.

== Order of service ==
=== Preparation ===
Military detachments form up on Whitehall from 10.30 am. From precisely 10:36 a.m., a programme of music is played: known as "the Traditional Music", it has remained largely unchanged since 1930. Beginning with "Rule Britannia!", the sequence consists of a selection of National Airs and solemn music representing the four nations of the United Kingdom performed by the massed bands of the Household Division interposed Pipes and Drums from the Highlanders 4th Battalion The Royal Regiment of Scotland. The massed band represents the four nations; the Band of the Grenadier Guards, Band of the Coldstream Guards, Band of the Scots Guards and the Band of the Irish Guards.

=== Processions ===
At 10.50 a.m., as the band plays "Dido's Lament" by Henry Purcell, the clergy and choir of the Chapel Royal proceed to their places, led by a cross-bearer. The service is led by the Dean of the Chapels Royal (usually the Bishop of London). During Solemn Melody by Henry Walford Davies, senior politicians, High Commissioners of Commonwealth countries and religious leaders from many faiths assemble, joined (since 2018) by humanists representing the non-religious. Former prime ministers are usually in attendance; in 2026 nine were present (John Major, Tony Blair, Gordon Brown, David Cameron, Theresa May, Boris Johnson, Liz Truss, Rishi Sunak and Keir Starmer). The parade stands to attention in silence as the King and senior members of the Royal Family emerge, shortly before 11 o'clock.

=== Two-minute silence ===
As Big Ben strikes 11 a.m., the King's Troop Royal Horse Artillery fire a single shot salute from First World War-era guns on Horse Guards Parade. Two minutes' silence is then observed. The silence represents the eleventh hour of the eleventh day of the eleventh month in 1918, when the guns of Europe fell silent. This silence is ended by Gunners of the Royal Horse Artillery firing a gun salute, then Royal Marines buglers sound the Last Post.

=== Wreath laying ===
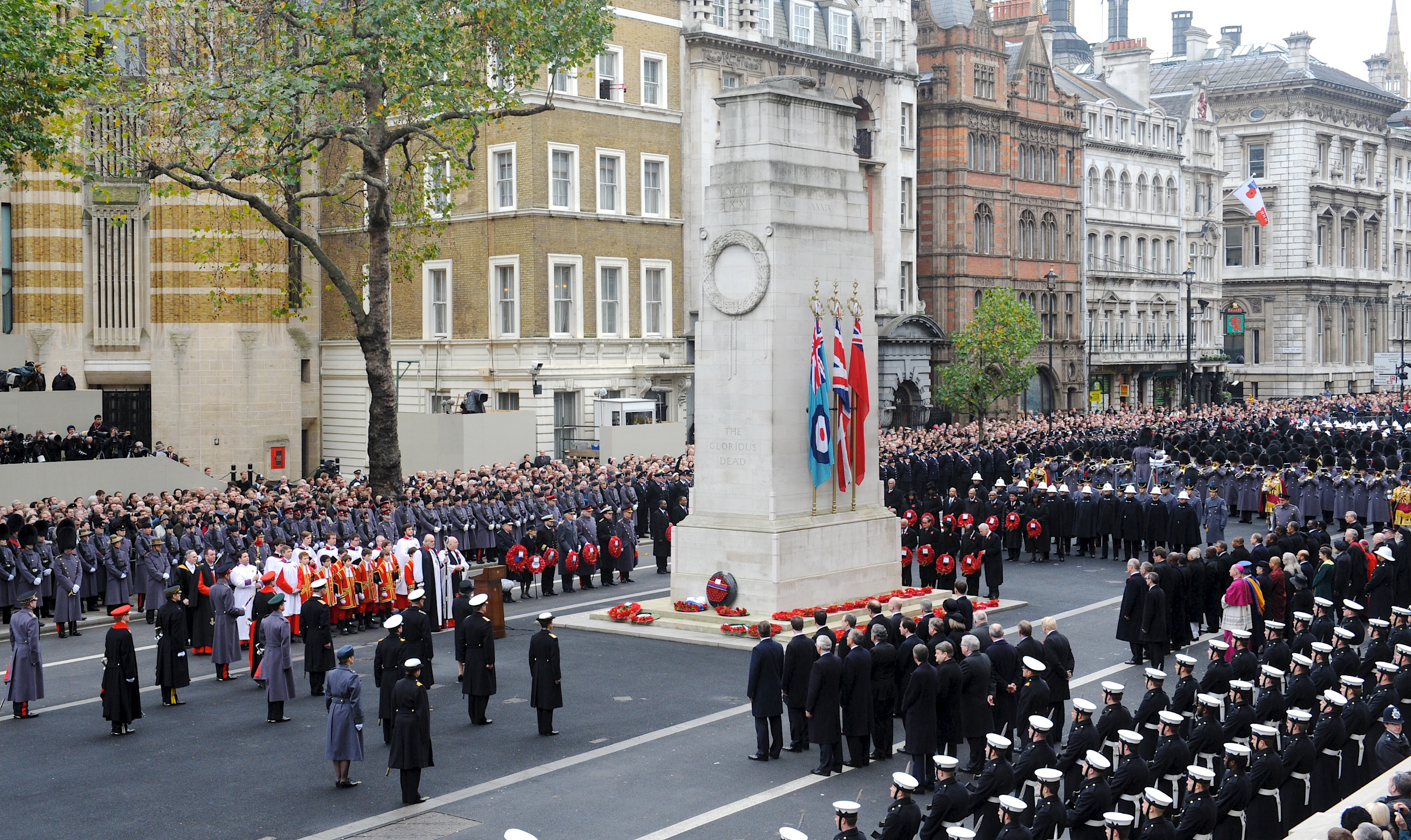
The wreath-laying ceremony on 14 November 2010

The first wreath is traditionally laid on behalf of the nation by His Majesty The King. The Queen's wreath is then laid by an equerry, and wreaths are laid by the Prince of Wales and other senior members of the Royal Family (in 2026 the Duke of Edinburgh and the Princess Royal laid wreaths, and a wreath was laid on behalf of the Duke of Kent). Members of the Royal Family who are laying wreaths stand with the king, while others watch the ceremony from the Foreign Office balcony.

On two occasions foreign heads of state have laid wreaths on behalf of their people. In 2015, Willem-Alexander, King of the Netherlands, placed a wreath in commemoration of the 70th anniversary of the British liberation of the Netherlands in World War II. At the 2018 service, Frank-Walter Steinmeier, President of Germany, at the invitation of Queen Elizabeth II on the advice of her government, next laid a wreath on behalf of the German people, marking the first time a representative of that country has done so.

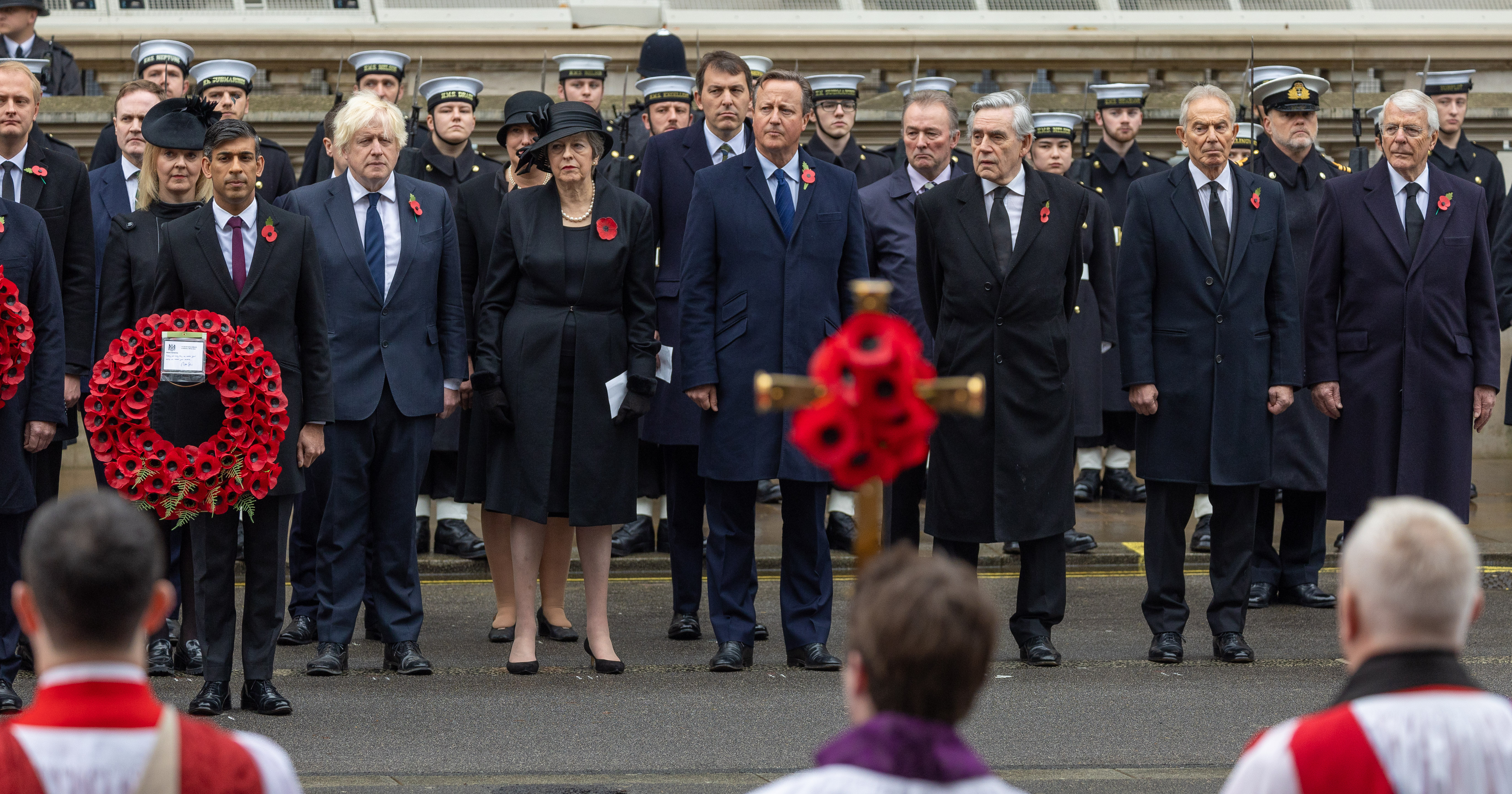
All the living prime ministers, at the 2023 Service of Remembrance (left to right: Truss, Sunak, Johnson, May, Cameron, Brown, Blair, Major)

The Massed Band plays "Beethoven Funeral March No.1" by Johann Heinrich Walch as wreaths are laid by the Prime Minister on behalf of His Majesty's Government, by the Leader of the Opposition and by leaders of other opposition parties (namely those with 6 or more MPs). (Occasionally another Commonwealth head of government has been present and has laid a wreath along with the UK Prime Minister.) Since 2017 the Speaker of the House of Commons and the Lord Speaker of the House of Lords have each then laid a wreath. Wreaths are then laid by the Foreign Secretary and (since 2019) the Home Secretary. (Prior to 2019 the Foreign Secretary laid a special wreath on behalf of the British Overseas Territories: it was of a unique design, being made up of stems and flowers from each territory; since then, individual wreaths have been laid by representatives of each overseas territory, while the Foreign Secretary has used a regular poppy wreath.)

The Commonwealth high commissioners then lay their wreaths, followed by the ambassadors of Ireland (since 2014) and Nepal (since 2019). Wreaths are then laid by the Chief of the Defence Staff, the Chief of the Naval Staff, the Chief of the General Staff and the Chief of the Air Staff, followed by representatives of the Merchant Navy and fishing fleets, and the civilian emergency services.

=== Conclusion ===
A short religious service of remembrance is then conducted by the Dean of the Chapels Royal. The hymn O God Our Help In Ages Past is sung, led by the massed bands and the Choir of the Chapel Royal. The whole assembly recites Lord's Prayer and the service concludes with a blessing. The Rouse is then played by the buglers, followed by the national anthem being sung by all. The King and the other members of the Royal Family salute the Cenotaph and the royal party then departs.

== The March Past ==
After the ceremony, as the bands play a selection of marches and arrangements of WWI and WWII-era popular songs, a parade of 10,000 veterans, organised by the Royal British Legion, marches past the Cenotaph. Most participants march as part of a veterans organisation or other recognised group or association; but individuals may also apply to attend. Each contingent salutes the Cenotaph as they pass and many wreaths are handed over to be laid at its base; they salute the Cenotaph (meaning "empty tomb" in Greek) as they are paying tribute to all those it represents, to all those who died and who lie buried elsewhere. As the veterans march back to Horse Guards Parade a member of the Royal Family takes their salute in front of the Guards Memorial.

Those entitled to take part in the parade are:

- Ex-service personnel from the UK and the Commonwealth who have served the Crown.
- Retired emergency services personnel from the UK and Commonwealth who have served the Crown.
- Partners or first-generation family members of those who served in His Majesty's Armed Forces and have died.
- Those marching on behalf of organisations that have historically played a significant role in times of conflict, organisations supporting the Armed Forces community or key organisations in Remembrance.

The carer of a veteran requiring assistance is also entitled to attend.

Conflict veterans from World War II, Korea, the Falklands, the Persian Gulf, Kosovo, Bosnia, Northern Ireland, Iraq, Afghanistan and other past conflicts have taken part in the parade in recent years; around a dozen surviving Second World War veterans took part in 2026. In 2008, on the 90th anniversary of the end of the First World War, three veterans of that conflict attended the ceremony: Henry Allingham, Harry Patch and Bill Stone; all three died the following year.

Professor Jeffrey Richards notes that the format of the ceremony was "more or less finalized by 1921" although before the Second World War, the wreath-laying by the monarch and dignitaries took place before 11 am.

== Traditional music ==
Each year, the programme of music at the National Ceremony remains the same, following a programme finalised in 1930, and is known as "the Traditional Music":

Name	Composer	Date	Notes	Sample text
"Rule, Britannia!"	Thomas Arne	1740	Patriotic song, originating from the poem "Rule, Britannia" by James Thomson. Originally included in Alfred, a masque about Alfred the Great co-written by Thomson and David Mallet and first performed on 1 August 1740. It is strongly associated with the Royal Navy, but also used by the British Army.	Rule, Britannia! Britannia, rule the waves; / Britons never never never will be slaves.
"Heart of Oak"	William Boyce	1760	Words were written by the 18th-century English actor David Garrick and first performed as part of Garrick's pantomime Harlequin's Invasion, at the Theatre Royal, Drury Lane in 1760. The official march of the Royal Navy of the United Kingdom, Royal Canadian Navy, Royal New Zealand Navy and formerly of the Royal Australian Navy.	Heart of Oak are our ships / Jolly Tars are our men / We always are ready: Steady, boys, Steady! / We'll fight and we'll conquer again and again.
"The Minstrel Boy"	Traditional Irish air	19th century	An Irish patriotic song written by Thomas Moore (1779–1852) who set it to the melody of The Moreen, an old Irish air. It is widely believed that Moore composed the song in remembrance of a number of his friends from Trinity College, Dublin who had participated in (and were killed during) the Irish Rebellion of 1798. Associated with the Irish Army and with traditionally Irish regiments in the armies of the United Kingdom.	The minstrel boy to the war is gone, / In the ranks of death you'll find him; / His father's sword he has girded on, / And his wild harp slung behind him;
"Men of Harlech" (Rhyfelgyrch Gwŷr Harlech)	Traditional Welsh air	1794, possible earlier origin	Welsh song and march which is traditionally said to describe events during the seven-year siege of Harlech Castle between 1461 and 1468. The music was first published without words during 1794 but it is said to be a much earlier folk song. The earliest version of the tune to appear with lyrics comes from a broadside printed c. 1830.	Men of Harlech, march to glory, / Victory is hov'ring o'er ye, / Bright-eyed freedom stands before ye, / Hear ye not her call?
"The Skye Boat Song"	Traditional Scottish air	1884, earlier origins	The song tells how Bonnie Prince Charlie, disguised as a serving maid, escaped in a small boat after the defeat of his Jacobite rising of 1745, with the aid of Flora MacDonald. The song is a traditional expression of Jacobitism. The lyrics were written by Sir Harold Boulton, 2nd Baronet, to an air collected in the 1870s by Anne Campbelle MacLeod (1855–1921) and first published in 1884.	Speed, bonnie boat, like a bird on the wing, / Onward! the sailors cry; / Carry the lad that's born to be King / Over the sea to Skye.
"Isle of Beauty"	T.A. Rawlings	1884	A setting of a poem by Thomas Haynes Bayly, the originator of the phrase "Absence makes the heart grow fonder".	What would I not give to wander, / Where my old companions dwell... / Absence makes the heart grow fonder; / Isle of Beauty, "Fare-thee-well!"
"David of the White Rock" (Dafydd y Garreg Wen)	David Owen (attrib.)	18th century	Welsh national air. The tune is traditionally said to have been composed by David Owen (1712–1741), a harpist who lived at a farm known as "The White Rock" near Porthmadog in Caernarfonshire. He is said to have composed the air as he lay on his death bed.	'Bring me my harp', was David's sad sigh, / 'I would play one more tune before I die. / Help me, dear wife, put the hands to the strings, / I wish my loved ones the blessing God brings.'
"Oft in the Stilly Night"	John Andrew Stevenson	1818 arrangement of older tune	Scottish air arranged by Stevenson in 1818 to words by Thomas Moore (who also wrote the words to "The Minstrel Boy").	Oft, in the stilly night, / Ere slumber's chain has bound me, / Fond memory brings the light / Of other days around me; / The smiles, the tears, / Of boyhood's years, / The words of love then spoken; / The eyes that shone, / Now dimm’d and gone, / The cheerful hearts now broken!
"Flowers of the Forest"	Scottish folk tune	17th century, possibly older	Commemorates the defeat of the Scottish army of James IV at the Battle of Flodden in September 1513. The melody was recorded c. 1615-25 in the John Skene of Halyards Manuscript as "Flowres of the Forrest", although it may have been composed earlier. Jean Elliot (b. 1727) added the standard text to the tune in 1756.	I've heard the lilting, at the yowe-milking, / Lassies a-lilting before dawn o' day; / But now they are moaning on ilka green loaning; / "The Flowers of the Forest are a' wede away".
"Nimrod" from the Enigma Variations	Edward Elgar	1889	Edward Elgar composed his Variations on an Original Theme, Op. 36 in 1898-9 with each variation giving a musical portrait of a friend. Variation No IX is a portrait of his editor August Jaeger from the London publisher Novello & Co. Jaeger encouraged Elgar as an artist and had stimulated him to continue composing despite setbacks. The name of the variation refers to Nimrod, an Old Testament patriarch described as "a mighty hunter before the Lord" – Jäger being German for hunter.	
"Dido's Lament" from Dido and Aeneas	Henry Purcell	1689	The final scene of the opera Dido and Aeneas by Henry Purcell (libretto by Nahum Tate). Dido, the Queen of Carthage, rejects her lover Aeneas for having thought of leaving her.	When I am laid, am laid in earth, May my wrongs create / No trouble, no trouble in thy breast; / Remember me, remember me, but ah! forget my fate.
"The Supreme Sacrifice" ("O Valiant Hearts")	Charles Harris	c.1919	Words were taken from a poem by Sir John Stanhope Arkwright (1872–1954), published in The Supreme Sacrifice, and other Poems in Time of War (1919). Set to music by the Rev. Dr. Charles Harris, Vicar of Colwall, Herefordshire 1909-1929.	O valiant hearts who to your glory came / Through dust of conflict and through battle flame; / Tranquil you lie, your knightly virtue proved, / Your memory hallowed in the land you loved.
Solemn Melody	Henry Walford Davies	1909	Prelude, Solemn Melody for organ and orchestra (1909)	
"Last Post"			A bugle call used at Commonwealth military funerals and ceremonies commemorating those who have been killed in war. The "Last Post" call originally signaled merely that the final sentry post had been inspected, and the camp was secure for the night.	
Beethoven's Funeral March No 1	Johann Heinrich Walch	Walch lived 1776–1855	Formerly attributed to Ludwig van Beethoven and catalogued as WoO Anhang 13 (supplementary work without opus number), but now known to have been composed by his contemporary Johann Heinrich Walch. Played at the funeral of King Edward VII in 1910.	
"O God, Our Help in Ages Past" ("St Anne")	William Croft	1708	A hymn by Isaac Watts and paraphrases the 90th Psalm of the Book of Psalms. The tune by William Croft was composed whilst he was the organist of the church of St Anne, Soho: hence the name of the tune. It first appeared anonymously in the Supplement to the New Version of the Psalms, 6th edition in 1708.	O God, our help in ages past, / Our hope for years to come, / Our shelter from the stormy blast, / And our eternal home.
"The Rouse"			"The Rouse" is a bugle call most often associated with the military in Commonwealth countries. It is commonly played following "Last Post" at military services, and is often mistakenly referred to as "Reveille".	
"God Save the King"	John Bull (attrib.)	1619, 1744	The national anthem of the United Kingdom of Great Britain and Northern Ireland.	God save our gracious King! / Long live our noble King! / God save the King! / Send him victorious, / Happy and glorious, / Long to reign over us: / God save the King!

Other pieces of music are then played during the unofficial wreath laying and the march past of the veterans, starting with "Trumpet Voluntary" and followed by "It's a Long Way to Tipperary", the marching song of the Connaught Rangers, a famous British Army Irish Regiment of long ago and by the Royal British Legion March, the official march of the official organiser of the ceremony, the Royal British Legion, which is a medley of marches of the First and Second World Wars.

== Television and radio coverage ==
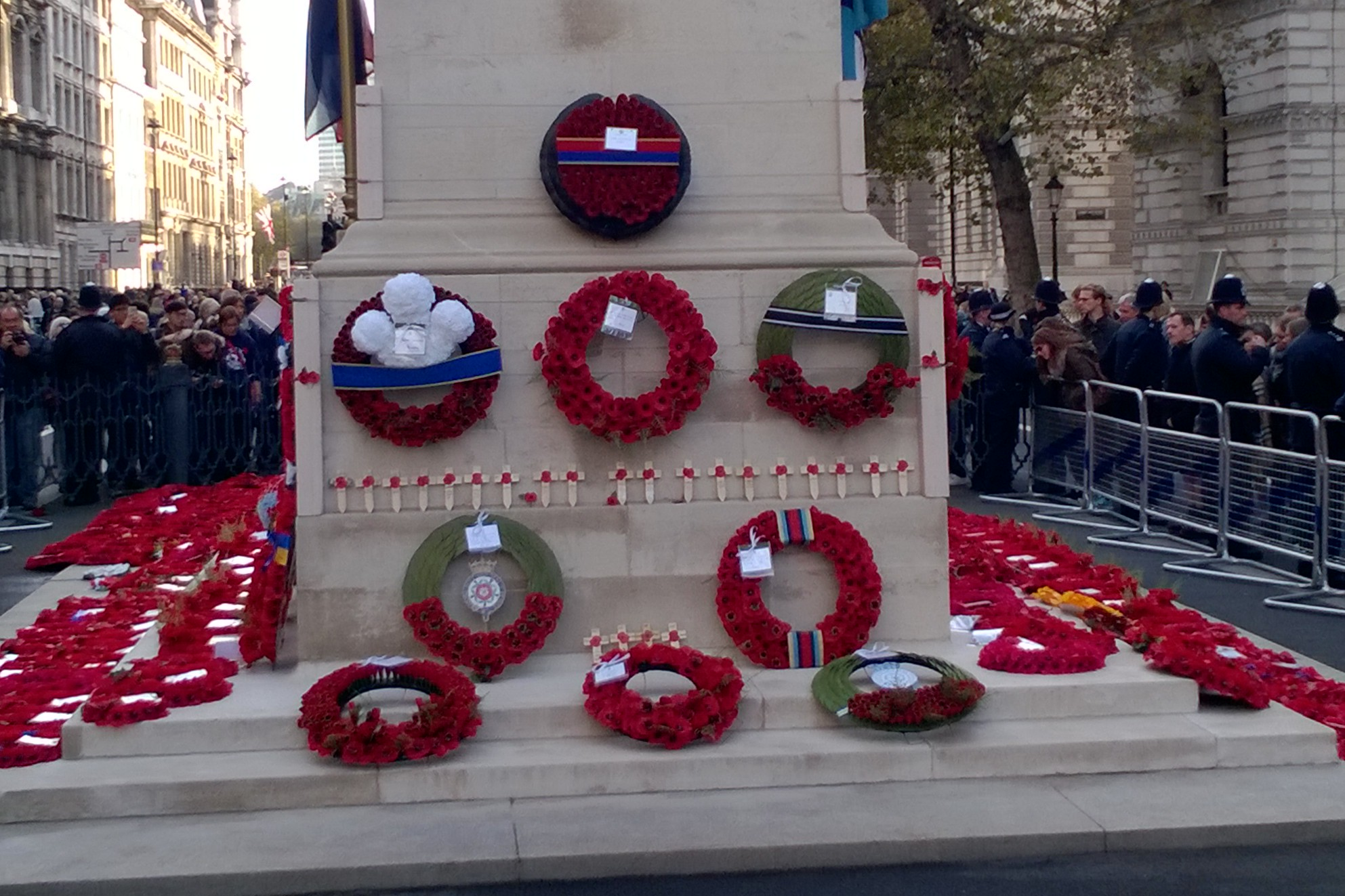
Group of wreaths laid during the Remembrance Sunday ceremony in London

BBC Radio has broadcast the service on the BBC National Programme and its successors, the BBC Home Service and BBC Radio 4, every year since November 1928, except during World War II.

John Reith had wished to broadcast the service for many years, and upon the formation of the British Broadcasting Corporation in 1927 was involved with negotiations with the Home Office, but these broke down and it was only permitted the following year in 1928. Adrian Gregory notes that the paradox of broadcasting two minutes' silence was not lost on the BBC's sound engineers, who had to ensure that there was enough ambient sound (the "strange hush") to capture the solemnity of the moment.

The ceremony was first broadcast by BBC Television in 1937 and again in 1938. Three EMI Super-Emitron cameras first used for the earliest outside broadcast of the Coronation Procession of King George VI in May 1937 were used, relayed via the BBC's Mobile Control Room scanner van, which two days earlier had also broadcast the Lord Mayor's Show for the first time.

The BBC Television Service was suspended at the outbreak of World War II and the broadcast resumed in November 1946 when George VI unveiled the addition of the dates of that conflict, MCMXXXIX (1939) to MCMXLV (1945) to the Cenotaph. It has been televised every year since, making the broadcast one of the longest-running live broadcasts in the world.

In the post-war period, Wynford Vaughan-Thomas and latterly Richard Dimbleby were commentators. Tom Fleming commentated annually between 1966 and 1988, and again from 1994 to 1999. David Dimbleby, the eldest son of Richard Dimbleby, first provided the commentary on the event in 1989, and did so every year from 2000 to 2024; Eric Robson commentated in 1991 and 1993. Petroc Trelawny replaced Dimbleby for the 2025 event.

== See also ==
- Remembrance Sunday
- Remembrance Day
- Two-minute silence
