= Frontal Group Ce =

Frontal Group "Ce"
- Active: 1940 – June 1940
- Allegiance: Polish government-in-exile
- Branch: Polish Air Forces in France
- Role: Fighter air defence
- Size: 3 people
- Nickname(s): Ce
- Engagements: World War 2: Battle of France

Commanders
- Notable commanders: Arsen Cebrzyński

Frontal Group "Ce" (Note: Polish: Klucz Frontowy „Ce”) was a fighter group of the Polish Air Forces in France, formed in 1940, as part of Groupe de Chasse II/6. The group had 3 pilots, and its leader was lieutenant Arsen Cebrzyński. It was disestablished after the Fall of France in 1940. The group was equipped with Bloch MB.150 fighter aircraft.

== Members ==
- lieutenant Arsen Cebrzyński (leader)
- corporal Eugeniusz Szaposznikow
- corporal Michał Brzezowski

== Citations ==
=== Bibliography ===
- W. Król, Walczyłem pod niebem Francji, Warsaw, 1984.
- Pilot Wojenny. 4(7)/2000, 07.2000. Warsaw, ECHO.
