= Frank Oliver Evans =

British sailor and survivor of the Titanic disaster

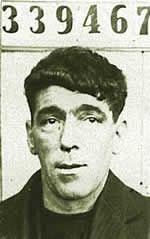
- Born: 15 May 1884; Naphill, Buckinghamshire, England
- Died: 19 May 1952 (aged 68); Uxbridge, Middlesex, England
- Burial place: Northwood Cemetery, London, England
- Occupation: Merchant sailor
- Known for: Surviving crewmember of RMS Titanic

Frank Oliver Evans was a British merchant sailor who was an Able Seaman of the RMS Titanic during its ill-fated maiden voyage. He was known for being a survivor of the ship as well as being one of 18 crew members of the lifeboat drill, and later volunteered to return to the site of the wreck with Fifth Officer Harold Lowe in Lifeboat No. 14.

== Military career ==
Evans was born on 15 May 1884 at Naphill, Buckinghamshire as one of twelve children of Joseph Evans and Mary Elliot. Evans enlisted in the Royal Navy on 17 July 1899 and was initially stationed on HMS Impregnable but later transferred to HMS Lion, HMS Victory, and HMS Mars. On 1901, Evans was docked at Gibraltar as a signal boy and continued service aboard HMS Fearless, HMS Sirius, HMS St Vincent, HMS Formidable and HMS Diana before being discharged on 4 September 1907. Around this time, Evans was described as while having good characteristics, he often got himself into trouble and was arrested at least three times for several misdemeanours.

== Merchant career and the Titanic ==
Evans remained out of any naval service until 1911 when he decided to join the Merchant Navy and was chosen to work at the Union-Castle Line within HMHS Tintagel Castle and the Ferneo and the Olympic of the White Star Line. Evans then signed up to become a crew member of the RMS Titanic on 6 April 1912 and was listed as being from Southampton. Unlike most crew of the Titanic, Evans had recognized his assigned lifeboat due to taking part in the lifeboat drill training prior to the sinking. Evans was at the Forward Mess Hall on the C Deck when the Sinking of the Titanic had occurred. Evans was ordered to find the Carpenter and sound all the wells forward but after failing to find the Carpenter, he found Boatswain Alfred Nichols and along with other crew members, he helped uncover port side boats and lowering Lifeboat's 1 and 12 before being ordered to board Lifeboat 10 by William McMaster Murdoch, joining with Edward John Buley.

Within the water, Lifeboat 10 pulled 200 yards away from the Titanic and managed to unite with Lifeboats 4, 12, 14 and D. Evans reported seeing the Titanic split into two between the 3rd and 4th funnels. Evans was then ordered by Harold Lowe to transfer to Lifeboat 14 and later returned to the Titanic in an attempt to find any remaining survivors. Evans later testified that he could not bring himself to look over the side at the bodies due to fears of becoming unnerved. The crew of Lifeboat 14 saved four people from the water – one of whom died soon after rescue – and later picked up around a dozen survivors from Collapsible A.

After being rescued by the RMS Carpathia, he traveled to New York City and wrote an inquiry with William Alden Smith, documenting his experiences in the Titanic on 26 April 1912.

== Later years ==
Evans continued to work as a merchant sailor during the 1920s, serving in World War I and in World War II. After being made a quartermaster, he served on the Mississippi, San Jeronimo and the Trinculo. After the inquiry, Evans rarely talked about his involvement in the Titanic as the events had traumatized him. He never married and retired at London and spent his final days at Ruislip, Middlesex. He died at the Hillingdon Hospital, Uxbridge, on 19 May 1952 and was buried at the Northwood Cemetery in an unmarked grave.
