= Two-minute silence =

Event held to remember those who died in conflict

In the United Kingdom and other countries within the Commonwealth, a two-minute silence is observed as part of Remembrance Day to remember those who died in conflict. Held each year at 11:00 am on 11 November, the silence coincides with the time in 1918 at which the First World War came to an end with the cessation of hostilities, and is generally observed at war memorials and in public places throughout the UK and Commonwealth. A two-minute silence is also observed on Remembrance Sunday at 11:00 am.

== Origin ==
=== South Africa ===
The practice of the Remembrance Day silence originates in Cape Town, South Africa, where there was a two-minute silence initiated by the daily firing of the noon day gun on Signal Hill for a full year from 14 May 1918 to 14 May 1919, known as the Two Minute Silent Pause of Remembrance.

This was instituted by the Cape Town Mayor, Sir Harry Hands, at the suggestion of councillor Robert Rutherford Brydone, (Note: Brydone's surname is currently incorrectly spelt in the SA Legion article (and on the plaque and in other articles), and they have incorrectly ascribed the death of a different man (Major Walter Brydon) as his son. Major Brydon led the unit in which Harry Hands' son died, and had died only a few days before.) on 14 May 1918, after receiving the news of the death of his son Reginald Hands by gassing on 20 April, adopting into public observance a gesture that had been practised sporadically in city churches since 1916. The first trial observance endured for three minutes on 13 May, after which the Mayor decided that it was too long, and published a notice in the Cape Argus that it should be altered from three minutes to two.

Signalled by the firing of the Noon Gun on Signal Hill, one minute was a time of thanksgiving for those who had returned alive, the second minute was to remember the fallen. Brydone and Hands organised an area where the traffic would be brought to a standstill and the first silence was observed at Cartwright's Corner in Adderley Street. As the city fell silent, a bugler on the balcony of the Fletcher and Cartwright's Building on the corner of Adderley and Darling Streets sounded the "Last Post", and the "Reveille" was played at the end of the pause. It was repeated daily for a full year. Newspapers described how trams, taxis and private vehicles stopped, pedestrians came to a halt and most men removed their hats. People stopped what they were doing at their places of work and sat or stood silently. This short official ceremony was a world first.

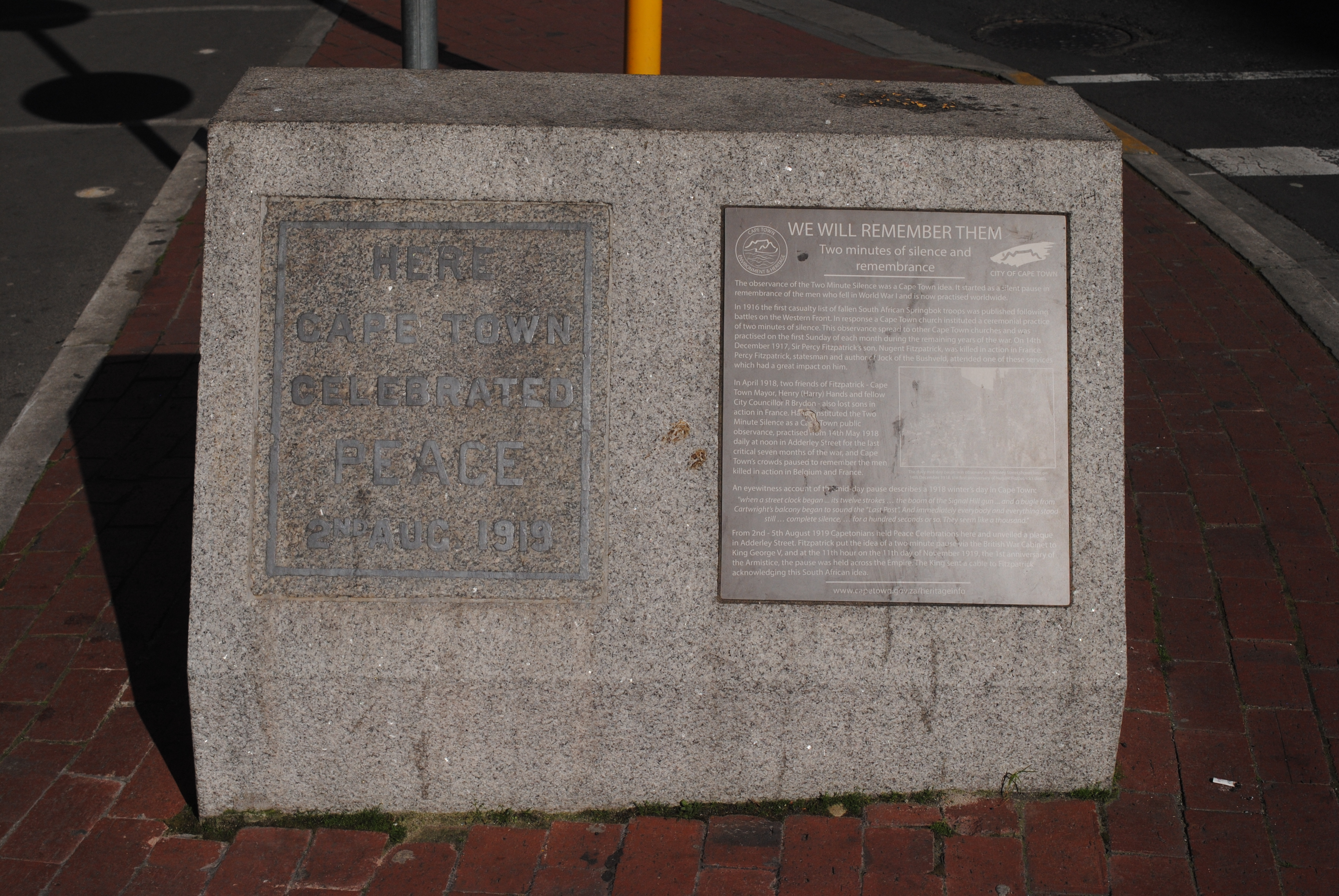
Memorial to the events in Cape Town, located on Adderley Street

A Reuters correspondent in Cape Town cabled a description of the event to London. Within a few weeks Reuters' agency in Cape Town received press cables from London stating that the ceremony had been adopted in two English provincial towns and later by others, including in Canada and Australia.

The midday pause continued daily in Cape Town and was last observed on 17 January 1919, but was revived in Cape Town during the Second World War.

Today, a plaque in front of the Standard Bank building in Adderley Street commemorates the Two Minute Silence. A ceremony commemorating the centenary of the Two Minute Silence was held on Signal Hill on 14 May 2018 at the firing of the Noon Gun.

=== Sir Percy FitzPatrick ===
Sir Percy Fitzpatrick was impressed by and had a personal interest in the daily observance of silence: his own son, Major Percy Nugent George FitzPatrick, had been killed in action in France in December 1917. He had originally been introduced to the idea of a two-minute pause to honour the dead when his local church adopted the idea proposed by a local businessman, J.A. Eagar, when details of losses at the Battle of the Somme first came through to Cape Town in July 1916.

In 1919, he approached Lord Northcliffe (the founder of both the Daily Mirror and the Daily Mail) with the intention of campaigning for it to be observed annually and Empire-wide. His idea was not taken up. Writing to Lord Milner, then Colonial Secretary, he described the silence that fell on the city during this daily ritual, and proposed that this become an official part of the annual service on Armistice Day. He acknowledged that the idea came from Brydone's Cape Town pause, saying that other towns followed its example but "nothing was as dramatic as the Cape Town observation simply because of the midday gun". The meaning behind his proposal was stated to be:

- It is due to the women, who have lost and suffered and borne so much, with whom the thought is ever present.
- It is due to the children that they know to whom they owe their dear fought freedom.
- It is due to the men, and from them, as men.
- But far and away, above all else, it is due to those who gave their all, sought no recompense, and with whom we can never re-pay – our Glorious and Immortal Dead.

=== King George V ===
Milner raised the idea with Lord Stamfordham, the King's Private Secretary, who informed the King, George V, in a note on 27 October 1919:

The enclosed came to me some weeks ago from an old South African friend of mine, Sir Percy Fitzpatrick, who is probably known to you, at any rate by name. I ought to have sent it before. I don't know if such a thing is practicable. But it seems like a fine idea. I think that H.M. would like to see it...

The King was enthusiastic and sought approval from the War Cabinet on 5 November. It was immediately approved, with only Lord Curzon dissenting. A press statement was released from the Palace on 7 November 1919, which was published in The Times:

To all my people,
Tuesday next, 11 November, is the first anniversary of the armistice, which stayed the world-wide carnage of the four preceding years, and marked the victory of right and freedom.
I believe that my people in every part of the Empire fervently wish to perpetuate the memory of that great deliverance and of those who laid down their lives to achieve it.
To afford an opportunity for the universal expression of this feeling it is my desire and hope that at the hour when the Armistice came into force, the 11th hour of the 11th day of the 11th month, there may be for the brief space of two minutes a complete suspension of all our normal activities.
During that time, except in the rare cases where this may be impracticable, all work, all sound, and all locomotion should cease, so that, in perfect stillness, the thoughts of everyone may be concentrated on reverent remembrance of the glorious dead.
No elaborate organisation appears to be necessary.
At a given signal, which could easily be arranged to suit the circumstances of each locality, I believe that we shall all gladly interrupt our business and pleasure, whatever it may be, and unite in this simple service of silence and remembrance.
GEORGE R.I.

=== First two-minute silence on Armistice Day – 11 November 1919 ===
To FitzPatrick's great delight he read:

"The whole World Stands to Attention." "Cables from every part of the world showing how the King's message had been accepted and interpreted, were printed. From the Indian jungles to Alaska, on the trains, on the ships at sea, in every part of the globe where a few British were gathered together, the Two-Minute pause was observed."

In his own words, Sir Percy stated:

I was so stunned by the news that I could not leave the hotel. An hour or two afterwards I received a cable from Lord Long of Wexhall: "Thank you. Walter Long." Only then did I know that my proposal had reached the King and had been accepted and that the Cabinet knew the source.

FitzPatrick was thanked for his contribution by Lord Stamfordham:

Dear Sir Percy,
The King, who learns that you are shortly to leave for South Africa, desires me to assure you that he ever gratefully remembers that the idea of the Two Minute Pause on Armistice Day was due to your initiation, a suggestion readily adopted and carried out with heartfelt sympathy throughout the Empire.

— Signed Stamfordham.

=== Edward George Honey ===
The Australian government recognises Edward George Honey as originator of the idea, but he only aired the suggestion (in a letter to a London newspaper) nearly a year after the custom had been initiated in Cape Town, and no convincing trail of evidence has been shown to suggest that his letter had any impact on either Fitzpatrick's or the King's motivation.

== How to observe the silence ==
The Royal British Legion recommends this order of observance:

1. At 11:00 am, the Last Post is played.
2. The exhortation is then read (see below).
3. The Two Minute Silence then begins.
4. The end of the silence is signalled by playing The Rouse.

The exhortation (excerpt from Ode of Remembrance): "They shall grow not old, as we that are left grow old, Age shall not weary them, nor the years condemn. At the going down of the sun, and in the morning, We will remember them. "Response: "We will remember them."

This order of proceedings is not followed in the UK National Service of Remembrance in London, but is often used in regional ceremonies and in other Commonwealth countries.

== See also ==
- Armistice Day
- Edward George Honey
- Moment of Silence
- Remembrance Day
- Silent Minute
