= Silent Minute =

Historic movement in the United Kingdom

The Silent Minute was an historic movement begun in the United Kingdom by Wellesley Tudor Pole. in 1940. During the Second World War people would unite in meditation, prayer or focus (each according to their own belief) and consciously will for peace to prevail. This dedicated minute received the direct support of King George VI, Winston Churchill and his Parliamentary Cabinet. It was also recognised by U.S. President Franklin D. Roosevelt and observed on land and at sea on the battlefields, in air raid shelters and in hospitals. With Churchill’s support, the BBC, on Sunday, 10 November 1940, began to play the bells of Big Ben on the radio as a signal for the Silent Minute to begin.

== History ==
The idea was developed in Britain in the Second World War, initially from an idea by Major Wellesley Tudor Pole. People were asked to devote one minute of prayer for peace at nine o’clock each evening. He said:

There is no power on earth that can withstand the united cooperation on spiritual levels of men and women of goodwill everywhere. It is for this reason that the continued and widespread observance of the Silent Minute is of such vital importance in the interest of human welfare.

The Silent Minute began in 1940 during The Blitz on the UK when Major Wellesley Tudor-Pole perceived

an inner request from a high spiritual source that there be a Silent Minute of Prayer for Freedom, at 9pm each evening during the striking of Big Ben. If enough people joined in this gesture of dedicated intent, the tide would turn and the invasion of England would be diverted.

Tudor-Pole went to the King and Prime Minister with his request and won both their support.

An anecdote emphasizes the profound power of the group meditation of the Silent Minute. In 1945 a British intelligence officer was interrogating a high Nazi official. He asked him why he thought Germany lost the war. His reply was, “During the war, you had a secret weapon for which we could find no counter measure, which we did not understand, but it was very powerful. It was associated with the striking of the Big Ben each evening. I believe you called it the ‘Silent Minute.’

== See also ==
- Moment of silence
- Two-minute silence
