= Pariser Einzugsmarsch =

German military march

- March by Johann Heinrich Walch
- Catalogue: AM II, 38
- Composed: prior to 1800

The Pariser Einzugsmarsch ("Paris Entry-March") (Armeemarschsammlung AM II, 38) is a well-known German military march composed by Johann Heinrich Walch during the Napoleonic Wars.

== History ==
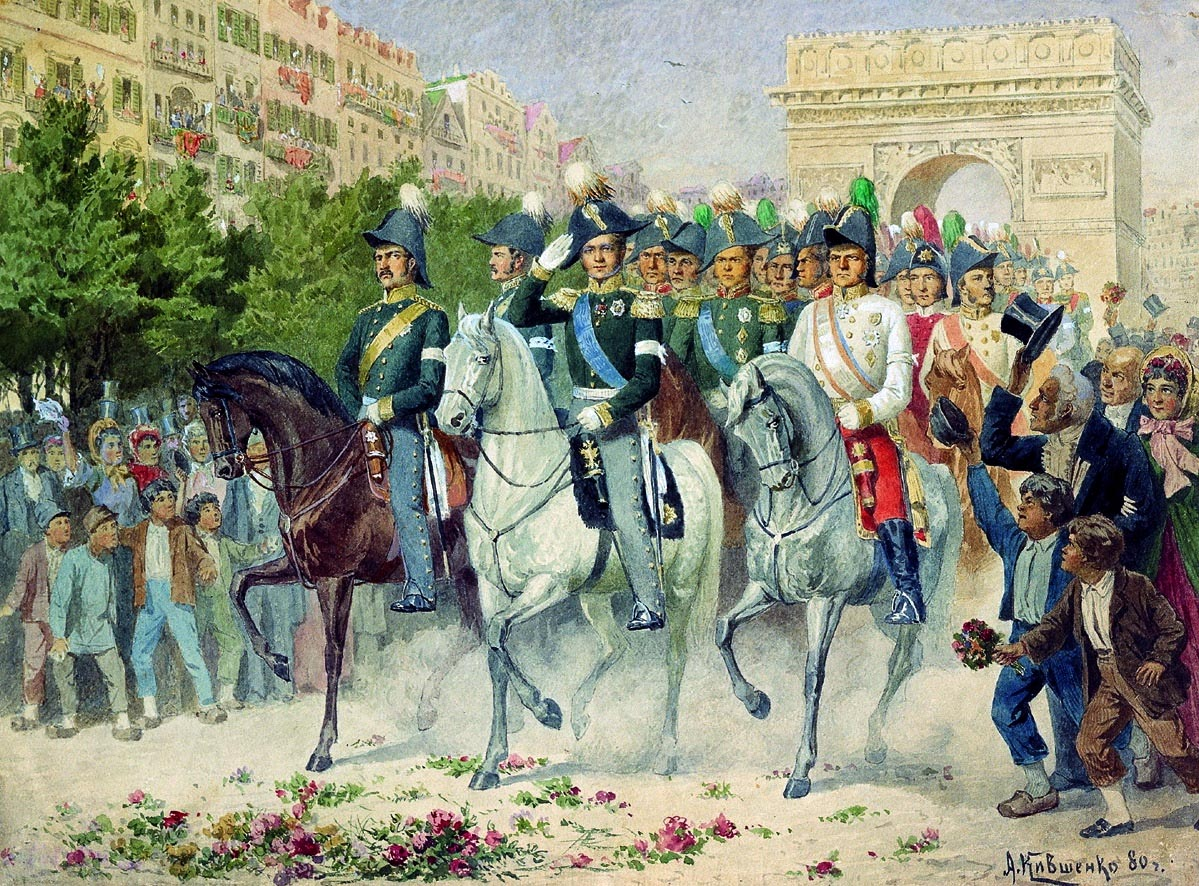
Arrival of the allies in Paris

The piece was probably already well known around 1800 in Frankfurt am Main. On 31 March 1814, it was played in the presence of Emperor Francis I of Austria, Tsar Alexander I, and King Friedrich Wilhelm III during the expedition of the allied troops in Paris at the end of the War of the Sixth Coalition.

Due to its title, the march became popular during the time of the German Empire. In addition, later during the Weimar Republic and still later in Nazi Germany, it was a popular symbol of French–German enmity.

In 1940, after the victory of the German armed forces over France, the march was played, as in 1814, during the formal entry of the German troops into Paris. Abroad, it is particularly popular in Russia, where it has formed part of the traditional repertoire of the country's military music since 1814.
