= Reginald Hands =

South African cricketer & England international rugby union player

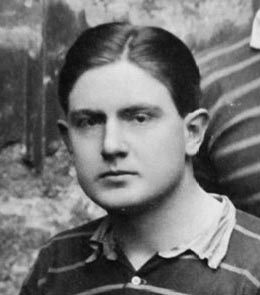

Personal information
- Born: 26 July 1888; Claremont, Cape Town, Cape Colony
- Died: 20 April 1918 (aged 29); Boulogne, Pas-de-Calais, France
- Batting: Right-handed
- Relatives: Philip Hands (brother); Kenneth Hands (brother)

International information
- National side: South Africa
- Only Test: 27 February 1914 v England

Career statistics
Competition	Test	First-class
Matches	1	7
Runs scored	7	289
Batting average	3.50	28.90
100s/50s	0/0	0/2
Top score	7	79*
Catches/stumpings	0/–	7/–
- Source: Cricinfo, 13 November 2022

Reginald Harry Myburgh Hands (26 July 1888 – 20 April 1918) was a South African cricketer who played in one Test match in February 1914. He died in France as a result of injuries sustained on the Western Front during the First World War. His death was an indirect cause of the tradition of the two-minute silence, instigated by his father Sir Harry Hands when Mayor of Cape Town.

== Biography ==
Reginald Hands was born in Claremont, Cape Town, South Africa, son of Sir Harry Hands KBE and Lady Aletta Hands (née Myburgh) OBE and elder brother of Philip Hands and Kenneth Hands. He was educated at Diocesan College, Rondebosch from 1899 to 1907. He won the Jamieson prize for the best all-round sportsman at the college in 1906. He went up to University College, Oxford, in 1907 as a Rhodes Scholar, earned a degree in jurisprudence and became a lawyer, being called to the bar (Middle Temple) in May 1911.

Hands played as a South African cricketer in one Test match in February 1914. Not surprisingly given the period, his entire first-class cricket career lasted just 15 months, in which time he played a few matches for Western Province in the Currie Cup (1912–13) and against the visiting the MCC led by J. W. H. T. Douglas (1913–14). During that English tour, Hands made his only Test appearance in the fifth match of the series, played at Port Elizabeth. A useful right-handed batsman, he scored 0 and 7 in a match won convincingly by the visitors by 10 wickets. He was dismissed stumped in both innings. No mention of his representative appearance was made in his Wisden obituary, nor that his brother, P. A. M. Hands, also played in that same Test.

Reginald Hands was also a talented rugby forward and played two international matches for England in 1910 against France and Scotland, as well as playing for Blackheath and Manchester. He (along with his two brothers, also Rhodes Scholars) had previously won his rugby blues at Oxford University in 1908 and 1909.

At the outbreak of the first Great War he joined the Imperial Light Horse and went with them to German South West Africa (now Namibia). He transferred to SA Heavy Artillery and was posted to the Western Front, where he was seconded to the Royal Garrison Artillery. He was promoted to captain and became second in command of his battery. During the Germans' final large offensive, begun on 21 March 1918, he was gassed, and succumbed to the effects of gas poisoning while off-duty and seemingly safe behind Allied lines, dying aged just 29 on 20 April 1918 at Boulogne-sur-Mer, France. At the time of his death, he was serving in the 73rd Siege Battery under Major Walter Brydon, who died about a week earlier.

His death was one of the indirect causes of the tradition of the two-minute silence, instigated by his father when Mayor of Cape Town.

Reginald Hands was awarded the 1914–15 Star, the British War Medal and the Victory Medal for his military service. He is buried in Boulogne Eastern Cemetery, Pas de Calais, France [Grave VII. A. 39].

At his old school, every year a boy is awarded the Hands Memorial Essay Prize.

== See also ==
- List of international rugby union players killed in action during the First World War

== Sources ==
- World Cricketers - A Biographical Dictionary by Christopher Martin-Jenkins published by Oxford University Press (1996)
- The Wisden Book of Test Cricket, Volume 1 (1877–1977) compiled and edited by Bill Frindall published by Headline Book Publishing (1995)
- Who's Who of Cricketers by Philip Bailey, Philip Thorn & Peter Wynne-Thomas published by Hamlyn (1993)
- www.cricketarchive.com/Archive/Players
- The Complete Who's Who of England Rugby Union Internationals by Raymond Maule published by Breedon Books Publishing Company Ltd. (1992)
- Taylor, Anton, "Honouring a Century of Silence", The Old Diocesan, Vol.1, (March 2018), pp. 58–60.
