= Remembrance Sunday =

Day to commemorate war dead

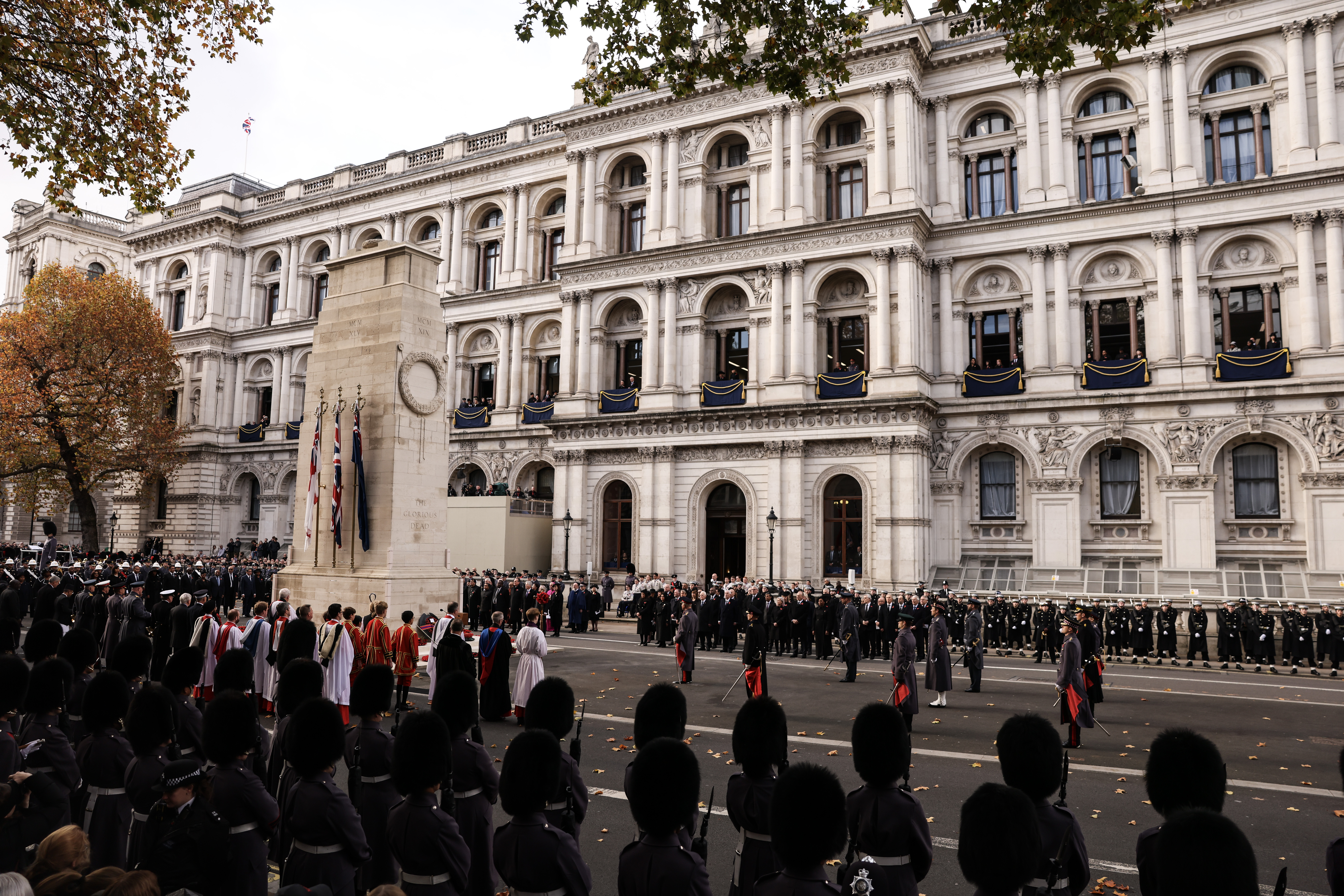
- The Cenotaph Sunday 2025
- Official name: Remembrance Sunday
- Observed by: United Kingdom
- Liturgical color: (Red or green, or purple for a Requiem Eucharist)
- Type: International
- Observances: Parades, silences
- Date: Second Sunday in November
- 2025 date: November 9
- 2026 date: November 8
- 2027 date: November 14
- 2028 date: November 12
- Frequency: Annual
- Related to: Remembrance Day and Armistice Day

Remembrance Sunday is held in the United Kingdom as a day to commemorate the contribution of British and Commonwealth military and civilian service people in the two World Wars and later conflicts. It is held on the second Sunday in November (the Sunday nearest to 11 November, Armistice Day, the anniversary of the end of hostilities in World War I in 1918). Remembrance Sunday, within the Church of England, falls in the liturgical period of Allsaintstide.

It is marked by ceremonies at local war memorials in most cities, towns and villages, attended by civic dignitaries, ex-servicemen and -women (many are members of the Royal British Legion and other veterans' organisations), members of local armed forces regular and reserve units (Royal Navy and Royal Naval Reserve, Royal Marines and Royal Marines Reserve, Army and Territorial Army, Royal Air Force and Royal Auxiliary Air Force), military cadet forces (Sea Cadet Corps, Army Cadet Force and Air Training Corps as well as the Combined Cadet Force) and youth organisations (e.g. Scouts, Boys' Brigade, Girls' Brigade and Guides). Representatives of the Judiciary also lay wreaths at local war memorials throughout the country. Wreaths of remembrance poppies are laid on the memorials, and two minutes' silence is held at 11 am. Church bells are usually rung half-muffled, creating a sombre effect. The overall ceremony, including parades, service and wreath laying, typically lasts about two hours.

== History ==
The focus of remembrance for the dead of the First World War originally fell on Armistice Day itself, commencing in 1919. As well as the National Service in London, events were staged at town and village war memorials, often featuring processions of civic dignitaries and veterans.

The first UK commemoration of the end of the First World War took place at Buckingham Palace, with King George V hosting a "Banquet in Honour of The President of the French Republic" in the evening of 10 November 1919. The first official Armistice Day events were subsequently held in the grounds of the Palace on the morning of 11 November 1919, which included a two-minute silence at 11am as a mark of respect for those who died in the war and those left behind. While the initial, spontaneous public reaction when the Armistice was signed on 11 November 1918 was jubilation and celebration, the 1919 banquet was criticised for being too celebratory.

The following year, Armistice Day in 1920, the funeral of the Unknown Soldier took place at the London Cenotaph and a two-minute silence was observed throughout the nation. Buses halted, electricity was cut to tram lines, and even trading on the London Stock Exchange halted.

Starting in 1921, the Royal British Legion began selling Remembrance poppies to raise funds for ex-servicemen. Throughout the 1920s and 1930s, the character of the remembrance events became politicised. While for some, Armistice Day was a day for recognising the horrors of war, never to be repeated; for others the day symbolised the honour of military service.

A Christian Pacifist MP was elected to parliament in 1923. In the mid-1930s the Peace Pledge Union gained wide support. Pacifism gained great publicity from a 1933 student debate in the Oxford University Union that voted for a resolution that "this House will in no circumstances fight for King and Country". The first white poppies were sold by the Co-operative Women's Guild in 1933.

During the Second World War, the commemorations were moved to the Sunday preceding 11 November as an emergency measure to avoid disruption of the production of vital war materials.

In May 1945, just before VE Day, the new government began consultation with the churches and the British Legion on the future of remembrance. Armistice Day in 1945 fell on a Sunday, preventing the need to change wartime practices. Some thought that continuing with 11 November would focus more on the First World War and downplay the importance of the Second. Other dates suggested were 8 May (VE Day), 6 June (D-Day), 15 August (VJ Day), 3 September (the declaration of war), and even 15 June (the signing of Magna Carta in 1215). The Archbishop of Westminster proposed that the second Sunday in November should be named Remembrance Sunday in commemoration of both World Wars, a suggestion which was endorsed by the Home Office in January 1946. In June of that year, the prime minister, Clement Attlee, announced in the House of Commons that "the Government felt that this view would commend itself to all quarters of the country. I am glad to say that it has now found general acceptance here and has been approved by The King", although in 1956 a decision was announced aiming to avoid the uncertainty of observing Remembrance Sunday "sometimes on the first, and sometimes on the second Sunday in November", with Queen Elizabeth II approving a fixed rule of holding the observation on the second Sunday in the month.

== National ceremony in the United Kingdom ==
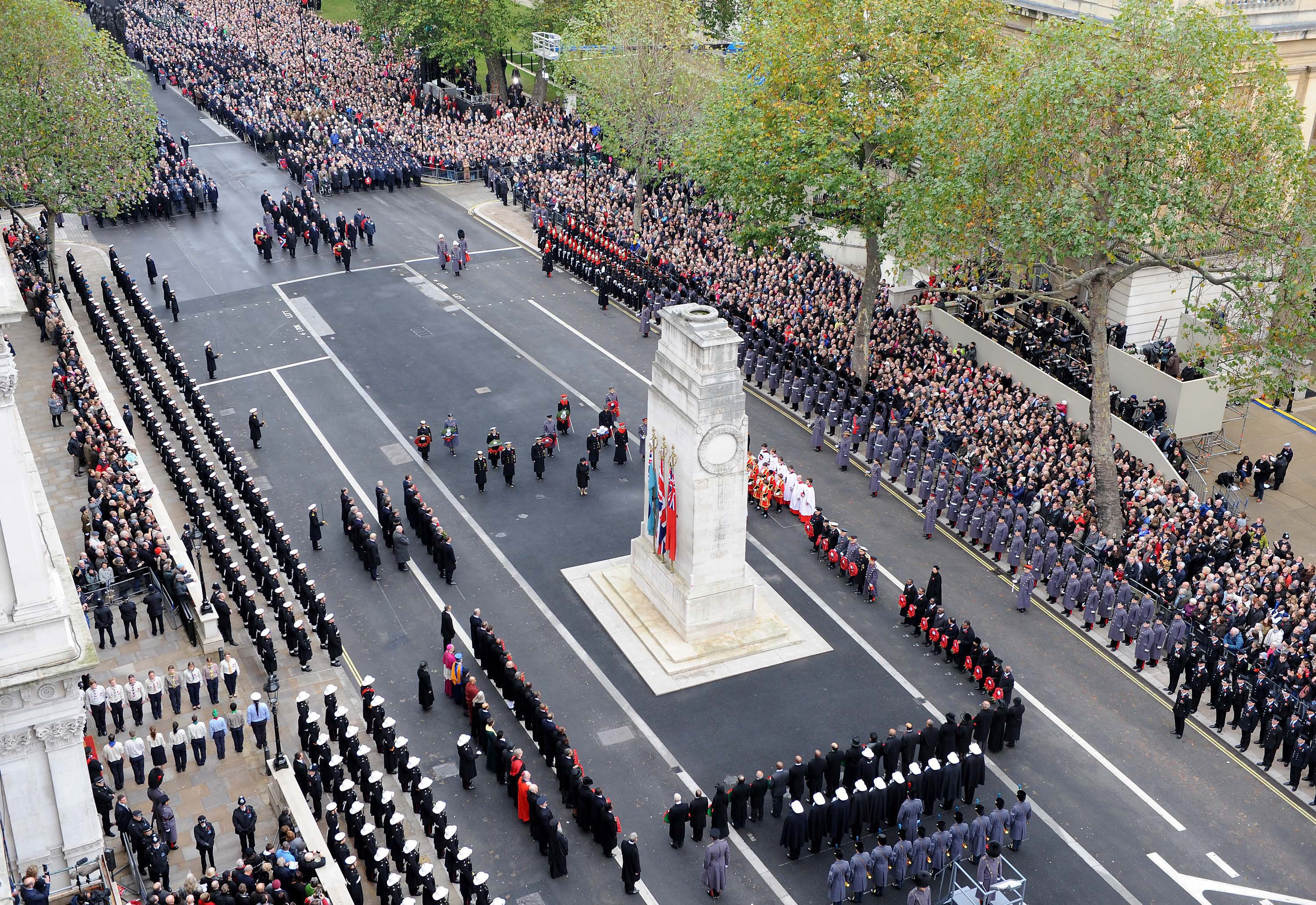
The ceremony at the Cenotaph

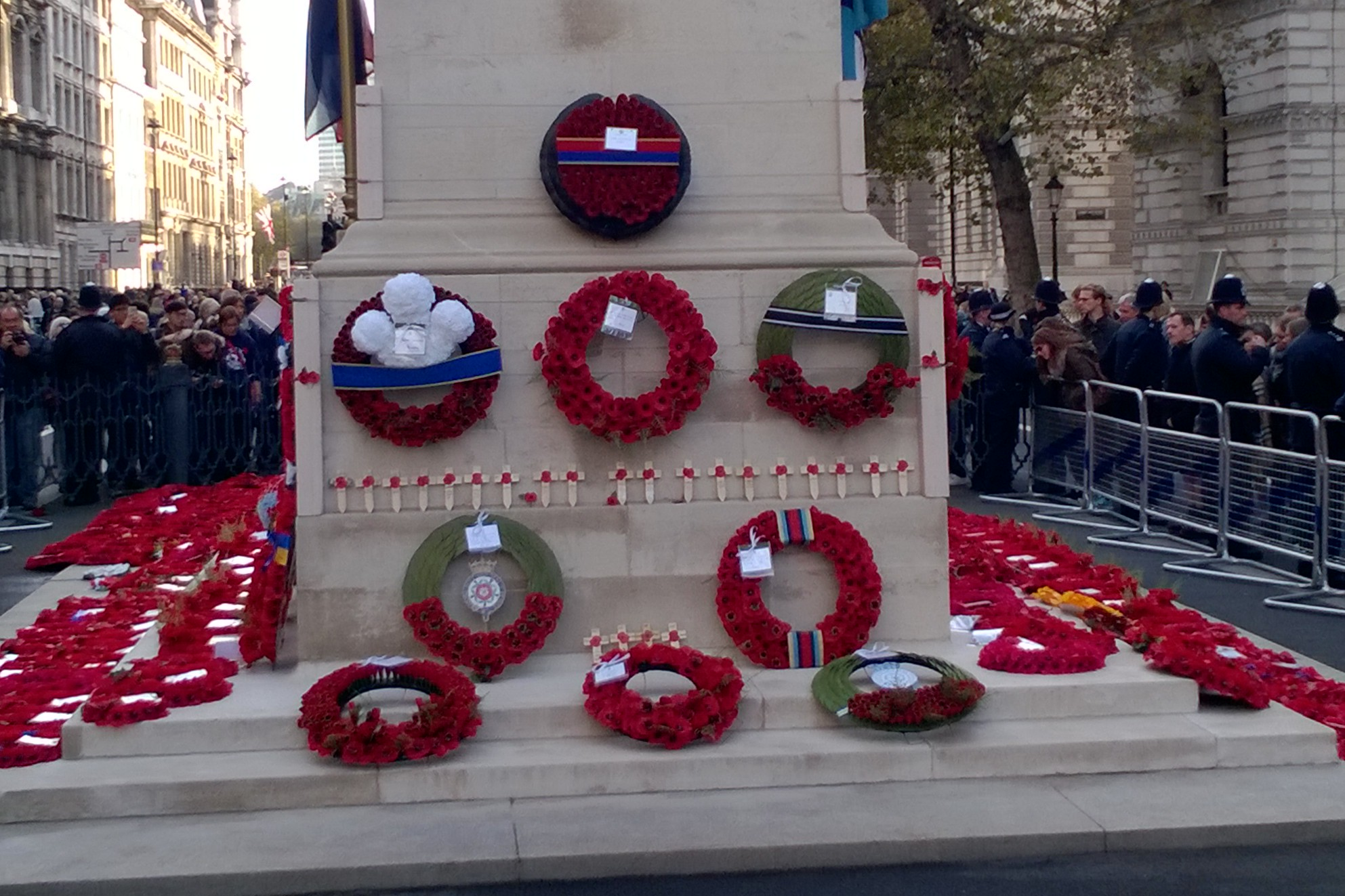
Group of wreaths laid during the Remembrance Sunday ceremony in London

The national ceremony is held in London at the Cenotaph on Whitehall, starting with two minutes' silence at 11am and concluding with the end of The Nation's Thank You procession at 1:30 p.m. The main part of the ceremony consists of the laying of wreaths by members of the royal family and other dignitaries, a service of remembrance with prayers and a hymn. It is immediately followed by a march past by thousands of ex-service personnel and contingents from other organisations. Marchers salute the Cenotaph as they pass and wreaths are handed over to be laid around it. Typically, there are approximately 10,000 marchers.

== Regional and local ceremonies ==
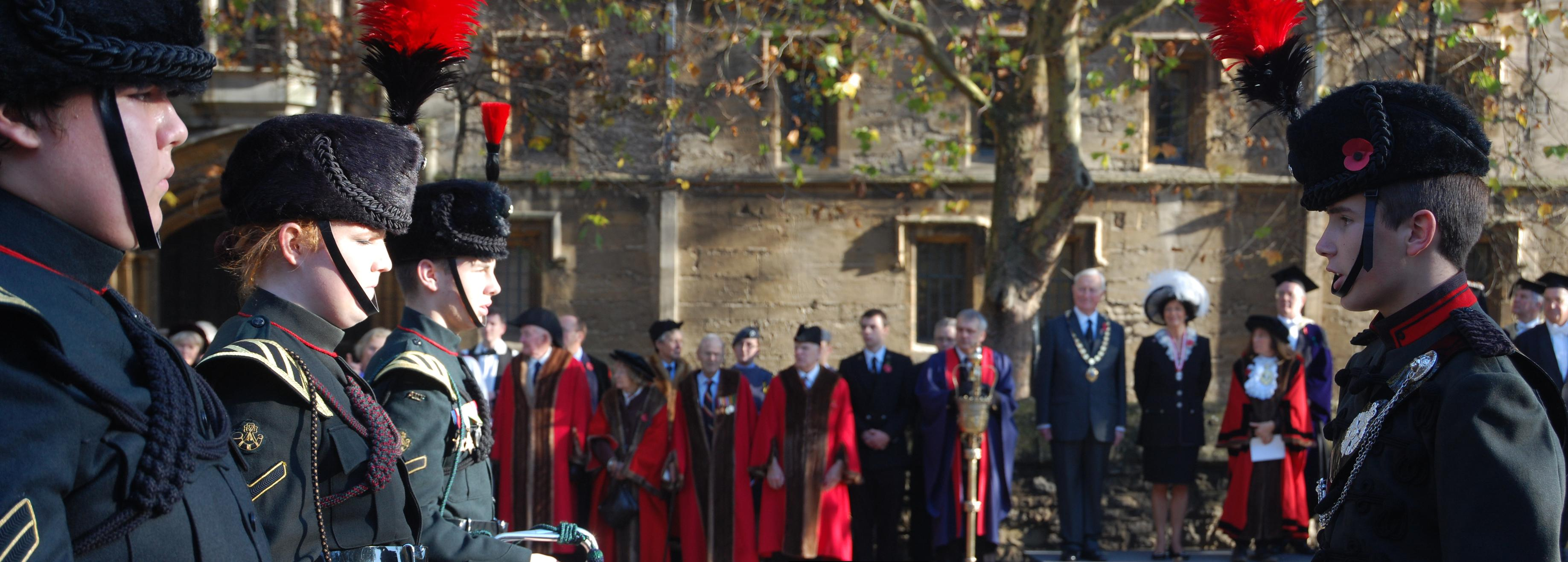
The Remembrance Sunday parade in Oxford in 2011.

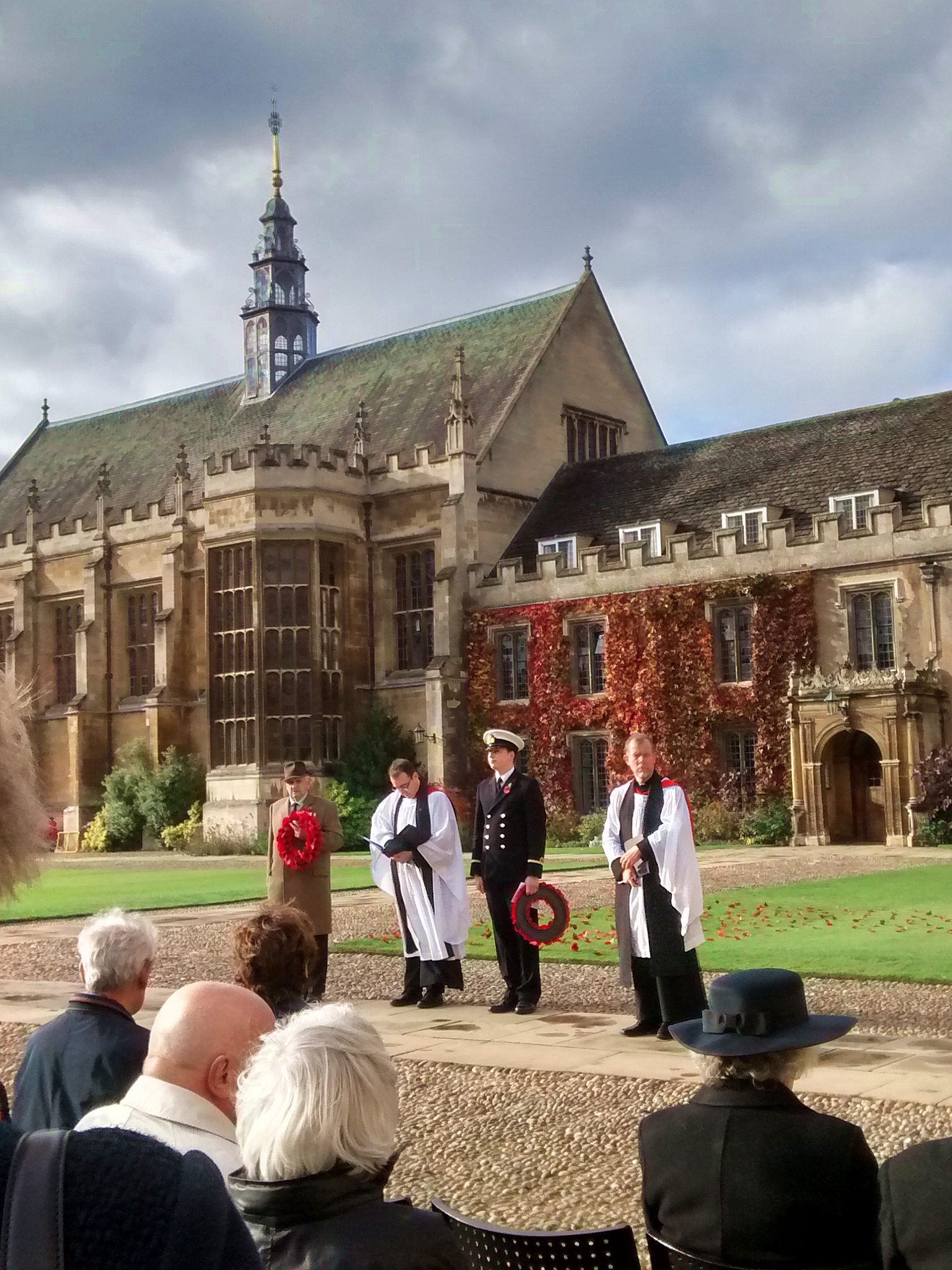
Remembrance Service at Trinity College, Cambridge in 2018.

Significant ceremonies also take place in the capitals of the nations and across the regions of the United Kingdom. Most notably at the Scottish National War Memorial, in Edinburgh in the grounds of Edinburgh Castle, the Welsh National War Memorial in Cardiff and at the Northern Ireland War Memorial and Cenotaph in Belfast in the grounds of the Belfast City Hall.

Typically, poppy wreaths are laid by representatives of the Crown, the armed forces, and local civic leaders, as well as by local organisations such as ex-service organisations, cadet forces, the Scouts, Guides, Boys' Brigade, St John Ambulance and The Salvation Army. The start and end of the silence is often also marked by the firing of an artillery piece. A minute's or two minutes' silence is also frequently incorporated into church services.

A common criticism of Remembrance Sunday ceremonies and the Royal British Legion is that by focusing only on veterans and military persons who have died, the vast majority of the casualties of war (civilians) are forgotten.

== British Overseas Territories ==
In the past, the Secretary of State for Foreign and Commonwealth Affairs laid a wreath on behalf of all the British Overseas Territories. However, since 2001 there has been a campaign by Britain's Overseas Territories Association for the right to lay a wreath themselves at the annual service at the Cenotaph. In 2008 the Labour Government agreed that one wreath could be laid for all 14 territories by a representative of the territories.

== Northern Ireland ==
In Northern Ireland, Remembrance Sunday has tended to be associated with unionists. Most Irish nationalists and republicans do not take part in the public commemoration of British soldiers organised by the Royal British Legion. This is partly due to the actions of the British Army during The Troubles and its role in fighting against Irish independence. However, some moderate nationalists have attended Remembrance Day events as a way to connect with the unionist community. In 1987 a bomb was detonated by the Provisional Irish Republican Army (IRA) just before a Remembrance Sunday ceremony in Enniskillen, killing twelve people. The IRA said it had made a mistake and had been targeting soldiers parading to the war memorial. Ireland has its own National Day of Commemoration in July for all Irish people who died in war.

In 2024, the First Minister Michelle O'Neill laid a wreath at a ceremony in Belfast.

== Other ceremonies ==
From 1919 until 1945, Armistice Day observance was always on 11 November itself. It was then moved to Remembrance Sunday, but since the 50th anniversary of the end of the Second World War in 1995, it has become usual to hold ceremonies on both Armistice Day and Remembrance Sunday.

In 2006, then Chancellor of the Exchequer Gordon Brown proposed that in addition to Remembrance Sunday, a new national day to celebrate the achievements of veterans should be instituted. The "Veterans Day", to be held in the summer, would be similar to Veterans Day celebrations in the United States. This has now been renamed "Armed Forces Day", to include currently serving troops to Service families, and from veterans to cadets. The first "Armed Forces Day" was held on 27 June 2009.

Submariners hold an additional remembrance walk and ceremony on the Sunday before Remembrance Sunday, which has The Submariners Memorial on London's Victoria Embankment as its focal point.

== Outside the United Kingdom ==
Outside the United Kingdom Anglican and Church of Scotland churches often have a commemorative service on Remembrance Sunday. In the Republic of Ireland there is a service in St Patrick's Cathedral, Dublin, the Church of Ireland's national cathedral. Since 1993 the President of Ireland has attended this service. The state has its own National Day of Commemoration in July for all Irish men and women who have died in war. In the United States it is celebrated by many Anglo-Catholic churches in the Episcopal Church. The Anglican Church of Korea also celebrates the day to commemorate, in particular, the Commonwealth soldiers who fought in the Korean War with a service at the Seoul Anglican Cathedral.

In New Zealand an attempt was made to change Armistice Day to Remembrance Sunday after World War II but it was a failure, partly owing to competition from Anzac Day.

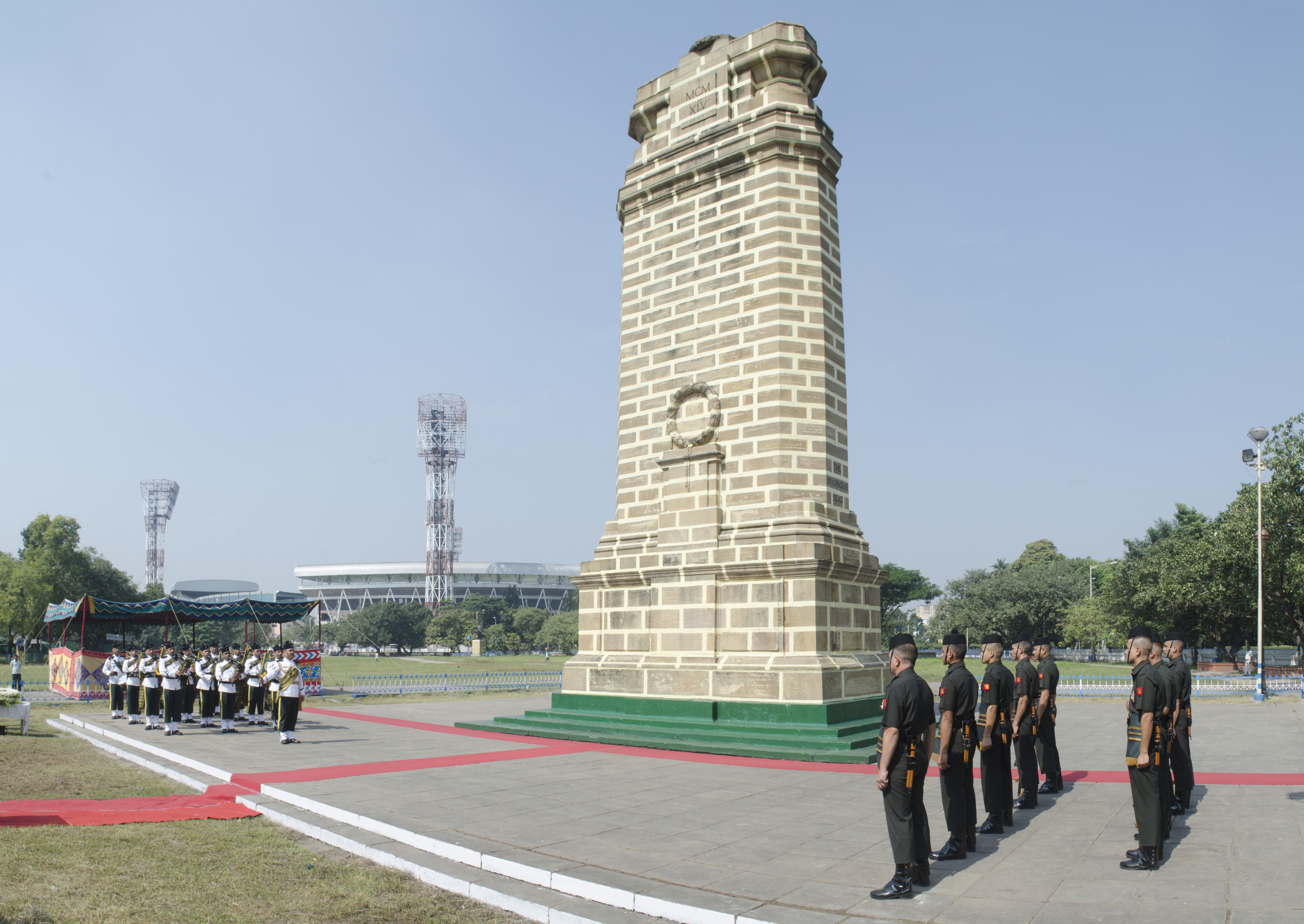
Remembrance Sunday Commemoration at the Glorious Dead Cenotaph in Kolkata, India, 2016

Every year, the British Deputy High Commission in Kolkata, India, organises a Remembrance Sunday Commemoration at the Glorious Dead Cenotaph in the Maidan.

== Poppies ==
Remembrance poppies are a traditional symbol of Remembrance Sunday; they may be worn individually on clothing, made into wreaths, or attached to small wooden picket crosses. These remembrance poppies are sold by the Royal British Legion during their annual Poppy Appeal campaign in October and November to raise money for their charitable work helping the UK Armed Forces community.

It is a common theme in British tabloid journalism in October and November to "expose" politicians and celebrities who have chosen not to wear a red Royal British Legion poppy. Critics have labelled this "poppy fascism", as persons who refuse to wear poppies on TV or at sporting events have received death threats.

== See also ==
- Festival of Remembrance (Performance in the Royal Albert Hall on the Saturday before Remembrance Sunday)
- National Service of Remembrance
- Remembrance Day
- Remembrance poppy
- Two-minute silence
