= Sonnerie aux morts =

Funeral-related French bugle call

"La Sonnerie aux Morts" is a bugle call of the French Armed Forces used at funerals and the commemoration of battles and wars.

== History ==
Struck by the impact that the Last Post, of the UK and the Commonwealth of Nations, and Taps, of the United States, had on ceremonies and their participants, General Gouraud took the initiative to call by the head of the music of the Republican Guard, Major Pierre Dupont, and requested a composition of an appropriate bugle call.

La Sonnerie aux Morts was played for the first time at a ceremony for the rekindling of the eternal flame at the Arc de Triomphe on 14 July 1931.

== See also ==
- "Last Post" the equivalent of the United Kingdom, Canada, Australia, New Zealand and other Commonwealth countries.
- "Taps", the United States Armed Forces equivalent
- "Der gute Kamerad" ("The good Comrade"), the German and Austrian equivalent for military funerals
- "Il Silenzio" ("Silence"), the Italian equivalent
- "La muerte no es el final" ("Death is not the end"), the Spanish Armed Forces equivalent
- "Reveille", the bugle call sounded at sunrise
- "The Rouse"
