= Military funeral =

Memorial or burial rite given by a country's military

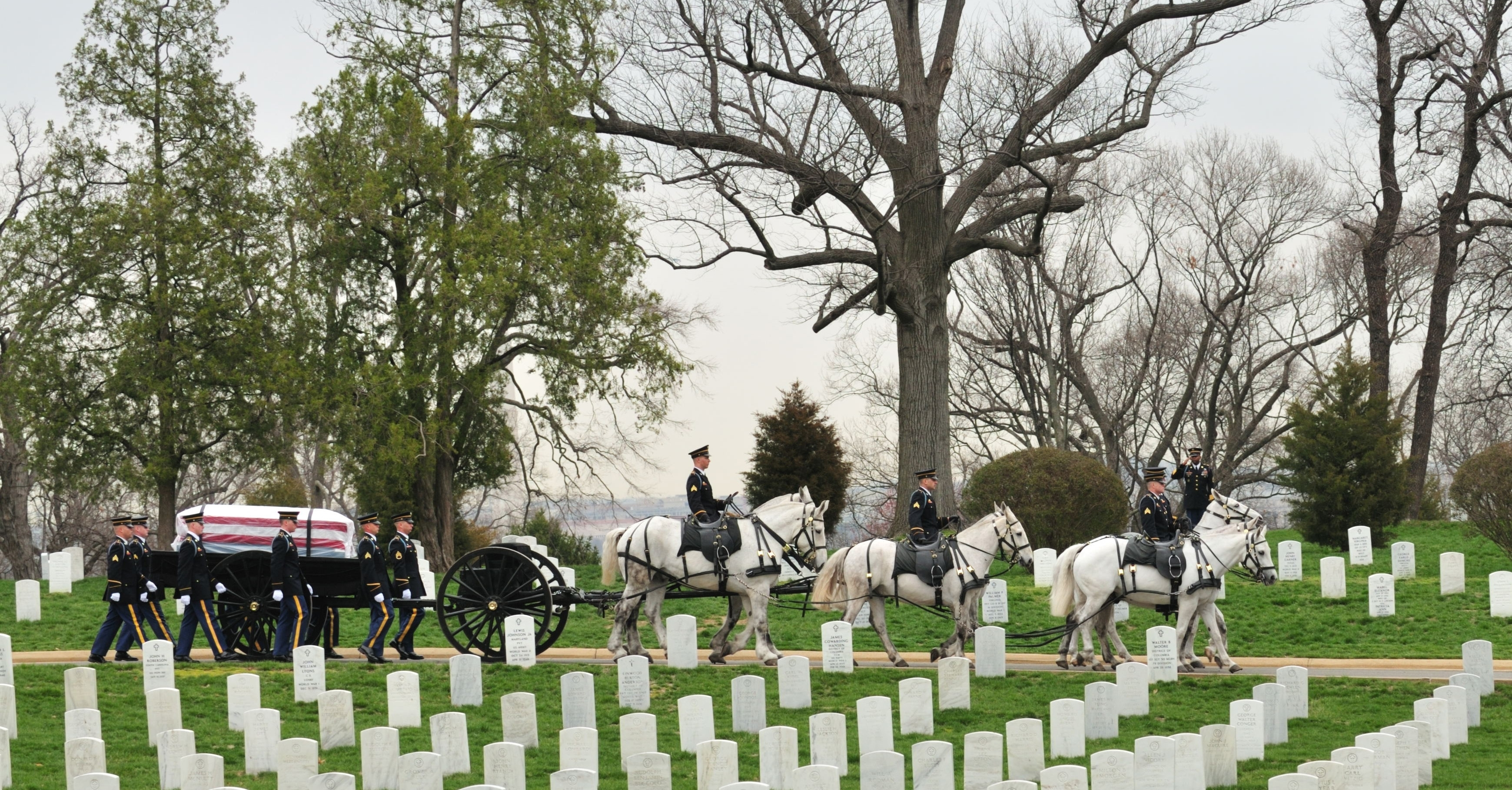
The United States Army Caisson Platoon of the 3rd United States Infantry Regiment "The Old Guard" transports the flag-draped casket of Sergeant Major of the Army George W. Dunaway on a horse-drawn limbers and caissons during a military funeral procession at Arlington National Cemetery, 2008.

A military funeral is a memorial or burial rite given by a country's military for a soldier, sailor, marine or airman who died in battle, a veteran, or other prominent military figures or heads of state. A military funeral may feature guards of honor, the firing of volley shots as a salute, drumming and other military elements, with a flag draping over the coffin.

== Canada ==
Canadian military funerals involve many rituals seen in other parts of the world. The Royal Canadian Horse Artillery use a 25-pounder gun and limber as the funeral vehicle. Muffled drums accompany the graveside processional. The deceased's headdress, insignia and medals are borne on a velvet cushion into the funeral service. Volleys are fired over the grave when the body is interred. Countries in the Commonwealth duplicate the British military drill and ceremony. The Canadian funeral described above typifies the funerary service. The bugle tunes Last Post and The Rouse are played as the body is interred.

Despite being a police force and not a branch of the military, the Royal Canadian Mounted Police was given battle honours as if were a dragoon regiment by King George V in 1921 in recognition of its members who served in the Boer and Great Wars. The RCMP therefore performs military-style "regimental funerals" for members and officers killed in the line of duty and retired members and officers with exceptional records of service.

An RCMP regimental funeral will typically include a procession, a church service or public service, and either an interment or graveside ceremony for burials or chapel ceremony for cremations. The procession includes a charger (a riderless horse), a bearer party commander, eight casket bearers, an insignia bearer if there are insignia to be borne, two headdress bearer, honorary pallbearers, a gun carriage or hearse. Dress is "review order" (Red Serge and Stetson). The RCMP's guidon may be present and if so is draped on a military drum for the procession. The casket may be draped with the national flag of Canada, the Union Jack, or the RCMP ensign. Other police forces in Canada also refer to funerals for their officers in this way, as "regimental funerals", despite not, in fact, being military regiments even ceremonially.

== Chile ==
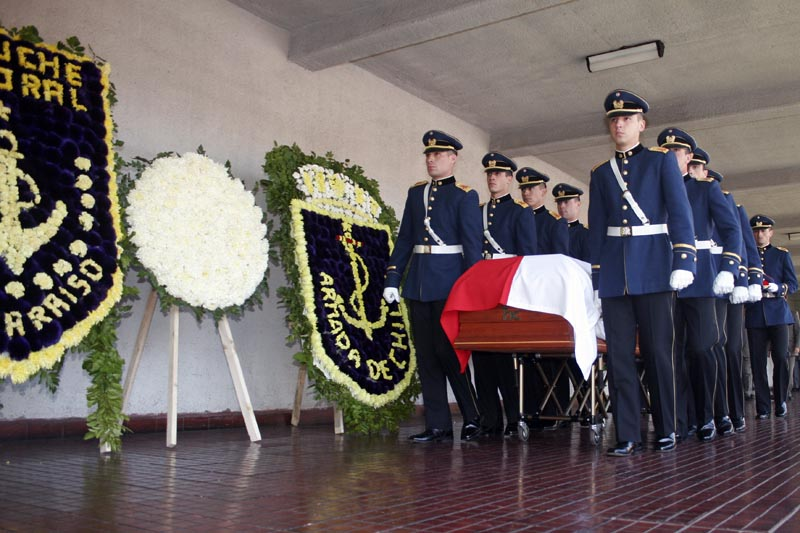
Chilean Army cadets carrying the coffin of general Augusto Pinochet.

In Chilean military funerals, the German song "Ich hatt' einen Kameraden" is sung in its Spanish version ("Yo tenía un camarada"). The casket may or may not be horse-drawn on a caisson. A bugler sounds the final honors during interment.

When the coffin enters the tomb, a fireteam executes a salvo. If for a general or flag officer, the 1st Artillery Regiment "Tacna" fires a three-volley gun salute.

== Germany ==
In Germany, the coffin is covered by a "Bundesdienstflage" (Federal service flag) the eagle facing to the right, looking to the head of the deceased. At the level of the head of the deceased, a headdress (helmet, cap, mountain cap, beret), opening downwards, shield/edge pointing to the head of the coat of arms eagle is attached to the coffin. Since, according to German ceremonial, the coffin is lowered into the grave enveloped in the flag, a second flag is carried separately for the purpose of handing it over to the family. Ludwig Uhland's song "Ich hatt' einen Kameraden" is an integral part of a military funeral. It is played when the coffin is lowered into the grave, military personnel will perform a salute.

== Indonesia ==
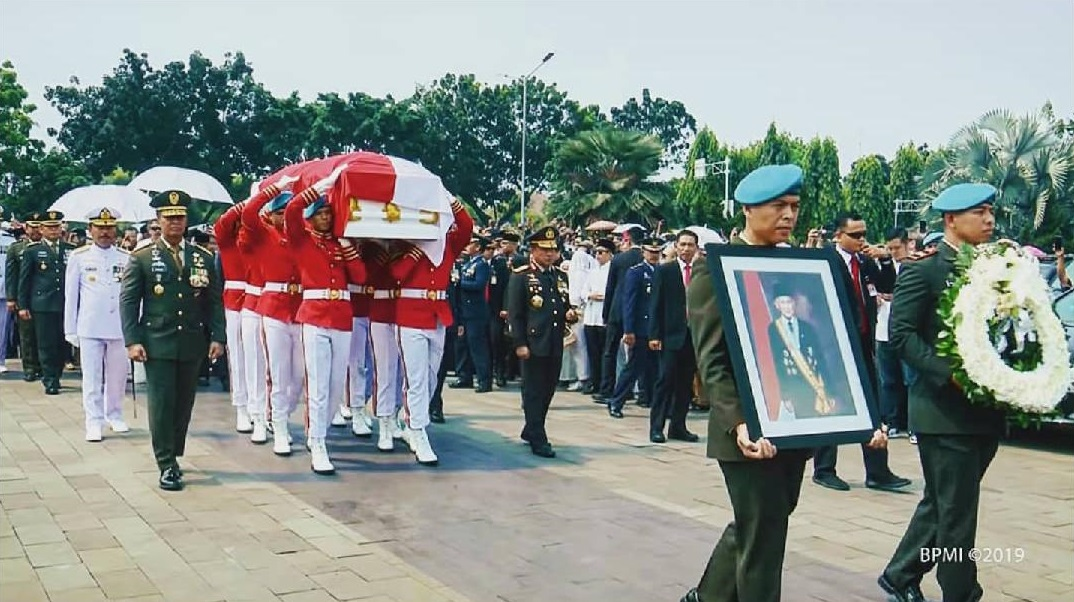
State Funeral procession of President B. J. Habibie, Jakarta - 12 September 2019. The casket is carried by Paspampres honor guardsmen and is accompanied by the Military chief of staffs and the INP chief

In Indonesia, military funerals are generally given only either towards retired personnel of the Indonesian National Armed Forces who served in domestic operations or in international peacekeeping operations or retired guerrillas and/or soldiers of the Indonesian National Revolution, especially those holding the "Bintang Gerilya (Star of the Guerrilla)" order, or to active personnel killed while on active duty service. Exceptional politicians and Ministers have the option for such a funeral, but most opt for a more intimate religious one. During the occasion of a state funeral, it is obligatory for a military funeral to be conducted, preceded by a final religious service before the funeral march begins. A three-volley salute is the norm done by a squad seven soldiers occasionally a mixture of Armed Forces or Police personnel dependent on their career. The Honour drill team surrounding the burial site is a platoon-size or company formation and the larger the platoon or company, the more illustrious the departed. Prayers are led by representatives of the person's religious faith. Similar traditions also exist in the Indonesian National Police.

See here: Indonesian Military Funeral Video Sample

During the funeral ceremony, the presiding officer of the ceremony reads a message of remembrance in the name of the government and people of Indonesia, as well as his/her chosen uniformed organization in which he/she served, preceded by a reading of the person's life and achievements, as well as of his/her military/police service record (if any). The text is as follows:

In the name of and on behalf of the people and nation and the (states uniformed organization), I, (states name, rank and billet of appointment), together with (states names of co-presiding officer) hereby present to you (states name of deceased, with rank, number and last appointment held), born as a son/daughter to (states name of father), and who, on (states date of death) in the (states name of hospital/place of death) passed away in the interests and dignity of the Nation and our people, who today is now being interred in the soils of our Motherland.
May his/her spirit be now led on the journey to Paradise/Heaven and may on the path of Holy Devotion his/her memory and legacy be to us a guide and inspiration.
(date of funeral and place of burial)
(name of presiding officer, rank and billet of appointment)

== Italy ==
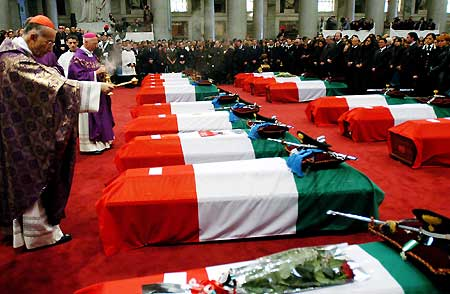
State funeral for soldiers killed during the Nasiriyah bombing, celebrated by Cardinal Camillo Ruini in the Basilica of Saint Paul Outside the Walls, 18 November 2003

In Italy the members of the Armed Forces who died in the line of duty are granted a state funeral by decree of the prime minister. So the funeral follows the protocol of a state funeral, and in particular the six officers in high uniform who carry the coffin are members of the same Armed Force of the departed.

== Poland ==
In Poland, the last fragment of Władysław Tarnowski's song Śpij, kolego ("Sleep, friend"), a portion of the larger composition Jak to na wojence ładnie (the title has no precise English translation, but it is roughly "how nice it is in war", with a diminutive form conveying a sense of ironic solidarity) is an integral part of a military funeral, played by a trumpeter. It is also played during state ceremonies. Also part of it is a three volley salute (salwa honorowa) with the firing party consisting of an armed platoon or company.

== Russia ==
In Russia, those eligible for military funerals are the distinguished veterans honorably discharged from service, servicemen killed in action or who otherwise perished during their active service, state dignitaries and some other categories of people who distinguished themselves in state service. The ritual includes the honor guard, the size of which depends on the deceased's rank and status and may vary from merely a squad to a full company, which escorts the departed to the hearse and from the hearse to the grave, with a special detachment to carry the deceased's awards. A military marching band accompanies the funeral procession as well, traditionally playing the "How glorious is our Lord" (an old Royal anthem from XVIII century) as the body is put on the hearse and the National Anthem of Russia during the salute after the actual burial. On special occasions the garrison commander may authorise the use of a gun carriage (horse or motor drawn at his discretion) instead of a traditional motor hearse (a gun carriage in a Continental style is traditionally used in Russia instead of a caisson preferred in the Anglosphere). A deceased's portrait is carried before the procession, followed by the funerary wreaths and the awards, with the pallbearers following them. All military personnel presented are required to stand at attention as a flag-wrapped casket passes them. Aside from a flag, a land or air forces veteran is buried with their regulation cap on the casket, while naval officers are also entitled to their ceremonial dirk and its sheath to be crossed on a casket cover. Russian Orthodox clergy say a memorial player for the deceased serviceman or woman. At the burial ground, the eulogy is first read, the flag is lowered and the band plays the funerary march as the casket is lowered into the grave, after which a three-volley salute is fired with blank rounds, followed by the performance of the national anthem by the band. An artillery gun salute may be authorised for a particularly important funeral for a general or flag officer.

== Spain ==
In Spain, the formed troops sing "La muerte no es el final": Death is not the End during funeral ceremonies and in all military ceremonies, when the fallen are being honored. The Spanish Legion has an exception: the regimental hymn Novio de la Muerte (Bridegroom of Death) is played in full instead during occasions that the Legion attends.

== United Kingdom ==
The British Army carries reversed arms at military funerals. The Last Post and Rouse or Reveille are sounded at the appropriate moment during the rite.

== United States ==
In the United States, the United States Army Military District of Washington (MDW) is responsible for providing military funerals. "Honoring Those Who Served" is the title of the program for instituting a dignified military funeral with full honors to the nation's veterans.

As of January 1, 2000, Section 578 of Public Law 106-65 of the National Defense Authorization Act mandates that the United States Armed Forces shall provide the rendering of honors in a military funeral for any eligible veteran if requested by their family. As mandated by federal law, an honor guard detail for the burial of an eligible veteran shall consist of no fewer than two members of the Armed Forces. One member of the detail shall be a representative of the parent armed service of the deceased veteran. The honor guard detail will, at a minimum, perform a ceremony that includes the folding and presenting of the flag of the United States to the next of kin and the playing of "Taps", which will be played by a lone bugler, if available, or by audio recording. Today, there are so few buglers available that the United States Armed Forces often cannot provide one. However, federal law allows Reserve and National Guard units to assist with funeral honors duty when necessary. On the day of the burial or interment, the U.S. Flag is lowered to half-staff.

== Other ==
- After the 2006 Lebanon war and during the Syrian civil war, Hezbollah draped coffins containing their dead in Hezbollah flags with flowers on top. They were given a funeral according to Shiite Muslim traditions, then buried in their hometowns.
- Irish Republican Army members have been awarded military funerals.
- On occasion, deceased soldiers have been accorded military funerals by their enemies (for example, see Manfred von Richthofen).

== Gallery ==
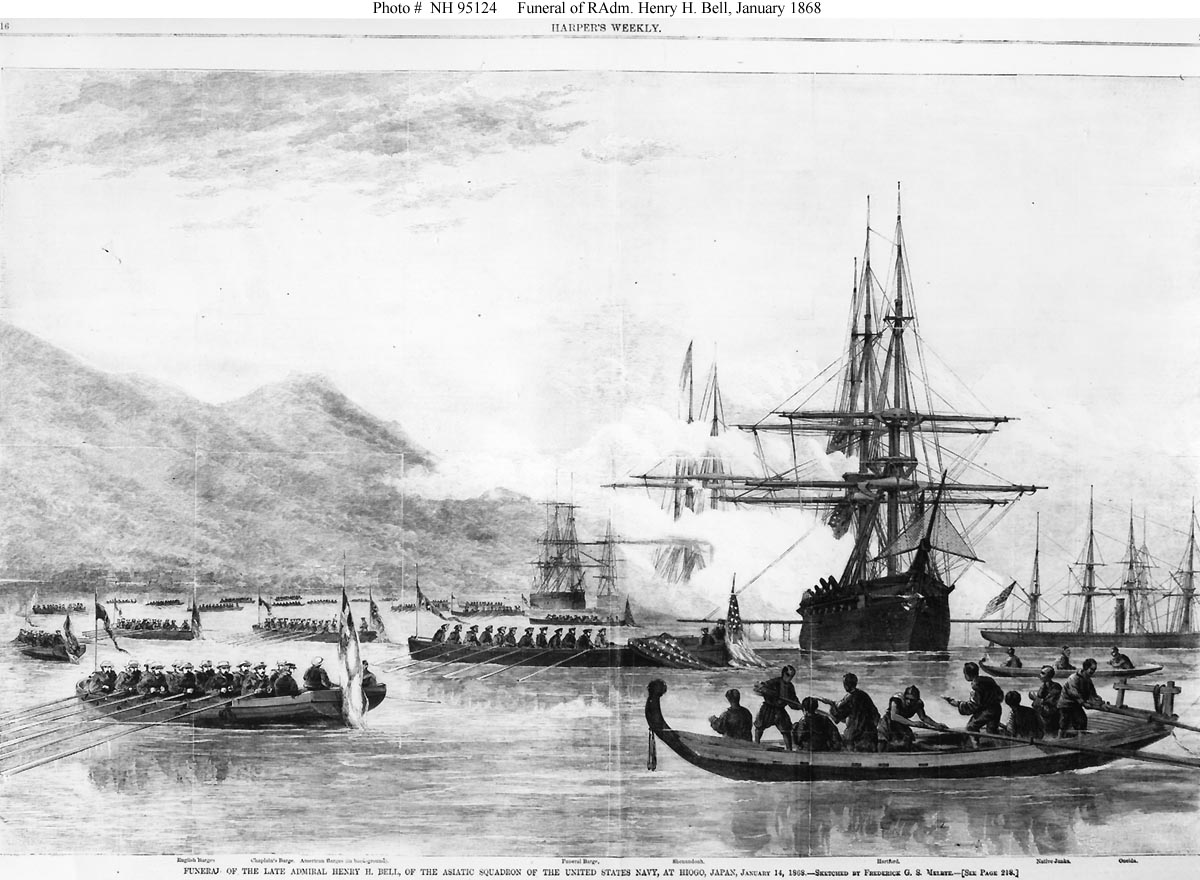
The military funeral of U.S. Navy Rear Admiral Henry H. Bell held in Hiogo, Japan on January 14, 1868.

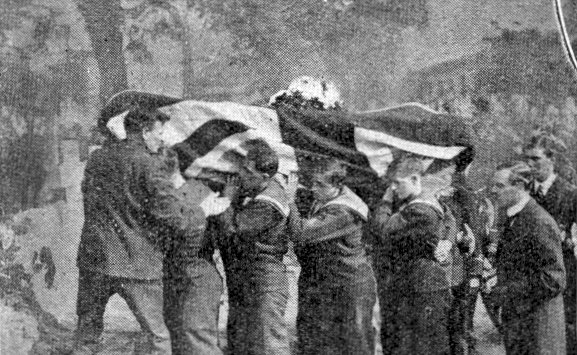
The coffin of Lieutenant Reginald Warneford being carried to his burial plot in Brompton Cemetery by members of the Royal Naval Division on June 21, 1915.

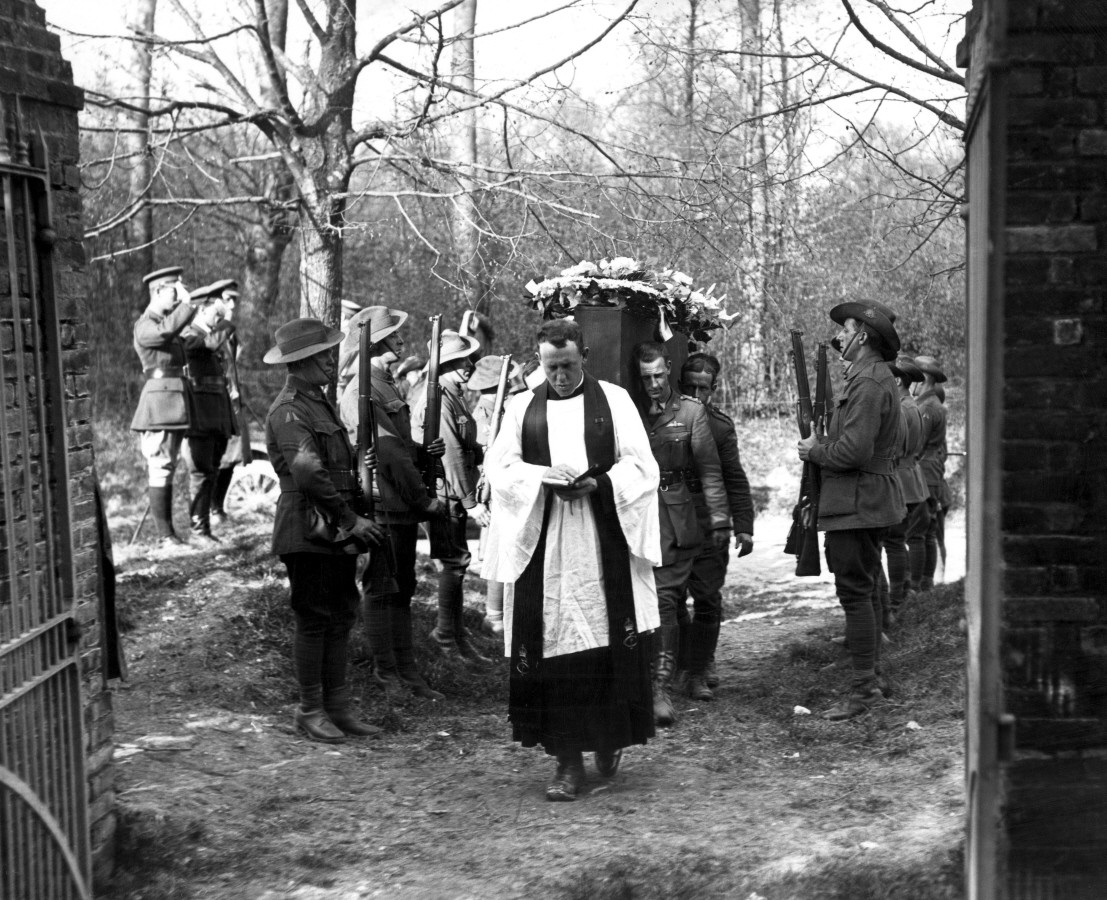
The military funeral of Manfred von Richthofen is presided by officers of No. 3 Squadron RAAF who carry his coffin in Bertangles Cemetery, France on April 22, 1918.

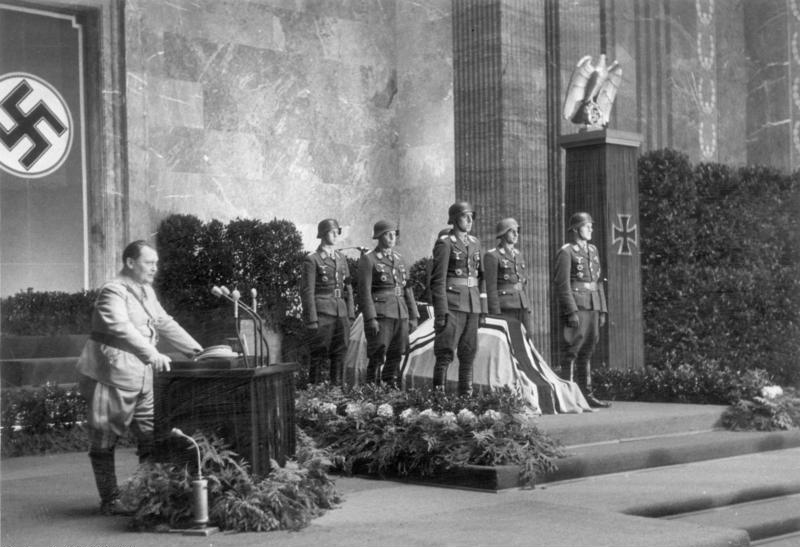
Luftwaffe Commander-in-Chief Hermann Göring giving a speech at the military funeral of Night fighter ace Lieutenant Colonel Helmut Lent, winner of the Oak Leaves with Swords and Diamonds to the Knight's Cross of the Iron Cross, October 1944.

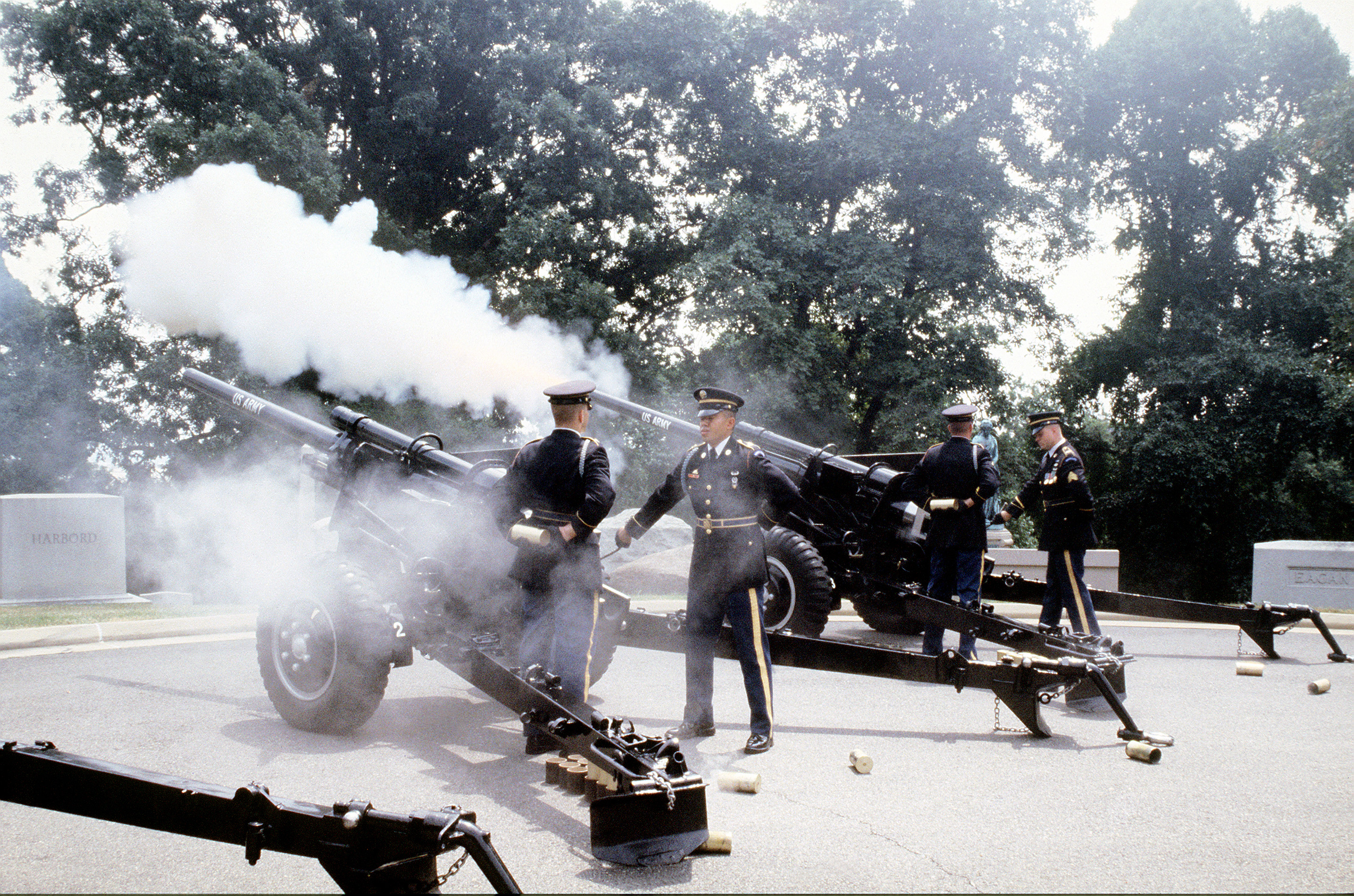
Members of the Presidential Salute Guns Battery of the 3rd United States Infantry Regiment "The Old Guard" render a gun salute using three-inch anti-tank guns (modified to 75mm caliber) during a military funeral held at Arlington National Cemetery on August 10, 1998.

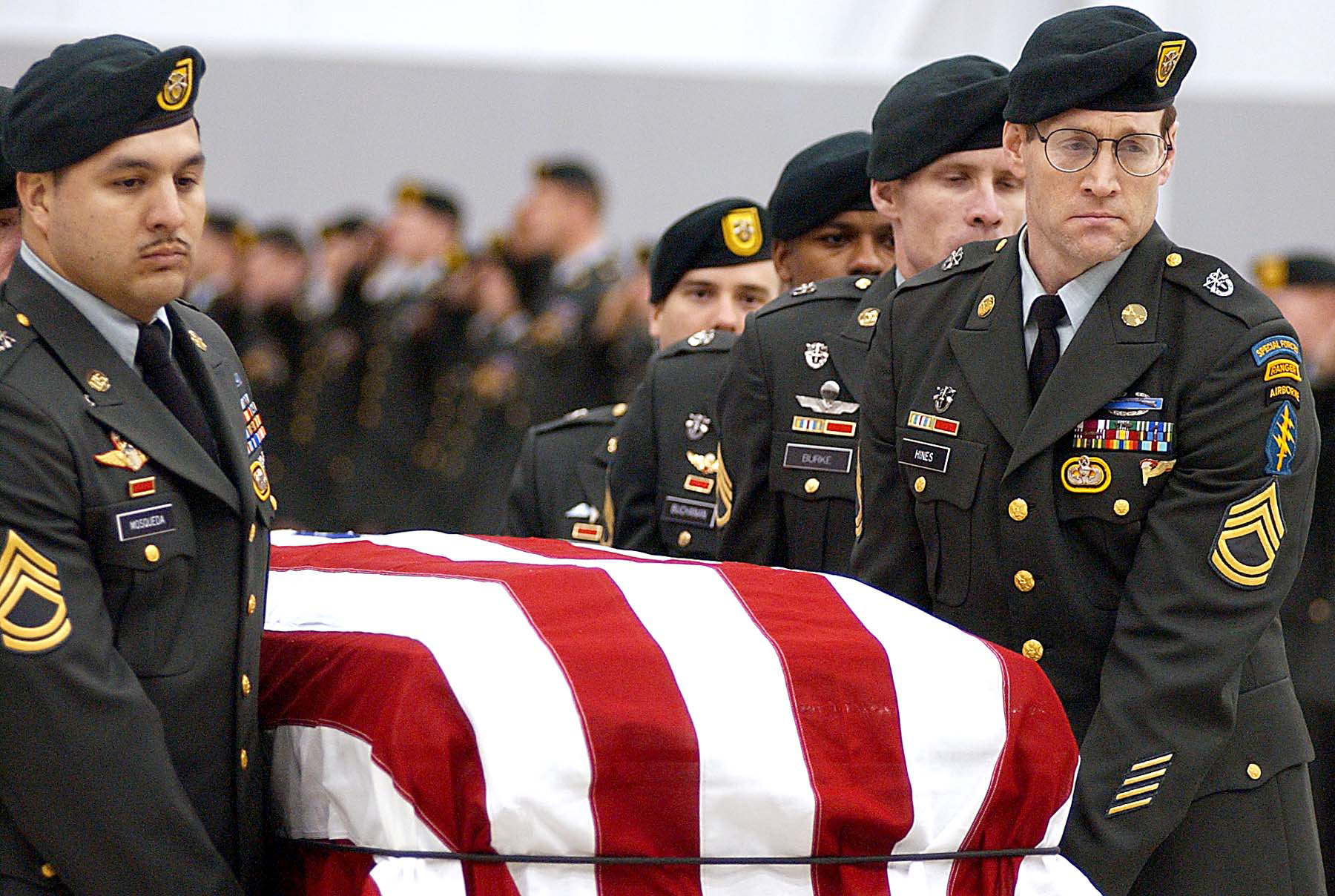
A casket team from the 1st Special Forces Group carry the flag-draped casket of Sergeant 1st Class Nathan R. Chapman on January 8, 2002, at Seattle-Tacoma International Airport.

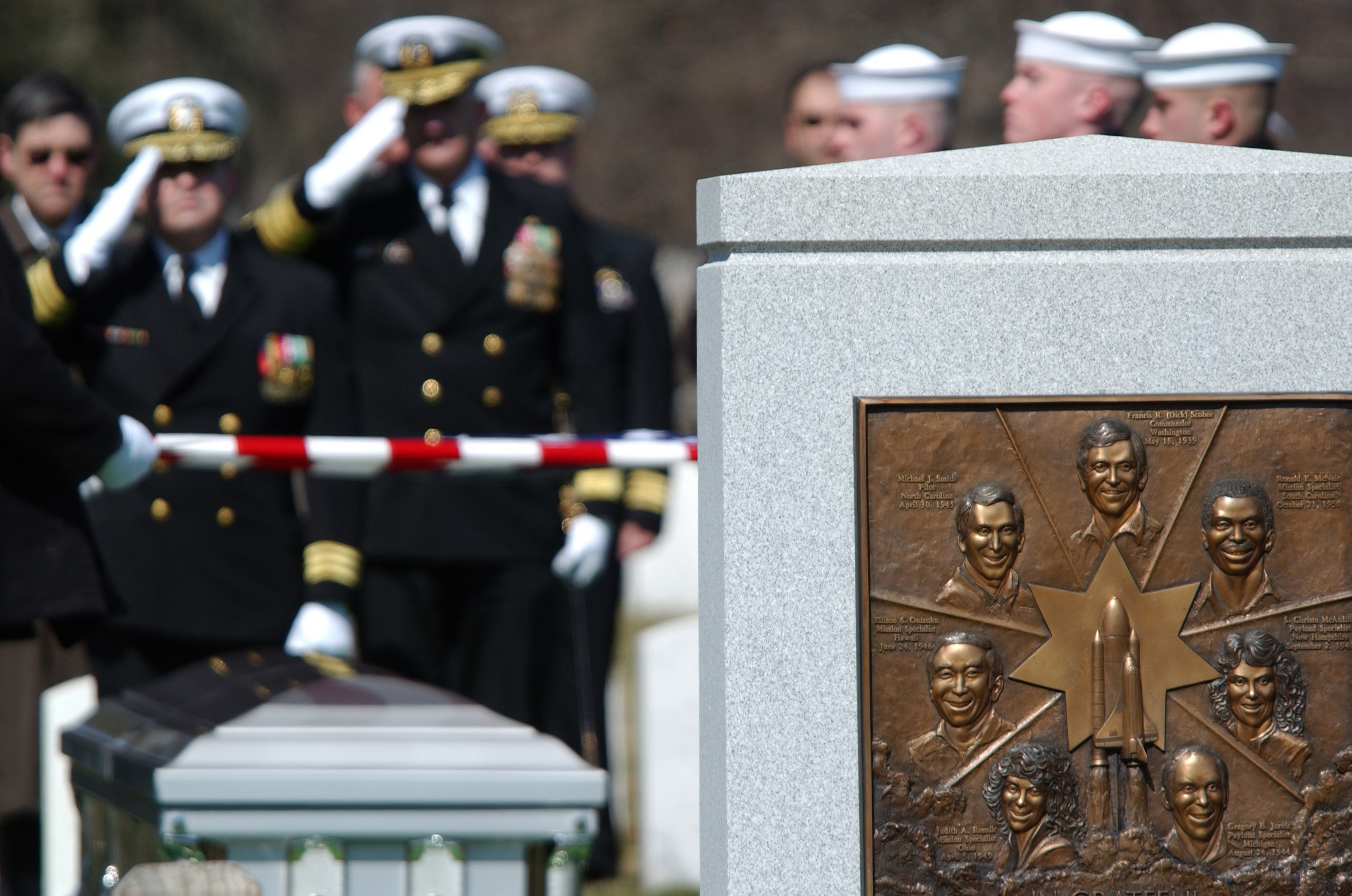
A casket team from the United States Navy fold the flag covering the remains of NASA Astronaut and U.S. Navy Captain Laurel Blair Salton Clark, a crew member of the Space Shuttle Columbia who perished with the rest of her crewmates during the Columbia disaster in 2003.

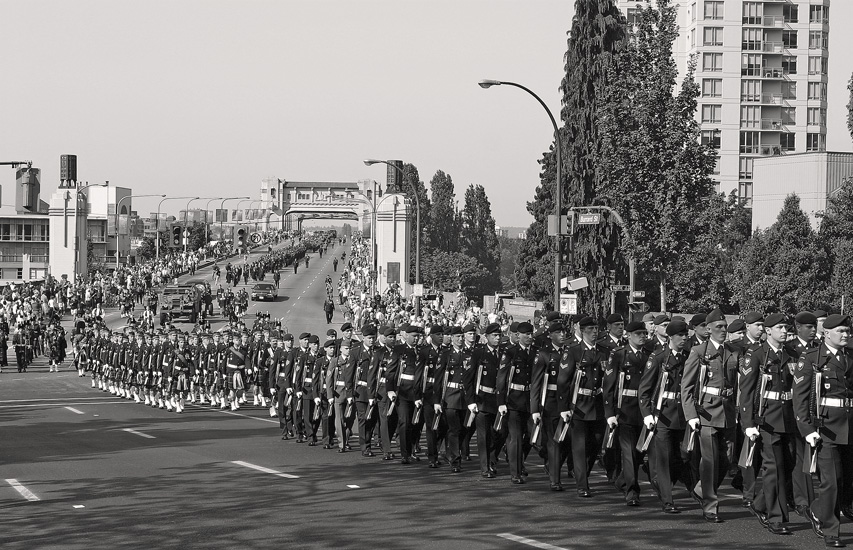
Military funeral procession for World War II soldier and Victoria Cross recipient Ernest ("Smokey") Smith in Vancouver, Canada on August 13, 2005.

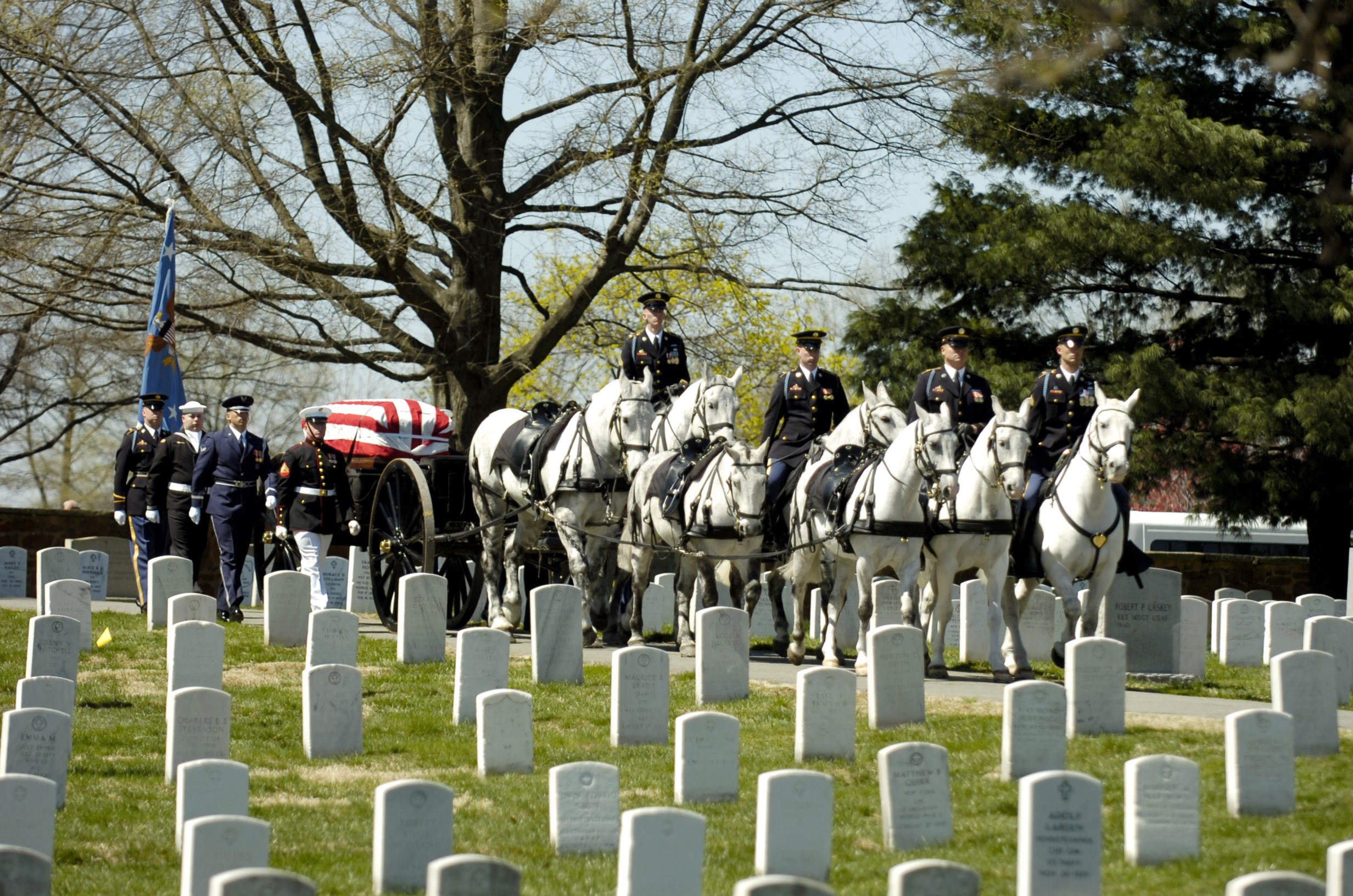
The casket of Caspar Weinberger, 15th United States Secretary of Defense, in a ceremonial funeral procession en route to its final resting place in Arlington National Cemetery on April 4, 2006.

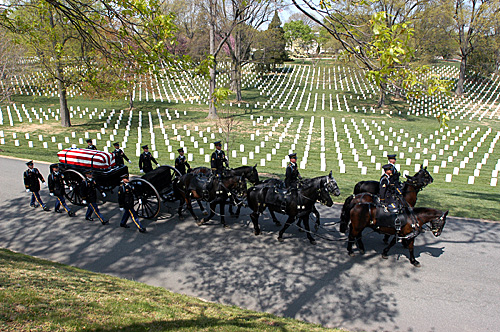
A casket team from the 3rd United States Infantry Regiment "The Old Guard" transports the remains of Retired Chief Warrant Officer Michael J. Novosel during a ceremonial funeral procession at Arlington National Cemetery where he was laid to rest on April 13, 2006.

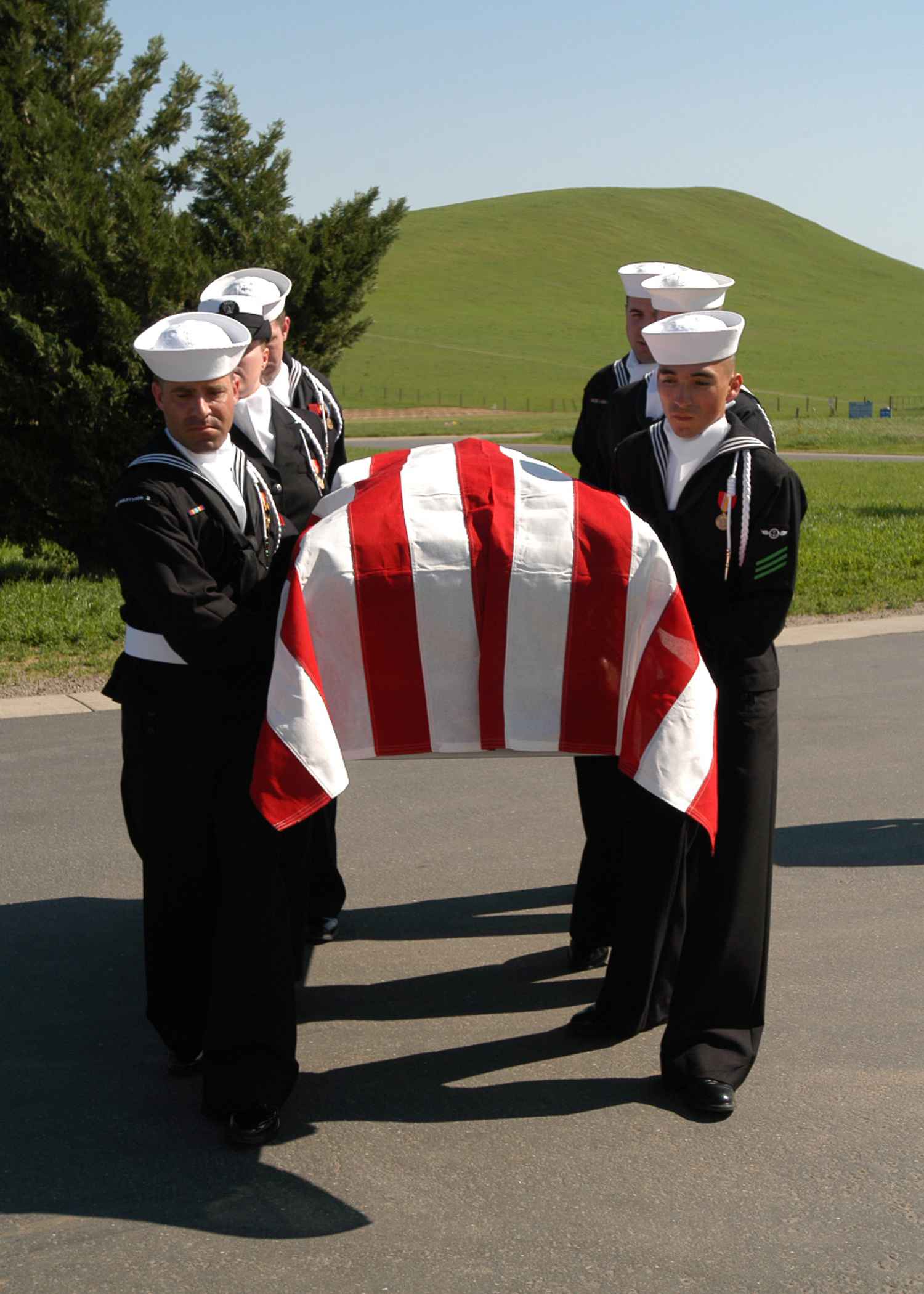
The Ceremonial Unit assigned to Naval Air Station Lemoore seen rendering honors at a military funeral at San Joaquin Valley National Cemetery in Gustine, California.

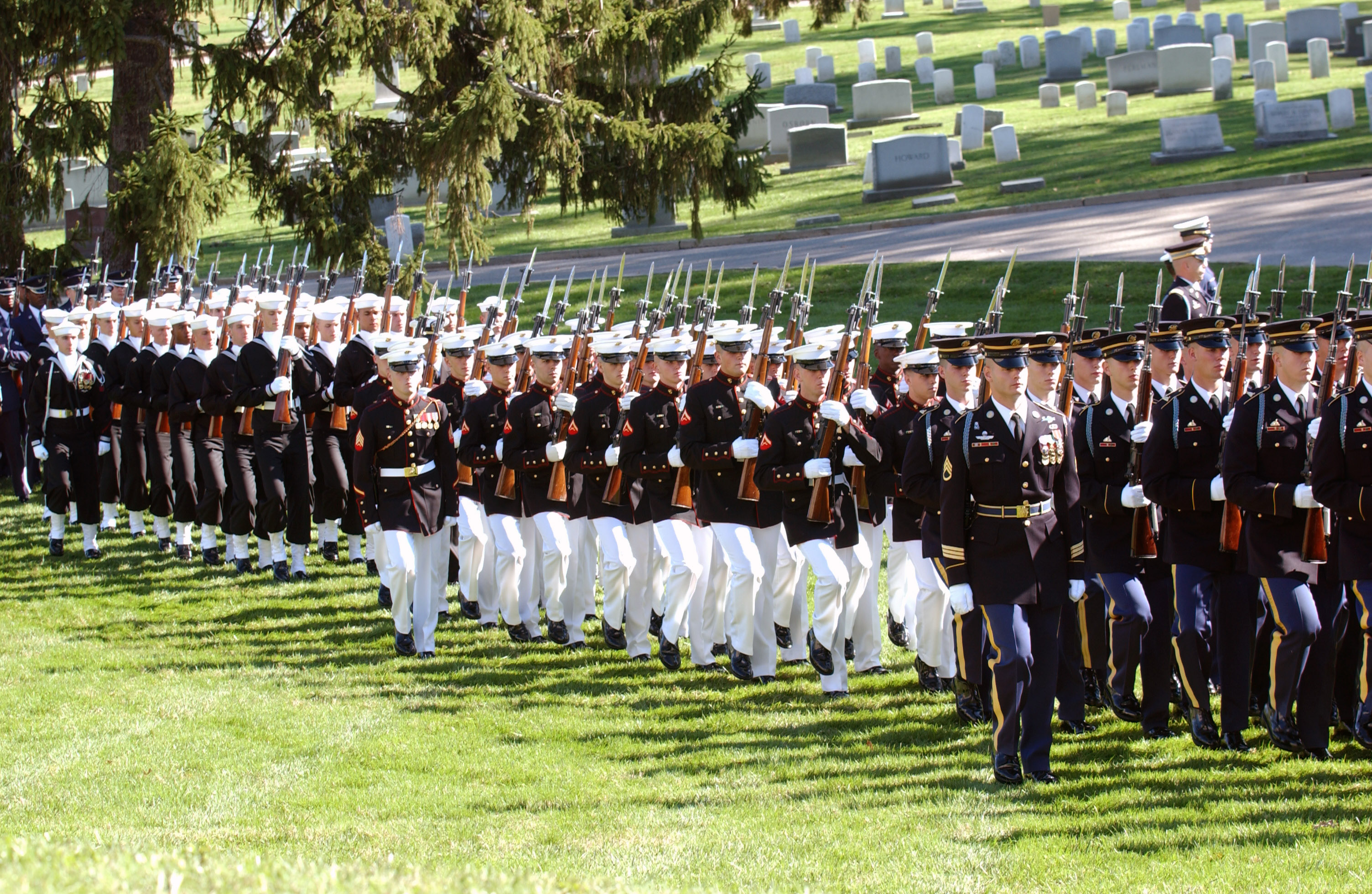
Escort platoons march in the United States Naval Academy Cemetery as part of the ceremonial funeral procession for former chairman of the Joint Chiefs of Staff, Admiral William J. Crowe in 2007.

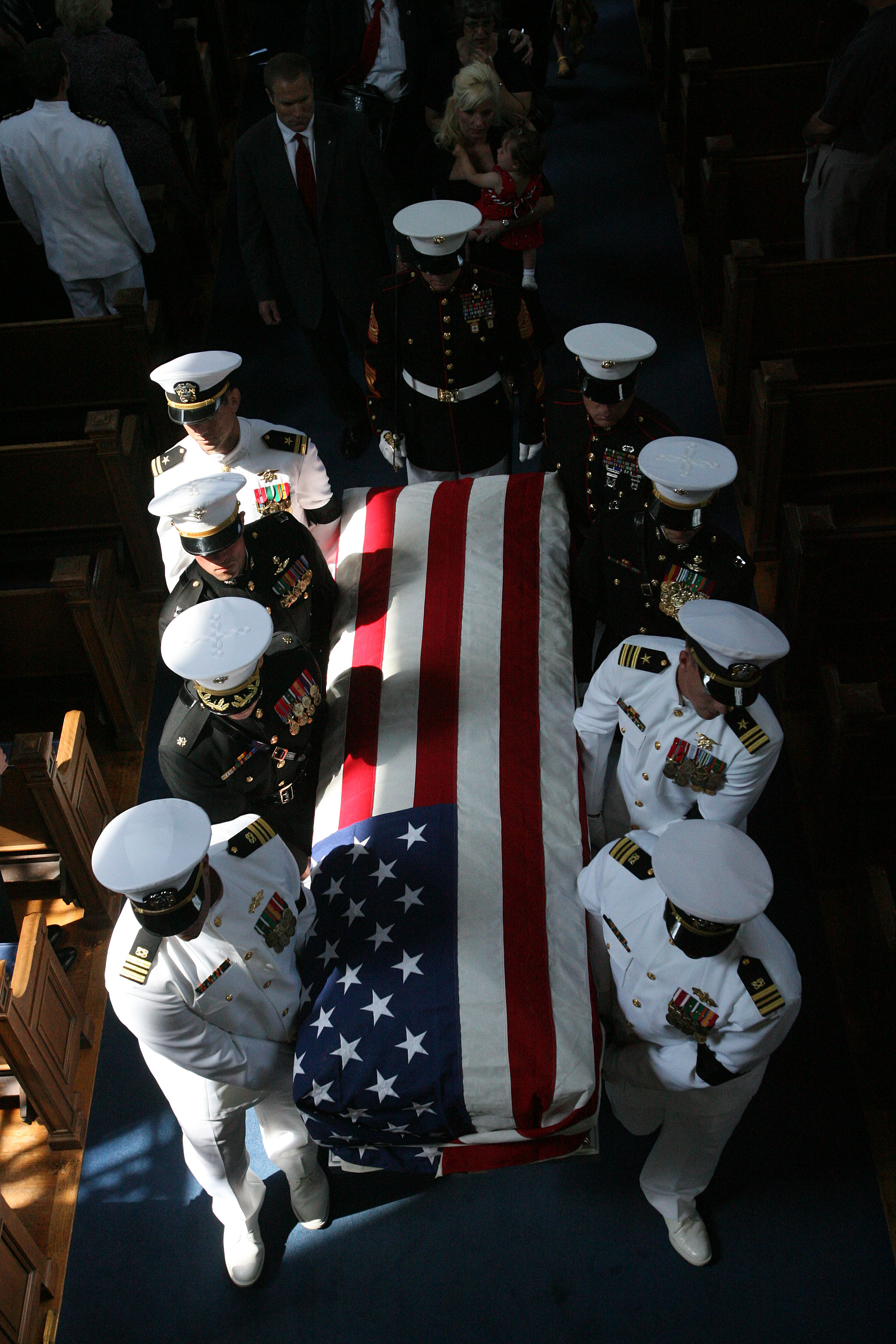
A casket team carries Major Douglas A. Zembiec, former commander of E Company, 2nd Battalion, 1st Marine Regiment from the Naval Academy Chapel in Annapolis, Maryland following a funeral service held in his honor.

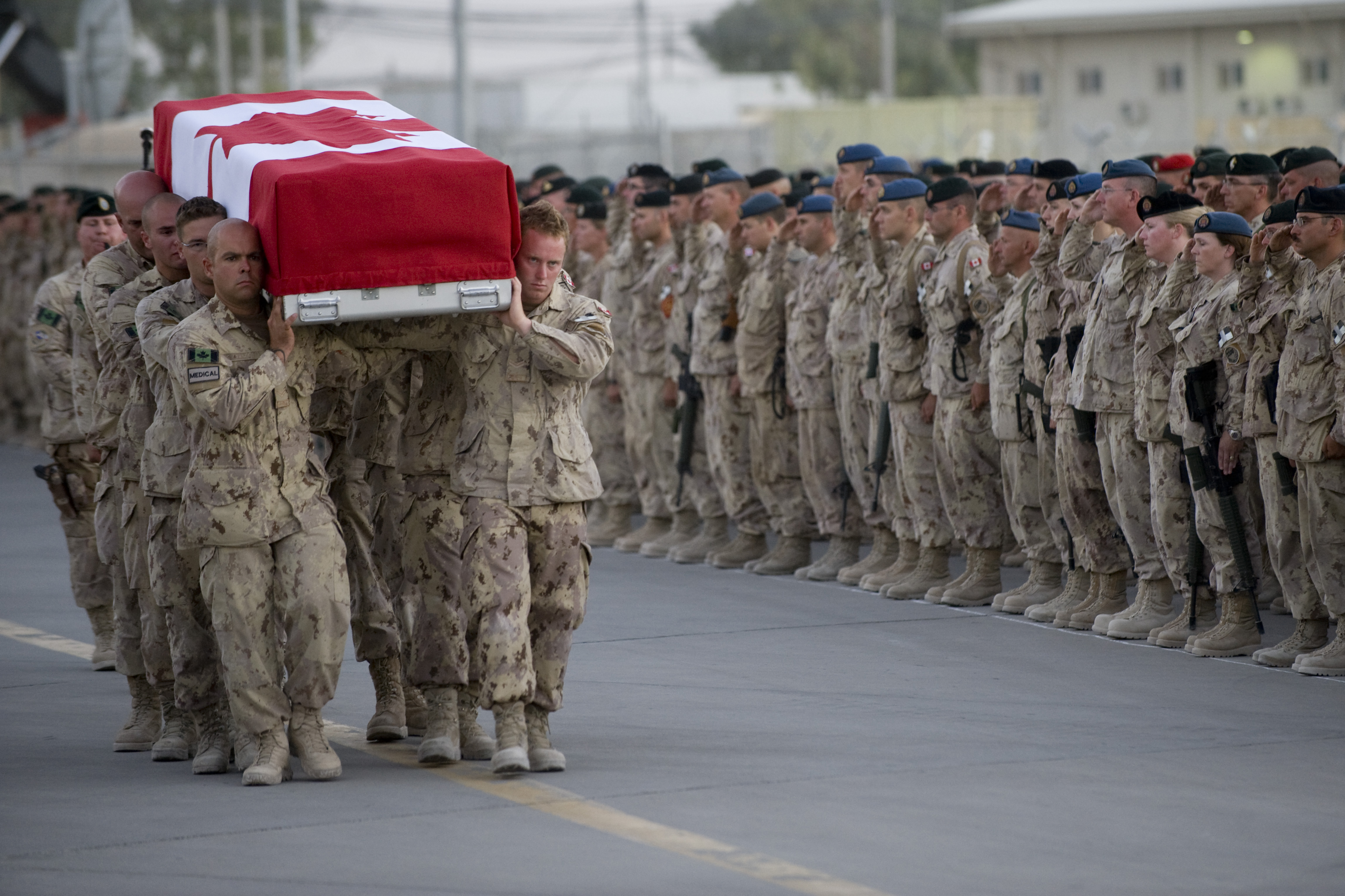
A Canadian honor guard carries the remains of Pte. Sebastien Courcy during a sundown ramp ceremony at Kandahar Air Field, Afghanistan on July 17, 2009.

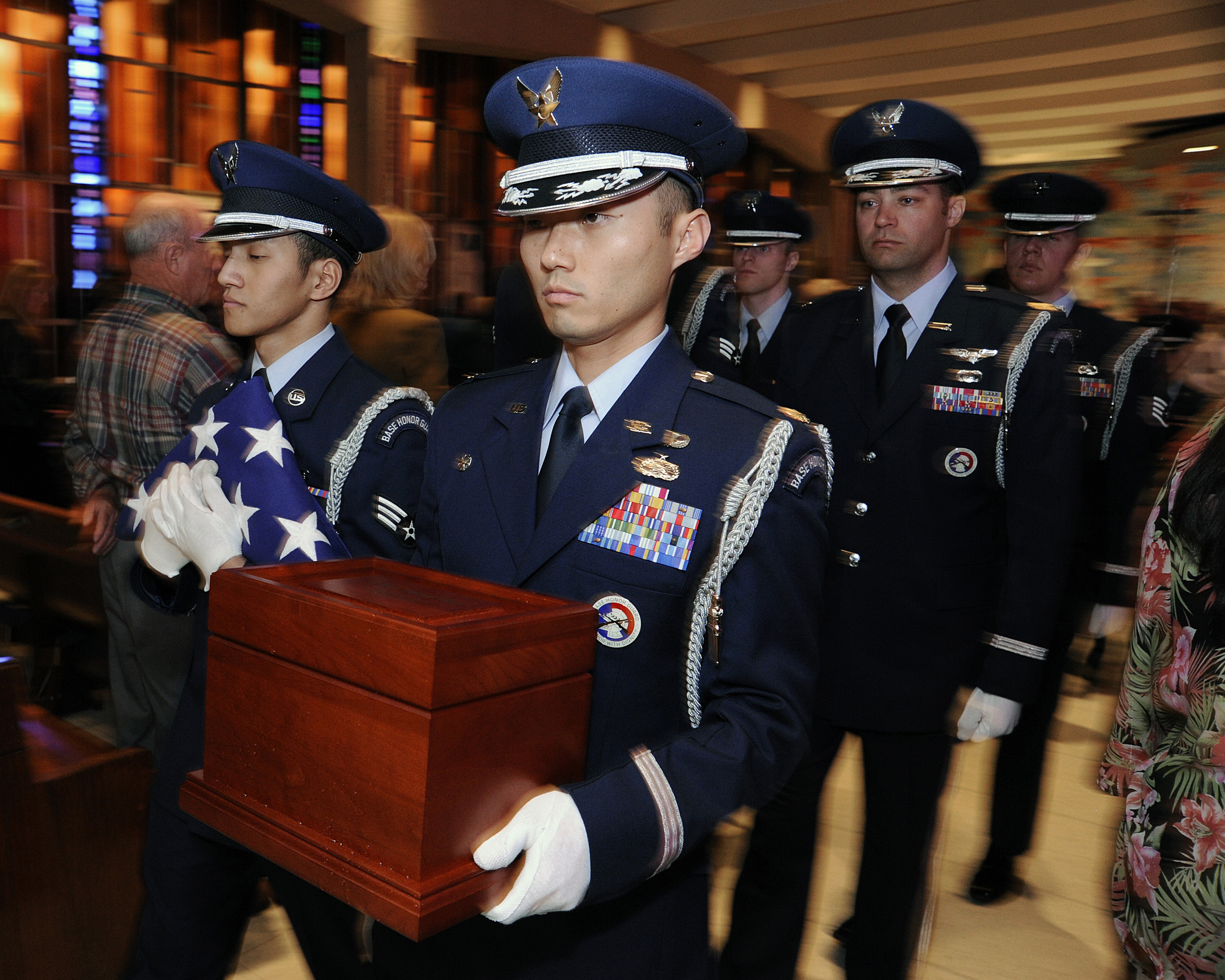
Major Robert Bonner carries the remains of Lt. Gen. A.P. Clark, who was taken as a prisoner of war during World War II.

== See also ==
- Military awards and decorations
- Military rites
- Burial at sea
- State funeral

== Images and sounds ==
- Sample of "Taps" (.wav)
