= Taps (bugle call) =

Bugle call, played during military funerals or patriotic ceremonies

- by Daniel Butterfield
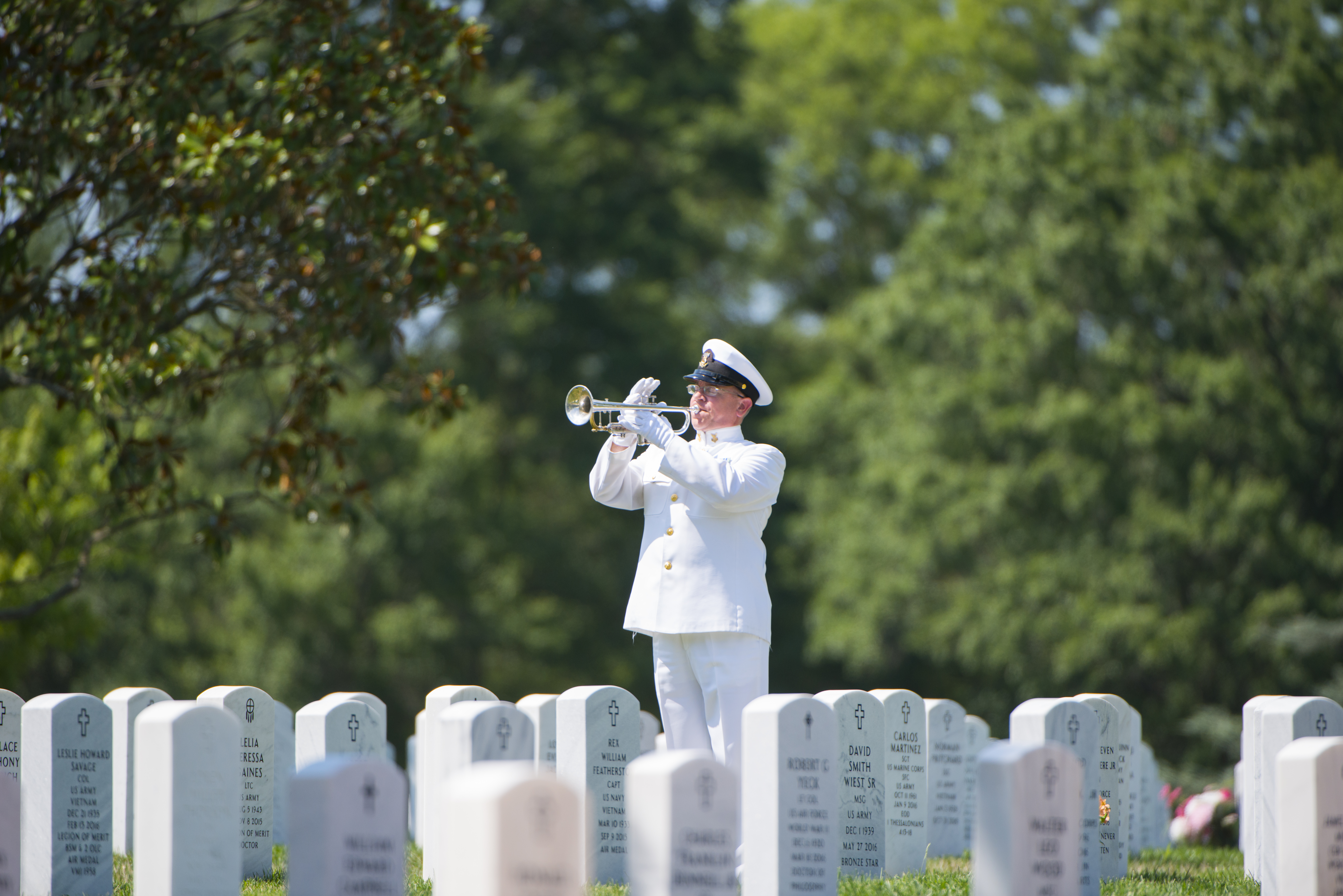
- MU1 Bill Dunn, a bugler from the U.S. Navy Band, plays "Taps" during a graveside service in Arlington National Cemetery.
- Key: B♭ major
- Form: Bugle call

Taps (in the key of B♭ major)
Taps as played on the bugle by a member of the United States Army Band

Taps is a bugle call sounded to signal "lights out" at the end of a military day, and during patriotic memorial ceremonies and military funerals conducted by the United States Armed Forces. The official military version is played by a single bugle or trumpet, although other versions of the tune may be played in other contexts (e.g., the U.S. Marine Corps Ceremonial Music site has recordings of two bugle versions and one band version). It is also performed often at Girl Guide, Girl Scout, and Boy Scout meetings and camps. The tune is also sometimes known as "Butterfield's Lullaby", or by the first line of the lyric, "Day Is Done". The duration may vary to some extent.

== Etymology ==
"Taps" is derived from the same source as "Tattoo". "Taps" is sometimes said to originate from the Dutch taptoe, meaning "close the [beer] taps [and send the troops back to camp]". An alternative explanation, however, is that it carried over from a term already in use before the American Civil War. Three single, slow drum beats were struck after the sounding of the Tattoo or "Extinguish Lights". This signal was known as the "Drum Taps", "The Taps", or simply as "Taps" in soldiers' slang.

== History ==
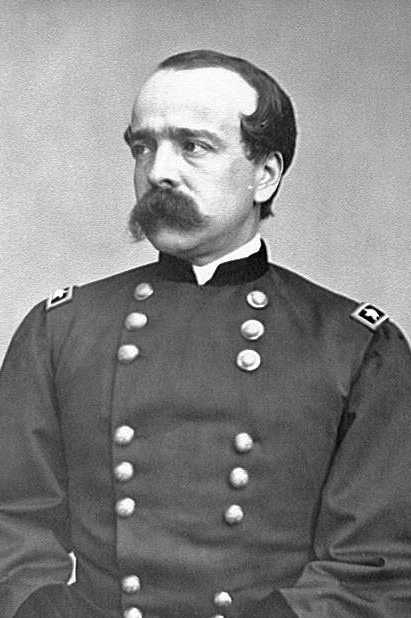
Brigadier General Daniel Butterfield

The tune is a variation of an earlier bugle call known as the "Scott Tattoo", which was used in the U.S. from 1835 until 1860. It was arranged in its present form by the Union Army Brigadier General Daniel Butterfield, a Medal of Honor recipient. Butterfield commanded the 3rd Brigade, 1st Division, V Army Corps, Army of the Potomac while at Harrison's Landing, Virginia in July 1862, and wrote it to replace the customary firing of three rifle volleys at the end of burials during battle. Butterfield's version in July 1862 replaced the previous French Pour Eteindre les Feux bugle call used to signal "lights out". Butterfield's bugler, Oliver Wilcox Norton, of East Springfield, Pennsylvania, was the first to sound the new call. Within months Taps was used by both Union and Confederate forces. It was officially recognized by the United States Army in 1874.

Captain John C. Tidball, West Point Class of 1848, started the custom of playing Taps at military funerals. In early July 1862 at Harrison's Landing, a corporal of Tidball's Battery A, 2nd U.S. Artillery, died. He was, Tidball recalled later, "a most excellent man". Tidball wished to bury him with full military honors, but, for military reasons, he was refused permission to fire seven rifles three times over the grave. Tidball later wrote, "The thought suggested itself to me to sound Taps instead, which I did. The idea was taken up by others, until in a short time it was adopted by the entire army and is now looked upon as the most appropriate and touching part of a military funeral." As Tidball proudly proclaimed, "Battery A has the honor of having introduced this custom into the service, and it is worthy of historical note."

It became a standard component to U.S. military funerals in 1891.

== Use ==
Taps concludes military funerals that are conducted with honors at Arlington National Cemetery and elsewhere. The tune is also sounded at memorial services in Arlington's Memorial Amphitheater and at grave sites throughout the cemetery. Taps concludes about 15 military funerals conducted with honors each weekday at Arlington National Cemetery (run by the U.S. Army), at nearly 200 other National Cemeteries (run by the Department of Veterans Affairs) around the country, and at Cemeteries overseas run by the American Battle Monuments Commission. Taps is sounded every evening at 23:00 (11:00pm) at the Tomb of the Unknowns, as well as during the 2,500 military wreath ceremonies conducted there every year. The ceremonies are viewed by many groups, including veterans, schools, and foreign officials.

The final bugle call of the day on military installations, Taps is played at military bases as a signal to service members that it is quiet time or "lights out". The time varies between branches and individual bases: either 21:00, 22:00, or 23:00 (9, 10, or 11pm). When Taps is played, it is customary for service members to salute (if in uniform), or to stand at the position of attention if not; it is considered a moment to reflect and honor those who gave their lives while serving.

Taps is sounded during each of the military wreath ceremonies conducted at the Tomb of the Unknown Soldier every year, including the ones held on Memorial Day. The ceremonies are viewed by many people, including veterans, school groups, and foreign officials. Taps also is sounded nightly in military installations at non-deployed locations to indicate that it is "lights out", and often by Boy Scouts, Girl Scouts and Girl Guides to mark the end of an evening event such as a campfire.

== Melody and lyrics ==
The melody of Taps is composed entirely from the written notes of the C major triad (i.e., C, E, and G, with the G used in the lower and higher octaves). This is because the bugle, for which it is written, can play only the notes in the harmonic series of the instrument's fundamental tone; a B-flat bugle thus plays the notes B-flat, D, and F. Taps uses the third, fourth, fifth, and sixth partials.

Taps in C

Taps is a bugle call, and is not a considered a song. As such, there are no associated lyrics. Many bugle calls had words associated with them as a mnemonic device but these are not lyrics. Horace Lorenzo Trim is often credited for a set of words intended to accompany the music:

Day is done, gone the sun,
From the lake, from the hills, from the sky;
All is well, safely rest, God is nigh.

Fading light, dims the sight,
And a star gems the sky, gleaming bright.
From afar, drawing nigh, falls the night.

Thanks and praise, for our days,
'Neath the sun, 'neath the stars, neath the sky;
As we go, this we know, God is nigh.

Sun has set, shadows come,
Time has fled, Scouts must go to their beds
Always true to the promise that they made.

While the light fades from sight,
And the stars gleaming rays softly send,
To thy hands we our souls, Lord, commend.

Several later lyrical adaptations have been created. Girl Guides in the UK usually sing "from the sea" not "from the lake".

== Legends ==
There are several legends concerning the origin of Taps. The most widely circulated one states that a Union Army infantry officer, whose name often is given as Captain Robert Ellicombe, first ordered Taps performed at the funeral of his son, a Confederate soldier killed during the Peninsula Campaign. This apocryphal story claims that Ellicombe found the tune in the pocket of his son's clothing and performed it to honor his memory, but there is no record of any man named Robert Ellicombe holding a commission as captain in the Army of the Potomac during the Peninsula Campaign.

That Daniel Butterfield composed Taps has been sworn to by numerous reputable witnesses including his bugler Norton, who first performed the tune. While scholars continue to debate whether or not the tune was original or based on an earlier melody, few researchers doubt that Butterfield is responsible for the current tune.

Another, perhaps more historically verifiable, account of Taps first being used in the context of a military funeral involves John C. Tidball, a Union artillery captain who during a break in fighting ordered the tune sounded for a deceased soldier in lieu of the more traditional—and much less discreet—three volley tribute. Army Col. James A. Moss, in an Officer's Manual initially published in 1911, reports the following:

During the Peninsula Campaign in 1862, a soldier of Tidball's Battery A of the 2nd Artillery was buried at a time when the battery occupied an advanced position concealed in the woods. It was not safe to fire the customary three volleys over the grave, on account of the proximity of the enemy, and it occurred to Capt. Tidball that the sounding of Taps would be the most appropriate ceremony that could be substituted.

While not necessarily addressing the origin of Taps, this does represent the first recorded instance of Taps being sounded as part of a military funeral. Until then, while the tune had meant that the soldiers' day of work was finished, it had little to none of the connotation or overtone of death, with which it so often is associated today.

Another lesser-known legend is that of Lieutenant William Waid paying saloon-keepers to shut off the taps to the kegs when the song was played in a neighboring army camp. Lt. Waid's name has not been found in Union or Confederate records.

== Non-military variants ==
Although primarily used within the military, several local or special variations of the tune are performed, primarily by organizations such as the Girl Scouts of the USA or American military schools. It is also played outside the US in remembrance of the dead.

=== Echo Taps and Silver Taps ===
Echo Taps or Silver Taps is a tradition in which Taps is played at U.S. military schools—such as Norwich University, Texas A&M University, New Mexico Military Institute, The Citadel, and Virginia Tech—when a member or former member of a school's corps of cadets is killed in action. Echo Taps ceremonies involve some arrangement of Taps for two buglers, playing antiphonally to represent both the cadet's branch of service and their college. Silver Taps ceremonies may use such an arrangement, or some other version for two or more instruments.

At Norwich University, the ceremony is held on the Upper Parade Ground, where the Corps of Cadets forms up silently at 2145 (9:45 p.m.) for tattoo, and then stands in silence until 2200 (10:00 p.m.) when "Echo Taps" is sounded, at which time unit commanders tacitly will give the commands of attention and present arms. The regimental bugler stands either near the flagpole in front of Jackman Hall or on Jackman's balcony and plays the main tune of Taps. The echoing bugler will stand on the steps of Dewey Hall facing the Parade Ground and echo each series of notes. Following the sounding of Taps, the Corps of Cadets dismisses in silence.

At Texas A&M, Echo Taps is held on the Corps of Cadets Quad at 10:30 p.m. For the ceremony, the Corps falls out and both students and cadets gather to form around the Quad. A bugler is posted at the megaphone on the south end and another is at the arches on the north end. Cadets salute and the bugler on the south end plays the first three notes of Silver Taps, the bugler on the north end echoes, the bugler on the south end plays the next three notes and is echoed for the rest of the song. Cadets and students then return to their dorms.

Silver Taps is a long-standing tradition at Texas A&M. It is performed as a tribute to a student who was enrolled in undergraduate or graduate studies when they died. This final tribute is held the first Tuesday of the month when a student has died the previous month. The first Silver Taps was held in 1898 and honored Lawrence Sullivan Ross, the former governor of Texas and president of A&M College. Silver Taps is currently held in the Academic Plaza. On the day of Silver Taps, a small card with the deceased student's name, class, major, and date of birth is placed as a notice at the base of the academic flagpole, in addition to the memorial located behind the flagpole. The A&M student newspaper, The Battalion, dedicates their Tuesday issue on a Silver Taps day to sharing stories of who the deceased students were. After the buglers play, the students silently return to their homes. Students return to their dorms, and lights remain extinguished until Reveille the next morning.

At New Mexico Military Institute, "Echo Taps" (otherwise known as "Silver Taps") is played by three trumpets on a night designated by the alumni association. This ceremony is held in the Hagerman Barracks to remember all the alumni who had died of normal causes or were killed in action that year. This ceremony also includes the lighting and extinguishing of a candle for every alumni of the year. One bugler is posted at the north, south, and west side of the barracks and the candles at the east. After this early "Taps", complete silence marks the rest of the night.

Army Regulation 220–90, Army Bands dated December 2007, Paragraph 2-5h(1) states the following: "'Echo Taps' or 'Silver Taps', the practice of performing 'Taps' with multiple buglers, is not authorized. 'Echo Taps' is not a part of Army tradition and improperly uses bugler assets."

Army Regulation 600–25, Salutes, Honors, and Visits of Courtesy, dated September 2004, Glossary, Section two states the following: "Taps The traditional 'lights out' musical composition played at military funerals and memorials. The official version of 'Taps' is played by a single bugle. In accordance with AR 220–90, 'Echo or Silver Taps', which is performed by two buglers, is not authorized."

Field Manual 12–50, U.S. Army Bands, dated October 1999, Appendix A, Official and Ceremonial Music, Appendix A, Section 1—Ceremonial Music, Paragraph A-35 "A-35. Signals that unauthorized lights are to be extinguished. This is the last call of the day. The call is also sounded at the completion of a military funeral ceremony. Taps is to be performed by a single bugler only. Performance of 'Silver Taps' or 'Echo Taps' is not consistent with Army traditions, and is an improper use of bugler assets."

=== Scouting ===
Many Scouting, Girl Scouts and Guiding groups around the world sing the first verse of Taps ("Day is done ...") at the close of a camp or campfire. Scouts in encampment may also have the unit's bugler sound taps once the rest of the unit has turned in, to signify that the day's activities have concluded and that silence is expected in the camp.

Within the Girl Guides of Canada, it is tradition to sing the third verse ("Thanks and praise ...") if the closing is done during daytime. This is often known as Daylight Taps.

The song (but in the key of G) was used for closedown on LM Radio in the 1960s before the national anthem.

== Equivalent songs ==
- "Der gute Kamerad" ("The good Comrade"), the German and Austrian equivalent for military funerals
- "Il Silenzio" ("Silence"), the Italian equivalent
- "Toque de oración" ("Prayer call"), the Spanish equivalent
- "La sonnerie aux morts", the French Armed Forces equivalent
- "Last Post", Commonwealth of Nations
- "Taptoe", The Dutch equivalent

== See also ==
- Keith Clark, U.S. Army bugler who played "Taps" at the funeral of President John F. Kennedy
- "Reveille", the bugle call sounded at sunrise
