= Last Post =

Bugle call

Last Post
The bugle call "Last Post", performed by Sergeant Codie Lynn Williams of Dallas on a Bugle in G

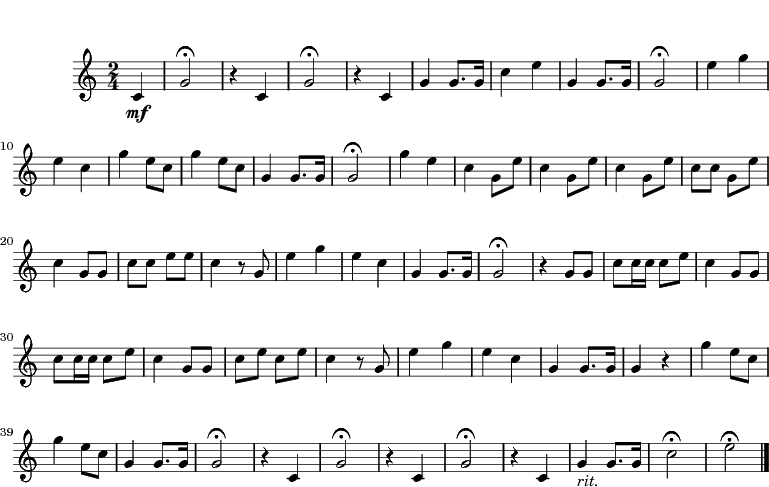
The "Last Post"

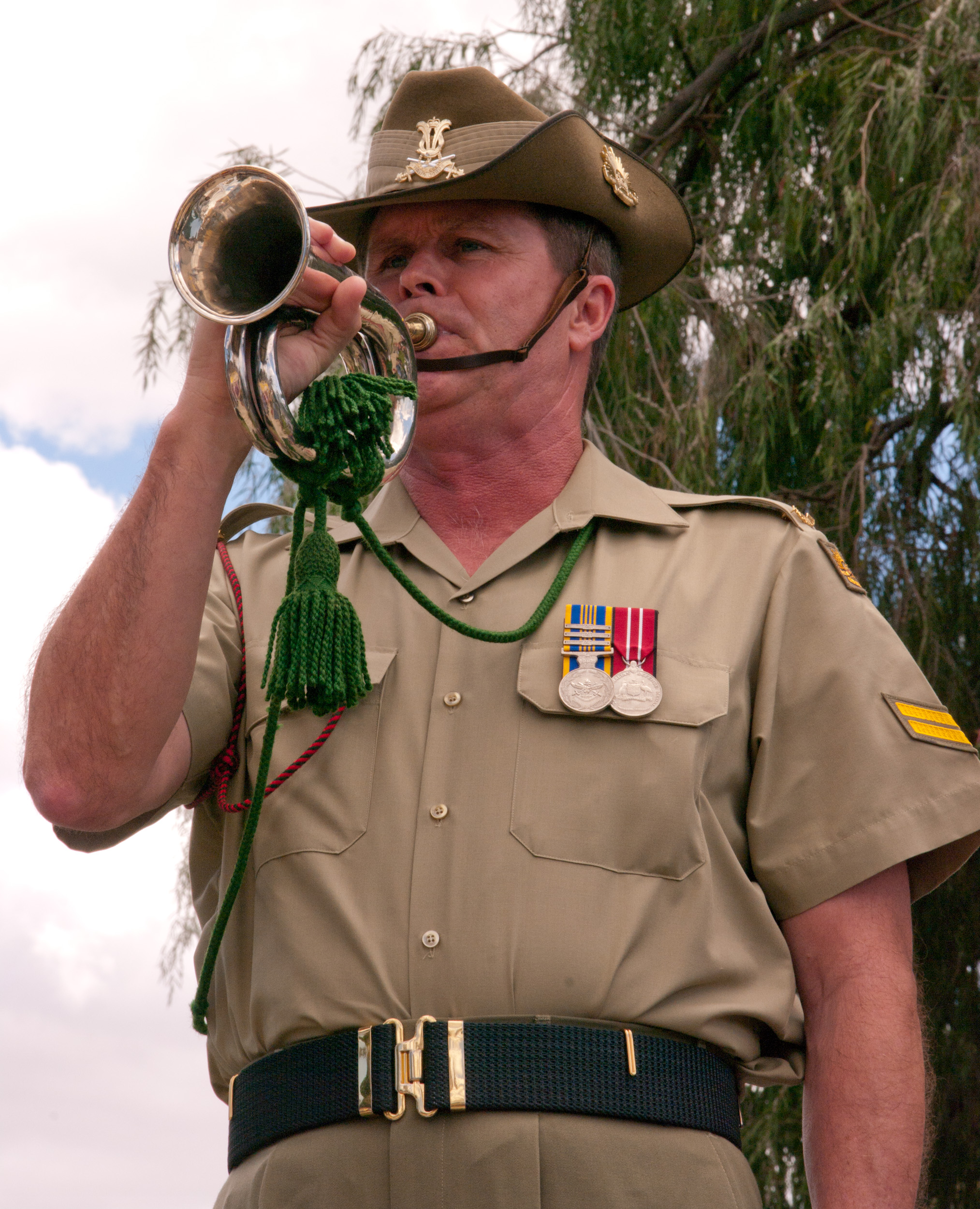
An Australian Army bugler sounds the Last Post at a Remembrance Day ceremony in 2012.

The "Last Post" is a British and Commonwealth bugle call used at military funerals, and at ceremonies commemorating those who have died in battle.

== Versions ==
The "Last Post" is either an A or a B♭ bugle call, primarily within British infantry and Australian infantry regiments, or a D or an E♭ cavalry trumpet call in British cavalry and Royal Regiment of Artillery (Royal Horse Artillery and Royal Artillery).

Its duration varies typically from a little over one minute to nearly three minutes. For ceremonial use, the "Last Post" is often followed by "The Rouse", or less frequently the longer "Reveille".

The two regimental traditions have separate music for the call. While the B♭ infantry bugle version is better known, the E♭ cavalry trumpet version is used by the state trumpeters of the Household Cavalry.

== Origin ==
The "First call" call signals the start of the duty officer's inspection of a British Army camp's sentry posts, sounding a call at each one. First published in the 1790s, the "Last Post" call originally signalled merely that the final sentry post had been inspected, and the camp was secure for the night.

Its use in Remembrance Day ceremonies in Commonwealth nations has two generally unexpressed purposes: the first is an implied summoning of the spirits of the Fallen to the cenotaph, the second is to symbolically end the day, so that the period of silence before the "Rouse" is blown becomes in effect a ritualised night vigil. The "Last Post" as sounded at the end of inspection typically lasted for about 45 seconds; when sounded ceremonially with notes held for longer, pauses extended, and the expression mournful, typical duration could be 75 seconds or more.

From the 17th century, the British infantry had used drums to make signals in camp or on the battlefield, while the cavalry used trumpets. The first infantry drumbeat of the day was Reveille, while the last was Tattoo. This originated with British troops stationed in the Netherlands, after the Dutch call at the end of the day, Doe den tap toe, meaning "Close the tap", a signal that beer taps had to be shut and that soldiers drinking outside the camp should return.

The difficulty of hearing drumbeat signals over the noise of gunfire led to the gradual introduction of the bugle, an instrument used by the Hanoverian Army, during the reign of King George III. The bugle was found especially useful for the mobile tactics of the light infantry and the newly formed King's Royal Rifle Corps in the American War of Independence. A number of different systems were introduced across various parts of the army, and in 1798, James Hyde, a trumpeter in the Royal Opera House and a trumpet-major in the local Volunteer Corps, was asked to "revise the trumpet and bugle soundings, and to reduce them to uniformity, which is hereafter to be strictly observed in all regiments and corps of cavalry in His Majesty's service".

The result was published in the same year as The Sounds for Duty and Exercise. Hyde was dissatisfied with this edition and in 1799, produced another version with an additional chapter entitled "The Bugle Horn Duty for the Light Infantry as used by the Foot Guards"; this included the first known score for the Last Post, under the title of "Setting the Watch". It is likely that Hyde used an amalgamation of existing calls; suggestions that the melody was inspired by Joseph Haydn lack any direct evidence.

== Memorial usage ==
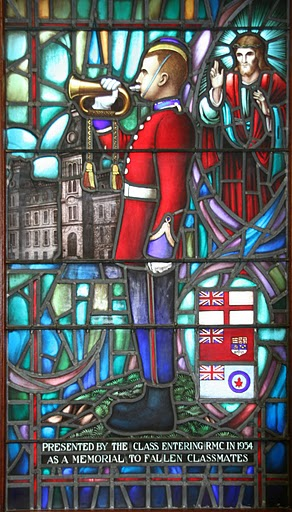
Memorial stained glass window, Class of 1934, Royal Military College of Canada showing officer cadet sounding the bugle call for the "Last Post" or "The Rouse".

During the 19th century, the "Last Post" was also carried to the various countries of the British Empire. In all these countries, it has been incorporated into military funerals, where it is sounded as a final farewell, symbolising the fact that the duty of the dead soldier is over and that he can rest in peace.

"Last Post" is used in public ceremonials commemorating the war dead, particularly on Remembrance Day in the Commonwealth of Nations. In Australia and New Zealand it is also sounded on Anzac Day, usually before the two-minute silence, which concludes with "The Rouse".

When the post is sounded during services such as Anzac Day, it is required of all current serving military members to salute for the duration of the call. During services organised by the Royal British Legion, it is expected that no salute is given during the "Last Post" and Silence, as all personnel will have removed head dress as in church service prayer, have heads bowed, weapons inverted, and flags and standards lowered.

In Ireland, the "Last Post" as with the Commonwealth is sounded during memorial services, funerals and commemorations. The difference where the Irish are concerned is that the accompaniment of drums is incorporated into the performance.

In India, Last Post is played at the Amar Jawan Jyoti on Republic Day and Kargil Vijay Diwas (Kargil Victory Day).

== Menin Gate ==
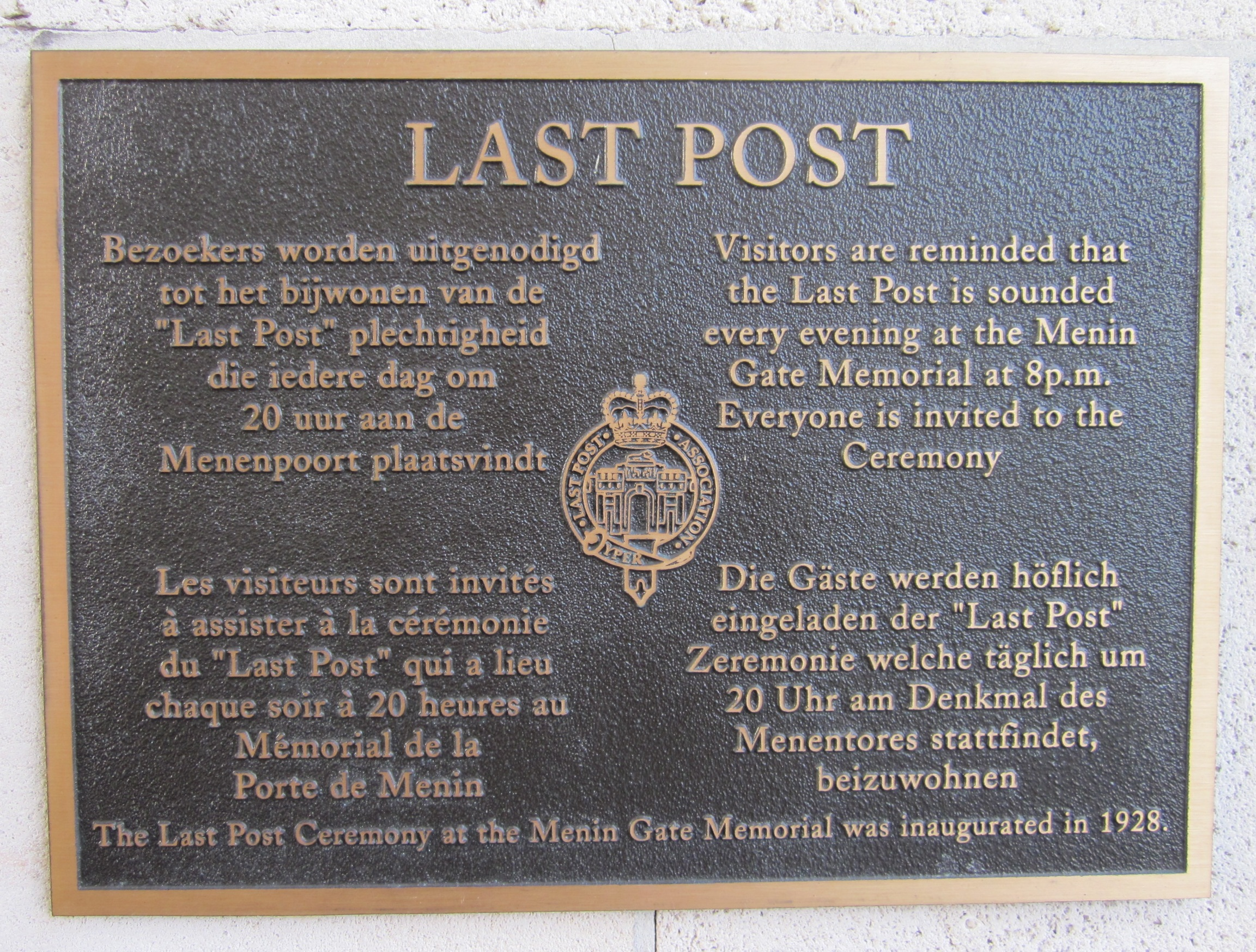
Last Post plaque, Menin Gate, Ypres, Belgium

Special ceremony in Ypres for the centenary of the armistice. A version of the Last Post at the Menin Gate is played exceptionally at 11am

Since 1928, the "Last Post" has been sounded every evening at 8 p.m. by buglers of the local Last Post Association at the war memorial at Ypres in Belgium known as the Menin Gate, commemorating the dead at the Battle of Ypres during the First World War. The only exception to this was during the four years of the German occupation of Ypres from 20 May 1940 to 6 September 1944, when the ceremony moved to Brookwood Military Cemetery in England.

On the evening that Polish forces liberated Ypres, the ceremony was resumed at the Menin Gate, in spite of the heavy fighting still going on in other parts of the town. These buglers or trumpeters, sometimes seen in fire brigade uniform, are members of the fire brigade representing the Last Post Association, who organizes the events. The Last Post Association uses both silver B♭ bugles and E♭ cavalry trumpets, with either British Army tradition being respected during services at the gate.

The Last Post ceremony has now been held more than 30,000 times. On 9 July 2015, a ceremony titled A tribute to the tribute took place to commemorate the 30,000th ceremony.

== Other uses ==
The "Last Post" was incorporated into the finale of Robert Steadman's In Memoriam, a choral work on the subject of remembrance. It is also incorporated into Karl Jenkins's orchestral mass The Armed Man, and in the movement entitled Small Town, in Peter Sculthorpe's 1963 chamber orchestra work The Fifth Continent. A slightly altered version forms part of the slow movement of the Pastoral Symphony of Ralph Vaughan Williams and the ending of Mike Sammes' choral setting of Laurence Binyon's poem For the Fallen.

Robert Graves's poem "The Last Post" describes a soldier's funeral during World War I. Ford Madox Ford used The Last Post as title for part of his tetralogy Parade's End.

In 2014 the Last Post was played upon arrival of the recovered bodies of the victims of MH17 Eindhoven Airport in the Netherlands. The Last Post was chosen over the Dutch signal Taptoe due to the international character of the disaster.

In 2015, Lee Kernaghan recorded a version for his album Spirit of the Anzacs.

The "Last Post" was performed in 2015 at the state funeral of Lee Kuan Yew, the founding Prime Minister of Singapore.

The Last Post is the title of a theatre play by David Owen Smith and Peter Came performed during Armistice Week at Lincoln Drill Hall, Lincoln in November 2014. The play concerns the Beechey family of Lincoln, UK. Amy Beechey had eight sons who all enlisted to fight during the First World War; only three of them survived. The bugle call is sounded during the final moments of the play. The play was directed by Janie Smith and performed by people of Lincoln.

British Forces Broadcasting Service radio stations would play the "Last Post" before the National Anthem at closedown.

== See also ==
- "Danmarks sidste honnør", the Danish Defence equivalent
- "Ich hatt' einen Kameraden" ('I had a comrade'), the German and Austrian equivalent for military funerals
- "La muerte no es el final" ('Death is not the end'), the Spanish Armed Forces equivalent
- "Reveille", a bugle call sounded at sunrise
- "Sonnerie aux morts", the French Armed Forces equivalent
- "Taps", the United States Armed Forces equivalent
- "The Rouse"
- Antoon Verschoot
