= Daniel Butterfield =

American businessman, Union General, and politician (1831–1901)

Daniel Adams Butterfield
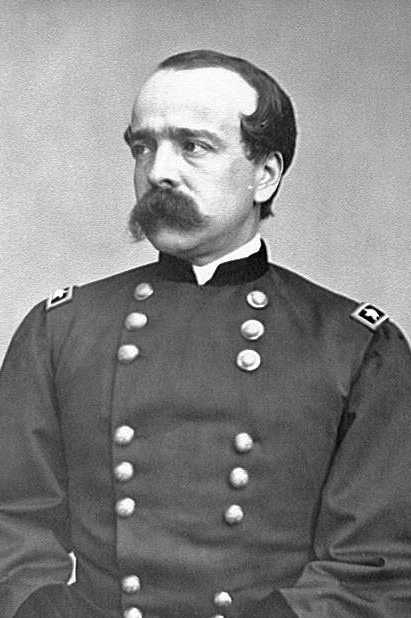
- Daniel Butterfield
- Born: October 31, 1831; Utica, New York, U.S.
- Died: July 17, 1901 (aged 69); Cold Spring, New York, U.S.
- Burial place: West Point Cemetery; United States Military Academy; West Point, New York, U.S.
- Military career
- Allegiance: United States (Union)
- Branch: U.S. Army (Union Army)
- Service years: 1861–1870
- Rank: Major General
- Units: 3rd Brigade, 1st Division, V Corps
- Commands: V Corps
- Conflicts: American Civil War; Peninsula Campaign; Seven Days Battles; Battle of Gaines' Mill; Second Battle of Bull Run; Battle of Antietam; Battle of Fredericksburg; Battle of Gettysburg; Atlanta campaign
- Awards: Medal of Honor
- Other work: Composer of "Taps"; Assistant U.S. Treasurer

Daniel Adams Butterfield (October 31, 1831 – July 17, 1901) was a New York businessman, a Union general in the U.S. Civil War, and Assistant Treasurer of the United States.

After working for American Express, co-founded by his father, Butterfield served in the Civil War, where he was soon promoted brigadier general, and wounded at Gaines' Mill. While recuperating, he wrote a bugle call for burials, called Taps. He commanded a division at Fredericksburg, and then became General Joseph Hooker's chief of staff for the Army of the Potomac, sharing both the credit for improved morale and responsibility for the licentious behavior that Hooker tolerated in camp. He also became embroiled in Hooker's political feuds with Generals Ambrose Burnside and George Gordon Meade. When Meade took over the Army from Hooker, he attempted to replace Butterfield, but his chosen candidates preferred to stay in their current assignments, so Butterfield stayed on as chief of staff, to Meade's dissatisfaction.

Wounded at Gettysburg, Meade sent Butterfield away to recuperate. He then served in William T. Sherman's Atlanta campaign, before retiring from front-line service because of illness. He later received the Medal of Honor.

In Ulysses S. Grant's presidential administration, he was Assistant Treasurer of the United States, abusing that position to manipulate the price of gold, and being forced to resign. He then resumed his business career.

Butterfield's extensive war archives are displayed at Cold Spring, New York.

== Early life ==
Butterfield was born on October 31, 1831, in Utica, New York. He attended Union Academy and then graduated in 1849, from Union College in Schenectady, New York, where he became a member of the Sigma Phi Society. That same year, his father, John Warren Butterfield, founded the express company of Butterfield, Wasson, and Co., which later became the American Express Company. After graduating, Daniel studied law but as he was too young to sit the New York bar exam, he toured the country instead. Upon his return to Utica, he joined the Utica Citizen's Corps as a private. He was employed in various businesses in New York and the South, including the American Express Company, which had been co-founded by his father, an owner of the Overland Mail Company, stage-coaches, steamships and telegraph lines.

== Civil War ==
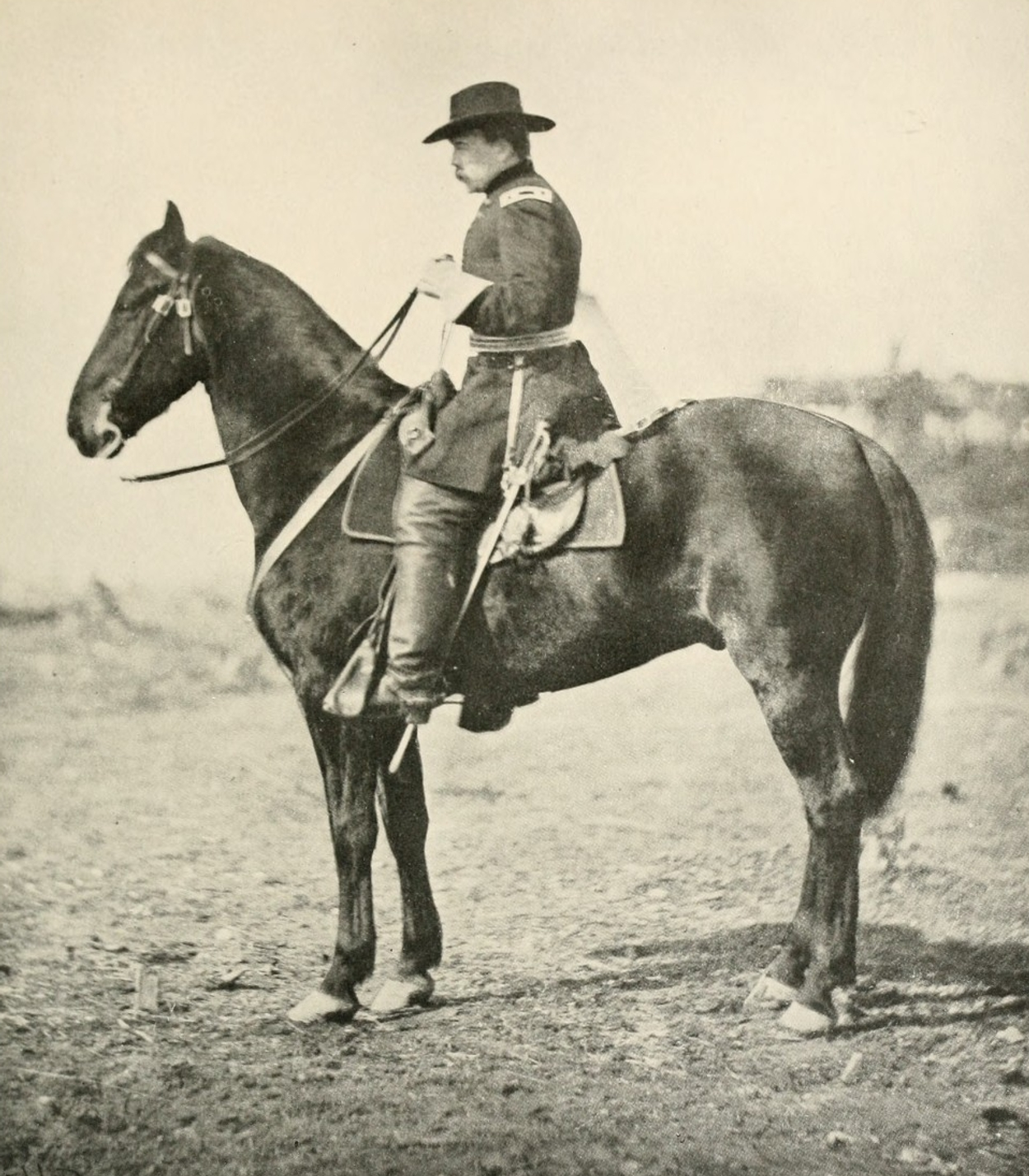
Union General Daniel Butterfield

Butterfield went to New York City as superintendent of the eastern division of his father's company. There, he joined the Seventy-First regiment of New York militia as a captain. Shortly after the fall of Fort Sumter, Butterfield joined the Clay Guards of Washington, D.C., as a first sergeant, but subsequently transferred to the 12th New York Volunteer Infantry as a colonel.

He was commissioned brigadier and major general of the Volunteers and commanded a division of the V Corps. He fought at the First Battle of Bull Run on 21 July 1861. He wrote the 1862 Army field manual, Camp and Outpost Duty for Infantry.

Butterfield joined Maj. Gen. George B. McClellan's Army of the Potomac for the Peninsula Campaign in the V Corps, commanded by Maj. Gen. Fitz John Porter. In the Seven Days Battles, at Gaines' Mill on June 27, 1862, he was wounded but demonstrated the bravery that was eventually recognized in 1892, with the Medal of Honor.

Butterfield continued in brigade command at the Second Battle of Bull Run and the Battle of Antietam, became division commander and then V Corps commander for the Battle of Fredericksburg. His corps was one of those assaulting through the city before facing an assault from Marye's Heights. After the debacles of Fredericksburg and the Mud March, Maj. Gen. Joseph Hooker replaced Ambrose Burnside as Army of the Potomac commander and Butterfield became Hooker's chief of staff in January 1863. Butterfield was promoted to major general of volunteers in March 1863, with a date of rank of November 29, 1862.

Hooker and Butterfield developed a close personal and political relationship. To the disgust of many army generals, their headquarters were frequented by women and liquor, being described as a combination of a "bar and brothel". Political infighting became rampant in the high command and Butterfield was widely disliked by most of his colleagues. However, in the spring of 1863, the two officers managed to turn around the poor morale of the army and greatly improved food, shelter and medical support. During this period Butterfield introduced another custom that remains in the Army today: the use of distinctive hat or shoulder patches to denote the unit to which a soldier belongs, in this case the corps. He was inspired by the division patches used earlier by Maj. Gen. Philip Kearny, but extended those to the full army; Butterfield designed most of the patches himself.

Hooker was replaced after the Battle of Chancellorsville by Maj. Gen. George G. Meade, just before the Battle of Gettysburg. Meade distrusted Butterfield, but retained him as chief of staff. Butterfield was wounded at Gettysburg on July 3, 1863, and left active duty to convalesce. Meade removed him as chief of staff on July 14, 1863. On July 1, 1863, Butterfield was appointed as colonel of the 5th United States Infantry.

After Gettysburg, Butterfield actively undermined Meade in cooperation with Maj. Gen. Daniel Sickles, another crony of Hooker's. Although the battle was a great Union victory, Sickles and Butterfield testified to the Joint Committee on the Conduct of the War that Meade vacillated and planned as early as July 1, to retreat from Gettysburg, thus damaging his reputation. Butterfield's chief evidence for this assertion was the Pipe Creek Circular that Meade had his staff prepare before it became apparent there would be a battle at Gettysburg.

Butterfield returned to duty that fall as chief of staff once again for Hooker, now commanding two corps in the Army of the Cumberland at Chattanooga, Tennessee. When these two depleted corps (the XI and XII Corps) were combined to form the XX Corps, Butterfield was given the 3rd Division, which he led through the first half of Sherman's Atlanta campaign. Illness prevented his continuing with Sherman, resulting in Butterfield's assuming light duties at Vicksburg, Mississippi, followed by recruiting and the command of harbor forces in New York.

=== Taps ===
While the Union Army recuperated at Harrison's Landing, Virginia, from its grueling withdrawal during the Seven Days Battles, Butterfield experimented with bugle calls and is credited with the composition of Taps. He wrote Taps to replace the customary firing of three rifle volleys at the end of burials during battle. Taps also replaced Tattoo, the French bugle call to signal lights out. Butterfield's bugler, Private Oliver W. Norton of the 83rd Pennsylvania Volunteers, was the first to sound the new call. Within months, Taps was played by buglers in both the Union and Confederate armies.

This account has been disputed by some who think Butterfield made an arrangement of another bugle call known as the Scott Tattoo rather than compose an original work. However, both Butterfield and Norton wrote letters saying that Butterfield composed the tune and sounded it out for Norton to transcribe on paper. Field commanders were known to play bugle calls when needed as that is how they gave orders in the field.

It is customary for those in uniform to render a hand salute, and those in civilian clothes to place the right hand over the heart and stand at attention while Taps is sounded.

=== Medal of Honor ===
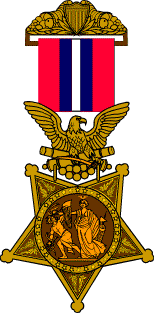
Medal of Honor(1896 version)

Rank and organization: Brigadier General, U.S. Volunteers. Place and date: At Gaines Mill, Va., June 27, 1862. Entered service at: Washington, D.C. Born: October 31, 1831, Utica, N.Y. Date of issue: September 26, 1892.

When his brigade lost more than six hundred men in the Battle of Gaines Mill, then-Brig. Gen. Butterfield took up the colors of the 83rd Pennsylvania Volunteers. Under heavy enemy fire, he encouraged the depleted ranks to regroup and continue the battle. Thirty years later, he was awarded the Medal of Honor on September 26, 1892 “for distinguished gallantry in action at Gaines Mills, Virginia on June 27, 1862”.

Citation: "Seized the colors of the 83d Pennsylvania Volunteers at a critical moment and, under a galling fire of the enemy, encouraged the depleted ranks to renewed exertion."

== Life after the Civil War ==
After the war, President Ulysses S. Grant appointed Butterfield Assistant Treasurer of the United States, based on a recommendation by Abel Corbin, Grant's brother-in-law. Butterfield agreed to tell Corbin and speculators Jay Gould and James Fisk when the government was planning to sell gold, a market that Fisk and Gould wanted to corner. Butterfield accepted $10,000 from Gould, which Butterfield said was "to cover expenses". Butterfield later testified to Congress that it was an unsecured real estate loan. If Butterfield tipped them off, then Fisk and Gould would sell their gold before the price dropped. The scheme was uncovered by Grant, who sold $4,000,000 of government gold without telling Butterfield, resulting in the panic of collapsing gold prices known as Black Friday, on September 24, 1869.

Butterfield resigned from the Treasury Department in October 1869. He then became active in business and banking, including an executive position with American Express. He was also active in Union College's alumni association and several veterans organizations, including the Grand Army of the Republic.

On September 21, 1886, Butterfield married Mrs. Julia Lorrilard Safford James of New York in a ceremony in London. The Butterfields built a summer residence, Craigside, across the Hudson River from West Point in Cold Spring, New York, where Daniel Butterfield died on July 17, 1901. He was buried with an ornate monument in the West Point Cemetery at the United States Military Academy, although he had not attended that institution. Taps was sounded at his funeral.

== Legacy ==
The Butterfield Paramedic Institute in Cold Spring, New York, which was once a hospital, is named for him.

=== Archives ===
The Julia L Butterfield Memorial Library in Cold Spring, New York is named for Butterfield's wife. The General Daniel Butterfield Civil War Collection is located there and include correspondence from Union generals, telegrams from Secretary of War Stanton and Gen. Sherman as he approached Atlanta, a battle map of Gettysburg, handwritten casualty lists, a manuscript by a field officer detailing the Battle of Gettysburg, and other material.

Bequeathed to the library by his widow in 1927, the collection's historical significance was not known until April 2011 when the West Point Museum Director and Chief Curator David Reel reviewed the collection. According to Reel, "The historical importance of the collection is unquestionable as a comprehensive archive of a major figure of the American Civil War and contains documents and letters, telegrams from 1861-64 that are irreplaceable and significant in content. . . No doubt, scholars of United States History and specifically the American Civil War will find a treasure trove of original, period material within the archive."

Gutzon Borglum created a statue of Major General Butterfield that is located in Sakura Park in Manhattan at West 122nd Street between Convent Avenue and Riverside Drive. With Riverside Church to its left, the statue faces President Grant's Tomb where President Ulysses and Julia Dent Grant are buried.

Butterfield died in Cold Spring, New York in 1901 and is buried on the grounds of the U.S. Military Academy at West Point, New York. Butterfield's second wife, Julia Lorillard Safford James Butterfield (Dec. 19, 1823 – Aug. 6, 1913) is buried in the James family mausoleum in Cold Spring Cemetery in Cold Spring, Putnam County, New York. His first wife, Elizabeth Julia “Lizzie” Brown Butterfield (May 5, 1837 – June 4, 1877) is buried at Green-Wood (AKA Greenwood) Cemetery in Greenwood Heights, Kings County, New York.

=== Cragside ===
A part of the Butterfield estate, "Cragside", is named for the rocky cliffs on the property. The house was built from the rock quarried on the property. The property was by all accounts a beautiful estate with elaborate gardens. Some of the stables from the estate are still standing and used by the Haldane Central School District. Cragside was purchased around 1931 by the Fathers of Mercy. Founded in France in early 19th-century, the congregation established the parish of St. Vincent de Paul Church in Manhattan in 1841 for French-speaking Catholics. The Cold Spring property was the location of St. Joseph's Novitiate. The structure was destroyed by fire in the late 1970s. The property was later sold, and eventually acquired by the Haldane Central School District. Haldane's high school building was built on the property and opened in 2005.

== In popular culture ==
Butterfield appears in the Civil War novel The Killer Angels by Michael Shaara – a character in the 20th Maine claims that their brigade bugle call was written by Butterfield and is based on his own name. Butterfield mentions this in a letter he wrote about writing Taps. Butterfield was also referenced in the movie Glory.

== See also ==
- List of American Civil War Medal of Honor recipients: A–F
- List of American Civil War generals (Union)

Military offices
Preceded by Joseph Hooker	Commander of the Fifth Army Corps; November 16, 1862 – December 25, 1862	Succeeded by George Meade
