= Antoon Verschoot =

Belgian firefighter and bugler

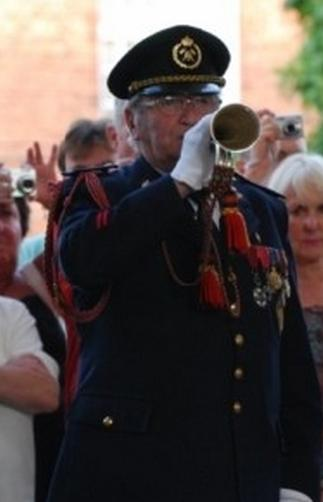
Antoon Verschoot

Antoon Verschoot, MBE, Order of the Crown (Belgium) (Ypres, 19 June 1925 - 1 February 2017) was a Belgian firefighter and bugler who played the last post at the Menin Gate for many years.

== Background ==
On 12 December 2015, Antoon Verschoot played his final "Last Post" at the Menin Gate, after 65 years with the Ypres/Ieper fire brigade, which he joined in 1950. He became a bugler for the Last Post Association in 1954 making him the oldest and longest serving bugler with the Association. It is estimated that Verschoot played at The Gate over 15,000 times.
