= Tattoo (bugle call) =

Signal played at dusk and ceremonies

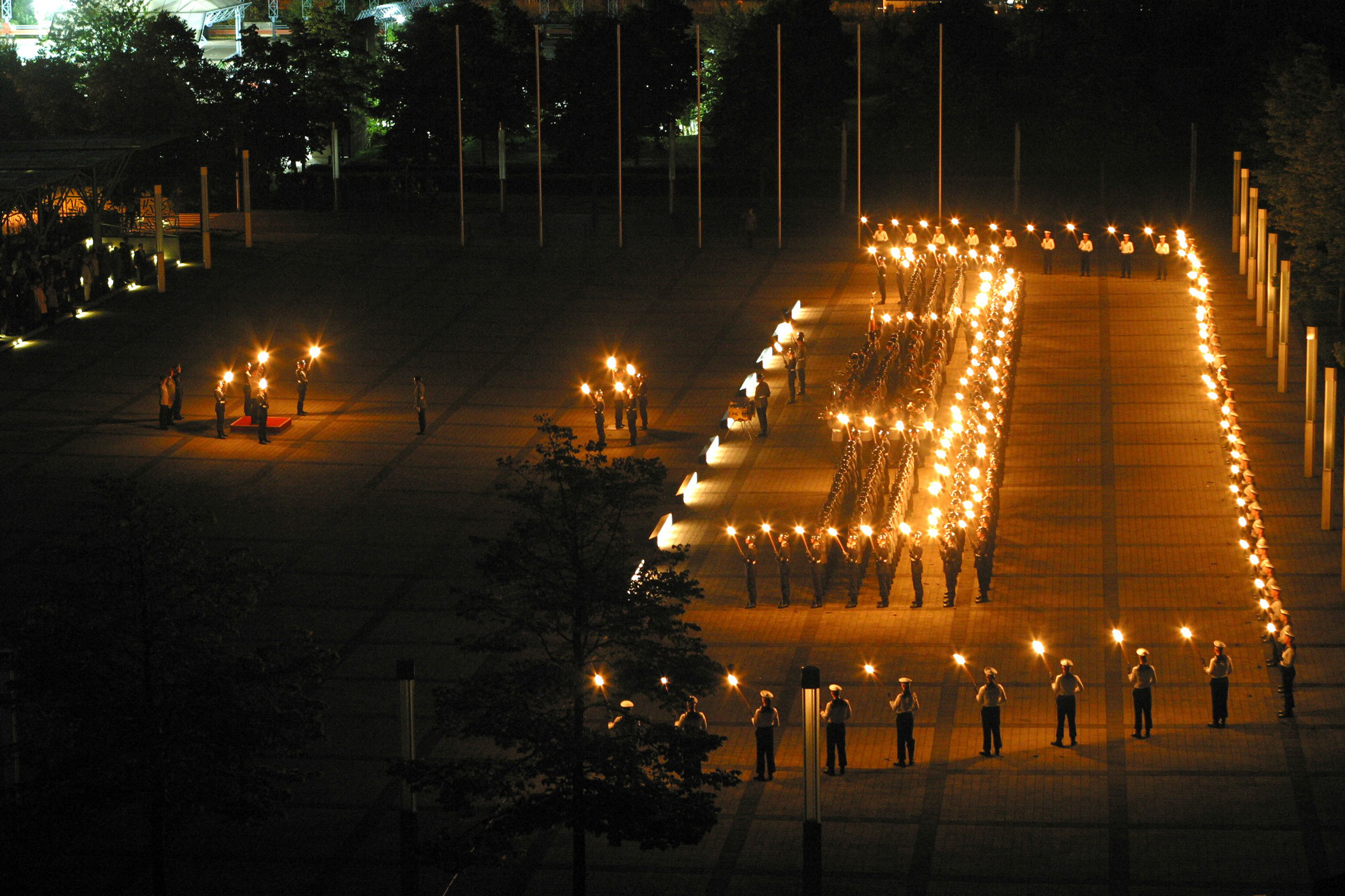
Tattoo bugle call ceremony in Germany

Tattoo is a bugle call played in the evening in the British Army and the United States Army.

The original concept of this call was played on the snare drum and was known as "tap-too", with the same rule applying. Later on, the name was applied to more elaborate military performances, known as military tattoos. The etymology of the military tattoo is from Dutch "tap toe", loosely translated as "shut off the tap" (of a keg or cask) before returning to quarters for the night. The word is unrelated to the Tahitian origin of an ink tattoo.

== United States Army ==
In the United States Army, the tattoo signals that all light in squad rooms be extinguished and that all loud talking and other disturbances be discontinued within 15 minutes, at which time "Taps" should follow. At 28 bars long "Tattoo" is recognized as the longest bugle call in the repertoire of the United States Army.

Tattoo
Tattoo played on the bugle by a member of the United States Army Band

Tattoo score

== British Army ==
The tattoo in the British Army is used to recall soldiers to their barracks. The call lasts twenty minutes, begins with "First Post", and ends with "Last Post".

== See also ==
- Military tattoo
