= Scott Tattoo =

Bugle call

"Scott Tattoo" is a bugle call entitled "The Tattoo" first published in 1835, and thought to be the source of the bugle call known as "Taps".

== History ==
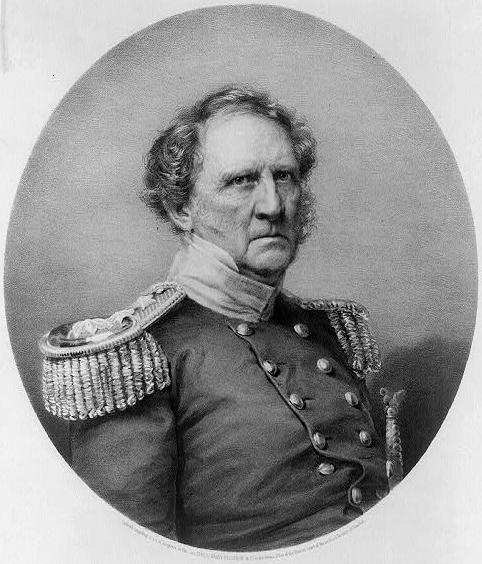
Gen. Winfield Scott

The call was published in musical notation in an American military manual written by Major General Winfield Scott, first published in 1835. The term "Scott Tattoo" was coined by Russell H. Booth in his 1977 magazine article Butterfield and "Taps" which first set forth the discovery of this earlier form of the essential Taps melody. In military manuals of the 19th century there were multiple versions of bugle calls named "Tattoo," so the term "Scott Tattoo" was needed to identify the particular version of Tattoo from which "Taps" arose. It is speculated that the "Scott Tattoo" itself may have come from earlier calls or earlier publications yet to be discovered.

Bugles served as the command, control and communications systems of the day. "The "Scott Tattoo" was general bugle call used to notify soldiers to cease the evening's drinking and return to their garrisons.

=== "Taps" ===
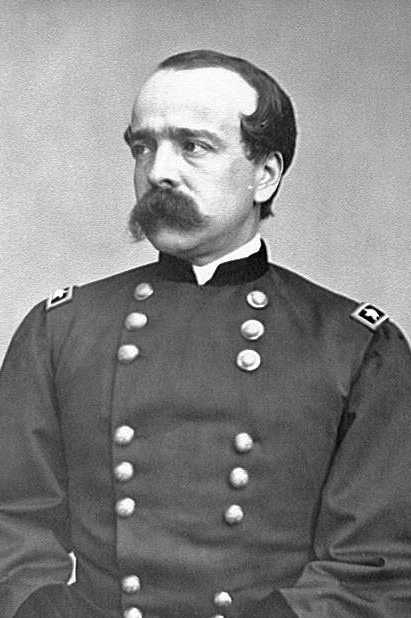
Gen. Daniel Butterfield

"Taps" was composed by General Daniel Butterfield during the American Civil War. In July 1862, the Army of the Potomac was encamped at Harrisons Landing on the James River in Virginia following the Seven Days Battle. "Taps" began as general bugle call to replace a previous “Tattoo” — a lengthy, brisk combination of the French bugle call "To Extinguish Lights" and the British call “Last Post.” Tattoo was sounded for lights out to close the soldier's day in the mid 1800s. General Butterfield felt Tattoo was too formal to signal the day's end. Butterfield's music traces its origin to the "Scott Tattoo". A half-tempo modification of the last five and a quarter bars of the "Scott Tattoo" creates the call we now know as "Taps."

General Butterfield was known to have been familiar with the Scott manual and knew how to sound bugle calls. He called upon brigade bugler Pvt. Oliver Wilcox Norton, to help him adjust the pitch and timing of notes for a new bugle call, now known simply as "Taps", and may have based it on memory of the earlier call. It was not until some time later, when generals of other commands had heard it, that permission was given to substitute it throughout the Army of the Potomac. Later in the war, Taps would be played at burials in lieu of the three volleys of rifle fire since it was thought the sound of the gunshots might be mistaken for enemy fire.
