= The Rouse =

Bugle call to get soldiers out of bed

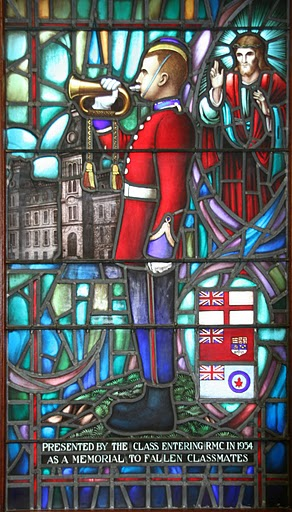
Memorial Stained Glass window, Class of 1934, Royal Military College of Canada features an Officer Cadet bugler playing "Last Post" or "The Rouse"

"The Rouse" is a bugle call most often associated with the military in Commonwealth countries. It is commonly played following "Last Post" at military services. It is sometimes called the "Reveille" or the "Levet".

Despite often being referred to by the name "Reveille", "The Rouse" is actually a separate piece of music from the traditional "Reveille". "The Rouse" was traditionally played following "Reveille", which was a bugle call played in the morning to wake soldiers up. "The Rouse" would be played to let soldiers know that they should already be out of bed.

The use of both "Last Post" and "The Rouse" at cenotaph ceremonies in Commonwealth nations essentially turns the two-minute silence into a ritualized night vigil. The selection of "The Rouse" in the ceremony as assembled in the aftermath of the First World War also carries a subtle Christian reference to Judgement Day and the implied hope that there will be a day when the living and the dead arise together.

Because of the close association between the two tunes, "The Rouse" is commonly mistaken for "Reveille", and has taken on many of the functions "Reveille" traditionally held in remembrance ceremonies (such as those on Remembrance Day) due to its shorter length and the ease with which it can be played.

== Music ==
"The Rouse"

The Rouse

Being bugle music, both "The Rouse" and "Reveille" are composed entirely from the written notes of the brass instrument's harmonic series C major (i.e. C, G, C, E, G etc), these being the only notes available on the instrument.
