= Reveille =

Bugle call at sunrise

Reveille
Reveille played on the bugle by a member of the United States Army Band

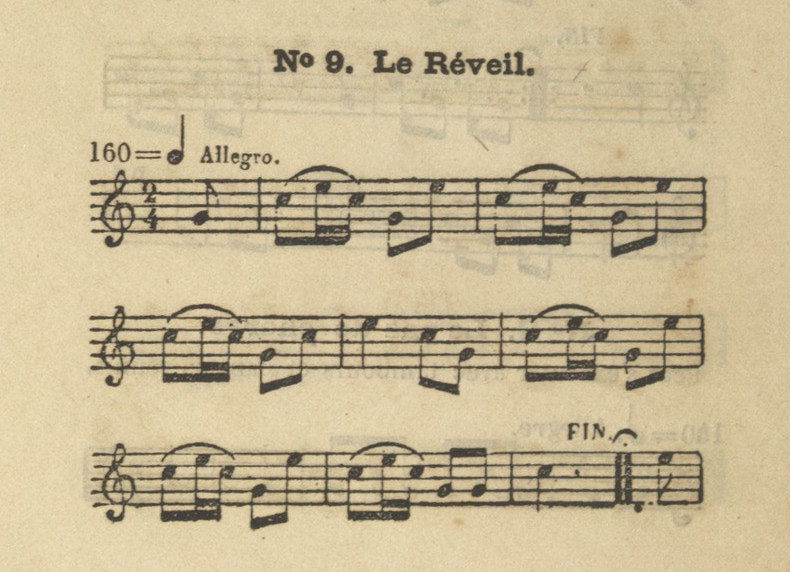
Musical notation of "Le Réveil" from French military rules book published July, 29 1884

"Reveille" (US: /ˈrɛvəli/ REV-əl-ee, UK: /rɪˈvæli/ rih-VAL-ee), called in French "Le Réveil" is a bugle call, trumpet call, drum, fife-and-drum or pipes call most often associated with the military; it is chiefly used to wake military personnel at sunrise. The name comes from réveille (or réveil), the French word for "wake up".

== Commonwealth of Nations and the United States ==
The tunes used in the Commonwealth of Nations are different from the one used in the United States, but they are used in analogous ways: to ceremonially start the day. British Army cavalry and Royal Horse Artillery regiments sound a call different from the infantry versions, known as "The Rouse" but often misnamed "Reveille", while most Scottish regiments of the British Army sound a pipes call of the same name, to the tune of "Hey, Johnnie Cope, Are Ye Waking Yet?", a tune that commemorates the Battle of Prestonpans. For the Black Watch, since the Crimean War, "Johnnie Cope" has been part of a sequence of pipe tunes played at an extended reveille on the 15th of every month known as "Crimean Long Reveille".

The U.S. Reveille is in fact the French one. In modern times, the U.S. military plays (or sounds) "Reveille" in the morning, generally near sunrise, though its exact time varies from base to base. On U.S. Army posts and Air Force bases, "Reveille" is played by itself or followed by the bugle call "To the Colors" at which time the national flag is raised and all U.S. military personnel outdoors are required to come to attention and present a salute in uniform, either to the flag or in the direction of the music if the flag is not visible. While in formation, soldiers are brought to the position of parade rest while "Reveille" plays then called to attention and present arms as the national flag is raised. When in a vehicle, personnel are expected to stop and render honors. On board U.S. Navy, Marine Corps, and Coast Guard facilities, "Reveille" is generally sounded separately from morning colors. "Reveille" is sounded at an earlier time such as 06:00 (6 am), and then the flag is generally raised at 08:00 (8 am) while "The Star-Spangled Banner" or the bugle call "To the Colors" is played. On some U.S. military bases, "Reveille" is accompanied by a cannon shot.

In Commonwealth Remembrance Day and Remembrance Sunday services, and ANZAC Day services, "Last Post" begins the period of silent reflection, and "Reveille" ends it. The two tunes symbolize sunset and sunrise respectively, and therefore, death and resurrection. ("Reveille" is often replaced by "The Rouse", a bugle call commonly mistaken for "Reveille", although these are actually two different tunes.) Winston Churchill had "Last Post" sounded at his funeral, followed by "Reveille", as did Prince Philip, Duke of Edinburgh and Queen Elizabeth II.

"To Reveille" or "to sound Reveille" is often used among military personnel as a term meaning "to notify personnel that it is time to wake up", whether the bugle call is actually sounded or not. Units lacking the personnel or equipment necessary to play the tune will often assign the duty to "sound Reveille" to the last watch of the night, who must ensure that others are roused at the proper time, by any appropriate means (often by actually shouting the word reveille until everyone is awake).

The "Reveille" is still played in all the Australian Defence Forces. It was originally played by drums.

=== Lyrics ===
==== Australia ====
Although there are no official lyrics to "Reveille", these unofficial lyrics for the Commonwealth "Reveille" have been recently popularized:

Re-veil-lee! Re-veil-lee is sounding
The bugle calls you from your sleep; it is the break of day.
You've got to do your duty or you will get no pay.
Come, wake yourself, rouse yourself out of your sleep
And throw off the blankets and take a good peek at all
The bright signs of day are here, so get up and do not delay.

Get up!

Or-der-ly officer is on his round!
And if you're still a-bed he will send you to the guard
And then you'll get a drill and that will be a bitter pill:
So be up when he comes, be up when he comes,
Like a soldier at his post, a soldier at his post, all serene.

==== British ====
The first lines of the British Cavalry "Reveille" were for many years rendered as:

Soldiers arise!
Scrub the bloody muck out of your eyes...

The infantry and general "Rouse" ran:

Get out of bed,
Get out of bed,
You lazy bastards! (repeat)
I feel sorry for you, I do!

The "Reveille" and "Rouse" are two separate calls which are often confused. The "Reveille" is the first bugle sound of the day to awaken the troops. See the words above, in the Australian section (it is the same as British). The "Rouse" is the second call and, shorter call, sounded after "Reveille" to remind people that they should now be well up and about. On ceremonial occasions, "Rouse" is often sounded instead of "Reveille" because it is shorter and much easier to play. The Goon Show featured as the introduction of 'Bloodnok's Rock and Roll', the first four bars of the Revelle in 4/4 time, followed by Secombe: "Company 'shun! Shoulder Arms! From the right...Number!"...

In the Royal Navy, "Reveille" was usually verbalized, preceded by a blast from the bo'sun's call as:

Wakey wakey, lash up and stow!

Often, even in modern times, this was extended with other bits and pieces, often a weather report, and sometimes even comical rhymes thought up by the quartermaster. An example heard on board the frigate HMNZS Canterbury (F421) in 1979 went thus: "Wakey, wakey, rise and shine, get up, get up, the day is fine, the birds are singing, so why don't you? And if you can't sing then you know what you can do! Don't turn over... Turn Out!" (The quartermaster in question was admonished severely by the officer of the day.)

==== United States ====
To the U.S. tune:

I can't get 'em up,
I can't get 'em up,
I can't get 'em up this morning;
I can't get 'em up,
I can't get 'em up,
I can't get 'em up at all!
The corporal's worse than the privates,
The sergeant's worse than the corporals,
Lieutenant's worse than the sergeants,
And the captain's worst of all!
(repeat top six lines)

Another set of lyrics to the U.S. tune above:

I can't get 'em up
I can't get 'em up
I can't get 'em up this morning;
I can't get 'em up
I can't get 'em up
I can't get 'em up at all!
And tho' the sun starts peeping,
And dawn has started creeping,
Those lazy bums keep sleeping,
They never hear my call!
(repeat top six lines)

Still another U.S. version goes:

You've got to get up
You've got to get up
You've got to get up this morning
You've got to get up
You've got to get up
Get up with the bugler's call
The major told the captain
The captain told the sergeant
The sergeant told the bugler
The bugler told them all
(repeat top six lines)

Most famous is Irving Berlin's comic adaption of the tune and the lyrics in his 1918 song "Oh! How I Hate to Get Up in the Morning", inspired by his experience as a draftee in the First World War. Recast from the original military 2/4 time to a more swinging 6/8 rhythm, the words

You gotta get up
You gotta get up
You gotta get up this morning

are set to the initial notes of the bugle call, followed by

Some day I'm going to murder the bugler
Some day they're going to find him dead;
I'll amputate his reveille and step upon it heavily,
And spend the rest of my life in bed.

=== Music ===
"Reveille" and "Rouse" are composed, like nearly all bugle music, solely from the notes of the major triad, usually notated in C as: C, the tonic; E, the mediant; and G, the dominant.

Both the Commonwealth and United States "Reveilles" can be played with any combination of valves (or all open valves), because they were first played on a bugle, which lacks valves and plays only notes from the harmonic series.

Reveille
Reveille played on the bugle by a member of the United States Army Band

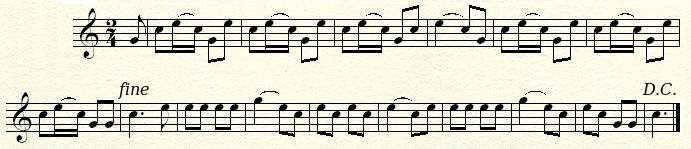
The U.S. version of "Reveille"

== Australia ==
"Reveille" is played as the first call of the day when in barracks. It also concludes the ANZAC day dawn service. "Rouse" is played at the conclusion of silence for other commemorative services.

== Denmark ==
The "Reveille" was previously used throughout the Royal Danish Army, but is now only played at sunrise and sunset at the Guard Hussar Regiment barracks, by buglers from the mounted squadron's drum and bugle corps. It is also played every morning at the Royal Life Guard barracks in Copenhagen while the flag is hoisted at the garrison.

== Germany ==
"Reise Reise" is the wake up call on ships of the German Navy, the Deutsche Marine. It comes from the Low German word for rise. Every day on a German Navy ship starts with a wake-up call, the Purren, which is started by the Locken, a whistle from the boatswain's call given 5 minutes before the main wake-up call. The wake-up call is given by a long whistle and the call: Reise, reise, aufstehen, überall zurrt Hängematten ('Rise, rise, wake up, get your hammock ready').

== India ==
In the Indian Army, "Reveille" is sounded at 06:00 (or sunrise), and the regimental colours are hoisted. As this also signals the start of the physical training parade, for practical reasons, servicemen must awake prior to the sounding of reveille.

== Ireland ==
In the Irish Army, "Reveille" is sounded at dawn and at military wreath-laying ceremonies, as on the National Day of Commemoration.

== Sweden ==
In Sweden, "Revelj" can be played on bugle, trumpet or drum. Today, it is usually played from a recording. There is also a reveille for military band composed by Johann Heinrich Walch that is used as the reveille of the Swedish Armed Forces.

== United States ==
In the U.S. military, Reveille is generally played at 6:30 a.m. as the morning bugle call. It was originally conducted in 1811 as "Troop", and was designed to muster the unit or for roll call, but later came to mark when the flag was raised in the morning and honors paid to it.

=== Boy Scouts of America ===
Within the Boy Scouts of America, it is common for "Reveille" to be sounded as a "wake up" for a large encampment of scouts, usually a camporee, jamboree or summer camp. The music may be played over the camp's intercom or bugled or trumpeted by the camp bugler. An individual scout unit may also sound "Reveille" to rouse the scouts and scouters on a weekend trip, though this is less common.

Troop Bugler is a position of leadership in some troops.

An instrumental rock version of the melody was recorded as "Reveille Rock" in 1959 by Johnny and the Hurricanes and released on Warwick Records, catalog number M-513. The record charted Billboard number 25 and number 14 in the UK.
