= Ich hatt' einen Kameraden =

Traditional lament of German armed forces

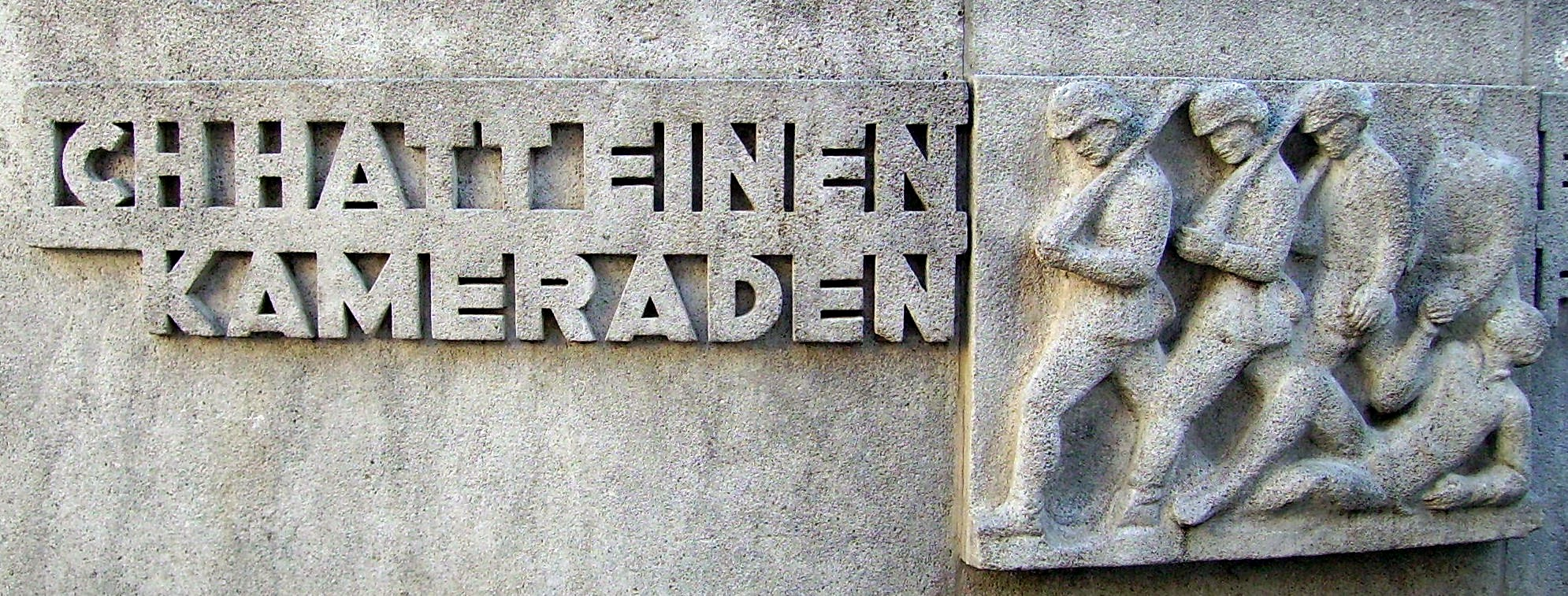
War memorial fountain in Speyer

"Der gute Kamerad" ("The Good Comrade"), also known by its opening line as "Ich hatt' einen Kameraden" ("I had a comrade"), is a traditional German soldiers' lament. The lyrics were written by German romantic poet Ludwig Uhland in 1809. Its immediate inspiration was the deployment of Badener troops against the Tyrolean Rebellion. In 1825, the Lieder composer Friedrich Silcher set it to music, based on the tune of a Swiss folk song, in honor of those who fell during the more recent Wars of Liberation against the French Imperial Army of Napoleon Bonaparte.

The lyrics are about the universal wartime experience of losing a friend in combat, while completely detached from any political or nationalist ideology, and twice shift from past tense to present tense in order to explore the subject of traumatic flashbacks, survivor's guilt, and what is now called PTSD. As a result, the song's appeal was overwhelming and has never been limited to any one country or political ideology. It was widely sung and used across the political and nationalist spectrum by both right and left throughout the 19th, 20th, and 21st centuries, and its lyrics have been translated into multiple languages for use in numerous military forces, French, Dutch, Spanish, and Japanese amongst others.

== Usage ==
Ernst Busch used the tune for his eponymous Spanish Civil War song about the death of Hans Beimler. German playwright Carl Zuckmayer in 1966 used the song's line "Als wär's ein Stück von mir" as the title for his autobiography (English title: A Part of Myself).

"The Good Comrade" still plays an important ceremonial role in the Austrian and German armed forces and remains an integral part of each military funeral, continuing a tradition started at least around 1871.

The song has also become traditional in obsequies of the Austrian firebrigades. In the German-speaking Italian province of South Tyrol, the piece is played at funerals of volunteer firefighters and during remembrance ceremonies held by the Schützenbund. The Chilean Armed Forces and the National Army of Colombia also utilize it, though Chile does not exclusively use it for funerals or remembrance ceremonies. The song was adopted by the French Foreign Legion as early as the 19th century.

Occasionally the song is played at civilian funeral ceremonies, most often when the deceased had been affiliated with the military.

Its use was also common in the formerly German-speaking region surrounding St. Cloud, Minnesota, which was largely settled in the 1850s by Catholic immigrants invited by local missionary Fr. Francis Xavier Pierz. According to local historian Fr. Colman J. Barry, during the traditional parish feast day picnics and old country festivals that, very similarly to the Pennsylvania Dutch Fersommling, were very much a central pillar of "Stearns County German culture", it was particularly common at for German-American Union Army veterans of the American Civil War to stand up and sing, Ich hatt' einen Kameraden, with tears and intense emotion, in honor of their fallen friends. (see German Americans in the American Civil War).

On 22 May 2009, an all-Flemish band performed the lament on the Great Highland bagpipes and drums during a joint Belgian, British, and German memorial ceremony at the Langemark German war cemetery in Belgium. In addition to the flying ace Werner Voss (1897-1917), the cemetery contains the graves of more than 44,000 German and 2 British soldiers who fell during the First World War.

It is also commonly sung at the funerals of members of a Studentenverbindung. The song is often played on the trumpet during the annual wreath laying ceremonies at the Neue Wache along Unter den Linden, Germany's national war memorial, on Volkstrauertag or Remembrance Day and every 20 July at the Memorial to the German Resistance inside the courtyard of the Bendlerblock in Berlin.

This is because the legacy of the 20 July plot to assassinate Adolf Hitler and overthrow the Nazi Party has permanently changed the ideology of the German armed forces. Since its creation during West German rearmament in the 1950s, the modern Bundeswehr holds that military officers and enlisted men have a moral duty (German: Innere Führung) which goes beyond blind obedience to superior orders, and that the Wehrmacht and Abwehr officers who plotted to kill Hitler were not traitors, but heroes, martyrs, and national icons who died trying to save the German people from continued rule by a genocidal police state.

== Text ==
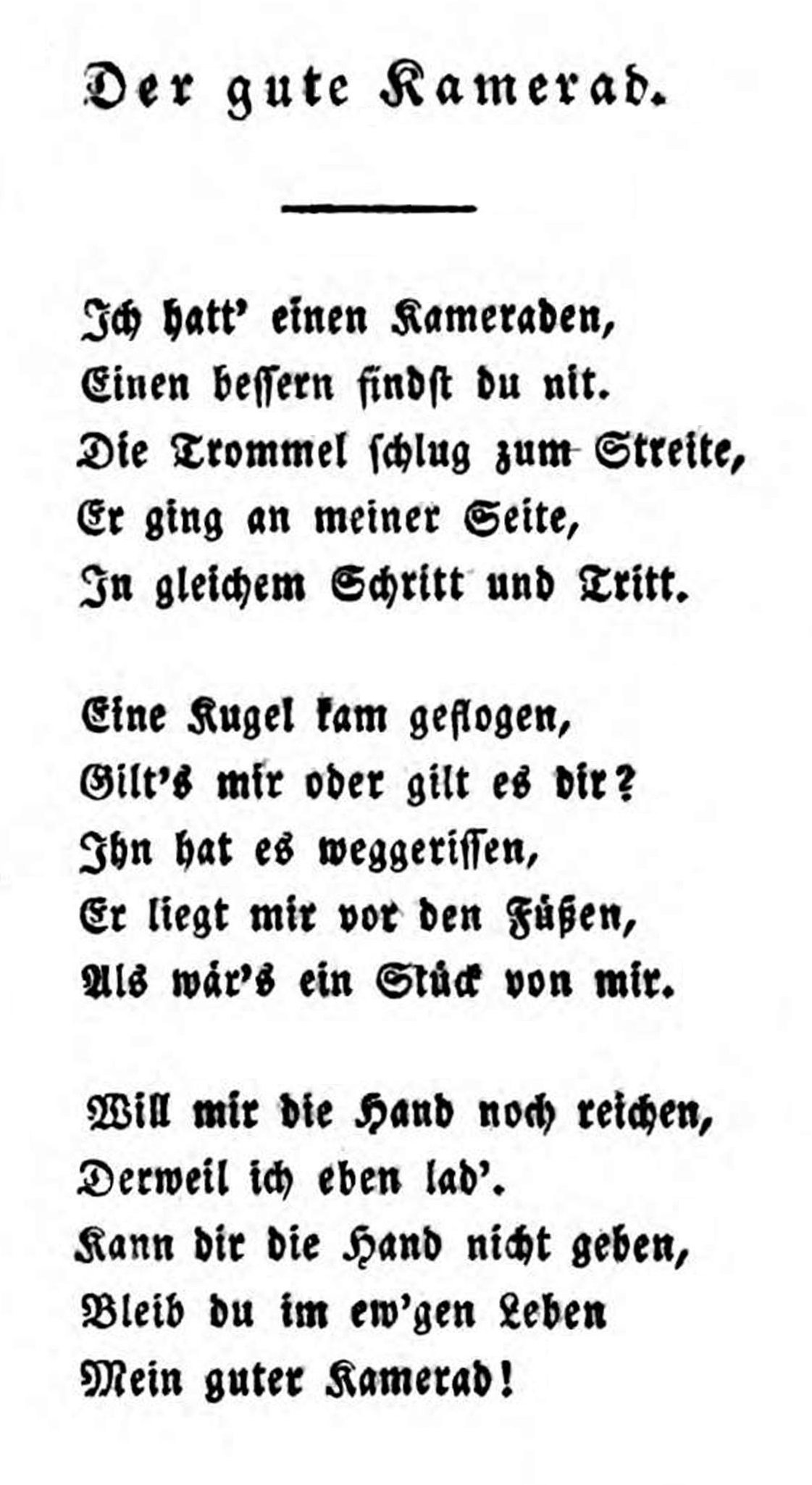
Uhland's text

Ich hatt' einen Kameraden,
Einen bessern findst du nicht.
Die Trommel schlug zum Streite,
Er ging an meiner Seite
In gleichem Schritt und Tritt.

Eine Kugel kam geflogen:
Gilt's mir oder gilt es dir?
Ihn hat es weggerissen,
Er liegt zu meinen Füßen
Als wär's ein Stück von mir.

Will mir die Hand noch reichen,
Derweil ich eben lad.
Kann dir die Hand nicht geben,
Bleib du im ew'gen Leben
Mein guter Kamerad!

Translation:

I once had a comrade,
You won't find a better one.
The drum sounded for battle,
He walked at my side,
At the same pace and step.

A bullet came by flying,
Is it my turn or is it yours?
He was swept away,
He lies at my feet,
As if he were a part of me.

He still reaches out his hand to me,
While I am about to reload.
Can't give you the hand,
Remain in eternal life,
My good comrade."

The above text is Uhland's original version. Various variants have been recorded over the years.

Heymann Steinthal in an 1880 article in Zeitschrift für Völkerpsychologie noted a variant he heard sung by a housemaid, "Die Kugel kam geflogen / Gilt sie mir? Gilt sie dir?" (i.e. "the bullet came flying" instead of "a bullet". Steinthal argued that this version was an improvement over Uhland's text, making reference to the concept of a "fateful bullet" in military tradition and giving a more immediate expression of the fear felt by the soldier in the line of fire.
