= La muerte no es el final =

Song

"La Muerte No Es El Final" (Death Is Not The End) is a Christian song,, which was composed by the Spanish priest Cesáreo Gabaráin Azurmendi (1936–1991), after the death of Juan Pedro, a young organist in his church. Gabaráin composed hundreds of religious songs, some of them known worldwide such as "Pescador de Hombres".

The Spanish Armed Forces later adopted the song as a hymn to pay tribute to those who died in military service.
