= Military tradition =

Practices associated with a military unit

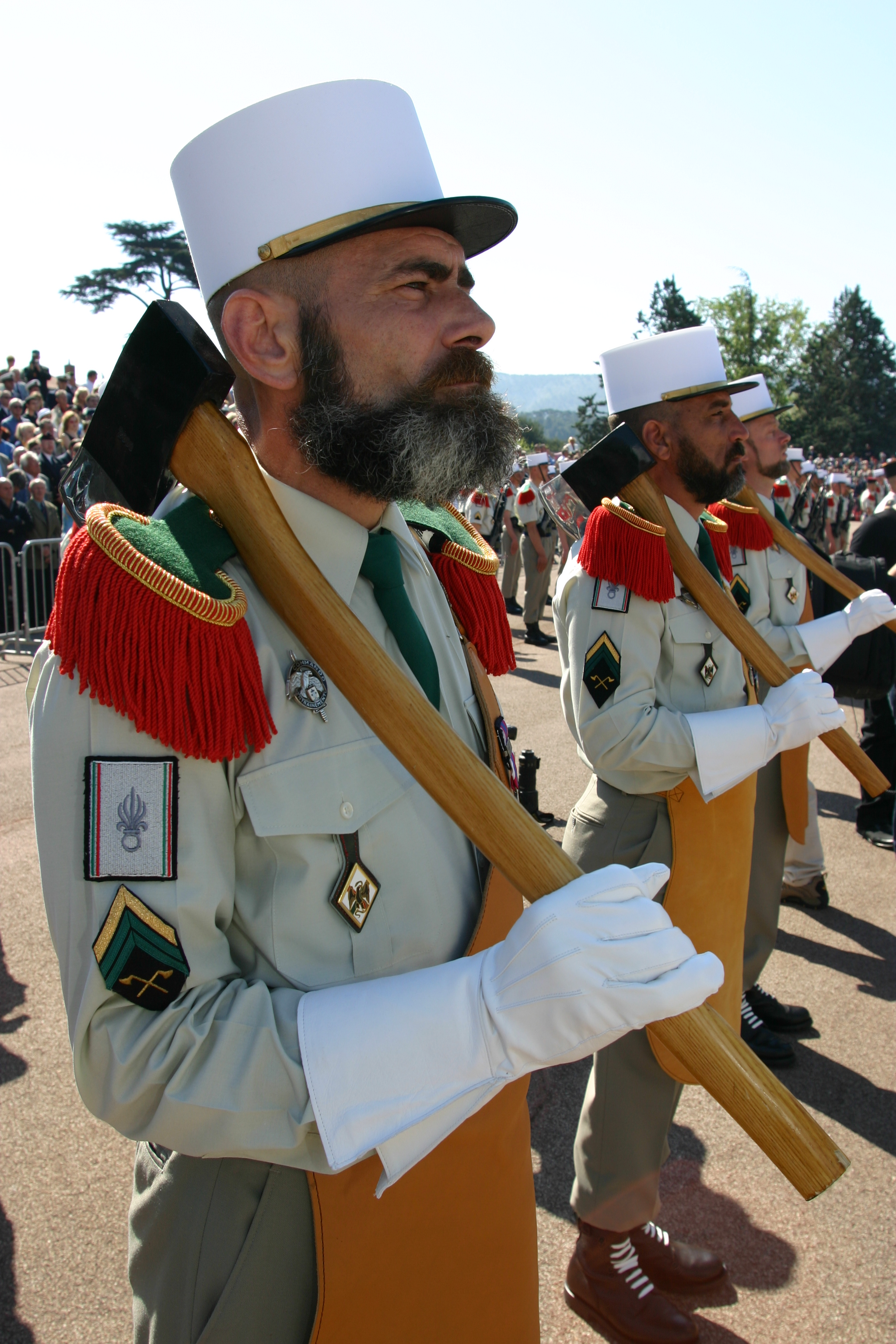
The Pionniers (pioneers) are the combat engineers and a traditional unit of the French Foreign Legion. The sapeurs of the Legion traditionally sport large beards, wear leather aprons and gloves and hold axes.

Military traditions are customs, symbols, ceremonies and practices through which an armed force, service or unit preserves selected parts of its past. They include distinctive uniforms, insignia, drill, military music, commemorations and unit histories. Military culture is broader term than military tradition. It includes the shared values, beliefs, norms, symbols, language, and behaviors that define a military organisation's identity and its members' goals. Traditions are one way through which culture is expressed and transmitted.

== Concept and transmission ==
Military culture is communicated through both formal instruction and everyday social practices. Traditions, deployment, rituals, vocabulary, and shared values shape interactions among personnel and transform civilians into military members.

Military tradition is not immutable. Militaries may abandon practices incompatible with professional ethics. The U.S. Army classifies rituals like "blood wings" as hazing. The United States Army prohibits hazing in any form, with the policy applying to Active, Guard and Reserve soldiers, as well as Army civilians and contractors.

=== Military music ===
Armies once used drums, fifes, trumpets, and bugles for audible signalling across battlefields and camps, covering tactical orders (advance, halt, assault, cease fire) and daily routine calls. This order-by-instrument practice is termed celeustic music.

Telegraphy ended most battlefield uses of bugle calls, but they remain in military routines and ceremonies. In the United States Army, Reveille and Retreat mark the beginning and end of the duty day and accompany flag ceremonies.

Military music has served signalling, morale, ceremony and unit identity, with modern primary use as ceremonial.

=== Commemoration ===
Some military practices evolve into public commemorative rituals. The Last Post began as a daily bugle call. It is now sounded at military funerals and remembrance services.

=== Insignia and dress ===
Military insignia encode history and battle honors, starting from identification tools into symbols of identity.

=== Battle honours ===
Battle honours are granted to publicly acknowledge military units for their active engagement in combat against organized and armed conflicts. By attaching the names of earlier operations to a continuing unit, battle honours carved selected parts of its operational history as collective memory or identity.

=== Customs and courtesies ===
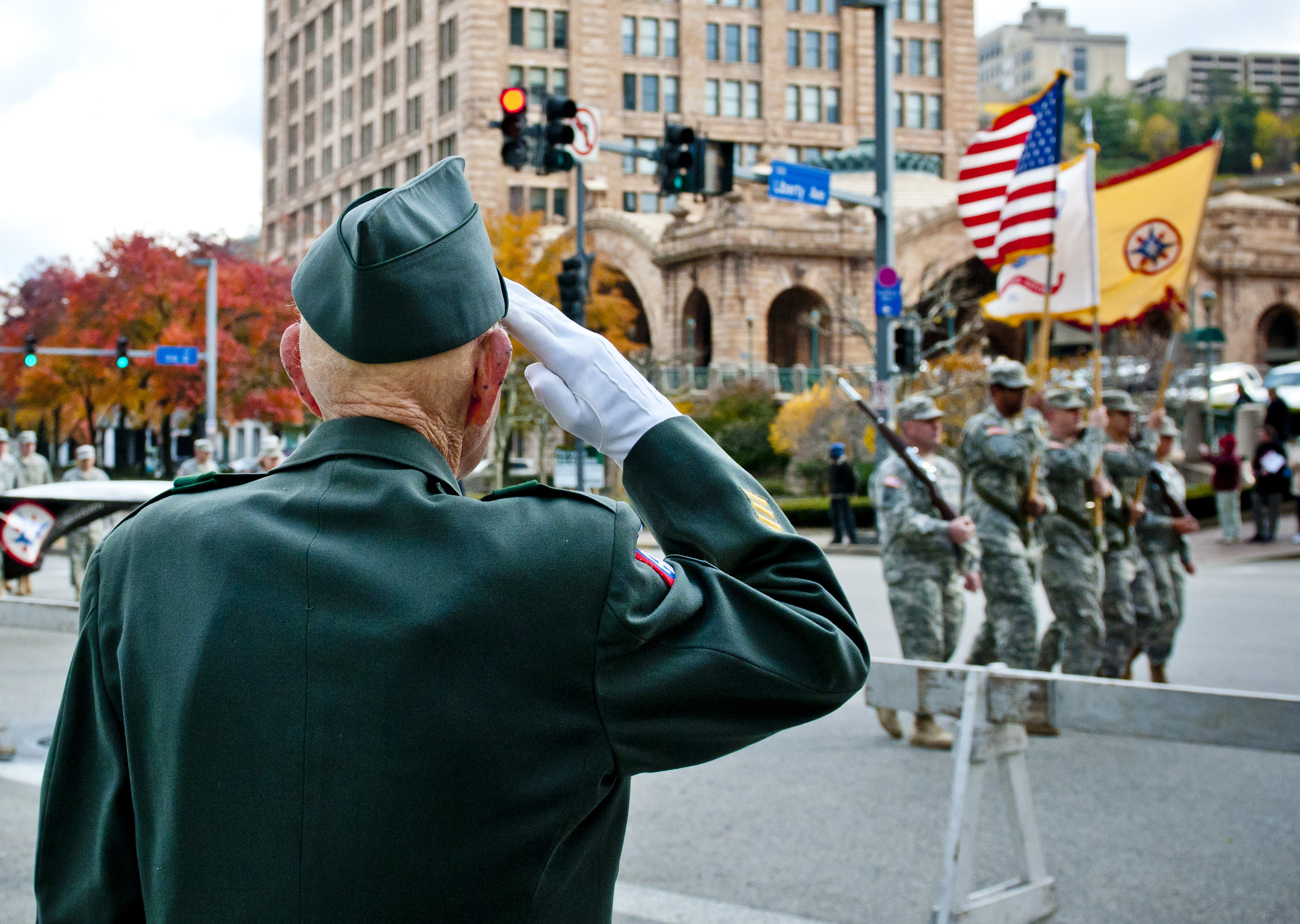
A retired United States Army first sergeant salutes the Colors during a Veterans Day parade in Pittsburgh.

The hand salute is a common courtesy used to express respect for rank, authority, flags, etc. Its origin is uncertain. In many armed forces, the gesture acknowledges the rank or office rather than the individual.

=== Mess ===
A military mess is a designated dining area for military personnels. The origins of formal military dining are uncertain. U.S. Army literature traces the dining-in to Viking victory feasts held to celebrate battles and feats of heroism. Another explanation form the United States Navy describes it as passing in medieval monasteries and early Christian universities before being adopted by military organizations. The better-documented history begins in the British Army. During the eighteenth century, formal dining became essential to the regimental mess system, where rules and customs of communal meals became increasingly enforced. British mess influenced its Commonwealth of Nations military traditions. The Canadian Armed Forces, for example, describe their mess following the British model.

Formal toasts are a feature of military dining. In the United States Army dining-in, their subjects and sequence are planned in advance according to protocol, unit traditions and the commander's preferences.

=== Military tattoos ===
A military tattoo was used for an evening signal. The term later came to mean ceremonial displays performed by military musicians.

== In Europe ==
European armed forces maintain traditions through regiments, connecting current members to past formations via names, insignia, ceremonies, battle honours, and uniforms.

Chivalry developed as an important ethical, social and martial ideal among the medieval European nobility and warrior elite, though it varied across time and place.

Within Europe a wide variety of separate military traditions developed until at least World War I. WWI and its social/political troubles disrupted many pre-war military traditions. Armies replaced colorful coats with khaki uniforms and became more mechanized. Post-WWI imperial collapses shifted power from the aristocracy to the working class.

=== In the United Kingdom ===
In Britain, military traditions developed primarily along regimental lines, taking the form of long-established regimental customs, insignia, badges and distinctive features of uniform. Since the late 1960s, a series of regimental mergers and disbandments have diluted British military tradition, although it still remains strong in the Guards Division.

The Ceremony of the Keys has taken place every night, locking of the Tower of London. Performed for 700 years, with the Chief Yeoman Warder and an escort from the Tower's military garrison.

Trooping the Colour is a British ceremonial tradition in which a battalion's Colour is carried through the ranks. Trooping the Colour was carried or trooped along the ranks.

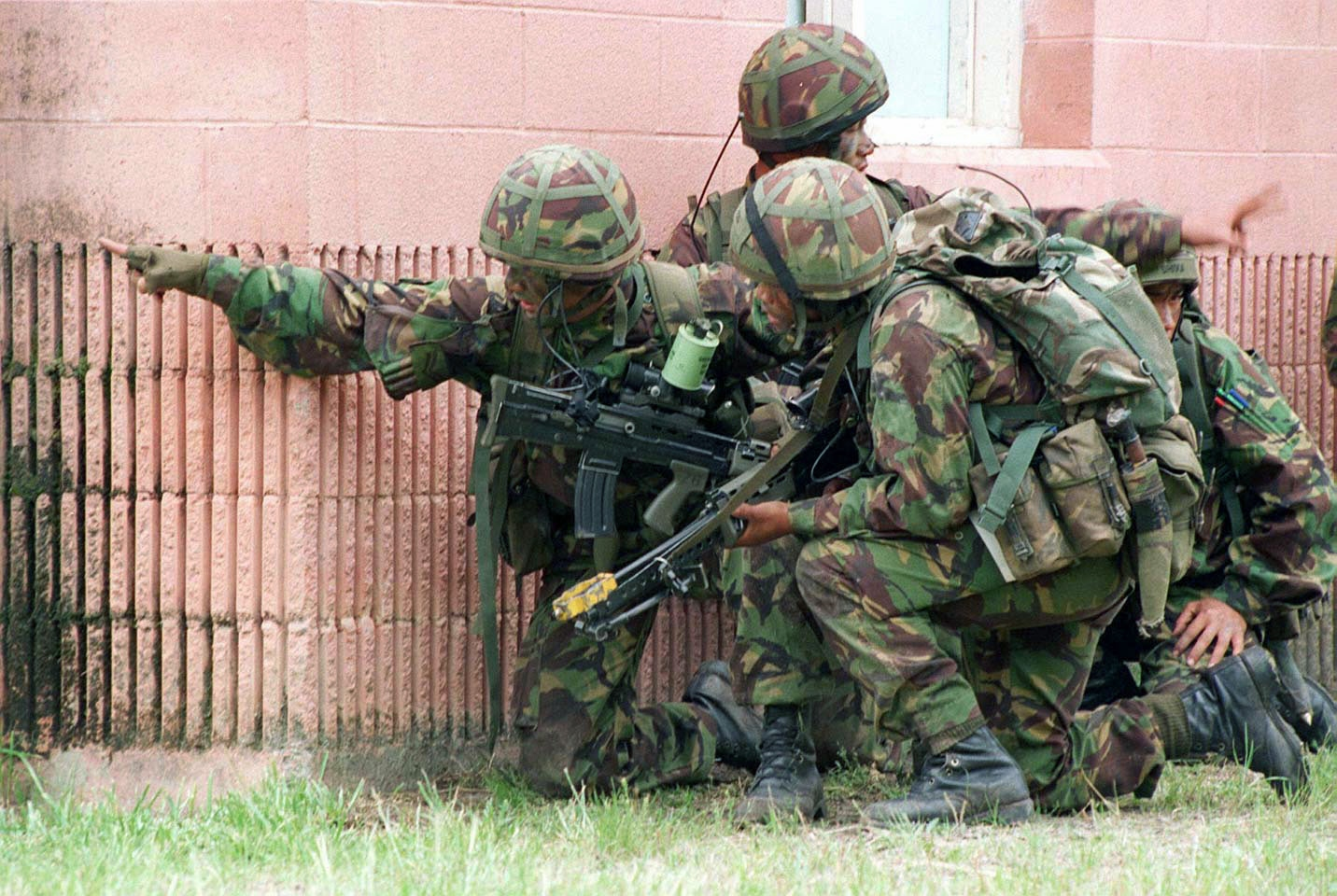
Soldiers of the Brigade of Gurkhas during a military exercise.

Royal Navy sailors traditionally received a daily rum ration, known as the “tot”. The practice ended on 31 July 1970. Royal Navy submariners traditionally earn their dolphins after learning the location and function of a submarine’s systems and completing their qualification. Royal Navy submarines may fly the Jolly Roger when returning from a successful combat mission.

Some British military personnel may keep up a animal mascots. Royal Fusiliers replaced their endangered blackbuck with an otterhound.

The Brigade of Gurkhas continues the recruitment of Nepalese soldiers begun by the East India Company in 1816. Four Gurkha regiments entered the British Army following the Partition of India in 1947.

The Light Dragoons continue former horse-cavalry reconnaissance. They now use Jackal 2 vehicles.

=== In Germany ===
For the Bundeswehr, tradition is a selective, value-based engagement, prioritising post-1955 history and only constitutionally compatible elements. The Bundeswehr ideal of the citizen in uniform comparable to Peelian principles, keeps soldiers' constitutional rights while imposing a special duty to defend the civic liberal democratic order. It forms the guiding principle of Innere Führung. The military resistance of 20 July 1944 is a central Bundeswehr tradition. In Prussia and later the German Empire, traditions were tied to local states. Even after German unification, like Prussia, Bavaria, Saxony and Württemberg retained elements of their separate military identities.

Frederick William I of Prussia's Potsdam Giants were famous for recruiting exceptionally tall soldiers.

The modern Bundeswehr explicitly draws on the military traditions of the Prussian Reform Movement of Gerhard von Scharnhorst, August Neidhardt von Gneisenau and other reformers after Prussia's defeat in the 1806 campaign against Napoleon. Its founding date, 12 November 1955, was chosen as the bicentenary of Scharnhorst's birth. Scharnhorst's reforms linked military renewal with education, professionalism, and meritocracy. The Prussian officer corps played Kriegsspiel to practise command with maps. By 1918, playing it formed part of every Imperial German officer’s education.

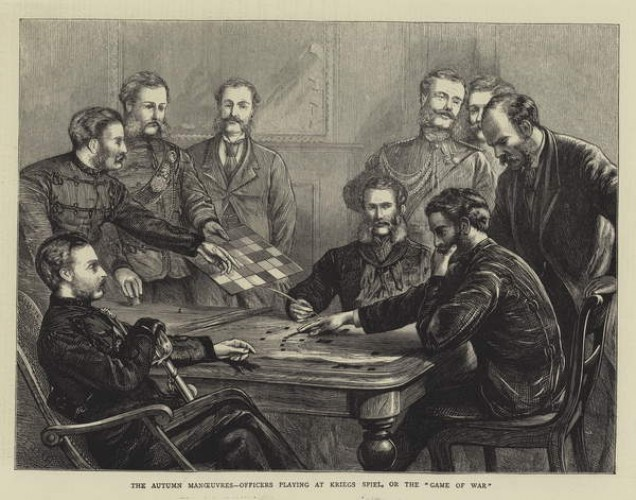
Army officers playing Kriegsspiel during military manoeuvres in 1872.

From the 1870s, free Kriegsspiel reduced rigid tables and allowed experienced players to judge results. Opposing received only position-specific information. Moltke the Elder combined war games and staff rides to prepare commanders for independent coordination during operations. The German officer corps developed the staff ride (German: Stabsreise). Officers studied tactical and operational problems on actual terrain. Like Kriegsspiel, it trained Auftragstaktik, staff work and command. The Reichswehr continued staff rides and wargaming during the interwar period, adapting them to the limits of the Treaty of Versailles. Interwar German exercises developed into large two-sided manoeuvre games. In the 1936 Hesse manoeuvres, nearly 50,000 soldiers from five divisions operated against one another; the 1937 Mecklenburg manoeuvres were about 160,000 personnel, 830 tanks and aircraft. The Bundeswehr continues the wargaming tradition.

The Portepee-Fähnrich was an examination to the Prussian officer corps that required candidates to prove a general education before war school. The transition to Fähnrich followed circular academic examinations. Following the thirteenth grade, at age nineteen, cadets would again be examined and, upon passing, gain a degree equivalent to the Abitur. In the late nineteenth-century Prussian Army, even upon graduation from the Kadettenschulen, cadets were not commissioned as officers but were promoted to Fähnrich (ensign), ranking just above sergeants. The German rank of Fähnrich originated with the medieval standard-bearer. Among the Landsknechts, the Fähnrich carried the banner, and was appointed by the Oberst. The title entered German armies for officer training. Once approved, Fähnrich officers received two years of specialist training. In the Reichswehr, officer training followed a stages, Kriegsschule instruction, examinations, field exercises and final qualification. Junior officer qualification took four years. The three-year War Academy course became compulsory for all officers. Wehrmacht Fahnenjunker trained at Kriegsschule and Truppenschule in Army Training Centres. WWII shortened courses, making front service both training and selection.

German Jäger originated from 17th-century foresters for skirmishing and reconnaissance. Jäger and reconnaissance continue the Horrido—Joho! call, as their response and battle cry.

German armour forces wear rose pink as their Waffenfarbe branch colour.

=== In France ===
The French created the concept of Esprit de corps, or the concept of pride in one's unit, within most elite or uniquely French units. North African units like the Zouaves, the tirailleurs, the French Foreign Legion, or even the Mamluks which served in Napoleon Bonaparte's Imperial Guard developed distinctive styles of dress. Many of these distinctive styles were later adopted by the French Metropolitan Army during the nineteenth century.

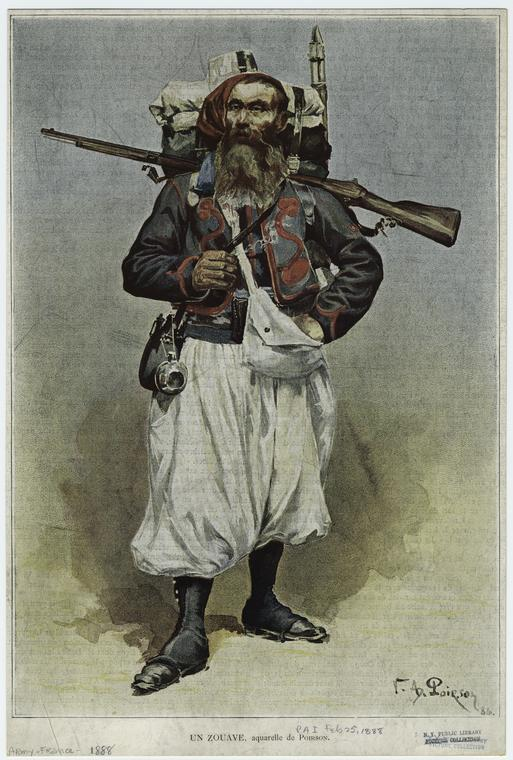
A French zouave from 1888 in the distinctive campaign uniform worn in North Africa. His trousers would normally be red.

Zouaves emerged in Algeria during the 1830 French conquest, initially with local mercenaries. Their name and distinctive dress later symbolized French colonial troops. The 1st Foreign Regiment is the oldest regiment of the French Foreign Legion. Founded in 1841, it maintains the Legion's ceremonial and historical roles, as well as its heritage and band.

The Battle of Camerone became the central tradition of the French Foreign Legion in 1931. Every Legion unit commemorates it on 30 April by reciting the battle narrative. At Aubagne, Captain Jean Danjou’s wooden hand is carried publicly.

The képi blanc is earned by completing the 70-kilometer Marche Képi Blanc . The Legion’s pioneers keep up practice of digging trenches saps. Wearing traditional gear and looks, pioneers lead Legion formations to symbolically "open the way," honoring their historical role clearing obstacles. The Chasseurs Alpins keep the specialised tradition of mountainous and winter warfare. Training combines climbing, skiing, snowshoes. The "tarte" beret shades, cushions, or warms. The Troupes de marine remembers the French Thin defence in Battle of Bazeilles during the Franco-Prussian War annually on 31 August and 1 September. The tradition recalls house-to-house and close-quarter fighting in an early instance of modern urban warfare.

French Spahi regiments started North African Arabs and Berber irregular cavalry in Algeria, Morocco and Tunisia and later joined the regular army. They served as scouts, escorts and vanguard and they fought throughout Europe from Crimea to the Western Front. Even after adopting khaki field dress, they wore North African headdress, loose garments and cloaks. During the Gulf War, the 1st Foreign Cavalry Regiment and 1st Spahi Regiment served as the primary reconnaissance regiments of the French 6th Light Armoured Division. Each equipped with AMX-10 RC.

Since 1829, each class of the Saint-Cyr military academy has selected a name recalling a soldier, commander, battle or historical event. Since 1934, each class has also adopted its own insignia. Since 1855, Saint-Cyr cadets wear red-and-white plumes called the casoar on their shakos.

=== Russia ===
The late Imperial Russian Army was recruited principally from the Russian rural population. Although Ukrainians, Tatars, Finns, Lithuanians, Poles, Circassians and other peoples also served. The ordinary soldier’s diet relied on rye bread, cabbage soup, porridge, potatoes, peas, beans and other staples. Soldiers sang about their villages, sweethearts, horses and admired commanders, while Cossack songs were vigorous choruses. The Kamarinskaya was among the dances Steveni observed, ordinarily accompanied by singing or concertina music. Soldiers used the Russian banya for hygiene and leisure, including winter bathing.

Most Russian military practices are modified Soviet continuations. The Soviet DOSAAF system still used for pre-draft military training in shooting, parachuting, aviation, driving, skiing, and fieldcraft.

== Japan ==
Bushidō has often been presented as an inherited code of the samurai, but historians have shown that its modern form was developed and popularised in the late nineteenth and early twentieth centuries. During the Meiji era, writers refashioned samurai models as a national character, later linking them to military traditions and nationalism. The postwar Japan Self-Defense Forces use awards and ceremonies to recognize service and reinforce unit cohesion. The Ministry of Defense states that personnel awarded badges and medals for metric contributions to their units may wear them at SDF ceremonies and other official occasions.

== United States ==
Military service sometimes extends across generations within American families. A 2011 Pew Research Center survey found that veterans were more likely than the general public to have immediate relatives who had served: 50 per cent had a veteran parent, 43 per cent had a veteran sibling and 21 per cent had a son or daughter who had served. This tradition is associated with the Southern United States and is seen in a high representation of Southerners in the U.S. military today and throughout the nation's history.

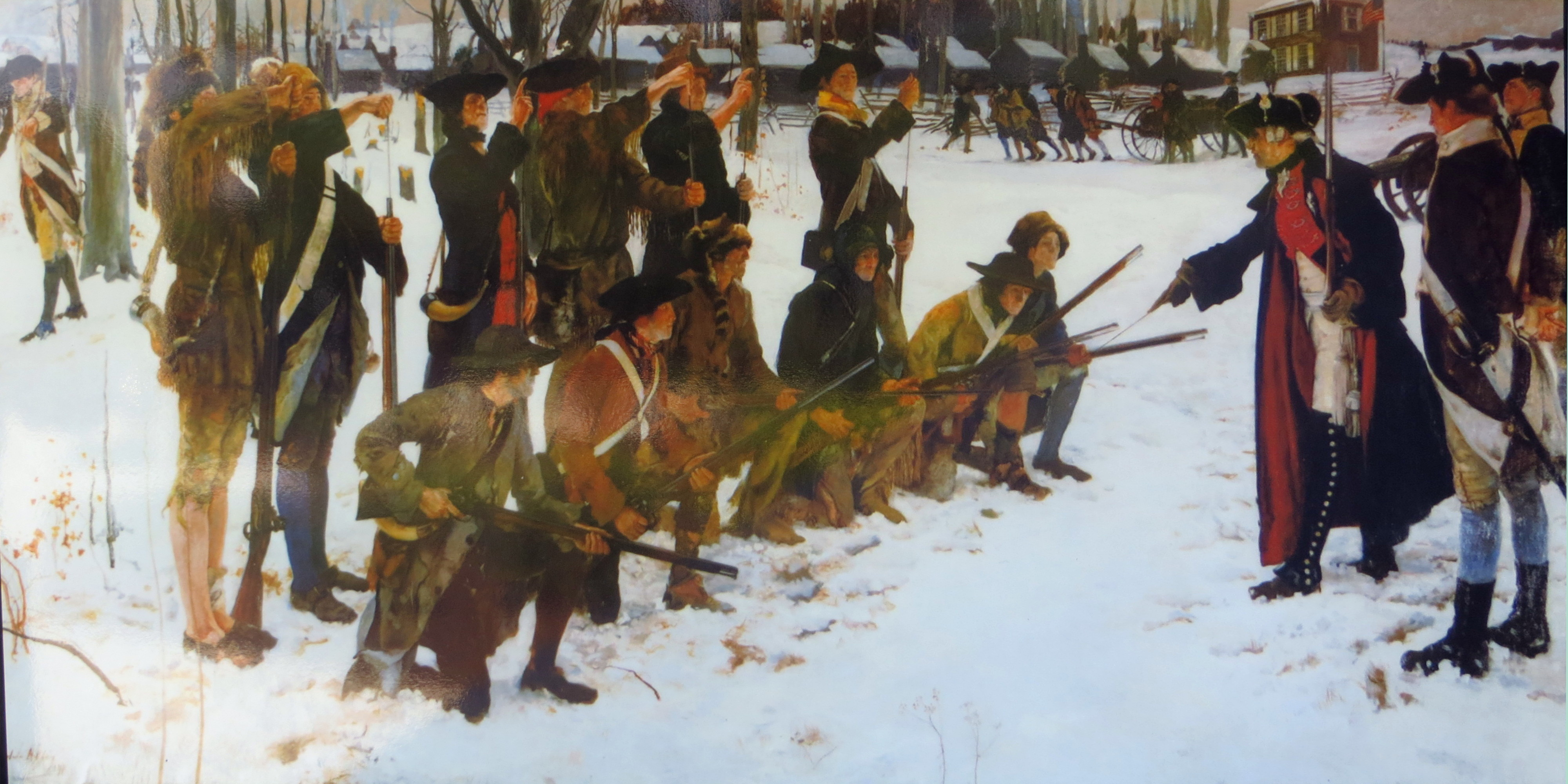
Baron von Steuben drilling Continental Army troops at Valley Forge, depicted by Edwin Austin Abbey.

American military drill was substantially standardized by Baron Friedrich von Steuben, who arrived at the Continental Army encampment at Valley Forge on 23 February 1778 and subsequently introduced a systematic program of drill and training. In 1779, he wrote Regulations for the Order and Discipline of the Troops of the United States, known as the Blue Book. Introduced at Valley Forge remained for 85 years, until the American Civil War, and its vocabulary survives till the current day.

TC 3-21.5 (successor to FM 3-21.5 and FM 22-5) now governs U.S. Army drill. During the retreat ceremony, Retreat marks the end of the duty day and is followed by To the Color, during which the national flag is lowered. Other U.S. Army ceremonial drills include change-of-command ceremonies, reviews and parades, guard mounting, military funerals, color ceremonies.

In the United States, the minimum military funeral-honours ceremony includes the playing of Taps and the folding and presentation of the national flag to the deceased's next of kin. Three rifle volleys over a grave differ from an artillery 21-gun salute.

In the United States, the Oath of Enlistment and Oath of Office traditions mark the entry into service and state strongly duty to the Constitution of the United States. These traditions are traced to oaths of the Continental Army in 1775, with the first constitutional oath adopted in 1789. As a recurring military tradition, the oath links generations of Soldiers through shared ideas of loyalty, duty, honor, trust.

Common U.S. Army dining-in toasts include those to the President of the United States, the Army, division, regiment and unit, generally in descending order of rank or importance. Traditionally, the junior officer present proposes the toast to the Army. When foreign guests attend, their heads of state may also be toasted. U.S. Army guidance allows a collective toast to foreign heads of state, followed by a senior foreign officer’s response. Field Artillery dining traditions may call Saint Barbara and a toast to the unit's heritage and comrades who have gone before us.

== In fiction ==
Military Tradition is used in the strategy game Sid Meier's Civilization III, released by Atari, as a technological advance that allows the building of cavalry units.

Military Tradition is a game concept in the strategy game Europa Universalis IV released by Swedish PC strategy game designer, Paradox Interactive. In the game, a player-controlled faction can accumulate Military Tradition by engaging in land battle. A higher Military Tradition value results in the ability to recruit generals and conquistadors of better quality.

Distinct elements of a military culture are also present in many fictional publications. These are often used as an important element in shaping fictional culture by authors. Military fiction is a key component of the "military and popular culture" subfield.

== See also ==
- Martial music
