= Three-volley salute =

Military funeral rite

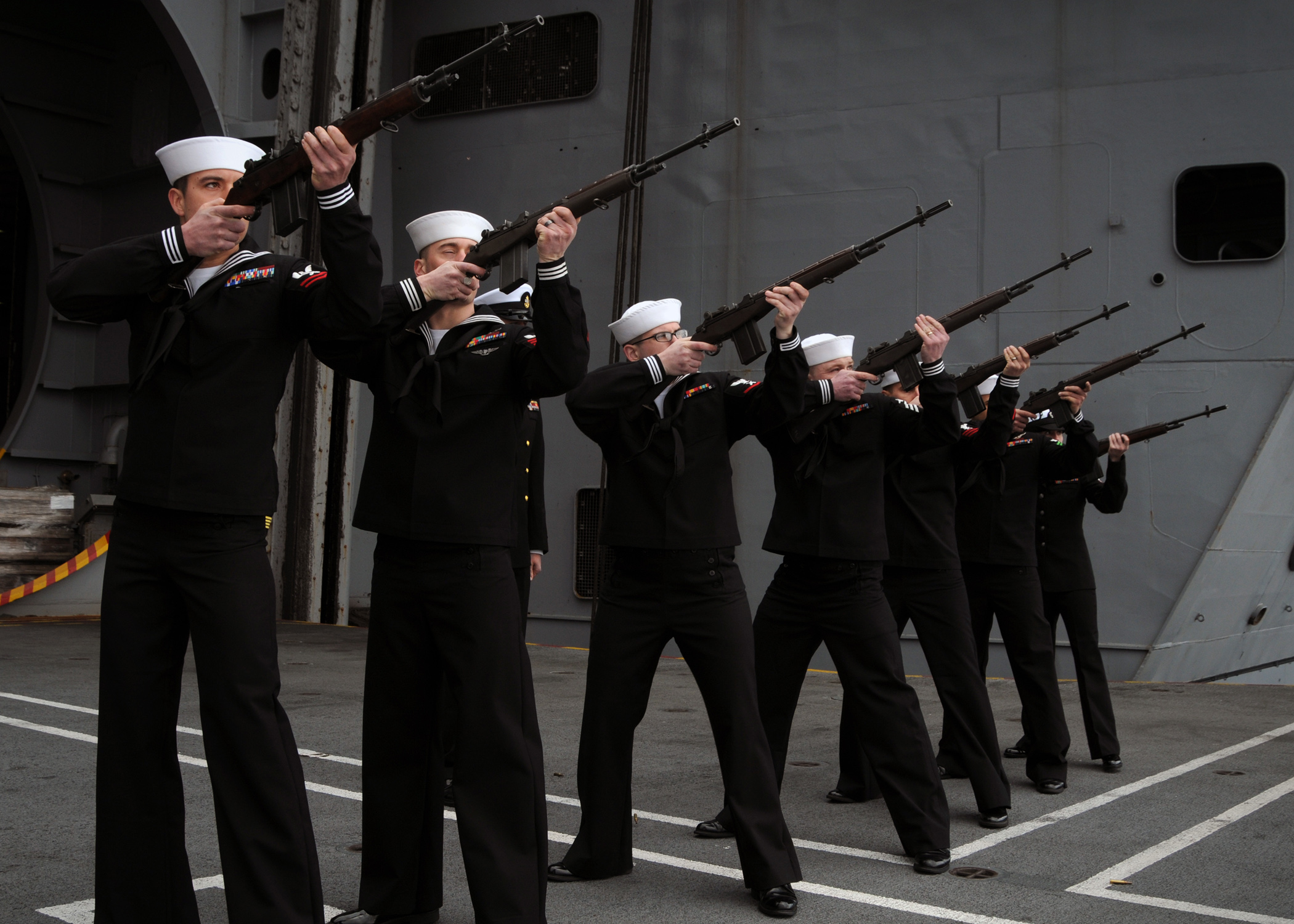
Sailors of the United States Navy, armed with M14s, form a rifle party and fire a volley salute on the deck of the aircraft carrier USS Abraham Lincoln during a burial at sea ceremony.

"Three Volley Salute"
A US Army rifle party firing three volleys

The three-volley salute is a ceremonial act performed at military funerals and sometimes also police funerals, and consists of the firing of three shots at the graveside. According to the U.S. military, the custom likely originates with Roman funeral rites, where earth would be cast on the body three times, and the ceremony was ended by the deceased's name being called three times. It was then customary for the friends and relatives of the deceased to repeat the word 'vale' (meaning farewell or goodbye) three times. In more recent history three volleys were fired to signify the end of a funeral and that the burial detail was to be ready for battle.

It should not be confused with the 21-gun salute (or 19-gun, 17-gun, etc.) which is fired by a battery of artillery pieces.

== United States ==
In the United States it is part of the drill and ceremony of the Honor Guard. It consists of a rifle party firing blank cartridges into the air three times.

A rifle party usually has an odd number of members, from three to seven. The firearm used is typically a rifle, but at some police funerals, shotguns or handguns are used. The party usually stands so that the muzzles are pointed over the casket. However, if mourners are present near the grave, the party stands some distance away (often recommended at least 50 feet) so as to not deafen the attendees and to minimize the disturbance. If the service is being performed indoors, the firing party stands outside the building, often near the front entrance. On the command of the NCO-in-charge, the party raises their weapons and fires three times in unison.

Modern United States military parties use M1, M14 or M16 rifles. The use of blank cartridges means these weapon's semi-automatic gas action will not function, requiring manual cycling of the next round between shots. Some parties equip the rifle with a blank-firing adapter, which eliminates this step from the drill after the first shot, though this is seen by some as less traditional. Similarly, the M1 and M14 are generally preferred over the current issue M16 because the appearance of these older rifles is more traditional and the charging handles are more easily operated in a dignified, ceremonial manner.

== United Kingdom and Commonwealth ==
A similar ceremony is used by the armed forces of the United Kingdom and the Commonwealth.

== Irish Republicans ==
Irish Republicans also fire a three-volley salute at the funerals of IRA and INLA volunteers.

== See also ==
- 21-gun salute
- Ten-bell salute
- Burial at sea
- Change of command
- Color guard
- Half-mast
- Guard of honour
- Military funeral
- Military rites
- Missing man formation
- Riderless horse
- State funeral
- Tomb of the Unknown Soldier
- Feu de joie
