= Military rites =

Funeral honors

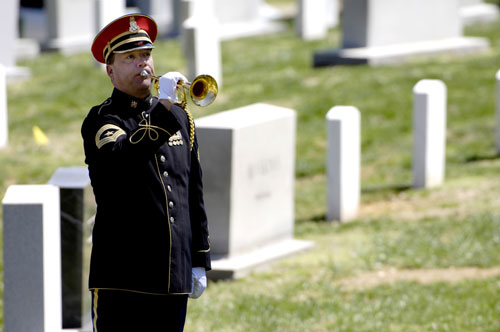
A lone bugler plays Taps during a military funeral held at Arlington National Cemetery for former U.S. Secretary of Defense Caspar W. Weinberger.

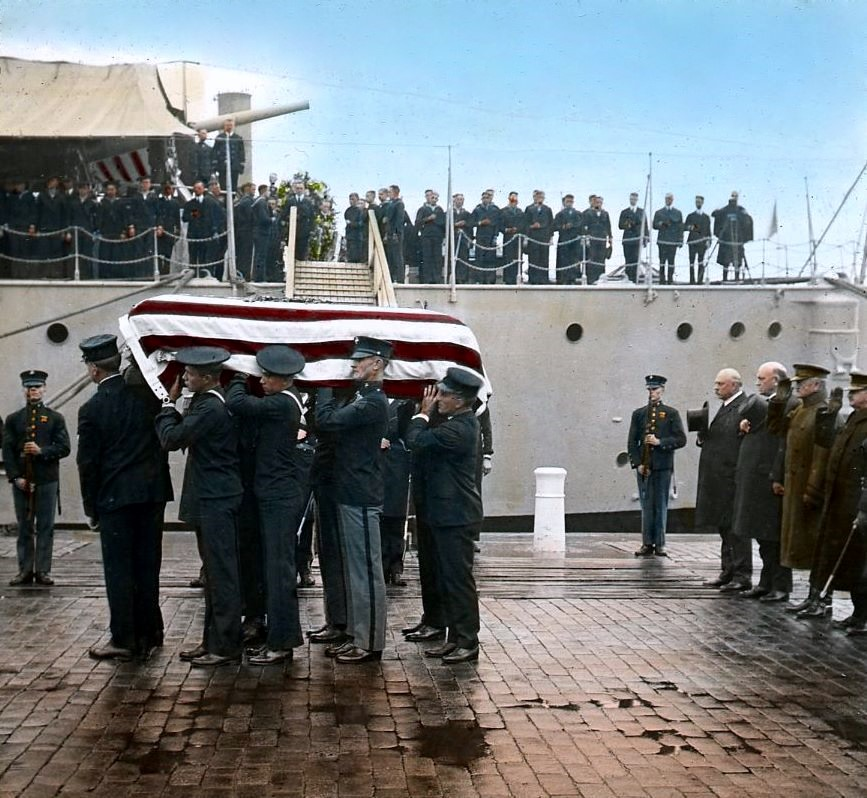
The Unknown Soldier from World War I arriving at the Washington Navy Yard, circa 1921 (colorized)

Military rites are honors presented at a funeral for a member of a military or police force. These rites, which are performed (usually) at the burial, include the firing of rifles, presenting of a flag and or bugle calls. In Australia and New Zealand a Poppy Service is often held for members of the Armed Forces. This includes a short reading by a member of the Returned Services League of Australia or, in New Zealand, the Returned Services Association, the laying of red poppies on the coffin by all present, the playing of the Last Post (or Taps in the United States), Reveille, and recitation of the Ode of Remembrance.

== See also ==
- 3-volley salute
- 21-gun salute
- Burial at sea
- Change of command
- Color guard
- Half-mast
- Honor guard
- Military funeral
- Missing man formation
- Riderless horse
- State funeral
- Tomb of the Unknown Soldier
- United States military music customs
