= Casing of the Colors =

US military ceremony

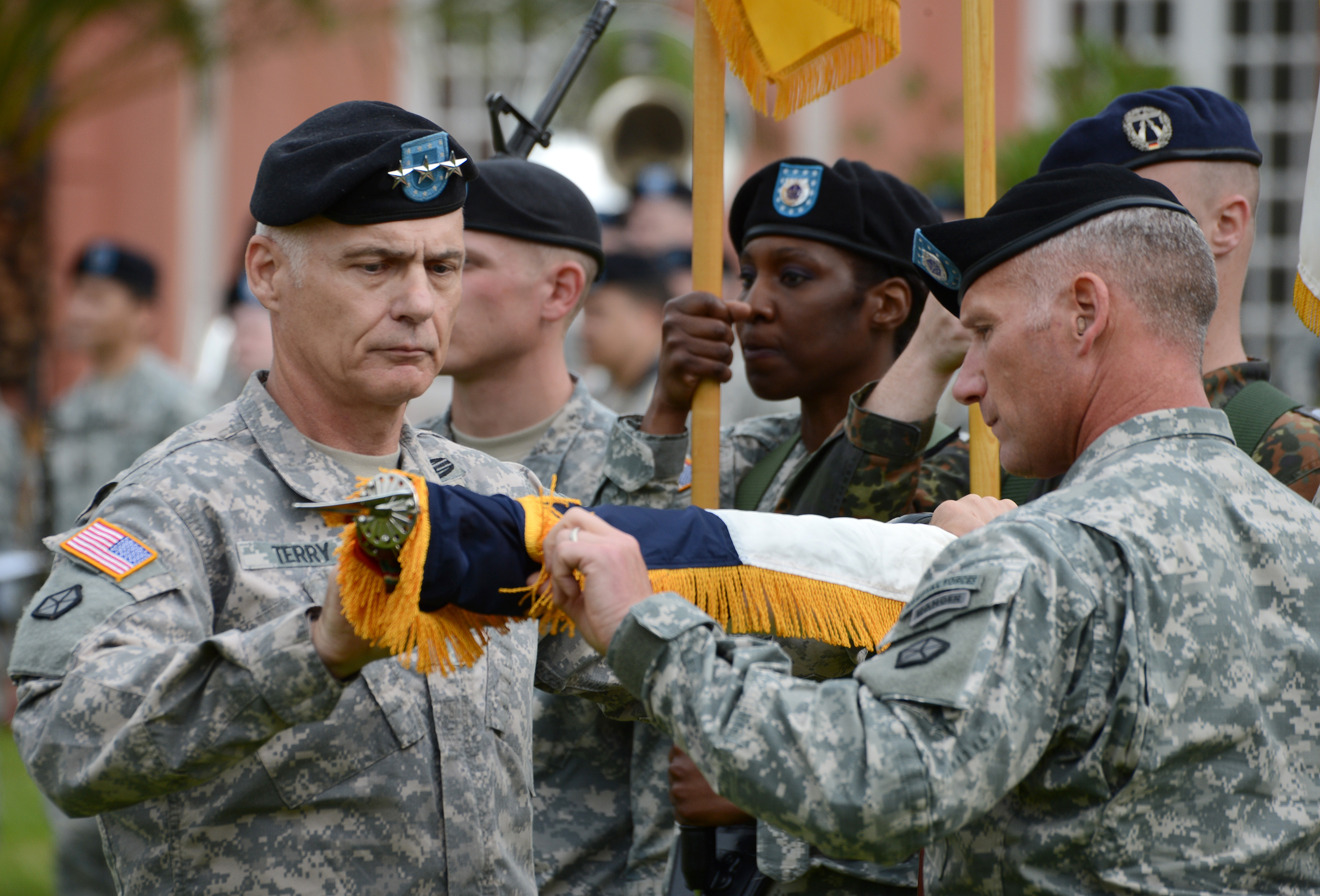
V Corps casing their colors in 2013

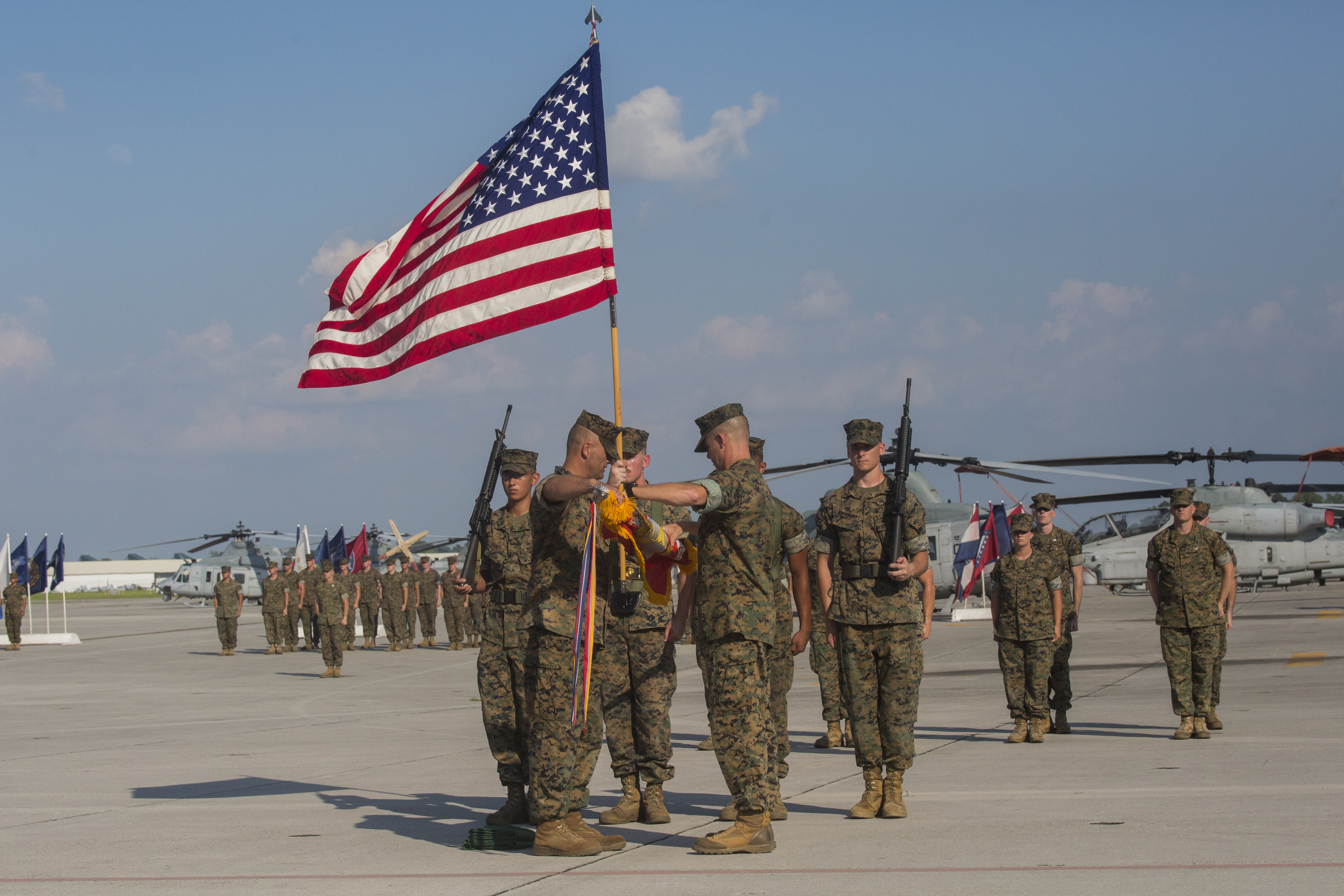
Marine Light Attack Helicopter Squadron 467 casing colors in June 2016

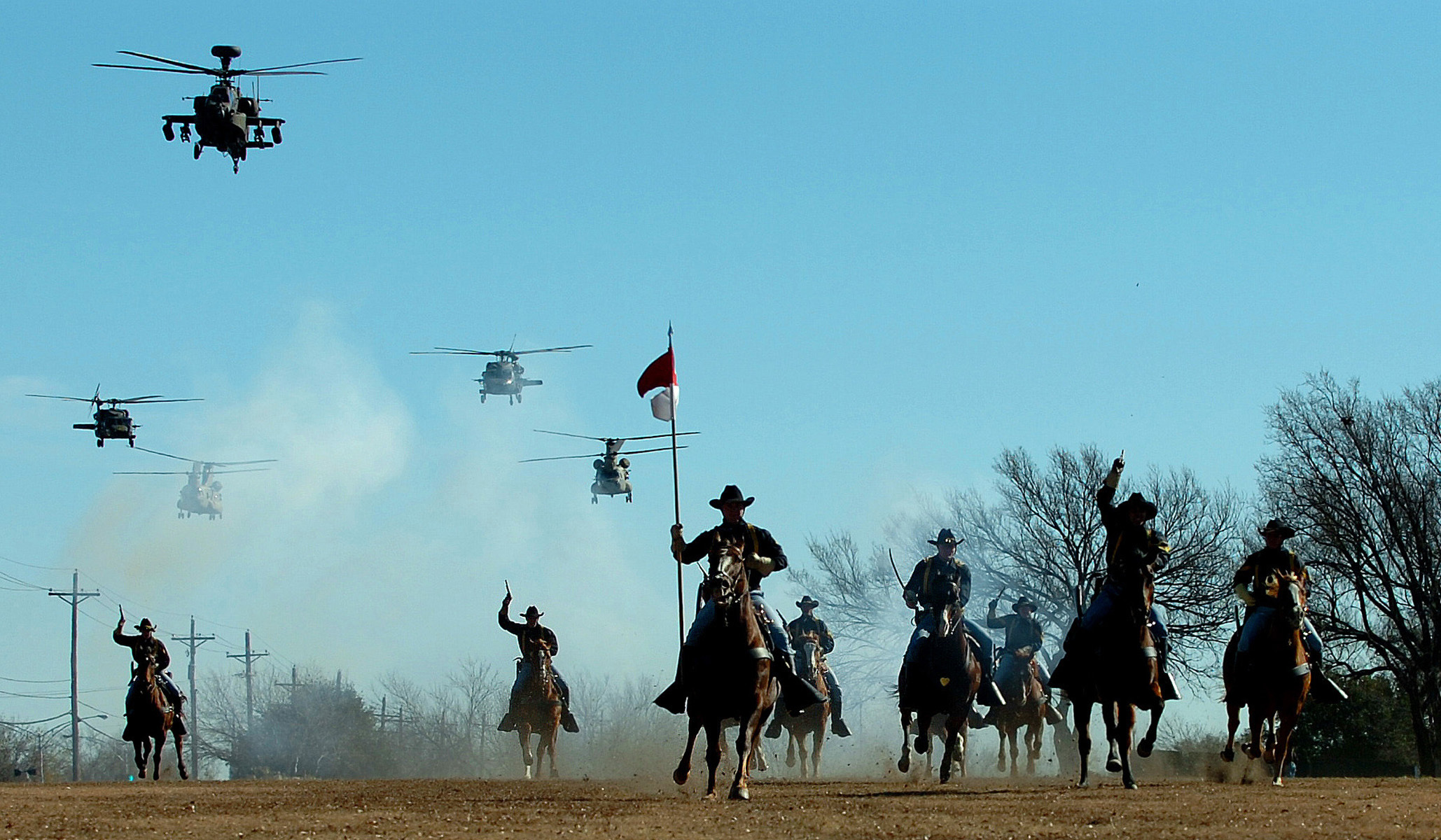
Ceremonial charge by 1st Cavalry Division as part of their casing of colors in 2008

The Casing of the Colors is a traditional ceremony held by United States Army commands, brigades and regiments as well as United States Marine Corps units. Each of these units have unique flags referred to as "colors" which are carried by the color guards to represent the unit at military ceremonies.

If a unit is deactivated, the "Casing of the Colors" ceremony is held to commemorate the unit and its history which is read aloud to the formation. Afterwards, the command's sergeant major then takes the colors from the color bearer's sling, the deactivation order is read and the colors are presented to the unit commander. The unit commander and the sergeant major then proceed to lower and rotate the colors while furling them into a protective sheath thereby casing the colors. The cased colors are presented to the unit's color bearer who then carries them from the field officially ending the unit command. Cased colors for US Army units are then sent to the United States Army Center of Military History in Washington, DC.

== See also ==
- Change of command
- Guidon
- Trooping the Colour
