= United States military music customs =

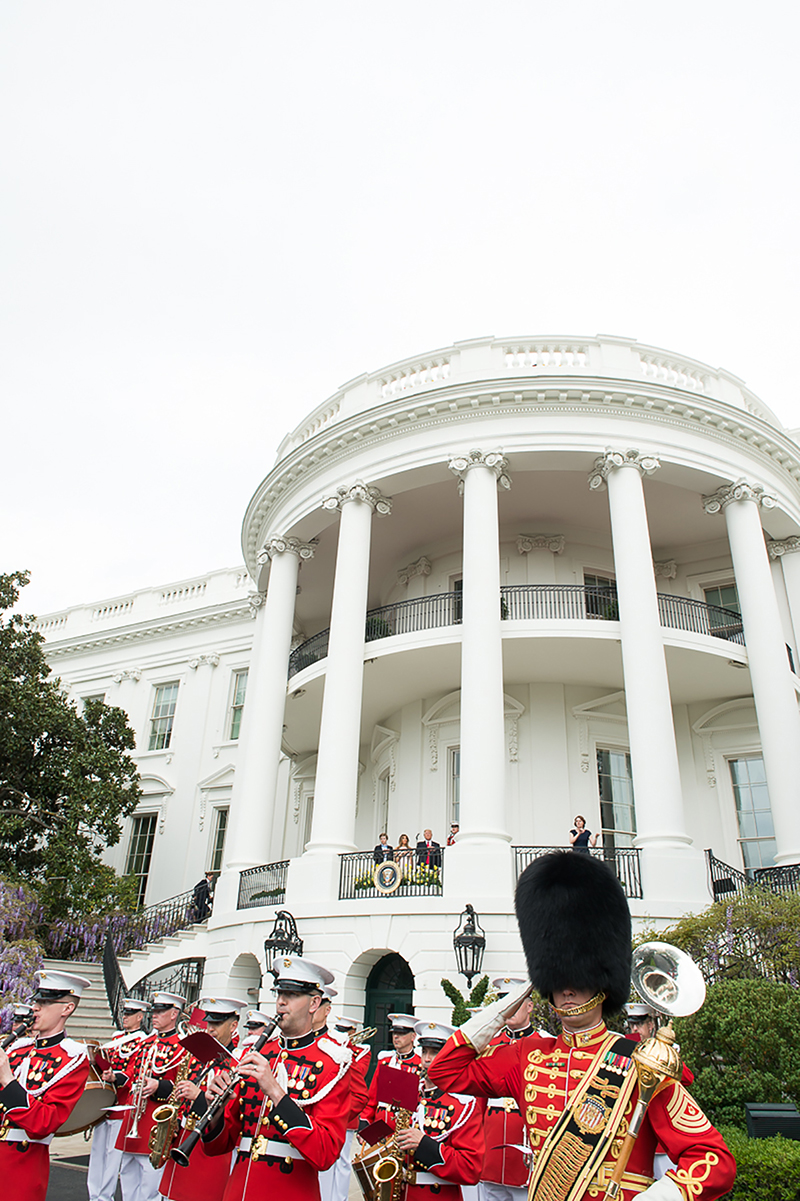

United States military music customs are the traditional, regulatory, and statutory provisions that guide performances by United States military bands during drill and ceremony and state occasions.

== History and evolution ==
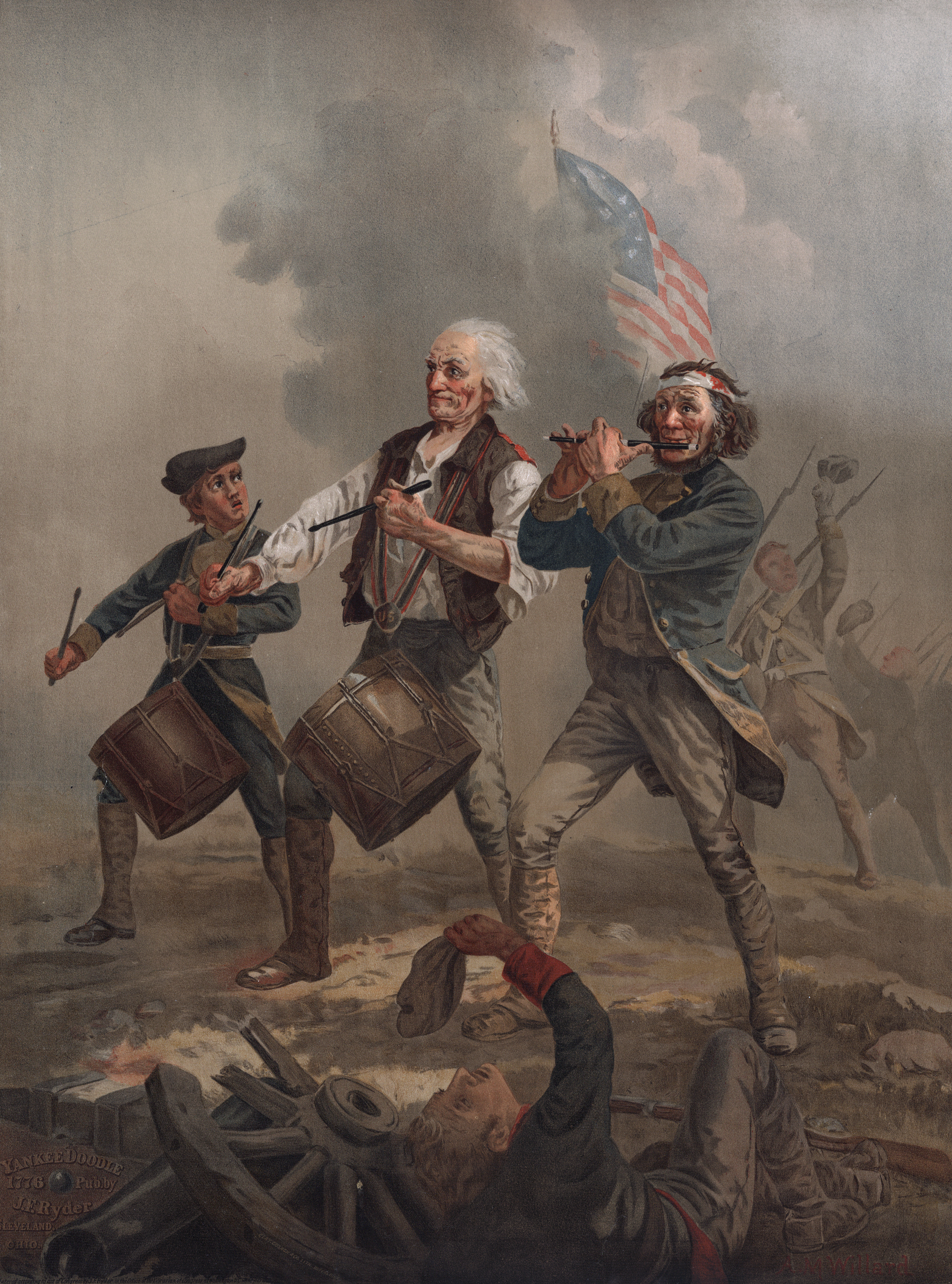
Early U.S. military music was centered around the fife, with brass instruments only slowly adopted.

For hundreds of years, military forces have used music to signal their troops. The use of music retains an important place in modern diplomatic protocol and military courtesy and is part of many official military events, such as state funerals, military parades, naval christening, officer-commissioning ceremonies, and promotion ceremonies.

Unlike other English-speaking nations, United States military band ceremonial music is not largely drawn from British military customs but is, rather, a mix of original styles and compositions and - to a lesser extent - French traditions. At the outset of the American Revolution, United States military units primarily relied on fife and drum corps for musical support. The U.S. was first introduced to the bugle horn (forerunner to the modern bugle) during the Battle of Harlem Heights, when British infantry used the instrument, causing Joseph Reed to later recall, "the enemy appeared in open view, and sounded their bugles in a most insulting manner, as is usual after a fox chase. I never felt such a sensation before—it seemed to crown our disgrace." Some U.S. cavalry units adopted bugle horns during the war, however, a shortage of brass in the Thirteen Colonies largely limited use of the instrument to the opposing British and German forces, with U.S. troops continuing to rely heavily on fifes, drums, and even - at the Battle of Saratoga - turkey calls.

The modern bugle was first introduced to U.S. military units around the time of the War of 1812. During that conflict, only the Rifle Regiment was authorized to use the bugle. All other U.S. forces were required to continue using the traditional U.S. fife. Gradually, however, bugles became more widely adopted by the United States military. U.S. bugle calls have largely been based on early French bugle calls (the notable exception is "Attention", which is taken from the British bugle call "Alarm").

The dawn of the "march music era" hastened the downfall of the fife and drum corps (today, the U.S. armed forces field just a single fife and drum corps among its nearly 150 bands). Aided by the large body of work being created by prolific U.S. composers such as John Philip Sousa, Henry Filmore and Edwin Eugene Bagley, U.S. military and military-like bands became known for performing a unique style of quick-tempo marches with thundering brass and heavy percussion. One music critic, writing about the Boston Jubilee of 1872, contrasted the "velvety smoothness" of the invited Band of the Grenadier Guards to the follow-up performance orchestrated by U.S. Army bandmaster general Patrick Gilmore which involved "a heterogeneous choir of nearly twenty thousand, an orchestra of about a thousand instrumentalists of decidedly mixed abilities, an organ blown by steam power ... a drum of the most preposterous magnitude, and a few batteries of artillery."

== Music regulations ==
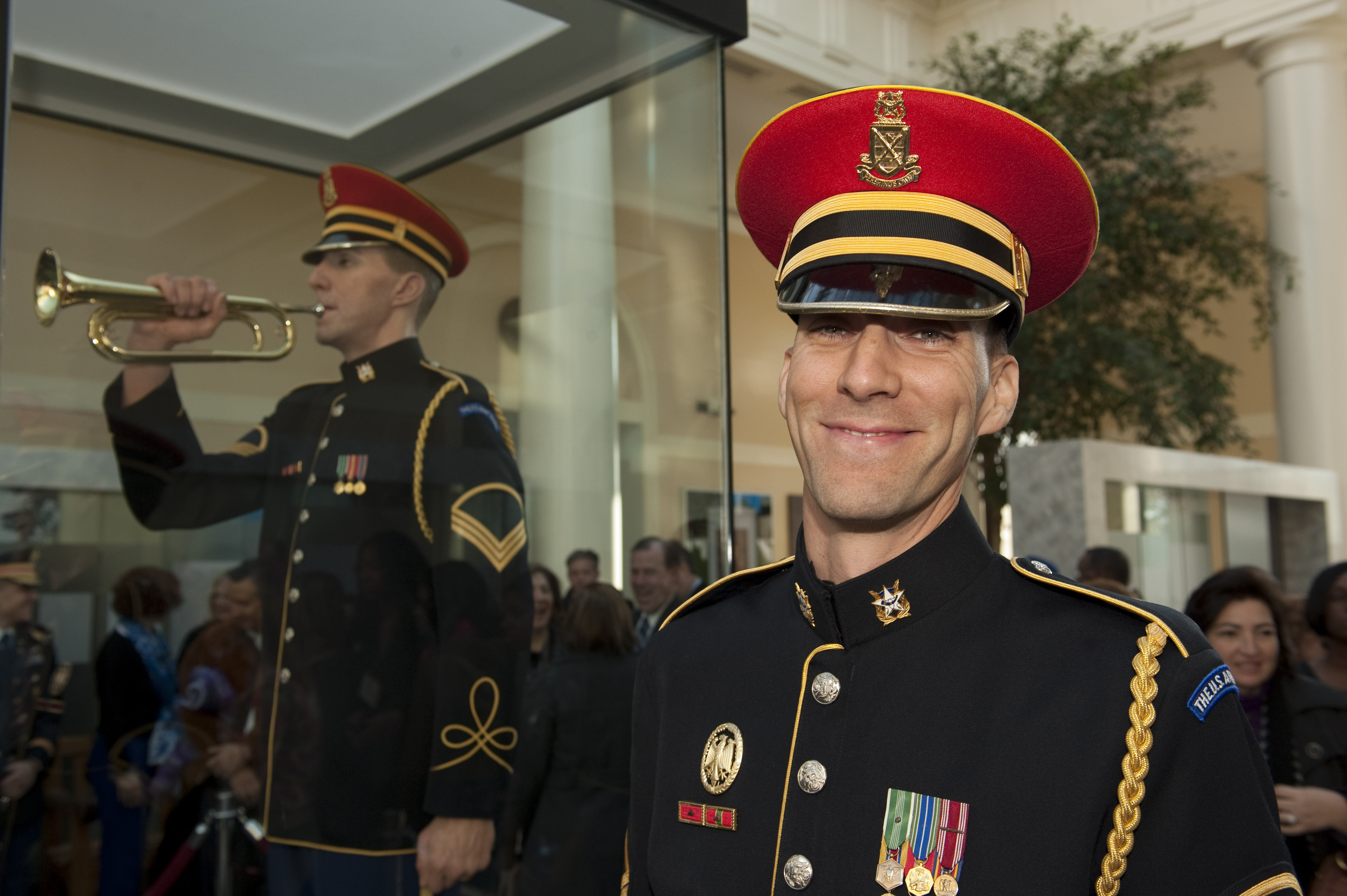
In 2013 a lifelike statue of U.S. Army Band bugler Sgt. Jesse Tubb playing "Taps" was unveiled in the visitors' center of Arlington National Cemetery.

Today, United States military bands employ music at various times as provided for in armed forces regulations, statute law, and customary practice.

=== Bugle calls and drum cadences ===
- A single bugler performing "Taps" is traditionally used to give graveside honors to the deceased (the U.S. Army specifically prohibits the use of "Echo Taps"). Title 10 of the United States Code establishes that funerals for veterans of the U.S. military shall "at a minimum, perform at the funeral a ceremony that includes the folding of a United States flag and presentation of the flag to the veteran’s family and the playing of 'Taps'."
- The bugle calls "Reveille" and "Retreat" are used to mark sunrise and sunset at military installations, respectively. "Reveille" and "Retreat" are used as guides for the performance of non-musical honors, as well. For instance, the U.S. Army requires that, the day following the death of a former President of the United States, every Army post must fire artillery "every half-hour, beginning at reveille and ending at retreat."
- United States drum cadences are performed at a fast 120 beats per minute. Funeral cadences are performed at 112 beats per minutes.
- When a full band is not available but a single bugler is, "To the Color" is used in place of the U.S. national anthem "The Star-Spangled Banner" when saluting the United States flag.

=== Funeral honors ===
- At remembrance services—which are held to honor a unit or other group of military personnel (as opposed to funerals or memorial services, used to honor individuals)—bands play the "Battle Hymn of the Republic" immediately following the homily.
- The various branches of the U.S. armed forces prescribe specific hymns to be played at funerals. U.S. Air Force regulations direct that "Faith of Our Fathers" be performed at Roman Catholic burials and "Amazing Grace" at Protestant ceremonies.

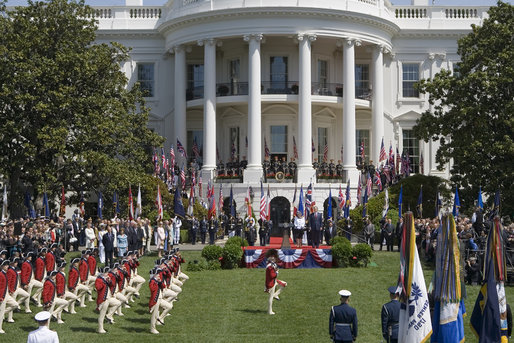
the fife and drum corps of the 3rd Infantry Regiment passes in review during a state arrival at the White House

=== Military ceremonies ===
- The trio section from "National Emblem" is performed to advance the colors. This may be replaced by "You're a Grand Old Flag" in certain situations.
- Some U.S. Army units, such as the 1st Infantry Division, have officially recognized unit marches and songs. Army units with attached bands can adopt unit songs at the request of the commanding officer and approval of the United States Army Center of Military History. Other units with official songs include the 7th Infantry Division (whose slow-tempoed march, "Arirang", was a gift from the Republic of Korea), and the 3rd Armored Division ("The Spearhead Song").

=== Personal salutes ===
- Bands perform ruffles and flourishes prior to the entrance march of a dignitary. Four ruffles and flourishes are authorized for the President and Vice President of the United States, governors, and four-star generals and admirals, and, presumably the extinct field marshal-equivalent rank of General of the Army and the generalissimo rank of General of the Armies of the United States. Three ruffles and flourishes are offered to lieutenant generals and vice admirals, and so forth, down to a single ruffle and flourish for brigadier generals and rear admirals.
- Following ruffles and flourishes a pause is observed to allow the announcement of the dignitary. The appropriate entrance march is then performed: "Hail to the Chief" (the President of the United States), "Hail Columbia" (the Vice President), the "General's March" (Army and Air Force generals), or the "Flag Officer's March" (admirals). The last 32 bars of "Stars and Stripes Forever" are performed as a generic entrance march for civilian officials below the rank of Vice President. If the official is a foreign dignitary, the last 16 bars of "Hands Across the Sea" is used instead.
- Foreign heads of state and chiefs of government arriving at the White House are welcomed with the fanfare "Call to Statesmanship". At the conclusion of a state arrival ceremony, the President returns to the White House—generally entering either via the Blue Room or the Diplomatic Reception Room—to the fanfare "Presidential Processional".

== Uniforms and heraldry ==
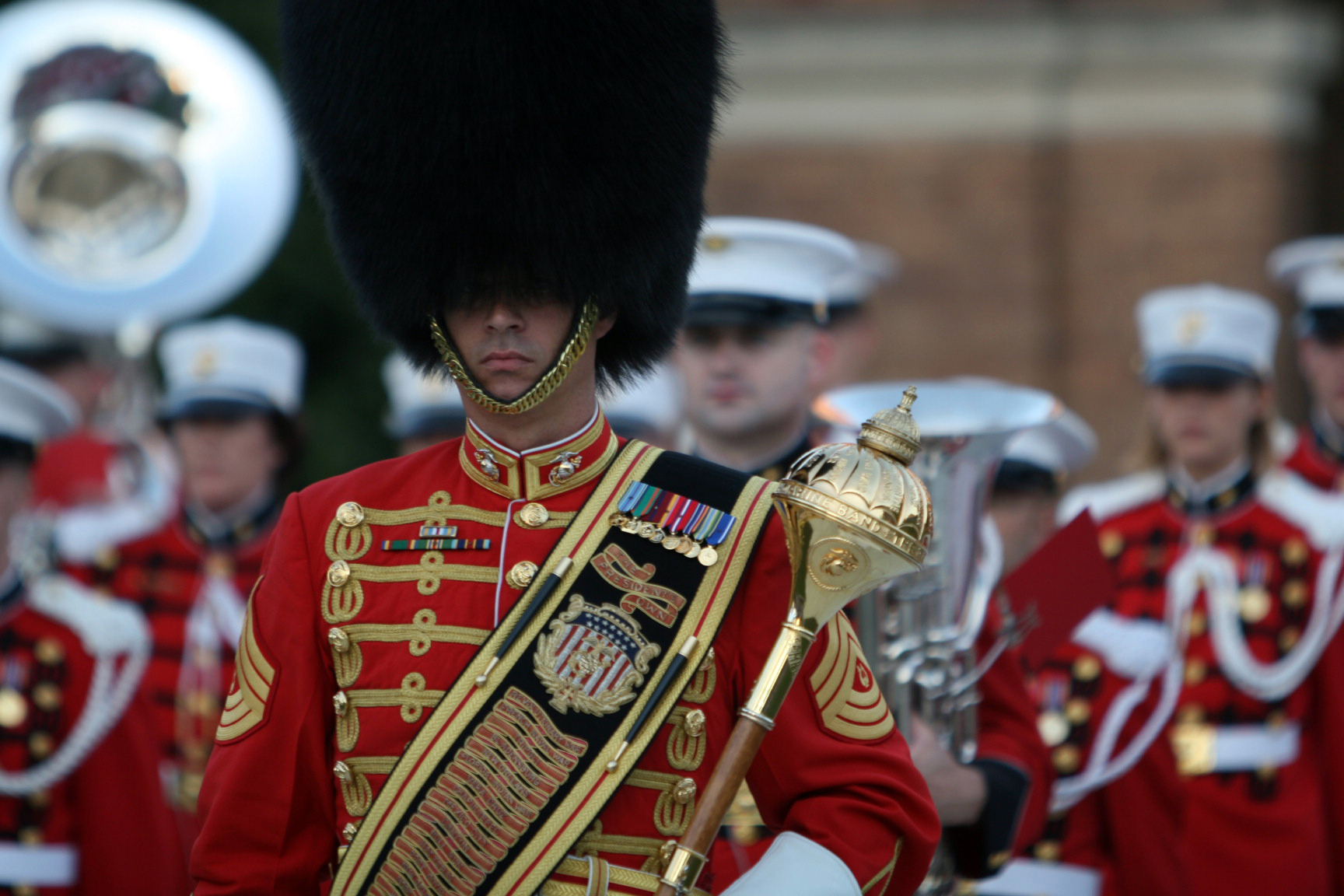
U.S. Marine Band drum major in bearskin hat and ceremonial baldric

The United States authorizes all military bands "band regalia" consisting of a unique unit drum major mace, baldric, tabard, and drum design. The United States Army Institute of Heraldry designs these items on behalf of military bands.

In full parade dress, drum majors of many U.S. military bands wear bearskin hats. The origin of the use of bearskins in U.S. military bands dates to 1855 when United States Marine Band director Francis Scala adopted the style for that ensemble in emulation of European trends. This transition occurred as the band was reorganizing itself from a traditional U.S. fife and drum corps into its modern incarnation. A shortage of bearskins in the late 1880s caused the price of the hats to skyrocket, with The New York Times then reporting their use might be phased out entirely. "It can readily be seen what a price has to be paid for keeping up a custom which is rather old, it is true, but is practically a useless one save for the purpose of military display," the newspaper opined.

== Audio examples ==
the trio section from "National Emblem", used to post the colors	"Hail to the Chief", preceded by four ruffles and flourishes	"Presidential Processional" is used to announce the departure of the president

== See also ==
- American march music
- Military rites
- United States military bands
