= Change of command =

Military tradition representing transfer of authority

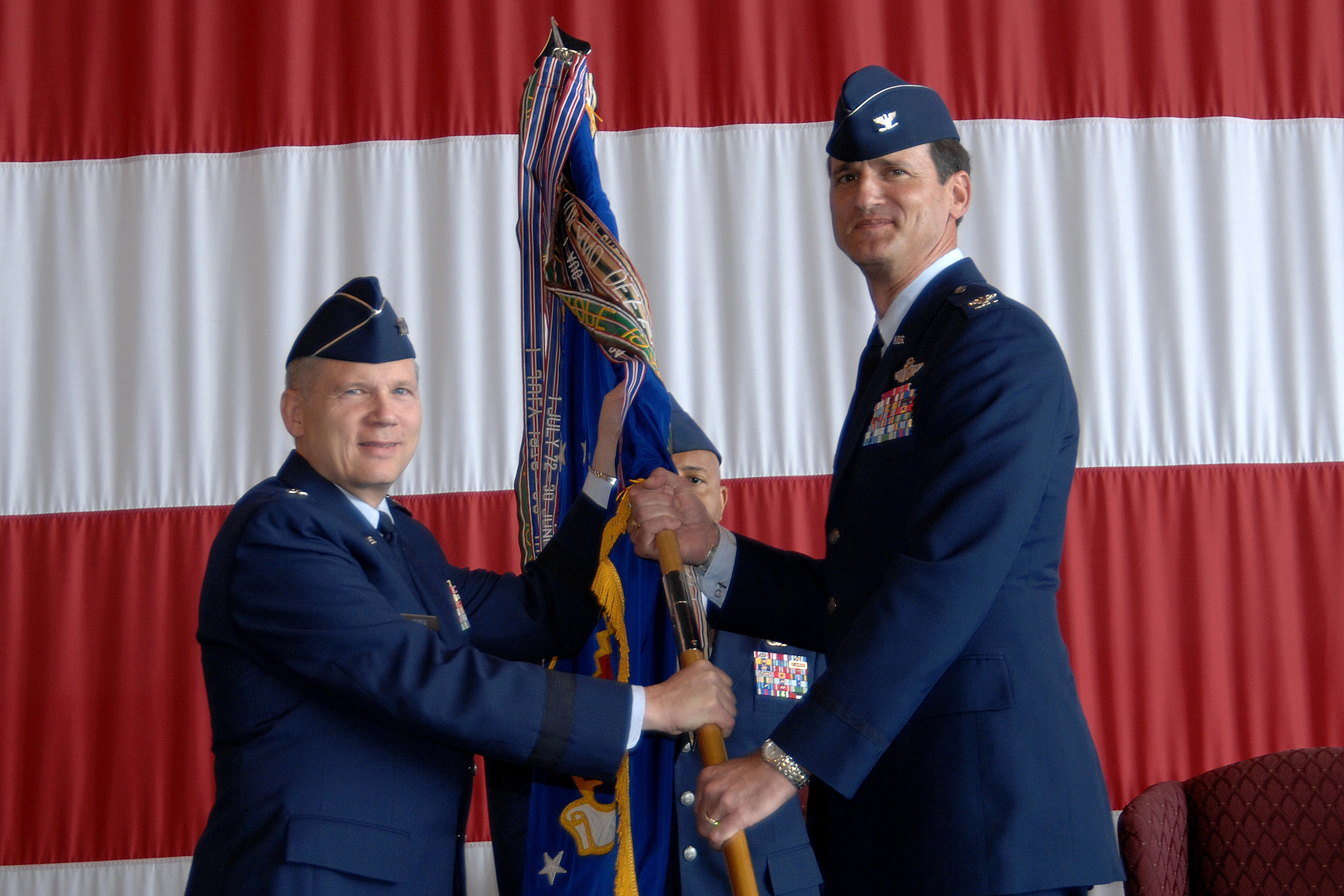
Col. Jim Jones (right) accepts the 55th Wing’s guidon from Eighth Air Force Commander Lt. Gen. Robert J. Elder Jr. (left) during a wing change of command ceremony at Offutt Air Force Base, Nebraska, USA.

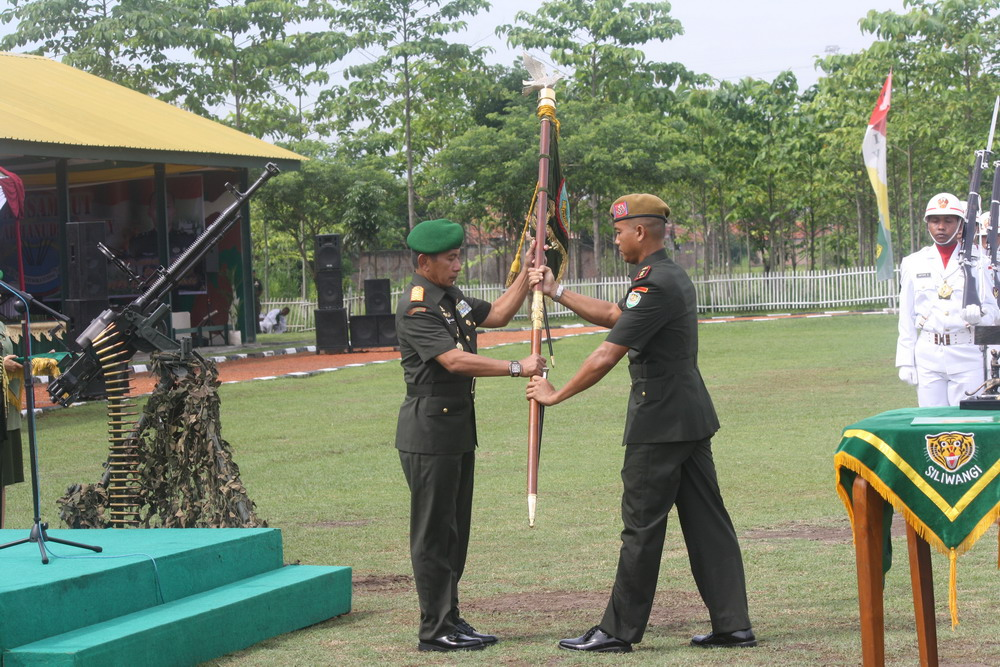
An Indonesian Army Change of command ceremony from Lt. Col Tri Sugiyanto to Major Sudrajat of the 14th Medium Air Defense Artillery Battalion, Kodam III/Siliwangi, Cirebon

A change of command is a military tradition that represents a formal transfer of authority and responsibility for a unit from one commanding or flag officer to another. The passing of colors, standards, or ensigns from an outgoing commander to an incoming one ensures that the unit and its soldiers is never without official leadership, a continuation of trust, and also signifies an allegiance of soldiers to their unit's commander.

Great symbolism is attached to the ceremonial aspects of a change of command. An inspection and review of soldiers, gun salutes, as well as a military band will often be incorporated into the ceremony. On the International Space Station, the new and old commanders ring a bell.

For a Command Sergeant Major, the transferred item might be a saber during a Change of Responsibility, while for a Chaplain, the item might be the passing of a Clerical Stole.

== See also ==
- 3-volley salute
- 21-gun salute
- Burial at sea
- Casing of the Colors
- Color guard
- Half-staff
- Honor guard
- Military funeral
- Military rites
- Missing man formation
- Riderless horse
- State funeral
- Tomb of the Unknown Soldier
