= To the Color =

US military bugle call

To the Colors
"To the Colors" played on a bugle by a member of the United States Army Band

"To the Colors" is a bugle call honoring the United States used when there is no band present, when the national anthem ("The Star-Spangled Banner") cannot be played, or when the national anthem has been played already but honor is to be rendered again.

The United States Armed Forces requires the same courtesies to "To the Colors" as to the national anthem.

"To the Colors" is named and employed differently between branches of the US military.

In the United States Army, "To the Colors" is sounded at the moment the flag begins to be lowered in the evening, and is immediately preceded by "Retreat" which marks the end of the working day.

In the United States Navy, "Morning Colors" (the same call as "To the Colors") is sounded the moment the flag is raised in the morning.

In Scouting America (formerly the Boy Scouts of America), "To the Colors" is recommended for both raising and lowering the flag (preceded by "Retreat" in the evening as per US Army protocol). The organization offers a Bugling Merit Badge, requiring a Scout to properly sound a choice of ten of fifteen named bugle calls, of which "To the Colors" is one.

== See also ==
- United States military music customs
