= Colour guard =

Type of military unit

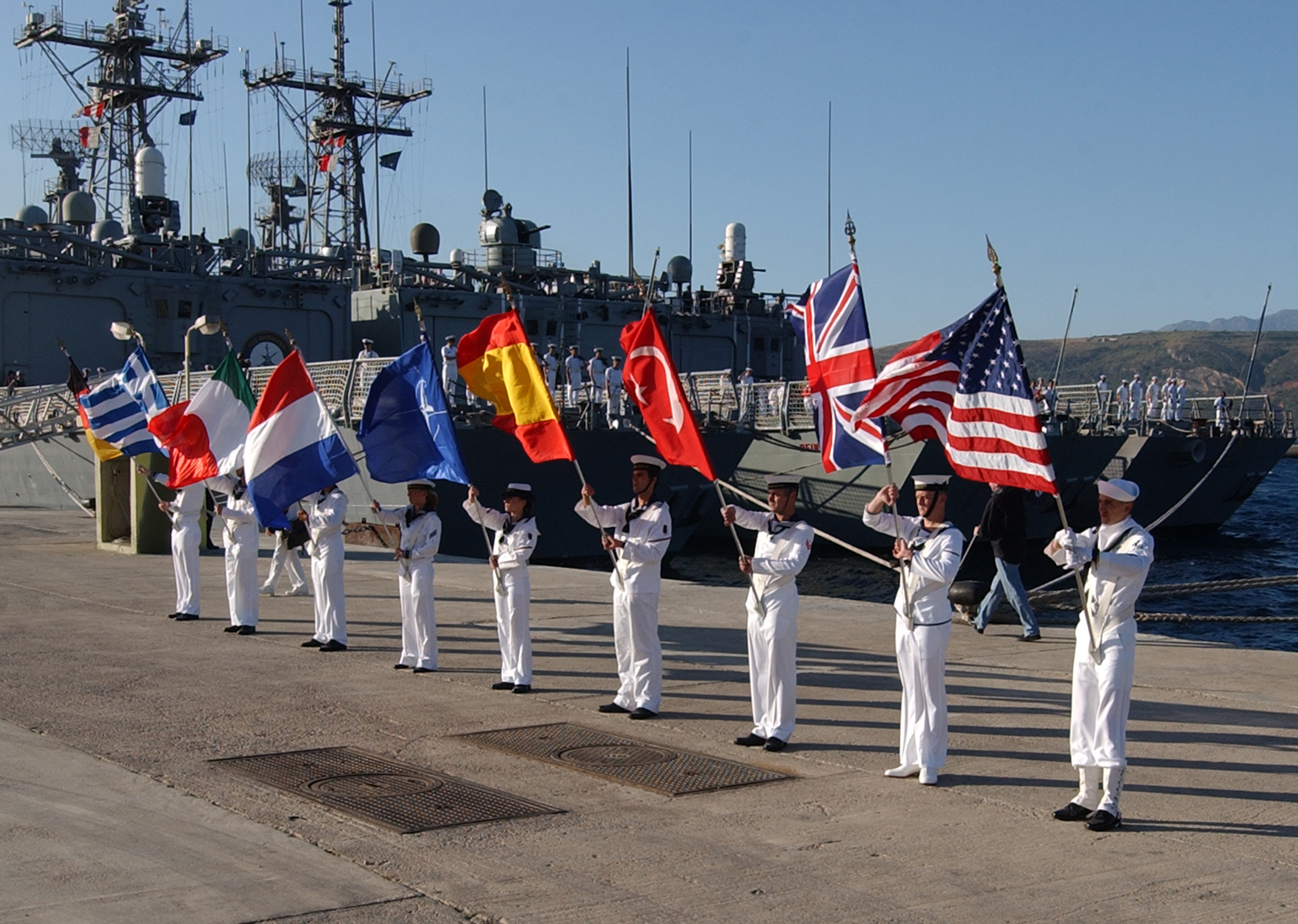
A colour guard detachment during the opening ceremony for the North Atlantic Council and Military Committee SEA Day Exercise.

In military organizations, a colour guard (or color guard) is a detachment of soldiers assigned to the protection of regimental colours and the national flag. This duty is highly prestigious, and the military colour is generally carried by a young officer (ensign), while experienced non-commissioned officers (colour sergeants) are assigned to the protection of the national flag. These non-commissioned officers, accompanied in several countries by warrant officers, can be ceremonially armed with either sabres or rifles to protect the colour. Colour guards are generally dismounted, but there are also mounted colour guard formations as well.

== History ==
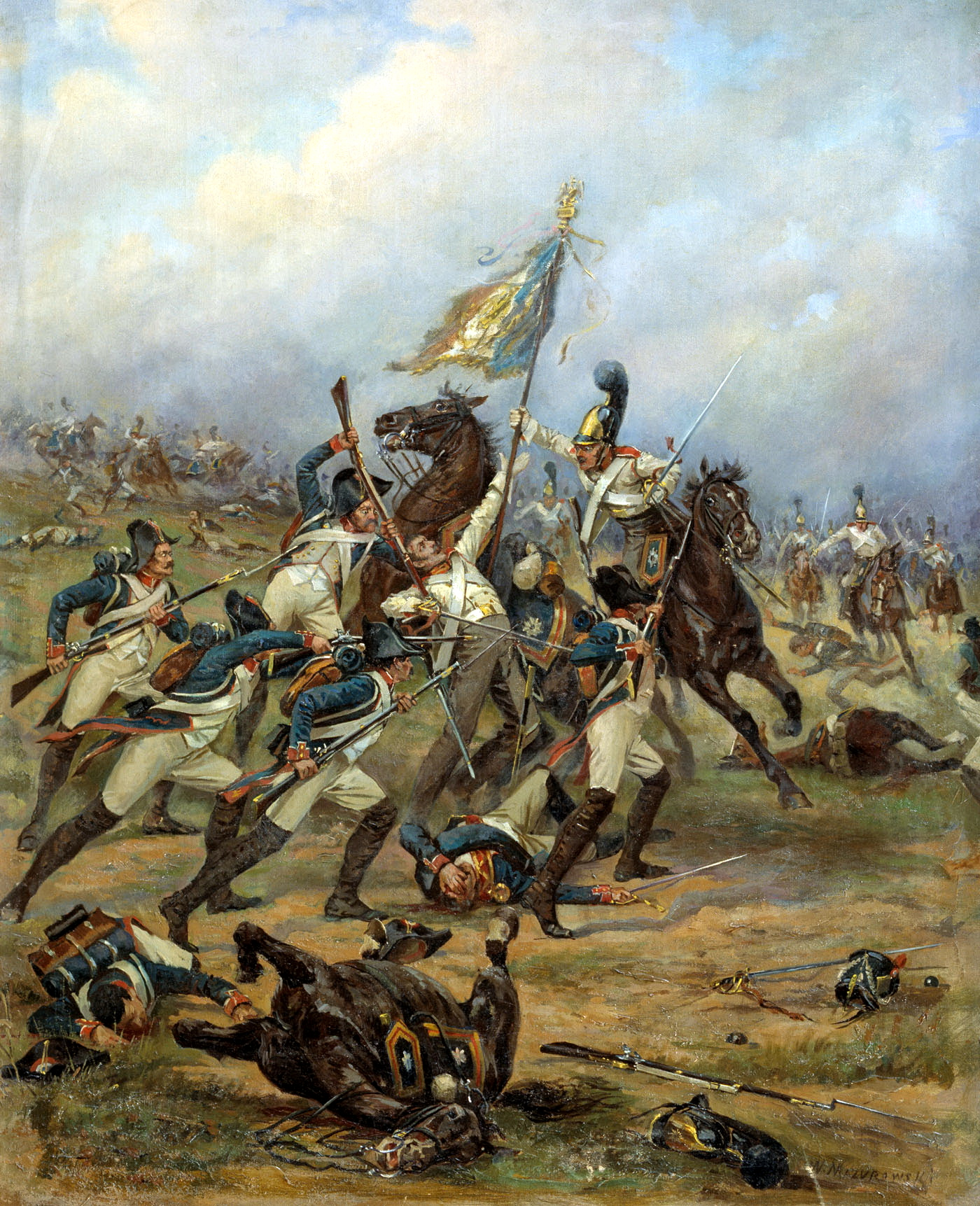
Fight for the flag between French line infantry and Russian Guard cuirassiers at the battle of Austerlitz (1805).

As long as armies existed there was a need for soldiers to know where their comrades were. A solution to this problem was the carrying of colourful banners or other insignia. Such flags or banners either showed a personal symbol of the leader of said units or a symbol for the "state" they represented.

Such banners or flags also came to represent a units identity and history. They were therefore treated with reverence as they represented the honour and traditions of the regiment. The loss of a unit's flag was shameful, and losing that central point of reference could also make the unit break up. Therefore, regiments tended to adopt colour guards, a detachment of experienced or élite soldiers, to protect their colours. As a result, the capture of an enemy's standard was considered as a great feat of arms.

Regimental flags were sometimes awarded to a regiment by a head of state during a ceremony, which was considered a high honour usually reserved for elite units, and colours may be inscribed with battle honours or other symbols representing former achievements.

Due to the advent of modern weapons, and subsequent changes in tactics, colours are no longer used in battle but continue to be carried by colour guards at events of formal character.

== By country ==
=== Argentina ===
In the Argentinean Armed Forces, the Colour Guard is composed by a junior officer (normally the most junior in the unit) carrying the colours, accompanied by two senior NCOs with rifles or sabres, who provide the escort. The group is followed by a senior NCO carrying the regimental standard, with two junior NCOs (sometimes, privates) as escorts. In academies and schools, the colours are carried by the student of the senior class with the highest marks, escorted by the two who follow him.

In cavalry formations the escort NCOs and the ensign are all mounted on horseback, and the escorts carry sabres.

=== People's Republic of China ===
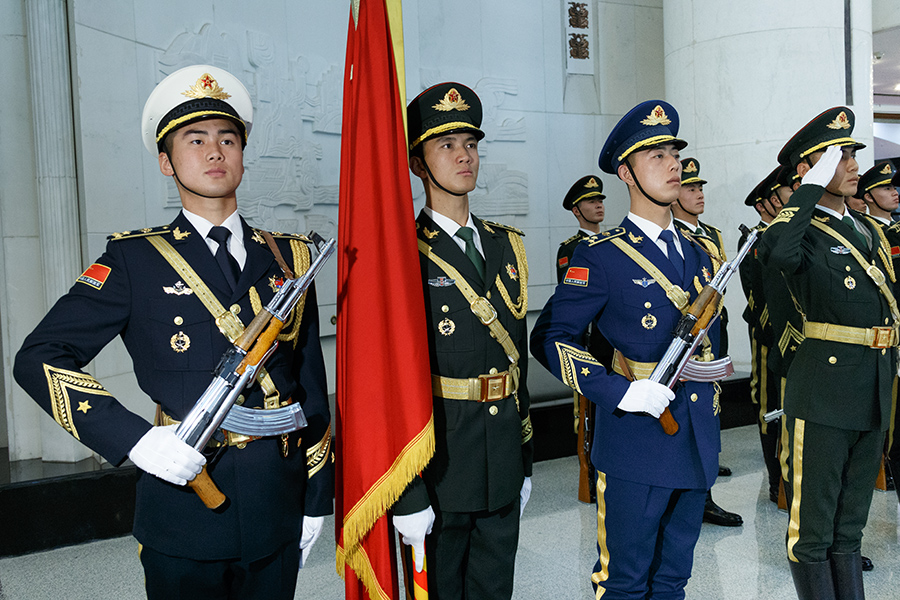
Colour guard of the Chinese People's Liberation Army.

In the Chinese People's Liberation Army, the colour guards include one ensign holding the flag of the People's Liberation Army as the national colour domestically or the flag of China when abroad, and two officers or senior NCOs assisting the ensign holding rifles.

In the parades of the 1950s, this configuration was present in every unit of the PLA up to the parade of 1959, but with the ensign and escorts drawn from individual formations. Today, only honour guards are granted colour guard duty to represent the whole of the PLA. Being the senior-most branch of the PLA, the Ground Forces representative serves as the ensign in the service colour guard, with the officer to his/her right being from the Navy and the officer to their left being from the Air Force. Since 1981, the PLA has continued a tradition of the colour guard detail with the PLA flag leading the Beijing Garrison Honor Guard Battalion in military parades. In December 2017, the Beijing Garrison Colour Guard Company of the People's Armed Police, which is present during flag ceremonies in Tiananmen Square in Beijing carrying the national flag, was officially replaced by a new unit that is a part of the honour guard battalion and wears the general PLA full dress. Its colour guard squad follows the same format as the guard of honor colour guard squad.

=== Taiwan (Republic of China) ===
In Taiwan, the colour guard tradition of the Republic of China Armed Forces is modeled on the German, Russian and US practice. Until 1976, each military unit sported a singular stand of colours on parade, as opposed to the honour guard of the ROCAF, which is more aligned with the traditions of the US Joint Service Honour Guard of the Joint Force Headquarters National Capital Region. All colour bearers of formations above company level must be, following US tradition, holding the rank of sergeant or above as a non-commissioned officer, while the colour escorts are lower ranking enlisted personnel. All wear full dress, service dress or battle dress uniforms. Since the National Day parade of 1978, the format of unit colour guards in ROCAF formations of battalion size (and of equivalent formations) is:

- Left escort
- 1st 2 company guidon bearers
- Unit colour
- 2nd 2 company guidon bearers
- Right escort

Brigade-level colours (and above) are guided by the left and right escorts only.

The joint service colour guard of the ROCAF General Headquarters, today as in the past, is similarly composed but is more larger, with its composition being

- Left escort
- Air Force Flag
- Naval Jack
- Army Flag
- Flag of the Republic of China (National Colour)
- Army Honour Guard Unit Colour
- Navy Honour Guard Unit Colour
- Air Force Honour Guard Unit Colour
- Right escort

=== Commonwealth of Nations ===
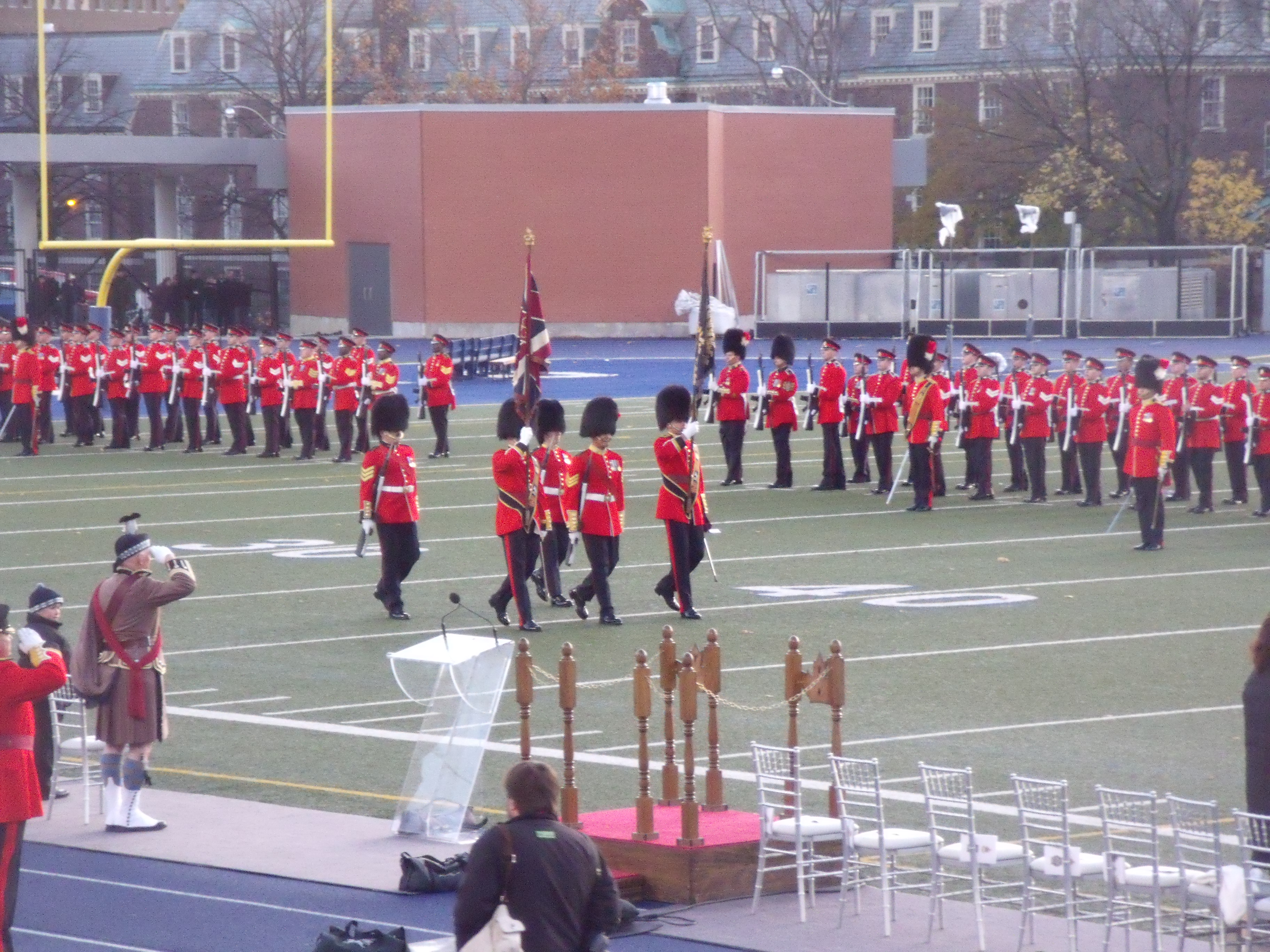
The old colours of the Royal Regiment of Canada are marched off by colour guards, during the presentation of new colours to the regiment.

Colour guards are used in the military throughout the Commonwealth of Nations, including Australia, Canada, Jamaica, New Zealand, and the United Kingdom. A colour guard unit typically consists of the standard-bearer, who is of the rank of second lieutenant or equivalent (pilot officer or sub-lieutenant), positioned in the centre of the colour guard, flanked by two or more individuals, typically armed with rifles or sabres. A colour sergeant major typically stands behind the colours carrying a pace stick. So, the formation (when the colours are combined on parade) is as follows:

- Colour Sergeants carrying rifles
- Ensigns
- Sergeant of the Guard
- Colour Sergeant Major behind the colour

Aside from presenting arms and sabres, colour guards of the Commonwealth of Nations are expected to lower their flags to the ground in full and regular salutes in ceremonies and parades. Civilians should stand during such times and soldiers are expected to salute them when not in formation.

==== United Kingdom ====
As the British Army, the Royal Air Force, the Royal Marines and the Royal Navy have several types of colours, there are also colour guards for these colours and these colours and their colour guards are as follows:

===== British Army (infantry) =====
- King's Colour – Union Flag (Crimson with insignia and the honours for the Guards Division)
  Colour Sergeants and Ensign
- State Colour – Crimson with insignia and the honours and the royal cypher at the corners, used only for the Guards Division in ceremonies in the presence of the monarch
  Colour Sergeants and Ensign
- Regimental colour – Union Flag on the canton with the regimental arms and honours
  - Foot Guards regiments (Union Flag)
  - Royal regiments (navy blue)
  - Royal Irish Regiment (green)
  - other regimental colours
  same as in the King's Colour
- Combined Colour Guards (units)
  Colour Sergeants, Ensign, Guard Sergeant of the Colours, Colour Sergeant Major

===== Royal Air Force =====
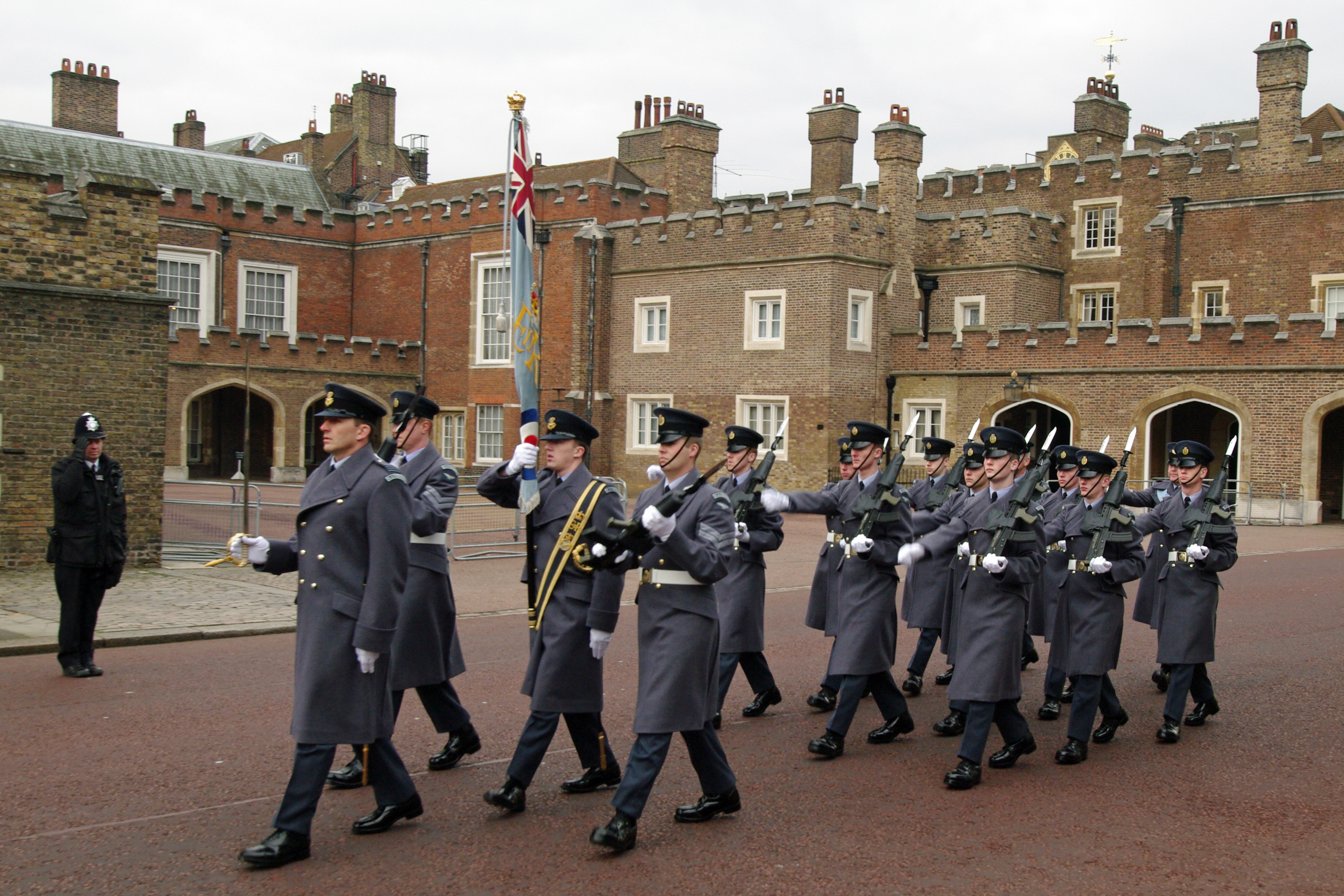
Colour guard for the Royal Air Force.

- King's Colour – Royal Air Force Ensign with the sovereign's cypher and the RAF roundel
  Ensign and armed escorts
- RAF Ensign
  Same as King's Colour
- Squadron Colour – Air force blue with the unit insignia and honours
  same as King's Colour
- Combined Colour Guards (units)
  Colour Sgts., Ensigns, Guard Sergeant of the Colours, CSM

===== British Army (cavalry) =====
In the cavalry, the King's Standard or Guidon and the regimental/squadron standard or guidon (for the light cavalry only) are the equivalents to the King's and regimental colours.

- King's Standard – Crimson with the royal coat of arms, the royal cypher and the regimental honours
  Colour Sergeant/Corporal of Horse, Warrant Officers
- Regimental/squadron standard/guidon – Crimson or scarlet or other colours with the royal cypher, the Union Badge, regimental insignia and honours (only guidons are swallow tailed)
  same as in the King's Standard/Guidon
- Combined Colour Guards (units)
  Colour Corporals/Sergeants, Warrant Officers, Guard Corporal/Sergeant of the Colours, Colours Corporal Major (Household Cavalry), Colours Sergeant Major (other cavalry and armour units)

Colour guards in the artillery units are technically the lead gun's crew and leader (except in the Honourable Artillery Company which uses both guns and colours) and there are no colour guards in the rifle regiments (nowadays The Rifles), the Royal Gurkha Rifles (which use the King's Truncheon) and in the Royal Hospital in Chelsea.

===== Royal Navy =====
All of the RN's King's Colours are identical. Within the RN a colour guard unit consists of:

- King's Colour – White Ensign defaced with the sovereign's cypher and inscribed with honours
  Ensigns and escorts
- White Ensign
  Same as King's Colour
- Combined Colour Guards
  Escorts, Ensigns, Guard Sergeant of the Colours, CSM

====== Royal Marines ======
- King's Colour – Union Jack with the sovereign's cypher and the RM emblem and motto with the "Gibraltar" battle honour
  Ensigns and escorts
- Regimental colour – Union Jack on the canton and dark blue with HM King George IV's cypher and the unit name, and the sovereign's cypher on the other corners
  Ensigns and escorts
- Combined Colour Guards for the RM
  Escorts, Ensigns, Guard Sergeant of the Colours, CSM

=== France ===
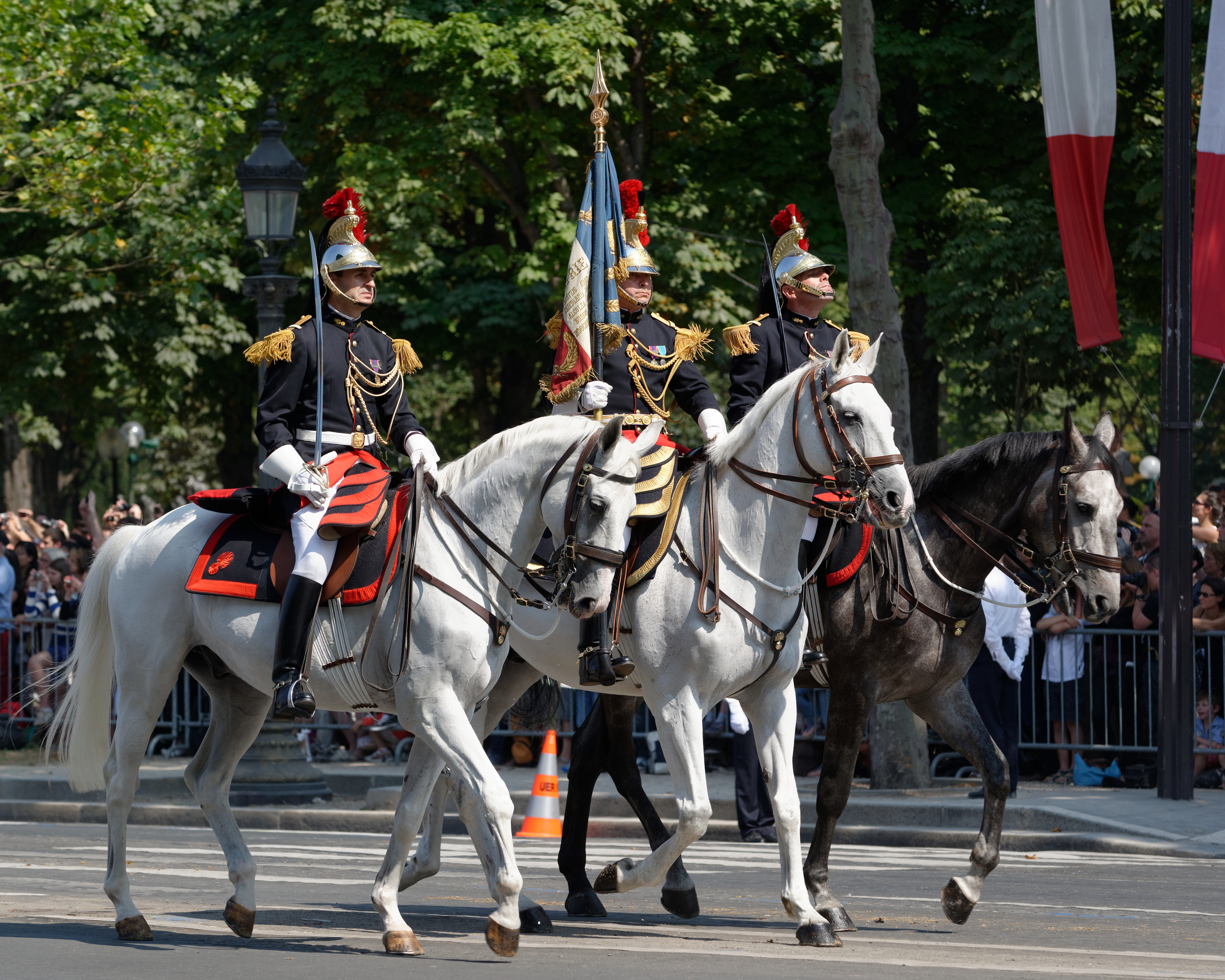
A mounted French colour guard

A French colour guards typically includes one ensign holding the flag of France as the national colour, two non-commissioned officers assisting the ensign, and three enlisted personnel behind to guard the colour.

The colour guards of France's military academies tend to wear swords; those of NCO schools, other educational institutions and active units carry rifles instead. This design is used in other countries with Francophone populations.

French colour guards render honours on the command of present arms (présentez arme). On command, the two NCOs and three enlisted will execute present arms, whether it be by presenting their sabre vertically or by putting the right hand over the handle of their weapon while the ensign lowers the national colour/unit colour somewhere close to their legs. On some occasions, the flag is not lowered unless the guard is in the presence of a dignitary (such as the President of the Republic) or a military leader (such as the Chief of the Defence Staff).

=== Germany ===
Colour guards of the Bundeswehr follow the old German traditions of a three-man colour guard team. A tradition stemming from the days of empire, the colour guard is made up of an ensign, usually a senior NCO (and historically a lieutenant), and two unarmed escorts.

=== Indonesia ===
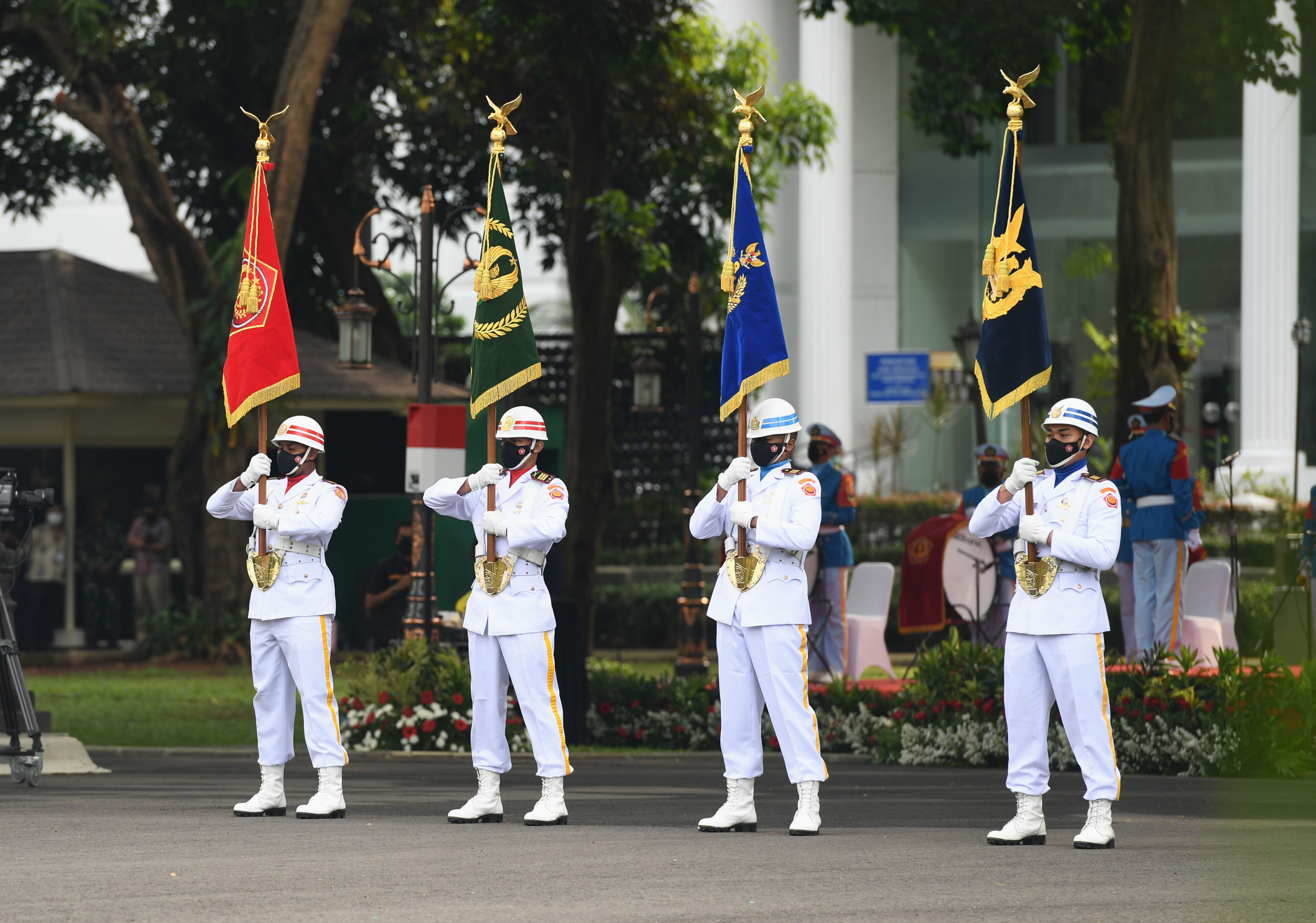
Indonesian National Armed Forces colour guards

In Indonesia, the colour guard is known as "Pataka" an abbreviation from the Indonesian term Pasukan Tanda Kehormatan which is the term used in various uniformed institutions including the Indonesian National Armed Forces (TNI), the Indonesian National Police (Polri), the Municipal Police units, etc. The Pataka consists of white-uniformed 9 to 12 guardsmen which are present during ceremonial events carrying and escorting the Colour of the institution. The Pataka are modeled from the former Dutch practice and is led by a colour sergeant positioned at the middle of the guard (rear of the ensign), while the ensign who carries the colour is usually a junior lieutenant (2nd Lieutenant or Ensign). For a battalion level, the colour is carried by a Sergeant/chief petty officer. In the case of a massed colour guard, the Ensign (1st Lieutenant/Lieutenant (junior grade) rank leads the formation. In the Army, the Horse Cavalry Detachment (Detasemen Kavaleri Berkuda) maintains a mounted colour guard unit.

==== Composition ====
- Colour officer
- Lead squad carrying the unit colour or national flag
  - One colour sergeant/ensign
  - Two non-commissioned officers escorting the colour
- Relief squad
  - One replacement colour sergeant/ensign
  - Two non-commissioned officers
- Rear guard squad of three enlisted personnel (two squads of 3–4 in the Indonesian Marine Corps)

The uniform of the colour guard in Indonesia is all-white, wearing a white ceremonial combat helmet similar to the M1 helmet, white full dress uniforms, white leather flag carrier worn by the ensign, and white parade boots. The colour guard from the military or police usually carries the Lee–Enfield or M1 Garand rifle, but sometimes the M16, FN FAL or Pindad SS1 rifle is used.

=== Mexico ===
In Mexico, an Escolta de la bandera or Escolta is used to describe colour guards and flag parties in the Spanish language. In Mexico these formations are made up of six individuals: the flag party commander and the escort proper of around 5, following the French practice. In the Mexican Armed Forces, National Guard and state police formations the colour escort squad is made up of:

- Ensign carrying the Flag of Mexico as National Colour (Infantry and other units)/National Standard (Cavalry and Artillery (the latter in the Army only))
- Two escorts
- Rear section of two escorts

In Mexican schools, during flag ceremonies—or as known in Mexico juramentos a la bandera or honores a la bandera—the school's colour guard march around the schoolyard while the rest of the students and school staff sing the national anthem; once they finish, the pledge of allegiance is recited, even though it's not mandated by law to do so, and finally the colour guard march off.

Normally, the honour of being part of such colour guards—or as known in Mexico escoltas—is bestowed upon disciplined students with high grades in the latest school year (6th grade in elementary schools, 9th grade in middle schools, and 12th grade in high schools). Sometimes, though, students from lower years or with lower grades may be chosen. Some schools only employ female students.

The layout consists of the flag-bearer flanked by two escorts—the right and the left escort—on the rear there are two rearguards and finally to the right escort's right is the commander. Normally the shortest members happen to be the rearguards. They wear their school dress or athletic uniform.

=== Netherlands ===
The Dutch armed forces have similar ranks corresponding to a colour guard, the vaandrig and kornet (aspirant officers who have not been sworn in yet). The colour guard practice mirrors that of the United Kingdom, with an ensign of second lieutenant rank (or equivalent), armed escorts, and a colour guard commander. All wear full dress uniform as a general rule.

=== Post-Soviet states ===
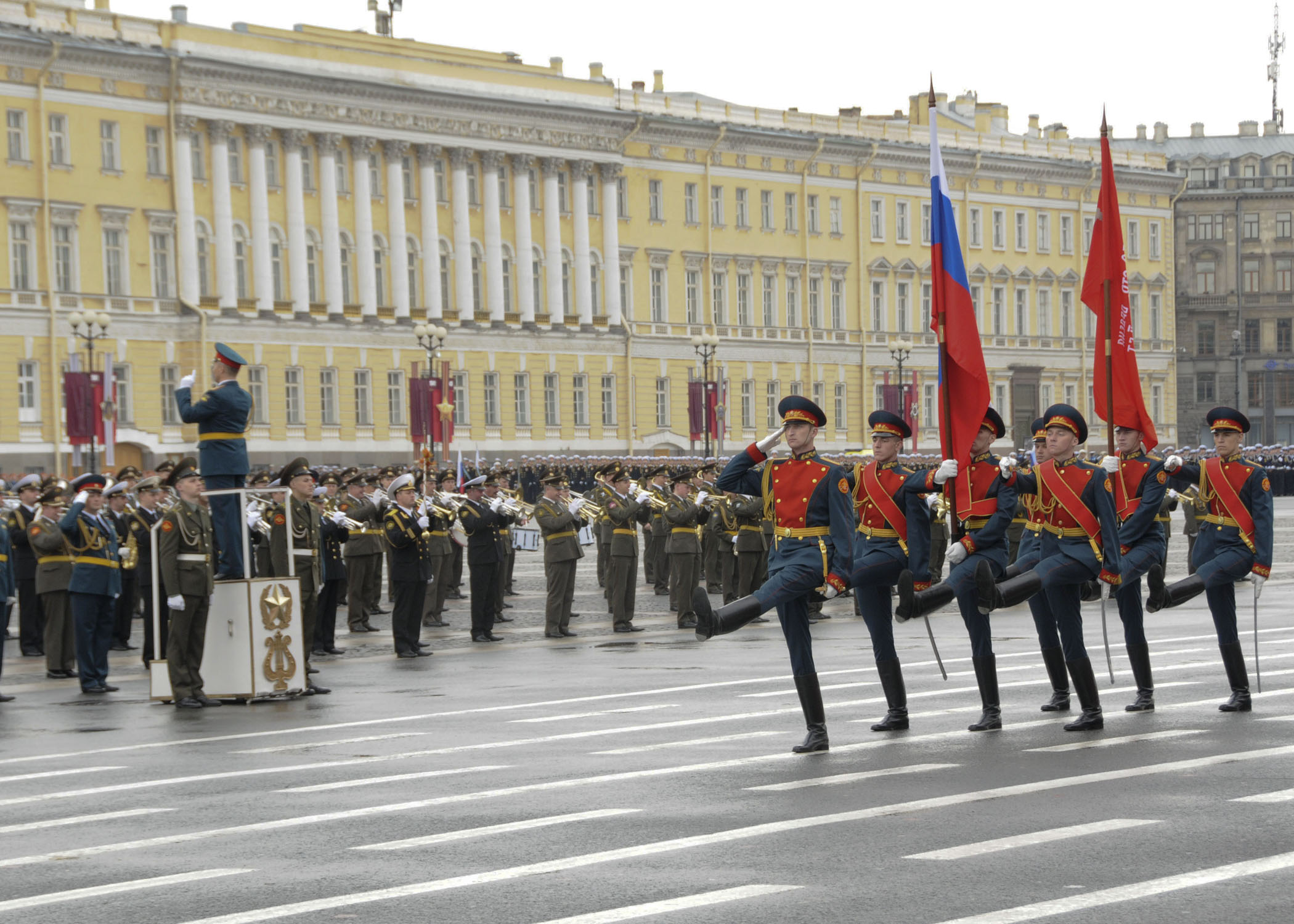
Colour Guard of the 154th Preobrazhensky Independent Commandant's Regiment at the 2010 Victory Day Parade in St. Petersburg.

The practices of the colour guards for the armed forces of a number of post-Soviet states in the Commonwealth of Independent States are similar to one another, adopting the practice from the former Soviet Armed Forces. Colour guards from these states are typically composed of a colour officer, one ensign or senior NCO holding the flag of their respective country as the national colour or the unit colour, and two enlisted personnel assisting the ensign. Active units, military academies, and guards of honour carry sabers in the colour guard, if needed, rifles may be substituted. The guard wears full or combat dress uniform.

If there are multiple colour guards marching in a parade at the same time, one guard is required to march directly behind the first guard. During the Soviet era, the Soviet flag was never allowed to be paraded by a military colour guard, with military and regimental flags only being paraded in colour guards. On occasion during the Soviet era, the Victory Banner was also used in colour guard teams, with the last known occasions being in 1975, 1977, 1985, 1987 and 1990.

However, several post-Soviet armed forces have deviated/modified the practices of the former Soviet colour guard; evident with the colour guards of the Turkmen Ground Forces, and the Armed Forces of Ukraine, whose colour guards dip their flags as a form of salute.

The customs practiced by the colour guards of the former Soviet Armed Forces was also adopted by the Mongolian Armed Forces, given the historical relationship between the two countries. Other countries such as Afghanistan, Cuba (replacing the United States practice after 1959), North Korea and Vietnam have adopted this variant of the Soviet system.

=== Romania ===
A standard template for a colour guard formation in the Romanian Armed Forces follows French precedent but with the addition of a colour officer leading the formation. The front of the guard is made up of the ensign, a junior officer, flanked by two armed or unarmed escorts, together with the colour officer, with three rear escorts behind the ensign.

From 1949 to 1986 the Army of the Socialist Republic of Romania and Securitate followed Soviet practice in colour guard training and protocols. Since that year the old tradition was restored in the uniformed organizations and thus remains till today in the country.

Colours of battalions and brigades are not provided with a colour guard at all since they were introduced in the 2000s.

=== Serbia ===
Given a shared heritage with Austria and Turkey plus its own traditions, the modern Serbian Armed Forces maintains a colour guard component. Every unit of the Armed Forces has a colour company that includes the colour company commander and the colour guards; which includes one ensign, usually a subaltern officer, two armed senior NCOs serving as colour escorts, and two honour guard platoons guarding the colour from the rear also armed. Unlike in other countries the colour guard company wears either full or combat dress. The Guard of the Serbian Armed Forces has its colour company wearing dress uniform.

=== Sweden ===
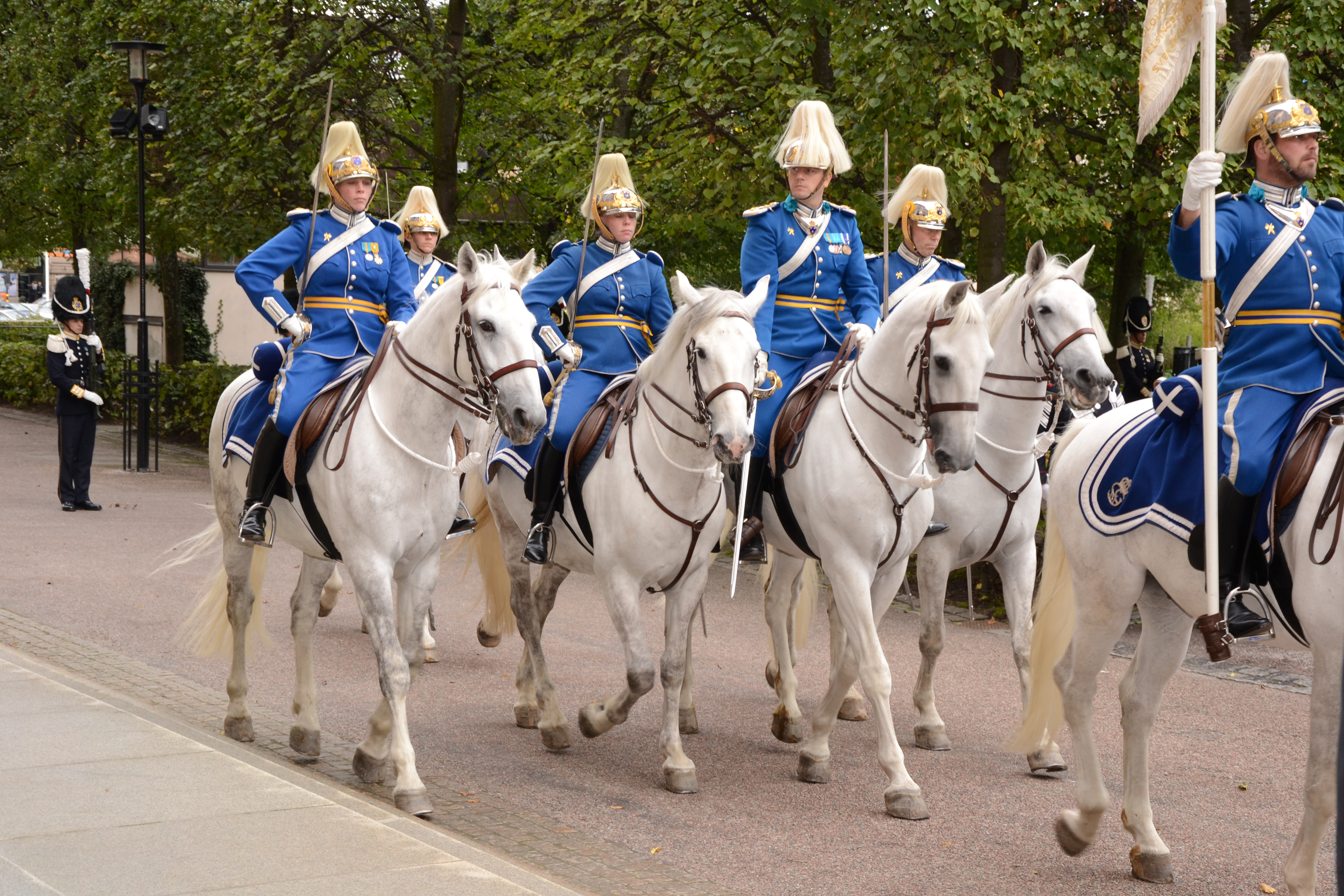
Swedish ceremonial colour guard at the opening of the Riksdag in 2011.

In Sweden the colour guard can be composed in three distinct manners: Greater colour guard, smaller colour guard and an officers guard. Each regiment, or military unit that carries a colour, in Sweden sets up its own colour guard. The Swedish military rank of fänrik (and the corresponding cavalry rank of kornett) was originally intended for the holder of the company flag. This duty was considered so prestigious that an officer was necessary to carry it out. Today, it is a regular officer rank.

==== Composition ====
An expanded colour guard composed of two commissioned officers, called fanförare (ensigns, literally carriers of the colour) and eight enlisted personnel behind the colour or colours. This stems from the time of king Gustavus Adolphus and the Thirty Years' War when all Swedish regiments had eight battalions. Each battalion contributed one soldier to the common colour guard. If one colour is carried the second officer serves as the colour officer.

A smaller colour guard is composed of one commissioned officer and four enlisted soldiers. An officers colour guard is composed of three commissioned officers, one ensign and two officer escorts carrying sabres.

=== United States ===
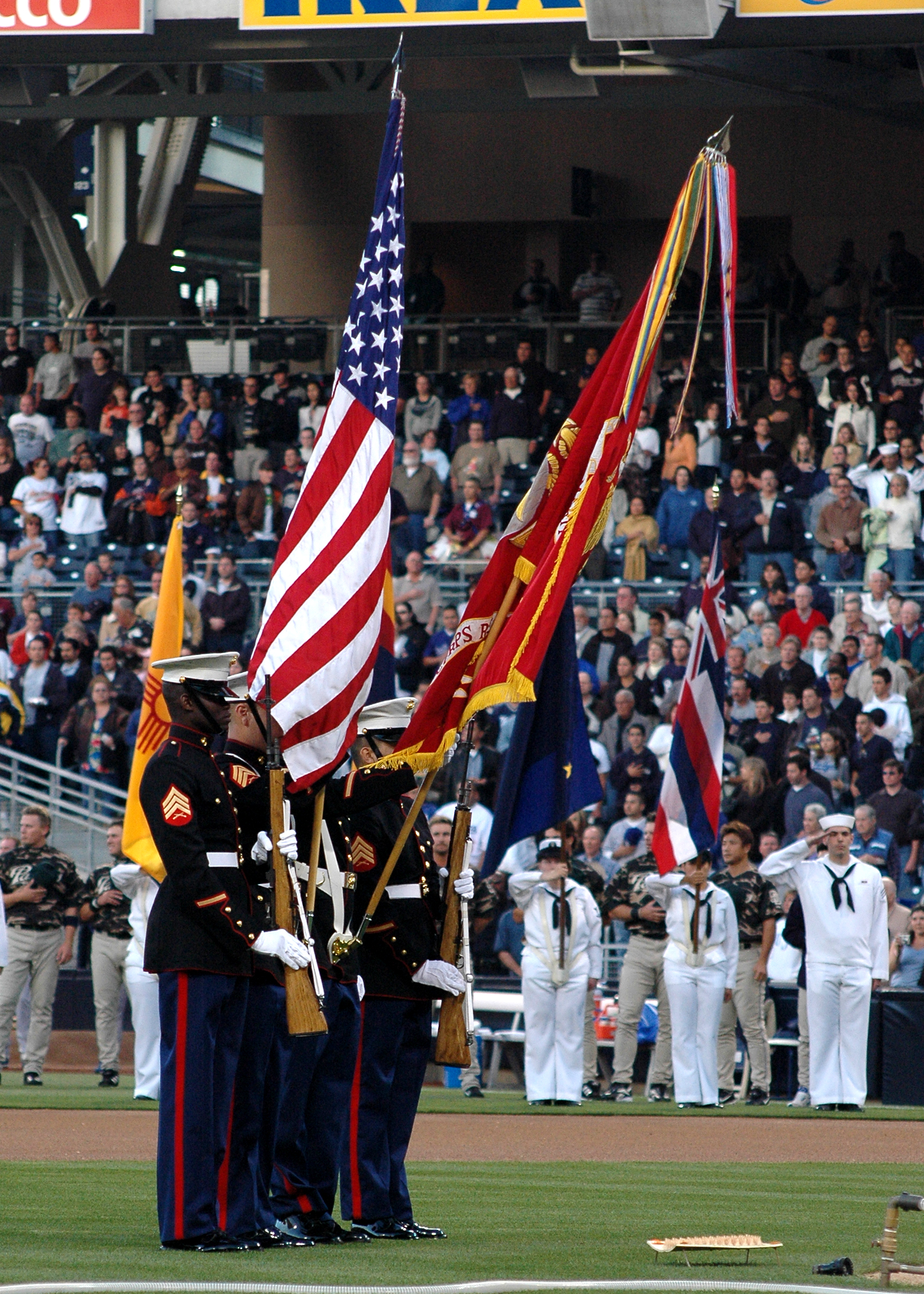
United States Marine Corps colour guard during the playing of "The Star-Spangled Banner". Note that the national flag does not dip.

In the military of the United States, the colour guard carries the national colour and other flags appropriate to its position in the chain of command. Typically these include a unit flag and a departmental flag (Army, Marines, Navy, Air Force, Space Force or Coast Guard, plus the National Guard Bureau (Army and/or Air Force)). In addition to the flag bearers, who are positioned in the center of the colour guard, there are two or more individuals who carry rifles and or sabres. This is a symbol that the flag (and its nation) will always be protected.

==== Composition of the US colour guard ====
In the U.S., traditionally, the unit's sergeant major is responsible for the safeguarding, care, and display of the organizational colours. The sergeant major is also responsible for the selection, training, and performance of the members. The colour guard consists of enlisted members and is commanded by the senior (colour) Sergeant, who carries the National Colors and gives the necessary commands for movements and rendering honours during drill exercises or parade ceremonies.

Being assigned to the colour guard is considered an honour due to the fact that these individuals present and carry the symbols of their unit and country. Depending on the circumstance and subject to the orders of their commander, members may wear full dress or less formal uniforms. It is mandatory for all members of the colour guard to wear headgear, for example, a garrison cap, beret, or service cap. On occasion, certain colour guards can be horse-mounted.

A US colour guard is made up of a "Color Sergeant" carrying the National Colours and serves as the unit commander, a unit or command colour bearer, and two colour escorts carrying rifles and/or sabres. If multiple colours are carried, multiple colour bearers may be needed.

==== Rendering honours and Maneuvering ====
The U.S. colour guard is formed and marched in one rank at close interval. Since the National Colors must always be in the position of honour on the right, the colour guard must execute a special movement to reverse direction. It does not execute rear march, nor does it execute about face. Rather, it performs a maneuver derived from the standard counter-column command, generally known as counter march or colour reverse march, in order to keep the precedence of flags in order.

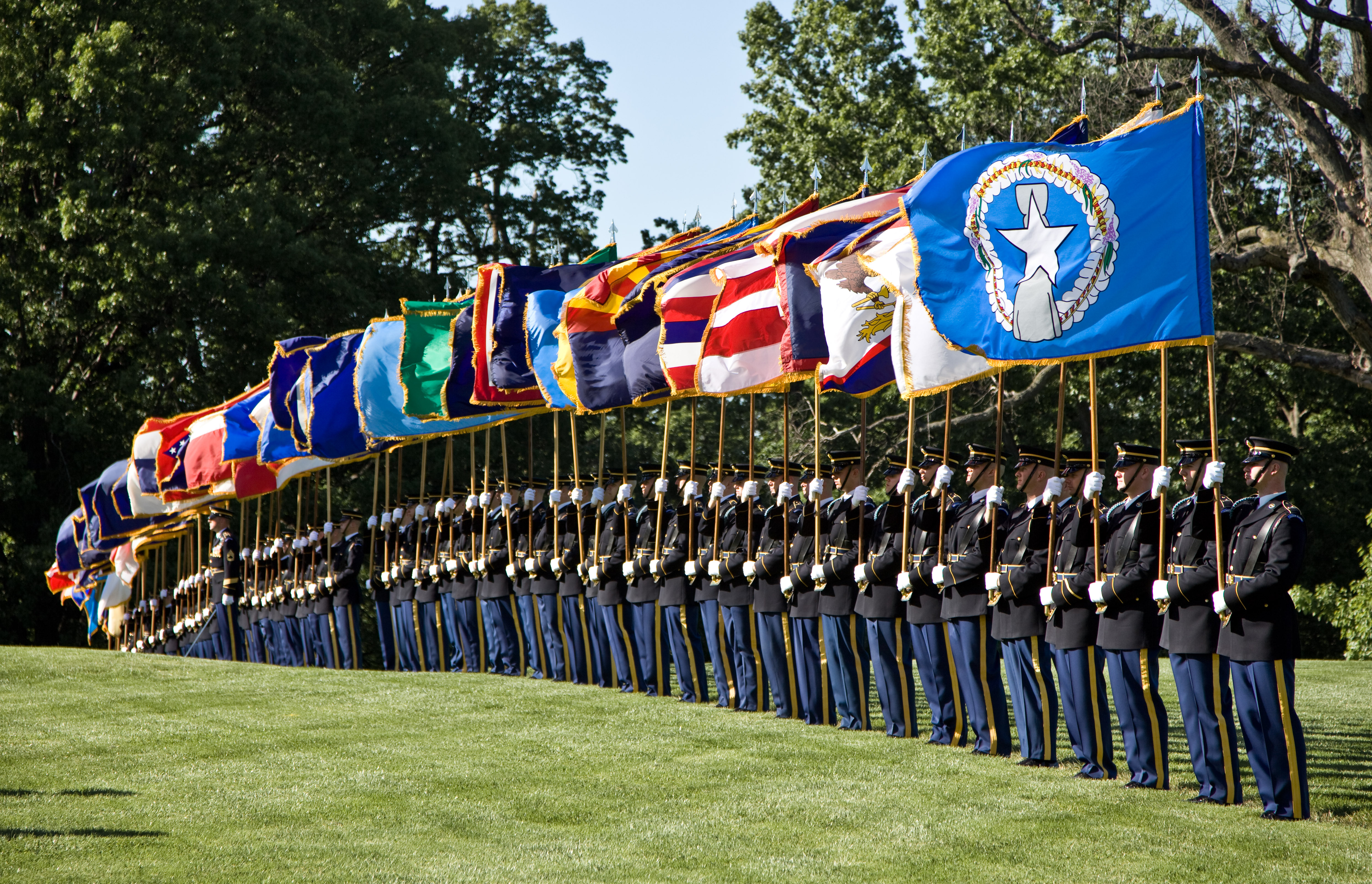
A colour guard detachment from the 3rd U.S. Infantry Regiment in full dress. Color guards of the U.S. Armed Forces typically wear full-dress, or less formal attire.

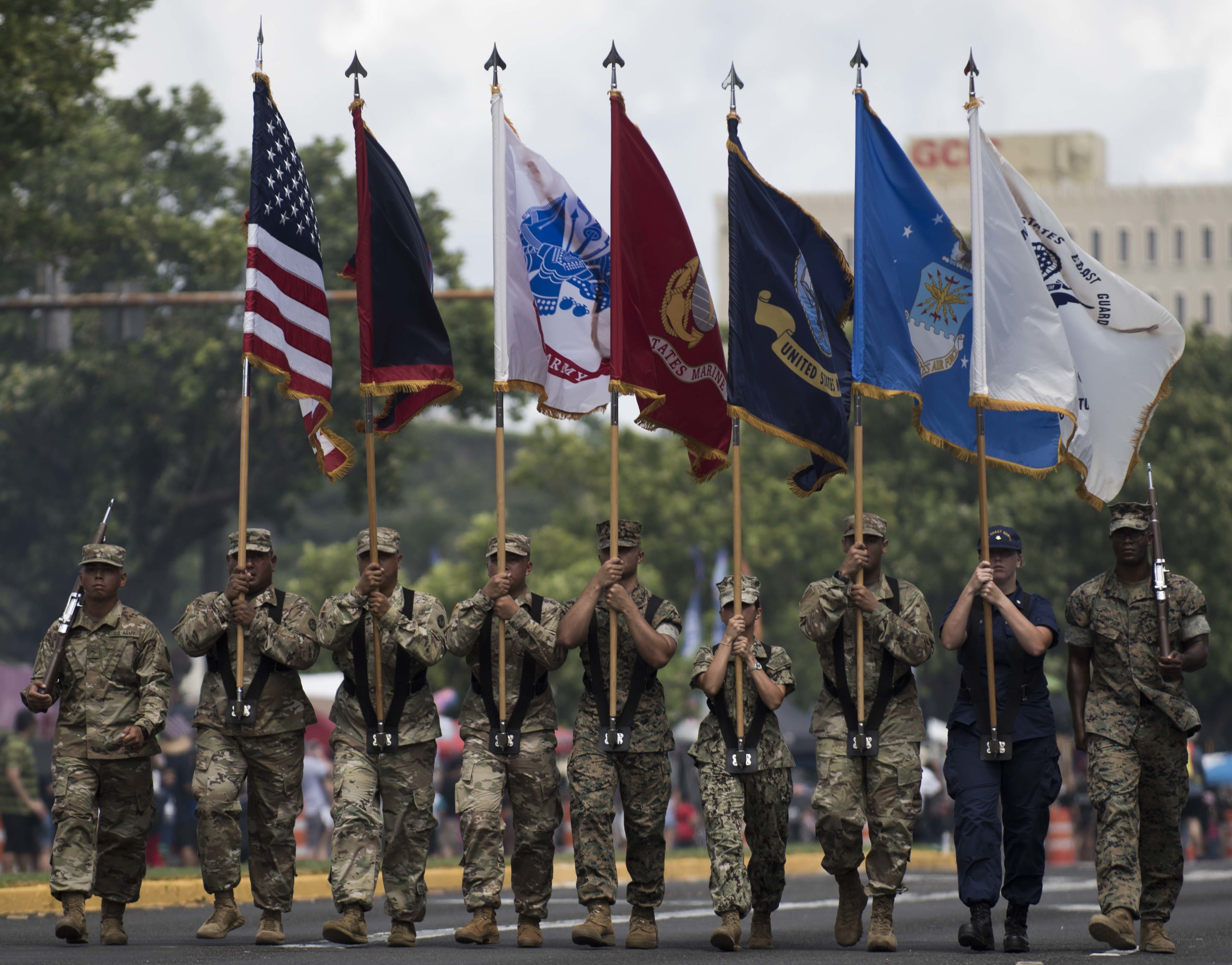
Joint colour guard marching at Guam

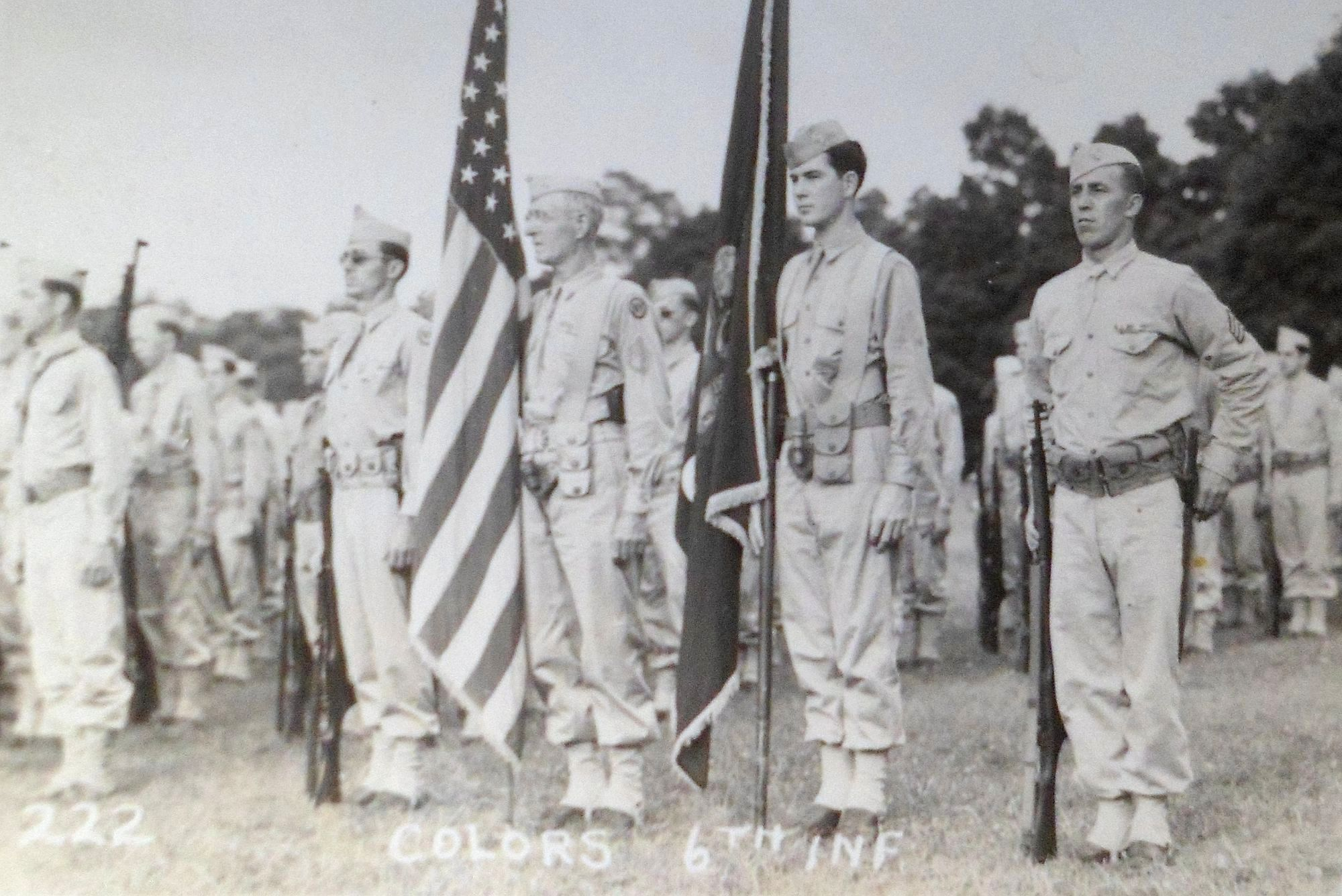
WW II Color Guard of the 6th Infantry, 1945 See also: Similar image

Other drill movements performed by the colour guard include presenting arms, left and right wheel (turns) marches, eyes right (upon passing the reviewing stand during a parade), casing / uncasing the colour, and fixing/unfixing bayonets (by the arms bearers). Liberation Day parade.

The colour guard renders honours when the national anthem is played or sung, when passing in review during a parade, or in certain other circumstances. In these cases, the unit and departmental flags salute by dipping (leaning the flag forward). However, with the exception of a response to a naval salute, the United States national flag renders no salute. This is enshrined in the United States Flag Code and U.S. law.

In the U.S. military, individuals or units passing or being passed by uncased (unfurled) colours render honours when outdoors. Individuals who are not part of any formation begin the hand salute when the colours are six paces distant and hold it until they have passed six paces beyond the colours.

Civilians are expected to stand at the position of attention with their right hand placed over their heart for the same period, and the hand salute applies to uniformed organizations as well (specifically the Boy Scouts of America and Girl Scouts of the USA). Since recently, veterans are expected to hand salute the colours too, like their military counterparts including personnel not in uniform.

=== Vatican City ===
In the Swiss Guard, the bearer of the colour (either the official colour of the Guard or a ceremonial version of the national flag) is the sergeant major of the guard. On such occasions, he is protected by two guardsmen (one to either side, ranked at either corporal or vice-corporal) carrying flame-bladed swords in place of the Guard's nominal ceremonial weapon, the halberd.

== In film and television ==
"On Guard: A Story of American Youth" is 2023 documentary film directed by Allen Otto and executive produced by Jim Czarnecki. The film premiered at the 2023 Philadelphia Latino Film Festival. The film follows the journey of an all-female colour guard team at Bel Air High School whose goal is to qualify for the 2020 WGI World Championships, which were ultimately canceled due to the COVID-19 pandemic, with a performance dedicated to the victims of the 2019 El Paso Walmart shooting.

Contemporary Color is a 2016 documentary film directed by Turner Ross and Bill Ross IV. The film was produced as a collaboration between David Byrne, Michael Gottwald, Dan Janvey and Josh Penn.

== See also ==
- Guard of honour
- Presentation of Colours
- Trooping the Colour
- Striking the colors
