= Valley Forge Military Academy =

Private military academy in Pennsylvania

Coordinates: 40.0542°N 75.3835°W

- Wayne, Radnor Township, Pennsylvania; United States

Information
- Type: Private military boarding and day school
- Motto: Courage • Honor • Conquer
- Established: 1928; 98 years ago
- Grades: 7–12
- Campus: Suburban
- Colors: Buff; Blue
- Mascot: Trojans
- Website: www.vfmacademy.org

Valley Forge Military Academy (VFMA) was an all-male private college-preparatory boarding school and day school (grades 7–12) in Wayne, Pennsylvania. It followed in the traditional military school format with and specialized in student leadership.

Until 2023, the academy and Valley Forge Military College operated jointly as Valley Forge Military Academy and College, before separating into two institutions with independent governance.

On September 15, 2025, VFMA announced that it would close after the 2025–26 academic year, citing rising costs and falling enrollment. In November 2025, classes were ended for students in grades 7 to 11 with the senior class scheduled to graduate in May 2026.

The closure does not affect Valley Forge Military College, which continues operating.

== The Corps of Cadets ==
All VFMA Cadets join the student-run Corps of Cadets, an honor they earn by passing a board examination to earn a "capshield". Cadet uniforms are styled after the Royal Military Academy Sandhurst. The VFMA Regimental Sergeant Major, Drum Major and Field Music Drum Major wear the British Army Foot Guard uniform, including the red coat and bearskin. Cadet Senior Non-Commissioned Officers (NCOs) carry a British Army pace stick, modeled on those carried by British warrant officers.

== History ==
=== 1928 – 2005 ===
Valley Forge Military Academy was founded in 1928 by Lieutenant General Milton G. Baker, Pennsylvania Guard (Retired). For the first five months of its existence, the school was located in Devon, Pennsylvania, on the south side of Berkley Road, between Dorset and Waterloo roads, which is several miles away from the campus's current location. After a fire during the night of January 17–18, 1929 destroyed the original single-building campus, the former Devon Park Hotel, the academy was moved to its present site in Wayne, Pennsylvania, the former Saint Luke's School. The highest decoration in the institution, the Order of Anthony Wayne, was made in tribute to the heroism of the first Corps of Cadets on the night that the first campus burned down.

Initially, General Baker devised an American Revolutionary War motif for the school. The school colors are buff and blue, the colors of the uniforms of the Continental Army. The buildings in the Wayne campus were named for Revolutionary War leaders. At the same time, the academy modeled uniforms, crest, Alma Mater, and rank structure on those of the United States Military Academy at West Point, New York.

In the late 1940s to 1950s, Baker, an Anglophile, began changing the concept and modeled many of the school's drills, customs, and ceremonies after a British motif. The Full Dress Uniforms are modeled from the British Army, while others are ostensibly West Point and British hybrids.

Baker retired as superintendent in 1971 and died at his home on July 31, 1976, at 80.

=== Superintendents and presidents ===
- Lieutenant General Milton G. Baker, Pennsylvania Guard (Retired), 1928–1971
- Lieutenant General Milton H. Medenbach, Pennsylvania Guard (Retired), 1971
- Major General Robert W. Strong Jr., United States Air Force, (Retired), 1971–1973
- Lieutenant General Willard Pearson, United States Army (Retired), 1973–1985
- Lieutenant General Alexander M. Weyand, United States Army (Retired) 1985–1989
- Colonel Harold J. Fraley, United States Army (Retired), 1989–1990
- Vice Admiral N. Ronald Thunman, United States Navy (Retired), 1990–1993

=== Title changed to President in 1992 ===
- Rear Admiral Virgil L. Hill Jr., United States Navy (Retired) 1993–2000
- Rear Admiral Peter A.C. Long, United States Navy (Retired) 2000–2004
- Charles A. McGeorge 2004–2009
- William R. Floyd Jr., 2009–2010
- Colonel David R. Gray, United States Army (Retired) 2010–2012
- Colonel James J. Doyle, USMC, (Retired), Interim President, 2012–2013
- Stacey R. Sauchuk, 2013–2016
- Colonel John C. Church Jr., USMCR (Retired) 2016–2018
- Major General Walter T. Lord U.S. Army (Retired) Class of 1984 (College) 2018–2019
- Colonel Stuart B. Helgeson, USMCR (Retired) 2020–2023
- Lauren Wochok 2023–2024
- Katie Newsom Feb 2025–Aug 2025

== Academics ==
The academy offers a college preparatory curriculum with a focus on leadership, discipline, and civic responsibility.

Academically, the school is organized into six classes. The academy classes are as follows: First Class: Seniors (12th Grade); Second Class: Juniors (11th Grade); Third Class: Sophomores (10th Grade); Fourth Class: Freshmen (9th Grade); Fifth Class: 8th Grade; and Sixth Class: 7th Grade. Thus, the system is somewhat "inverted" from the "Form" system in use at some schools and more closely parallels West Point and the other FSAs.

== Military structure ==
Cadet life is modeled after the U.S. military, including a rank structure, drills, inspections, and a student chain of command.

=== Ranks used by the VFMA Corps of Cadets ===
This is the complete list of ranks used by the Corps of Cadets of the VFMA. Former, unused, and honorary ranks are in italics.

Cadet Officers

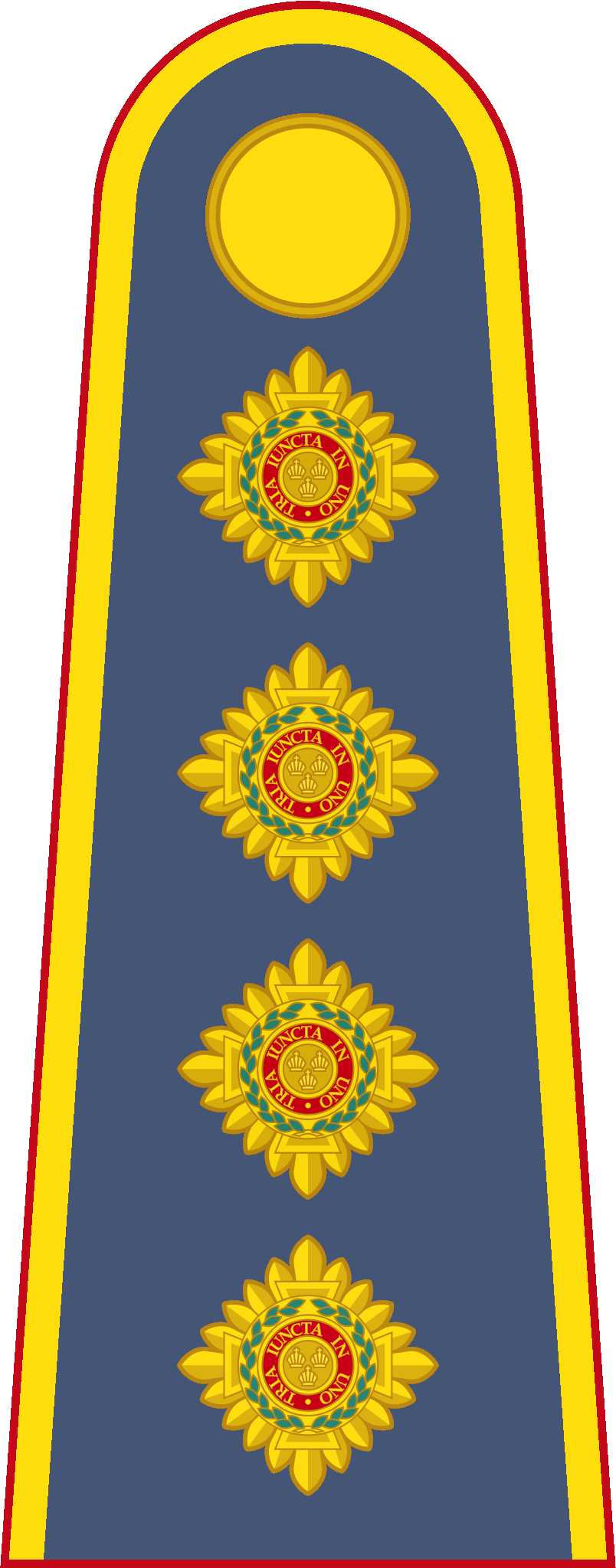
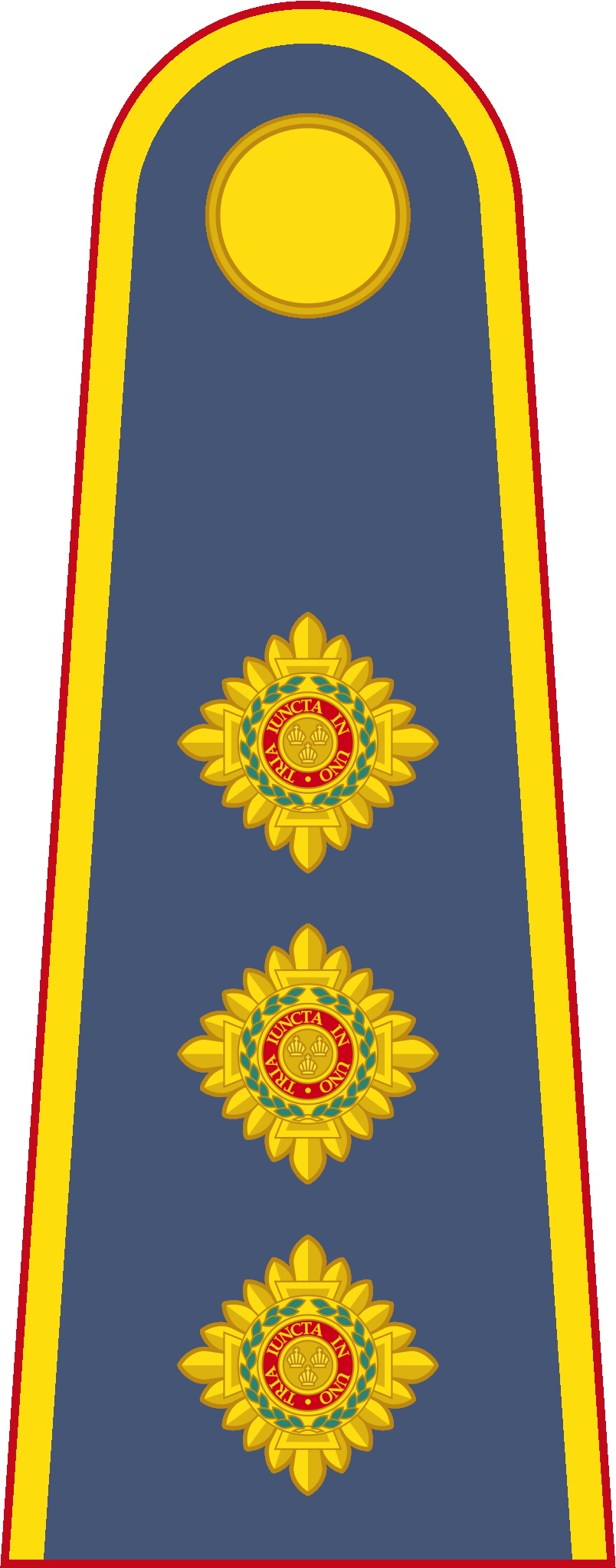
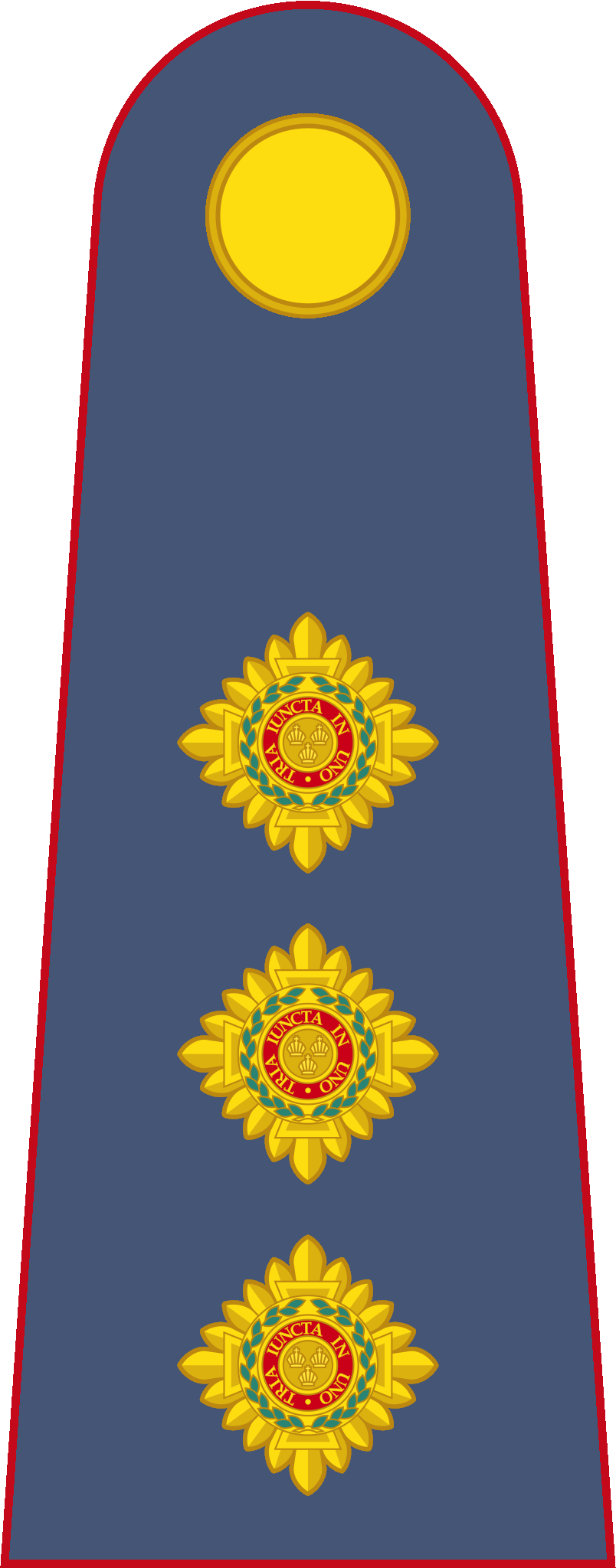
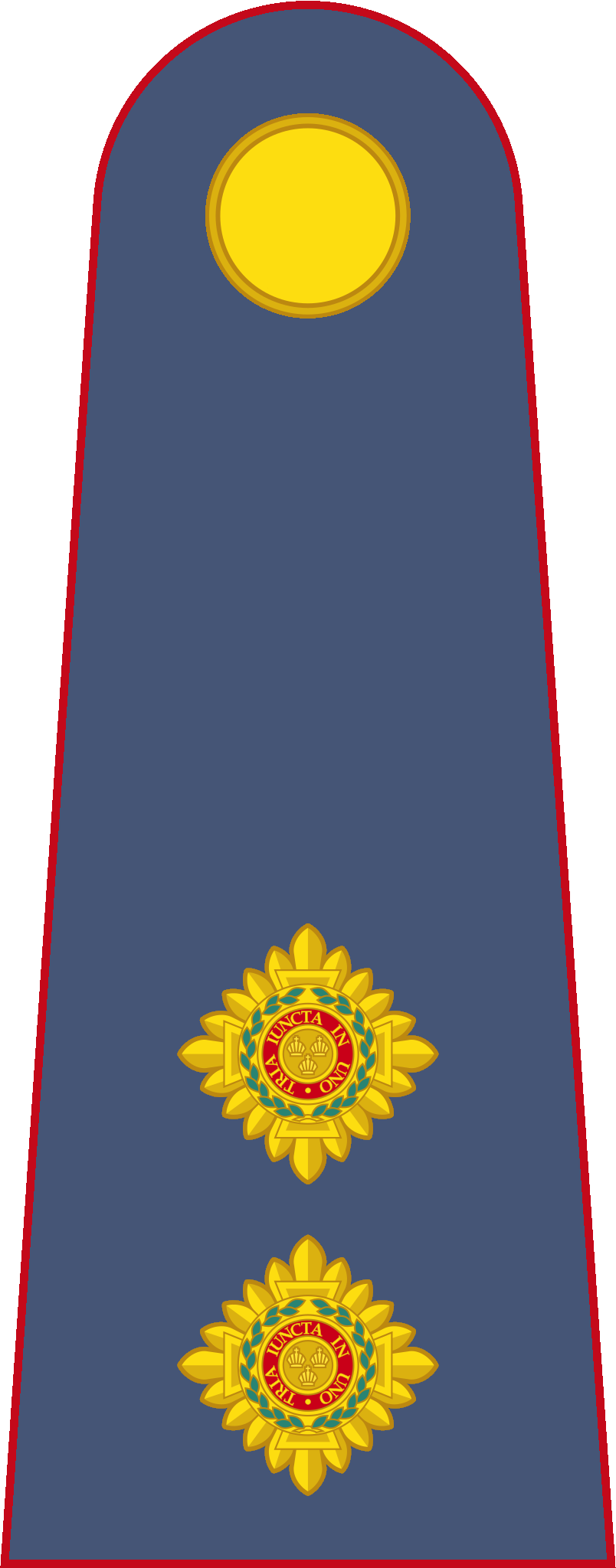
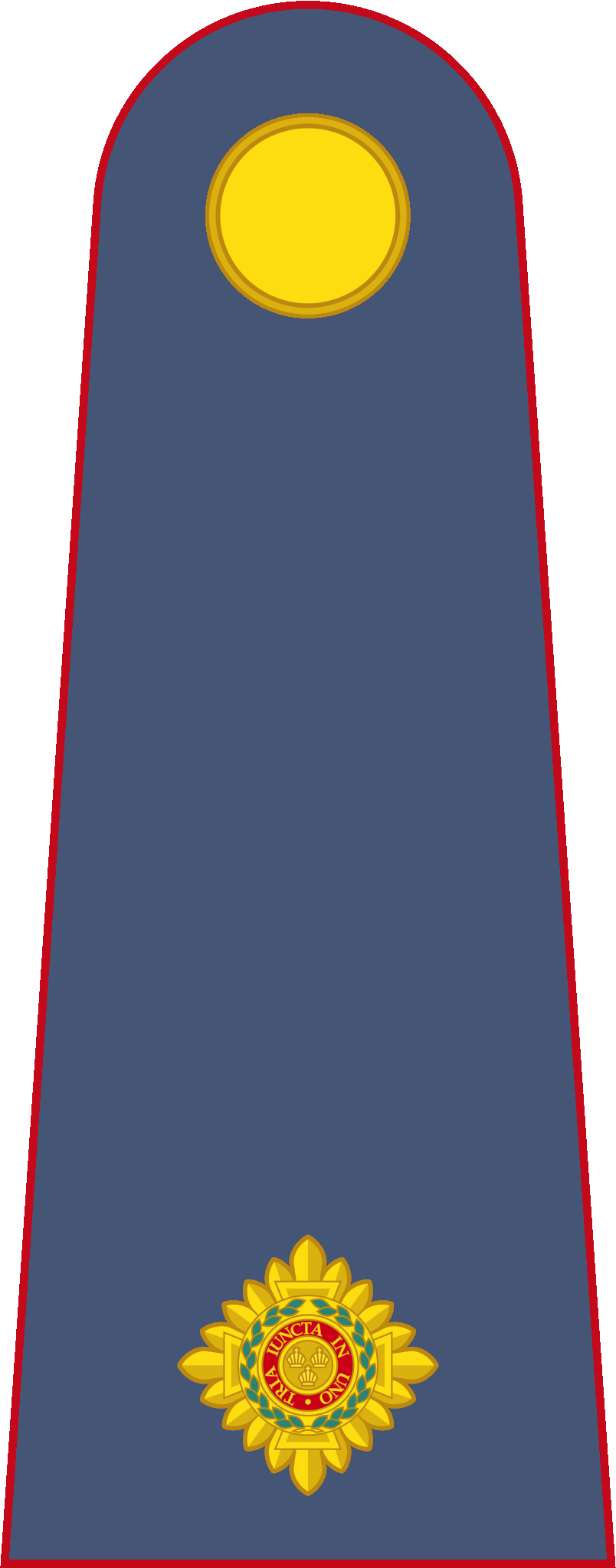
Grade	C/O-3			C/O-2	C/O-1
	Cadet First Captain (Regimental Commander) (introduced 2016)	Cadet Second Captain to Eight Captain	Cadet Captain (Company Commander, Battalion Executive Officer)	Cadet First Lieutenant	Cadet Second Lieutenant

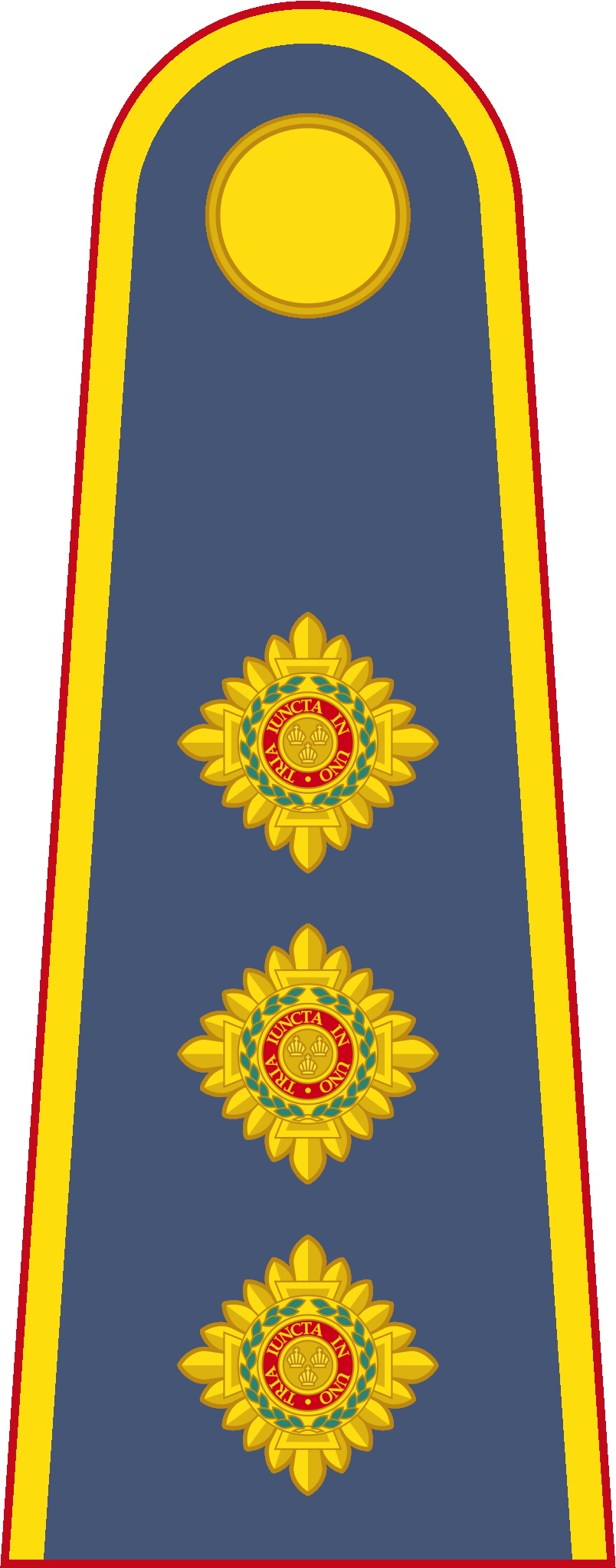
Grade	C/O-3
	Cadet Second Captain (Regimental Executive Officer)	Cadet Third Captain (College Battalion Commander)	Cadet Fourth Captain (Academy Battalion Commander)	Cadet Fifth Captain (Regimental Adjutant)	Cadet Sixth Captain (Regimental Training Officer)	Cadet Seventh Captain (Provost Marshal)	Cadet Eighth Captain (Regimental Quartermaster)

Cadet Enlisted and NCO's

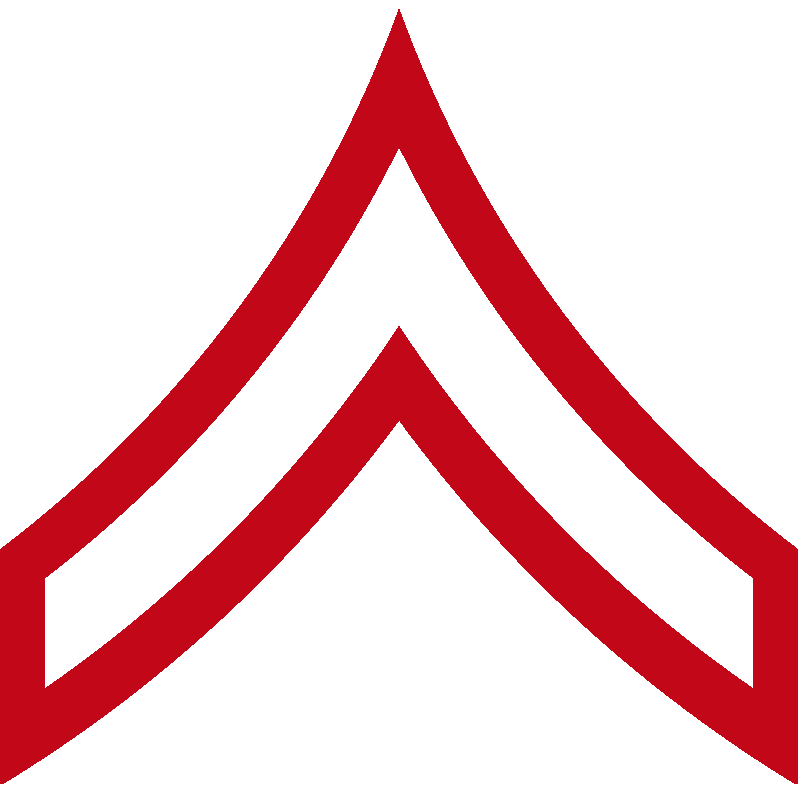
Grade	C/E-9		C/E-8				C/E-7			C/E-6			C/E-5		C/E-4		C/E-3	C/E-2	C/E-1
																			No insignia
	Cadet Regimental Sergeant Major (British Army Foot Guards Uniform)	Cadet Battalion Sergeant Major	Cadet Regimental Supply Sergeant	Cadet Battalion Supply Sergeant	Cadet First Sergeant	Cadet Master Sergeant	Cadet Color Sergeant	Cadet Sergeant First Class Colors	Cadet Sergeant First Class	Cadet Staff Sergeant Colors	Cadet Staff Sergeant, Guide	Cadet Staff Sergeant	Cadet Sergeant Colors	Cadet Sergeant	Cadet Corporal Colors	Cadet Corporal	Cadet Lance Corporal		Cadet Private

=== Royalty ===
VFMA is a popular school for various royal families. It graduated King Simeon II of Bulgaria. The school serves as Honor Guard to the British Royal Family on State Visits to Philadelphia. Selected cadets also participate in the annual The Versailles Foundation Inc. / Claude Monet-Giverny Dinner.

=== British military traditions in VFMA ===
The British-style drill was practiced at VFMA until early 2014 but returned in 2017. Many Tactical Officers and staff have been serving, including Command Sergeants Major, Bandmasters, and Commandants and retired members of the British Armed Forces from the Royal Navy, British Army, and Royal Marines. Events such as the Military Tattoo, Regimental Dining In, and Vespers reflect British traditions. Even the Regimental Band reflects this practice in recent years, having been now patterned in the style of the Royal Marines Band Service and British Army line infantry bands. Field Music directly reflects the British military volunteer Corps of Drums.

Cadet Regimental Sergeant Major and Band and Field Music Drum Major wear British Army Foot Guard uniforms.

Cadet senior NCOs carry British Army pace sticks.

=== Coat of arms ===
LTG Baker, the founder, designed the coat of arms in 1928. "It consists of a emblem borne on a shield and surmounted by a crest. The shield is of red and white vertical stripes with a blue field containing thirteen stars, one for each of the original states. the crest comprises an eagle with wings displayed and a scroll bearing the motto 'Courage, Honor, Conquer.' The emblem consists of a representation of General George Washington kneeling in prayer in the snow at Valley Forge, over crossed cavalry sabres and surrounded with a circular margin.

== Academics and student life ==
The school day generally begins with "First Call" followed by "Reveille," at which time all cadets arise and prepare for formation. Buglers play calls. "First Mess" or breakfast is followed by cleaning details and room preparation. "School Call" is followed by academic classes until lunch, or "Second Mess."

After Second Mess, cadets attend academic classes until mid-afternoon. After classes, cadets participate in athletics and extracurricular activities. Cadets may also receive extra instruction during this time. At one time, there were daily formal "Guard Mount" and "Retreat" formations. Owing to the increased tempo of cadet life and requirements of athletics and co-curricular activities needed to have cadets competitively vie for college admission, highly formal Retreat formations are no longer routinely held.

After "Third Mess" or the evening meal, cadets return to their barracks for a mandatory study hall, Sunday through Thursday, from 7:30 pm to 9:30 pm. They are supervised by faculty officers in rotation. After "Recall" from Study Hall comes the Break, at which time cadets use the telephone, shine shoes, and prepare for the next day. The Break is ended by "Call to Quarters" "Tattoo" and "Taps." At Taps, all cadets, except those granted "Late Lights" to study and cadets of the college, are required to be in bed.

On selected weekends, Cadets are permitted to leave at home. Cadets who achieve academically and in personal efficiency and leadership are allowed additional leaves and local leaves into Wayne and to the King of Prussia Mall.

New Cadets at Valley Forge Military Academy go through a 6-week adjustment period, known as "Cadet Candidate Training" upon entering the institution. During this period, students are trained in the customs and traditions of the school, a modified version of British military drills, and ceremonies. They are given an opportunity to acclimate to the overall campus environment. The conclusion of this period occurs when the students complete the traditional requirement of earning their "Capshield", the brass crest that adorns the uniform cap.

=== Character Education program and chapel ===
All cadets attend monthly character development training at The Alumni Memorial Chapel of St. Cornelius the Centurion.

The Chapel contains a 1961 M. P. Moller Pipe Organ donated by the Richard King Mellon family. The organ was dedicated in May 1965, by the Alumni, to Constance Prosser Mellon, wife of Lieutenant General R.K. Mellon.

== Athletics and traditions ==
=== Athletics ===
VFMA is a member of the PIAA and competes in 6 inter-school sports teams.

Starting in fall 2020, VFMA offers a Varsity eSports Program. Grades 8-12 compete in the High School eSports League. Grades 7 & 8 compete in the Middle School eSports League.

=== Songs ===
The singing of school songs is a tradition at VFMAC. The main songs, among others, are "VFMAC Alma Mater", "the Line of Gray", "Spirit of the Forge", and the "Army Song". Typically, only the first and last verses of the Alma Mater are sung.

==== The Valley Forge Military Academy Regimental Band ====
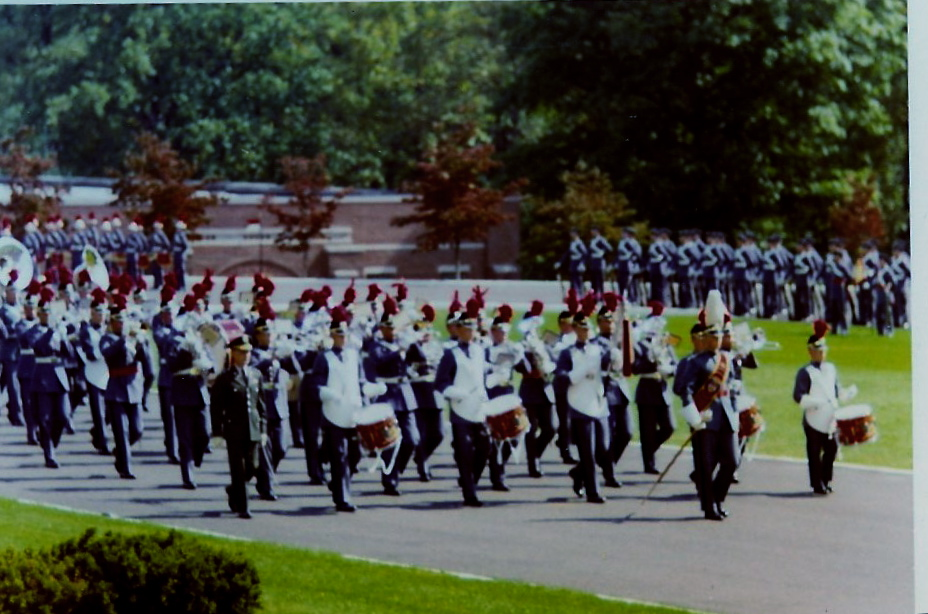
VFMA Regimental Band on Parade, circa 1970

In January 1970, the Philadelphia Orchestra, conducted by Eugene Ormandy, and the Valley Forge Military Academy Band under the leadership of Colonel D. Keith Feltham, performed the "1812 Overture" (full title: Festival Overture "The Year 1812", op. 49); by Pyotr Ilyich Tchaikovsky live at the Academy of Music in Philadelphia. The concert was attended by United States President Richard Nixon. After the rousing performance, Ormandy heralded the cadets as the "Philadelphia Orchestra of Military Bands" and was inspired to produce an updated recording of the overture. In the fall of 1970, the VFMA recorded their tracks of the production in Columbia Studios in New York City.

In addition to the VFMA Band, the recording featured the Mormon Tabernacle Choir, directed by Richard P. Condie.

== In popular culture ==
Much of the movie Taps (1981), starring George C. Scott and Timothy Hutton, was filmed on the academy's campus. Many of its young stars, including Hutton, Sean Penn, and Tom Cruise, participated in 45 days of orientation with the students of the academy to learn to drill properly as cadets. While most of the actors enjoyed and excelled at their orientation, Cruise opted to leave the training for the comforts of a nearby hotel until filming began, reportedly to isolate himself and "get into the mindset" of his psychopathic character, Cadet Captain David Shawn. Although Taps was presented as depicting core values in a positive light, including honor and loyalty, after the filming, LTG Pearson felt that there was an anti-military tone within the plot of the film. A note in the end credits says the events in the film are not meant to reflect "the educational philosophy or teachings" of then-Valley Forge Military Academy and Junior College.

== Notable alumni ==
=== Athletics ===
- Aaron Beasley – professional football player, NFL (Jacksonville Jaguars, New York Jets, Atlanta Falcons)
- Chris Doleman – retired professional football player and Pro Football Hall of Famer
- Larry Fitzgerald – professional football player, NFL (Arizona Cardinals)
- Karl Hankton – professional football player, NFL (Carolina Panthers)
- Rasheed Marshall – professional football player, 5th round draft pick (West Virginia) NFL (San Francisco 49ers)
- Gary Stills – professional football player, NFL (Kansas City Chiefs, Baltimore Ravens)
- Larry Smith – professional football player, 2nd round draft pick (Florida State) NFL Jacksonville-Green Bay

=== Business ===
- William R. ("Bill") Tiefel – chairman of the board of CarMax, Inc.; retired chairman of The Ritz-Carlton Hotel Company, vice chairman of Marriott International, and director of Bulgari hotels and resorts.
- Moritz Hunzinger, CEO Cashcloud SA (Luxemburg), Executive Board Member Gemballa SE (Leonberg), CEO Emeritus (1979–2004) of infas Holding AG – previously Hunzinger Information AG, Media Entrepreneur, Professor of Public Relations and Communication, graduated 1977 from VFMA.

=== Entertainment ===
- Steve Agee – actor/comedian/writer: The Suicide Squad, Superstore, The Sarah Silverman Program
- Jimmy Sturr – musician: 14-time Grammy winner
- Barry Sandrew, Ph.D. – neuroscientist, inventor, serial entrepreneur, and pioneering filmmaker who invented colorization and 3-D conversion of feature films
- Kristian Bruun – actor: Notable Canadian actor known for roles in Orphan Black, Carter, The Handmaid's Tale and Madea Takes Manhattan.

=== Law enforcement ===
- John H. Sinclair, commander of the Vermont State Police and United States Marshal for the District of Vermont

=== Military ===
- Paul E. Galanti – Commander, United States Navy (Retired); veterans' advocate
- Herbert Raymond "H.R." McMaster – former National Security Advisor; Lieutenant General, United States Army; historian, author, and former commander of the 3rd Armored Cavalry Regiment during Operation Iraqi Freedom
- Gary Roughead – Admiral, United States Navy (Retired): Chief of Naval Operations
- Alfred A. Sanelli – Brigadier General, Pennsylvania Guard (1921–2005): one of the first cadets, Professor of Military Science, Dean of the academy, Dean of the Junior College, and Chaplain, Valley Forge Military Academy and College, until his death
- H. Norman Schwarzkopf Jr. – General, United States Army (Retired), CENTCOM Commander, Operation Desert Storm
- Kevin R. Wendel – major general, United States Army: Commander, 3rd Brigade, 1st Cavalry Division, 20th Chemical, Biological, Radiological, Nuclear and high-yield Explosives Command, First Army Division East, First United States Army, Combined Security Transition Command – Afghanistan.
- John J. Yeosock – lieutenant general, United States Army (retired), commander, Third Army, Operation Desert Storm.
- Peter Huchthausen – captain in the United States Navy and the author of several maritime books

=== Politics ===
- Steve Chiongbian Solon – Congressman of the Lone Province of Sarangani in the Philippines
- Rafael Hernández Colón – fourth Governor, Commonwealth of Puerto Rico
- Bryan R. Lentz – Democratic politician: State Representative, Pennsylvania House of Representatives, 161st Legislative District
- Bob Mensch – Republican state senator: Pennsylvania State Senate, 24th Senate District
- Westley W.O. Moore – United States Army: Rhodes Scholar, White House Fellow, author of The Other Wes Moore, youth advocate, Governor of Maryland
- Warren Rudman – New Hampshire Republican United States Senator from 1980 to 1993, and New Hampshire Attorney General from 1970 to 1976.
- Simeon Saxe-Coburg-Gotha – King Simeon II of Bulgaria, and Prime Minister of Bulgaria from 2001 to 2005
- Prince Hermann Friedrich of Leiningen

=== Writers ===
- J. D. Salinger – author: The Catcher in the Rye
