= Three Mile Island (Lake Winnipesaukee) =

Island in New Hampshire, United States

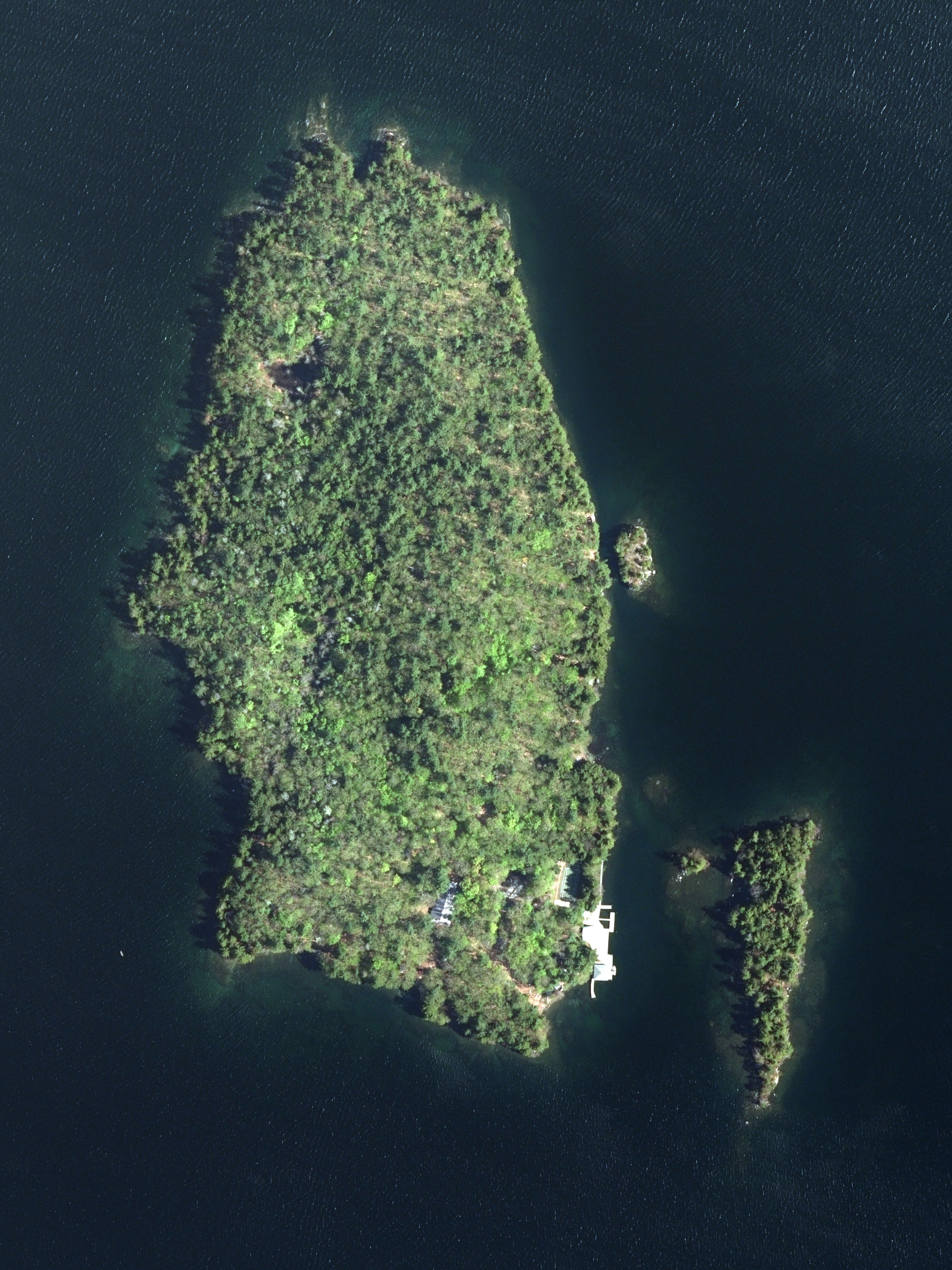
- Three Mile Island (left), shown here with Rock Island (middle right), Hawks Nest Island (bottom right), and Nabby Island (between Three Mile and Hawks Nest)

- Location within New Hampshire Lakes Region

Geography
- Location: Lake Winnipesaukee, Meredith, New Hampshire
- Coordinates: 43.6710°N 71.4222°W
- Area: 43 acres (17 ha)
- Coastline: 1 mi (2 km)(approx)
- Highest elevation: 554 ft (168.9 m)(50 ft (15 m) above water level)

Administration
- United States
- State: New Hampshire
- County: Belknap County
- Town: Meredith

Three Mile Island is an island on Lake Winnipesaukee in New Hampshire, located three miles from the town of Center Harbor. It has been owned by the Appalachian Mountain Club (AMC) since 1900 and is run as a full-service camp during the summer.

== Geography ==
Three Mile Island covers an area of 43 acres (17 ha) and is approximately 0.5 miles (0.8 km) long, 0.25 miles (0.4 km) wide, and 1 mile (1.6 km) around. The highest point on the island, a ridge running north to south, is between 50 feet (15 m) and 60 feet (18 m) above the water line. The shoreline is mostly stone, although there are at least three small sandy beaches. There are no major bodies of water on the island, although there are 5 swamps—the largest being the Rhododendron Swamp. There are three smaller uninhabited islands within 300 feet (90 m) of Three Mile: Hawk's Nest Island, Rock Island, and Nabby Island.

Flora on the island is typical of the region: a mix of deciduous and evergreen trees, including maple, pine, oak, and witch-hazel, and a mix of ground plants, including Canada mayflower, sheep laurel, iris, pink lady's slipper, and the endangered ram's-head lady's slipper. Wild blackberries, blueberries, and huckleberries can also be found on the island. Fauna includes a number of water birds, including ducks, Canada geese, and loons, bats, rodents such as squirrels, chipmunks, and mink, and the occasional large mammal such as deer or moose that either walk to the island while the lake is frozen or swim over after it has thawed.

== Three Mile Island Camp ==
The AMC acquired the island through a combination of donations and purchases between 1899 and 1900, and currently runs a full-service family camp on the island. Campers stay in one of the 47 16-foot cabins or 5 wood-framed tents for one or two weeks during the 9-week summer season. Each cabin features two beds and a private dock, but do not have electricity or running water. A limited number of the closer cabins are available for four fall weekends, and other programs such as a music camp and yoga retreat are also held on the island.

During the summer weeks three meals a day are provided, as are a variety of activities and programs. Hiking trails, tennis and volleyball courts, and several public buildings are available to campers free of charge, and sailboats and canoes are available for a nominal fee. Only four of the camper-used buildings on the island have electricity: the central lodge where meals are served, the recreational hall on the main dock, the changing facilities on the main dock, and the quiet Retreat reading room. Only the lodge and changing rooms have running water. There are no flush toilets on the island, although there are several outhouses, including two composting outhouses from Clivus Multrum. Access to the island is by boat, either a private vessel or the launch run by the camp, which operates three times a day during the summer. Typical daily activities include exploration of the woods, swimming, boating, conservation programs, crafts, and relaxation. Electronics, including cell phones and laptops, are not allowed in any public areas.

During its 100-plus-year history, several traditions have evolved on the island. Every morning, campers are woken to reveille played on the bugle. First Call is played to signal campers to the main lodge for meals, although tradition calls for campers not to sit until the Mess Call is played signaling the start of the meal. During the summer weeks, a Town Meeting is held on the Saturday night that campers arrive, where the camp manager will go over the island's policies and schedule, and where the camp's college-aged "croo" introduce themselves. On Sunday nights, the camp holds a "Sunday Sing", in which the croo (dressed in all white) and the campers sing a variety of religious and secular songs, ending with the playing of taps on the bugle. A square dance and a talent show are also held during the week. Mail is delivered to the island every day but Sunday at noon by the M/V Sophie C during the summer and early fall weekends, and campers will often gather on the dock at this time to purchase ice cream and snacks from the boat.

Three Mile Island was named the Best Family Camp in New Hampshire by Yankee magazine in 2014.
