= Mail Call =

Mail Call may refer to:

- Mail Call (bugle call), a call which signals personnel to assemble for the distribution of mail
- Mail Call (TV series), a History Channel TV series
- Mail Call (radio program), an American radio program
- Mail Call (M*A*S*H), an episode of the TV series M*A*S*H
