= Boots and Saddles =

Boots and Saddles may refer to:

- Boots and Saddles (bugle call)
- Boots and Saddles (TV series), an American Western television series
- Boots and Saddles, 1909 film starring Hobart Bosworth
- Boots and Saddles (1916 film), 1916 film produced by B. S. Moss
- Boots and Saddles (film), a 1937 American Western film
