= Adjutant's Call =

Bugle call

Adjutant's Call

"Adjutant's Call" is a bugle call indicating that the adjutant is about to form the guard, battalion, or regiment.

"Assembly", "Adjutant's Call", and "First Sergeant's Call" are the three bugle calls that make up the "formation" category of bugle call.

The top staff is for the bugler, while the lower staff is for the drums and the cymbals.
