= N. Ronald Thunman =

US Navy admiral (1932–2024)

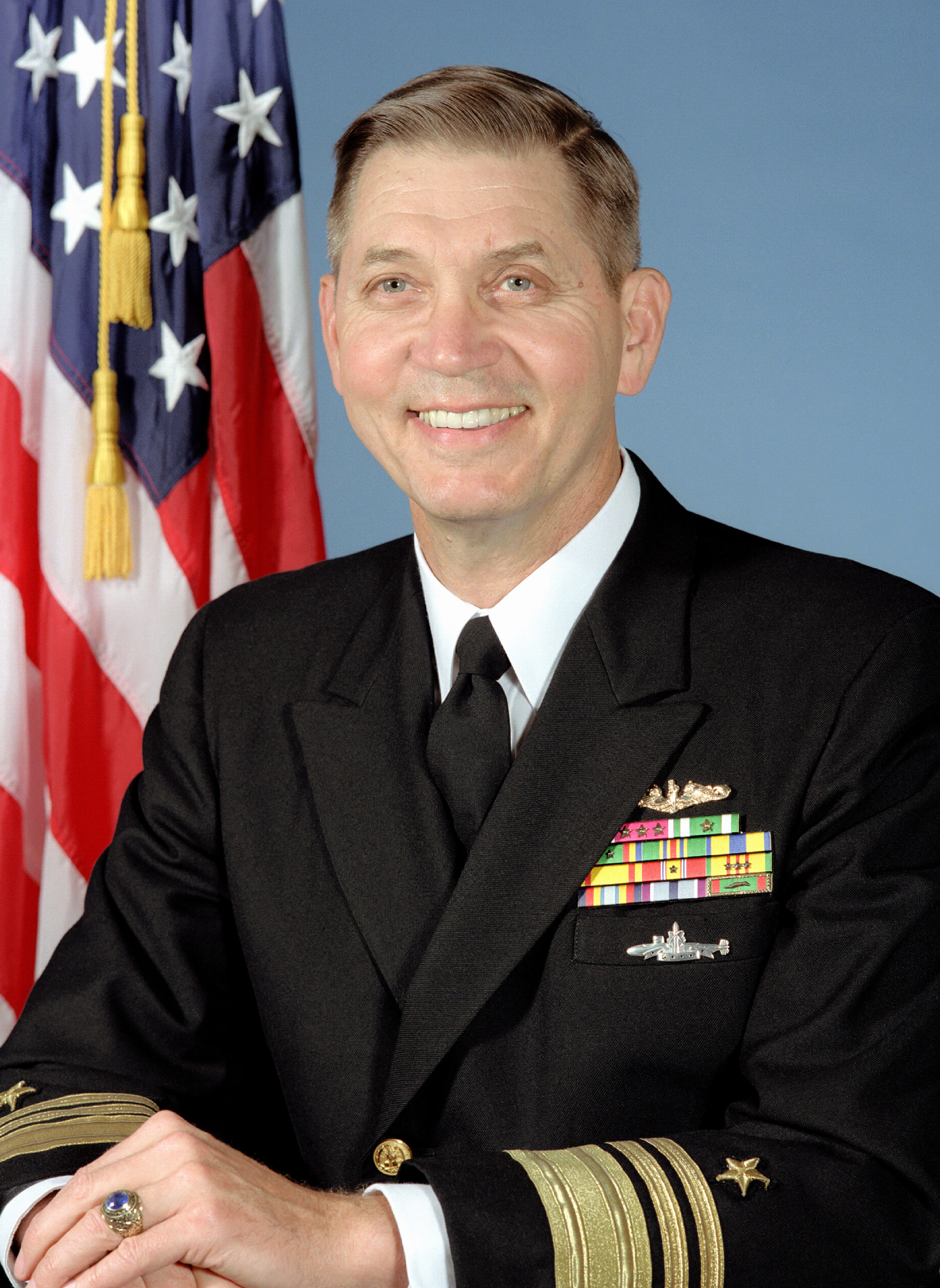
- Born: 26 February 1932; Cleveland, Ohio, US
- Died: 27 January 2024 (aged 91); Springfield, Illinois, US
- Military career
- Allegiance: United States
- Branch: United States Navy
- Service years: c. 1954–1988
- Rank: Vice admiral
- Commands: Deputy Chief of Naval Operations for Submarine Warfare, others in article text

Nils Ronald Thunman (26 February 1932 – 27 January 2024) was an American vice admiral in the United States Navy.

Thunman was the son of Swedish immigrants, and was raised in Springfield, Illinois, where he attended Springfield High School. During high school he played football, basketball and was in involved in track. After high school, he briefly attended the University of Illinois College of Civil Engineering. He graduated from the United States Naval Academy in 1954. Initially trained as a surface warfare officer, Thunman was given command of the patrol boat USS Marysville in 1957. Transferring to submarines, he became chief engineer on USS Volador. After receiving nuclear power training, Thunman served as executive officer of USS Snook (1964 to 1966), commanding officer of the attack submarine USS Plunger (1968 to 1971) and commanding officer of ballistic missile Submarine Squadron 15 based in Guam (1974 to 1976). Notable commands he later held include Commander, Submarine Forces Pacific (1979 to 1981), Deputy Chief of Naval Operations for Submarine Warfare (1981 to 1985) and Chief of Naval Education and Training (1985 to 1988). He retired in 1988.

He was Superintendent/President of the Valley Forge Military Academy and College in Wayne, Pennsylvania from 1 August 1990 to 1 September 1993. He was a member of the Springfield High School Hall of Fame and Springfield Sports Hall of Fame. He was president of CAE Electronics Corporation. He has also served in the directorship of Pinkerton Government Services, Illini Corporation and ABB Government Services Corporation.

Thunman died on 27 January 2024, at the age of 91.

Academic offices
Preceded by Alexander M. Weyand	President of Valley Forge Military Academy and College; 1990–1993	Succeeded by Virgil L. Hill, Jr.
