= Military Order of the Stars and Bars =

Nonprofit organization

- Logo of the organization
- Abbreviation: MOSB
- Formation: 1938
- Founded at: Columbia, South Carolina, U.S.
- Type: 501(c)(3) organization
- Tax ID no.: 62-1147741
- Publication: Officer's Call
- Website: Official website

The Military Order of the Stars and Bars (MOSB) is a 501(c)(3) charitable organization and lineage society that is based in Nixa, Missouri. Founded in 1938, the organization recognizes individuals whose qualifying ancestors served as commissioned officers in the Confederate States Army, Navy, or Marine Corps, or an elected or appointed public official in the years 1861–1865.

== History ==
The order was founded in 1938 in Columbia, South Carolina, at a meeting attended by 17 former Confederate officers and 47 male descendants of Confederate officers. They voted to begin a new CSA veterans society to hold annual meetings and chose the name of the "Order of the Stars and Bars".

The organization changed its name to "The Military Order of the Stars and Bars" at the 39th General Convention held in Memphis, Tennessee, in 1976. It adopted the Confederate battle flag as the official insignia of the order.

== Organization ==
The presiding officer of the general organization is called the "Commander General of the Military Order of the Stars and Bars". The current executive director (as of 2022) is Jon E. Trent. The organization awards scholarships and literary awards for books about Confederate history. The largest chapter (the most qualified members) is the Houston Chapter 5 located in Houston, Texas.

At the initiation of new members and at the beginning of meetings, members pledge to "commemorate and honor the service of leadership these men rendered" and salute the Confederate flag "with affection, reverence and undying devotion for the Cause for which it stands".

The group is in no way affiliated with the Sons of Confederate Veterans. According to the US Dept. of the Treasury: IRS the MOS&B and the SCV are two completely separate entitles as both organizations have separate 501(c)(3) Tax-Exempt EIN, separate Board of Directors, and governing documents, although some are members of both organizations.

== See also ==
- Military Order of the Loyal Legion of the United States
- Sons of Confederate Veterans
- United Confederate Veterans
