= Ronald F. Marryott =

Ronald Marryott
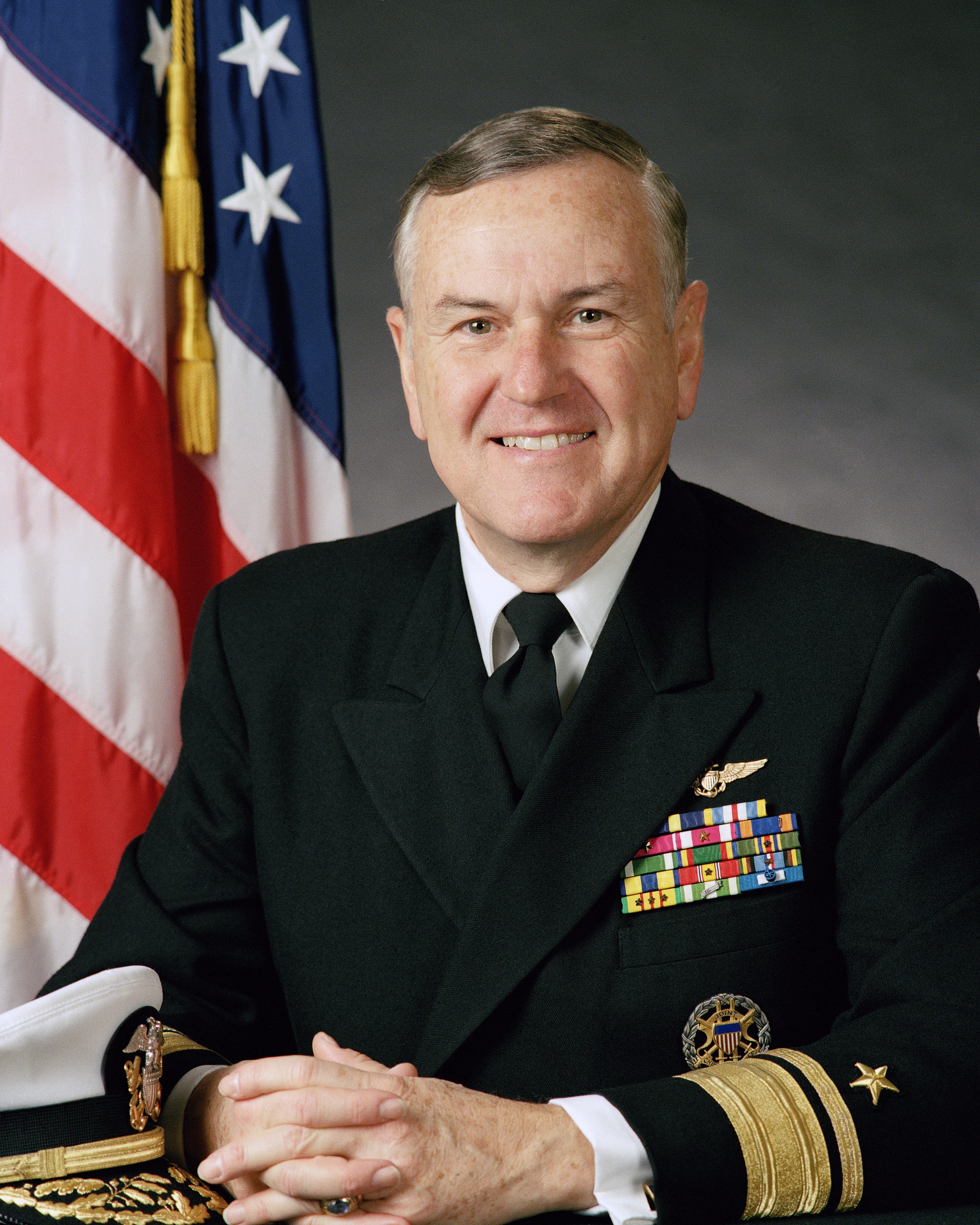
- Born: February 18, 1934; Eddystone, Pennsylvania, U.S.
- Died: June 4, 2005 (aged 71); Maryland, U.S.
- Military career
- Allegiance: United States of America
- Branch: United States Navy
- Service years: 1953–1990
- Rank: Rear Admiral
- Commands: Superintendent of the United States Naval Academy; President of the Naval War College; Iceland Defense Force; NAS Moffett Field; VP-9
- Conflicts: Vietnam War; Cold War
- Awards: Navy Distinguished Service Medal; Defense Superior Service Medal; Legion of Merit (2); Meritorious Service Medal; Air Medal; Order of the Falcon (Iceland); Ordre National du Mérite (France).

Rear Admiral Ronald Frank Marryott (February 18, 1934 – June 4, 2005) was the Superintendent of the United States Naval Academy from 1986 to 1988. He served as president and CEO of the George C. Marshall Foundation, and president and CEO of the Naval Academy Alumni Association from 1996 to 2000. He also was President of the Naval War College from 1985 to 1986.

== Early career ==
After graduating from the Academy in 1957 Marryott was designated a Naval Aviator. He flew patrol and surveillance operations in P-2V and P-3 aircraft over both the Atlantic and the Pacific and participated in the Cuban Missile Crisis blockade, he also served as Project Mercury recovery officer for the first three crewed spaceflights. In the mid-1960s at the academy, he taught naval history and the history of U.S. foreign policy, American government and politics, and international relations. Marryott saw duty in Vietnam and flew numerous Cold War missions. He went on to command Patrol Squadron 9 from 1973 to 1974 and the Naval Air Station, Moffett Field, California. He served as a Navy aviator and commanded the Iceland Defense Force. He also served seven tours in the Pentagon and was President of the Naval War College from 1985 to 1986.

== Superintendent ==
One of his greatest challenges as the academy's superintendent was reducing the dropout rate for female midshipmen. He formed a task force to investigate the high attrition rate in the 1980s and discovered that many female recruits lacked strong backgrounds in sciences or athletics, two key areas at the academy. When recruiters began seeking women with strengths in these areas, similar to their male counterparts, the attrition rate decreased.

== Decorations ==
- Navy Distinguished Service Medal
- Defense Superior Service Medal
- Legion of Merit with Gold Star
- Meritorious Service Medal
- Air Medal
- Order of the Falcon
- Ordre National du Mérite

== Later life ==
Marryott retired from active duty in 1990 and served as president and chief executive officer of the George C. Marshall Foundation before returning to Annapolis as president and chief executive officer of the academy's alumni association. He retired from the association in 2000, but remained active and served as co-chairman of the Class of '57 fundraising efforts. He was honored in 2004 as a Naval Academy Distinguished Graduate, he was a member of the class of 1957. He died on June 4, 2005, of complications from leukemia at the age of 71. Marryott was buried with full military honors at the U.S. Naval Academy Cemetery.

Academic offices
Preceded by James E. Service	President of the Naval War College; August 8, 1985 – August 12, 1986	Succeeded by John A. Baldwin, Jr.
Preceded by Charles R. Larson	Superintendent of United States Naval Academy; 1986–1988	Succeeded by Virgil L. Hill Jr.
