= Fire Call =

Bugle call which signals that there is a fire

Fire Call
Fire Call played on the bugle by a member of the United States Army Band

"Fire Call" is a bugle call which signals that there is a fire on the post or in the vicinity. The call is also used for fire drill.

== Music ==
Fire Call
