= USS Plunger (SSN-595) =

Permit-class submarine

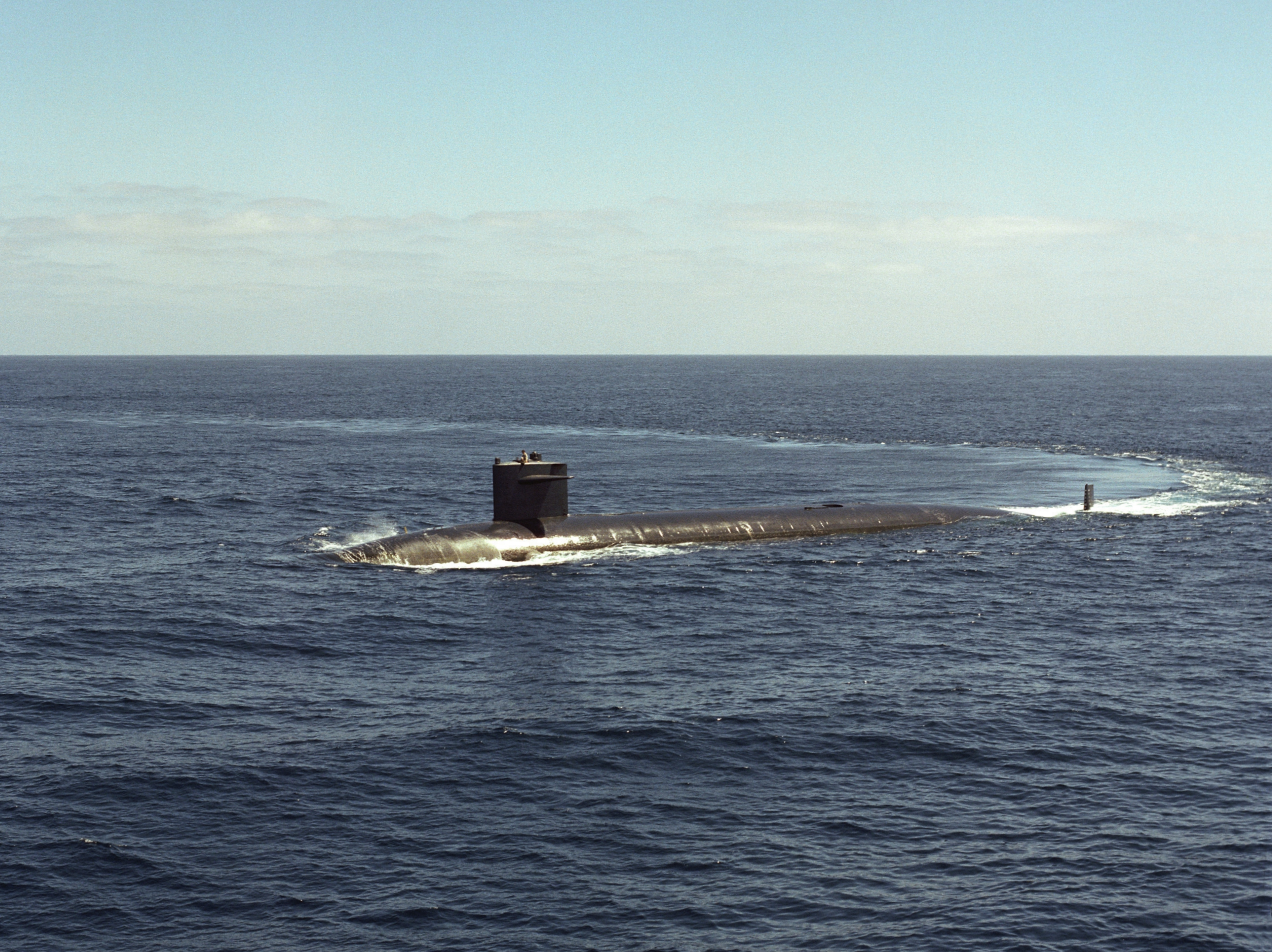
- USS Plunger (SSN-595)

History

United States
- Name: USS Plunger
- Ordered: 23 March 1959
- Builder: Mare Island Naval Shipyard, Vallejo, California
- Laid down: 2 March 1960
- Launched: 9 December 1961
- Commissioned: 21 November 1962
- Decommissioned: 2 February 1990
- Stricken: 2 February 1990
- Fate: Entered Ship-Submarine Recycling Program, 5 January 1995

General characteristics
- Class & type: Thresher/Permit-class submarine
- Displacement: 3,540 long tons (3,597 t) light; 3,700 long tons (3,759 t) surfaced; 4,300 long tons (4,369 t) submerged
- Length: 278 ft 5 in (84.86 m)
- Beam: 31 ft 8 in (9.65 m)
- Propulsion: 1 S5W PWR
- Speed: 20 knots (37 km/h; 23 mph)+
- Complement: 100 officers and men
- Armament: 4 × 21 in (533 mm) torpedo tubes

USS Plunger (SSN-595), a Permit-class submarine, was the third ship of the United States Navy to be named "plunger", meaning a diver or a daring gambler.

The contract to build her as a guided-missile submarine (SSGN) was awarded to Mare Island Naval Shipyard on 23 March 1959, but by the time her keel was laid down on 2 March 1960 she had been redesigned as an attack submarine (SSN). She was launched on 9 December 1961 (sponsored by Mrs. Clinton P. Anderson), and commissioned on 21 November 1962.

== Service history ==
Following a trip to Puget Sound on 27 November to test torpedo tubes and sound gear, Plunger departed Mare Island on 5 January 1963 for shakedown to Pearl Harbor. Plunger next was homeported at Mare Island and operated to test the performance of sonar and the fire control system. In April she changed homeport to Pearl Harbor, where she became flagship of ComSubDiv 71, on 1 April.

Continuing in a testing capacity, Plunger evaluated the most advanced class of nuclear attack submarines. Operating off the U.S. West Coast during the spring and summer, she proceeded to Wake Island on 15 September 1964 for SubRon Operational Evaluation missile firing.

At Pearl Harbor again in January 1965, Plunger was selected to demonstrate the capability of the Navy's latest ASW weapon system to Dr. Donald Hornig, Special Assistant to the President for Science and Technology. At Wake Island in May, Plunger participated in C/S-17, the SubRon Operational Training Test. In September, she prepared for WestPac deployment, which continued into mid 1966. During this deployment, Plunger conducted evaluation exercises of the AN/BQQ-1 sonar systems and traveled as far east as Okinawa and Subic Bay. She also conducted ASW exercises and executed oceanographic and port surveys.

At Pearl Harbor with SubRon 7 in 1967, Plunger operated to improve the ASW readiness of the Pacific fleet; from 6 March to 22 March, she participated in ASW exercises and later continued in advanced type-training work. During inport periods at Pearl Harbor, Plunger provided services to Fleet Training Program Pearl Harbor. Homeporting at Puget Sound the last six months of 1967, Plunger returned to Pearl Harbor on 1 February 1968.

In the latter part of 1968, while on a WestPac (Western Pacific) deployment, "Plunger" was the first nuclear ship to visit Japan at Yokosuka. Many Japanese protested the arrival of the submarine due to the power plant and fear of nuclear contamination of their waters. In January 1969, a two-month "special operations" patrol was conducted, and again in mid 1969 a "Pearl to Pearl" special operations patrol completed. It is on that patrol that the ship garnered a Navy Unit Citation for operations in the North Pacific under the command of Cdr. Nils Thunman. While on the 1968-1970 WestPac deployment ports of call were made at Yokosuka, Japan (twice); Guam, USA; Sasebo, Japan; Okinawa, Japan; Subic Bay, Philippines; Pusan, South Korea; and Hong Kong. "Plunger" was also the successful test bed for a new torpedo tube launched rocket called the "SubRoc" which was used in anti-submarine operations at a distance of up to twenty-five miles.

Commander Alvin L. Wilderman, the submarine's skipper, was washed overboard from the bridge in a storm near San Francisco on 30 November 1973. The officer of the deck and lookout were not lost.

From 1970 to 1973 she was deployed to WestPac and Vietnam. In the fall of 1973 she was conducting sea trials of the coast of California. Subsequent to those trials she returned to WestPac where she remained until 1980.

USS Plunger underwent a refit in Bremerton from 1980 to 1982 receiving several modernizations including the BQQ-5 Sonar System. She returned to San Diego after sea trials in 1983. She deployed to Westpac from January - June 1984 participating in two long operations during the deployment. She was involved in a collision with a freighter off Southern California while coming to periscope depth in early 1985 which damaged portions of her bow and sonar dome. These repairs required an unscheduled drydock during the spring of 1985.

In 1986 Plunger won the Marjorie Sterrett Battleship Fund Award, becoming the first warship to win both the Sterrett and the Arleigh Burke Awards. In this year, too, Plunger made yet another deployment to the Western Pacific, making port calls in Yokosuka, Japan and Subic Bay in the Philippines as well as visiting Hong Kong as a liberty port. During the 1986 WestPac Plunger participated in naval exercises with ships from the US, Japan, and other nations as well as a ten-week "special operation", for which it was awarded the Meritorious Unit Commendation. After returning from the WestPac Plunger conducted normal operations in the SoCal Operational Area for the next several months.

The next few years saw a number of other accomplishments - Plunger was recognized for excellence in virtually every major inspection and won the Battle Efficiency (the coveted "Battle E") award for overall combat readiness. Although aging, Plunger maintained a grueling operational schedule, spending over 60% of her time at sea and never missing a scheduled underway period - a record that many much newer submarines were unable to match.

Plunger made her final WestPac deployment in 1988, visiting Japan and the Philippines as well as Guam and Chinhae, South Korea (and making port calls in Okinawa and Hong Kong) and conducting another two-month "special operation" that garnered her a Navy Unit Commendation. This WestPac was followed by another fairly intense period of routine operations out of San Diego and, in December 1988, departure for her final "special operation" - this time keeping her crew at sea over Christmas, New Year's Day, and (to the disappointment of the crew) Super Bowl Sunday. This special operation ended with Plunger completing its final Operational Reactor Safeguards Examination (which it passed with flying colors) and giving its crew some well-earned R&R in Pearl Harbor Hawaii.

Returning to home port, Plunger was deactivated (while under the command of William Large), in commission, on 10 February 1989, decommissioned on 3 January 1990 and stricken from the Navy Register the following 2 February. Ex-Plunger entered the Nuclear Powered Ship and Submarine Recycling Program in Bremerton, Washington, on 5 January 1995 and on 8 March 1996 ceased to exist.

At the time of decommissioning Plunger was noted by the San Diego Tribune as being the most-decorated submarine in the Pacific Fleet and it was the most-decorated warship in San Diego. Through its history, Plunger was awarded four Navy Unit Commendations as well as multiple Meritorious Unit Commendations, Battle Efficiency, and other awards. And as of its retirement Plunger was the only submarine to win the Arleigh Burke Award (in 1969 under Commanding Officer Nils Thunman).
