= Charles R. Larson =

American United States Navy admiral

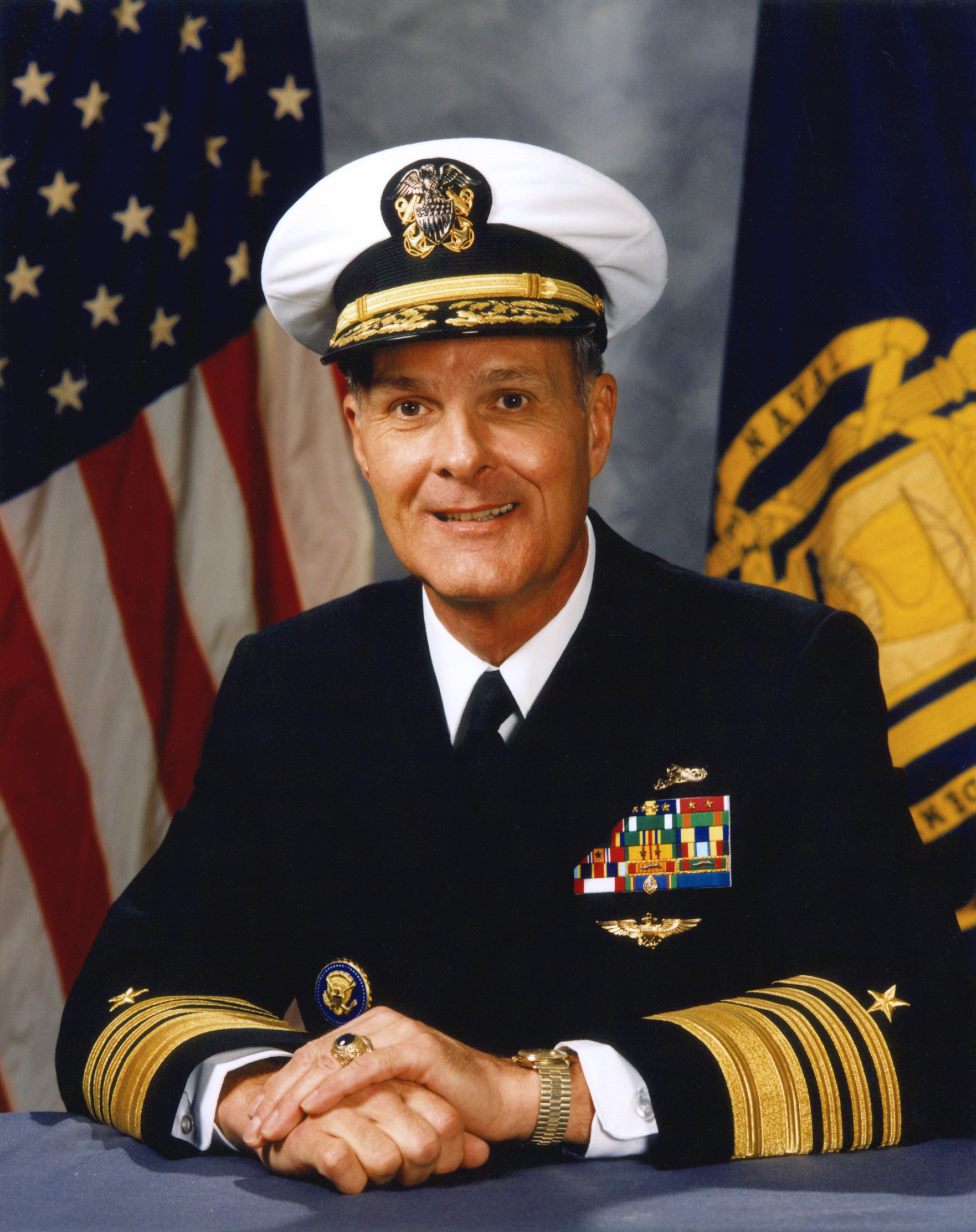
- Admiral Charles Larson as superintendent of the US Naval Academy
- Born: November 20, 1936; Sioux Falls, South Dakota, U.S.
- Died: July 26, 2014 (aged 77); Annapolis, Maryland, U.S.
- Military career
- Allegiance: United States of America
- Branch: United States Navy
- Service years: 1958–1998
- Rank: Admiral
- Units: USS Sculpin (SSN-590) (XO); USS Halibut (SSN-587) (CO); Commander, Submarine Development Group One
- Commands: Superintendent of the U.S. Naval Academy; U.S. Pacific Command
- Awards: Defense Distinguished Service Medal; Navy Distinguished Service Medal (7); Legion of Merit (3); Bronze Star; Presidential Service Badge
- Other work: Board of Directors, Northrop Grumman; Political candidate

Charles Robert Larson (November 20, 1936 – July 26, 2014) was an Admiral of the United States Navy.

== Military career ==
A 1958 graduate of the United States Naval Academy, Larson twice served as Superintendent of the U.S. Naval Academy in Annapolis, Maryland. He also served as Commander in Chief, United States Pacific Command (CINCPAC).

After graduation from the U.S. Naval Academy in 1958, Larson reported to NAS Pensacola, Florida, to enter flight training. Upon his completion, as a Naval Aviator, he reported to Attack Squadron 176 (VA-176) aboard the aircraft carrier USS Shangri-La (CVA-38), where he served until April 1963 in flying the A-1H Skyraider.

Opting to leave Naval Aviation and to transfer to the Submarine Service, he commenced nuclear power training in 1963 and then reported to the USS Nathan Hale (SSBN-623), where he qualified in submarines. His next tours of duty were on USS Nathanael Greene (SSBN-636) and USS Bergall (SSN-667).

He was the first naval officer selected as a White House Fellow and served his fellowship in 1968 as Special Assistant to the Secretary of the Interior. From 1969 to 1971, he served as Naval Aide to the President of the United States. He reported back to sea duty as executive officer of the nuclear attack submarine USS Sculpin (SSN-590). Then from 1973 to 1976, he served as commanding officer of the nuclear attack submarine USS Halibut (SSN-587). In 1976, Larson assumed duties as Commander, Submarine Development Group ONE in San Diego, California, in which he headed the Navy's worldwide deep submergence program.

He was promoted to four-star rank in February 1990 upon being assigned as Commander in Chief, U.S. Pacific Fleet, the Navy component commander in the Pacific Theater. After one year in the position, he was nominated by the President, and assumed duties, as Commander in Chief, U.S. Pacific Command.

== Awards and decorations ==
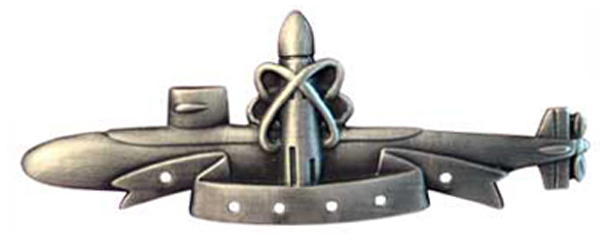

Submarine Warfare insignia
Silver SSBN Deterrent Patrol insignia with two gold stars
Defense Distinguished Service Medal	Navy Distinguished Service Medal with one gold and one silver award stars	Legion of Merit with two award stars
Bronze Star	Navy and Marine Corps Commendation Medal	Navy and Marine Corps Achievement Medal
Navy Unit Commendation with one bronze service star	Navy Meritorious Unit Commendation	Navy Expeditionary Medal
National Defense Service Medal with two service stars	Vietnam Service Medal with two service stars	Navy Sea Service Deployment Ribbon
Navy and Marine Corps Overseas Service Ribbon	Vietnam Gallantry Cross Unit Citation	Vietnam Civil Actions Medal Unit Citation
Order of the Rising Sun, Japan (class unknown)	Order of the Crown of Thailand, Knight Grand Cross	National Order of Merit (France), Knight
Naval Aviator insignia
Presidential Service Badge

- Larson has also been decorated by the governments of Japan, Thailand, France and Korea.

== Civilian career ==
Larson was a founder, director and chairman of the board of ViaGlobal Group. As of 2002, he also served on the Board of Directors of Northrop Grumman Corporation and the Board of Esterline Corporation. He also served on three corporate boards in the fields of electrical power generation and distribution, oil exploration and production and international service and construction.

In 2002, after switching parties to become a Democrat, Larson ran unsuccessfully for Lieutenant Governor of Maryland, on the ticket with Democrat Kathleen Kennedy Townsend.

Larson became an Eagle Scout in 1950 and as an adult was a recipient of the Distinguished Eagle Scout Award from the Boy Scouts of America.

His public service boards include the National Academy of Sciences Committee on International Security and Arms Control, The White House Fellows Foundation, The Board of Regents of the University System of Maryland, The Board of Trustees of the Anne Arundel Health System, Board of Directors of The Atlantic Council and as Chairman of the Board of Directors of the US Naval Academy Foundation.

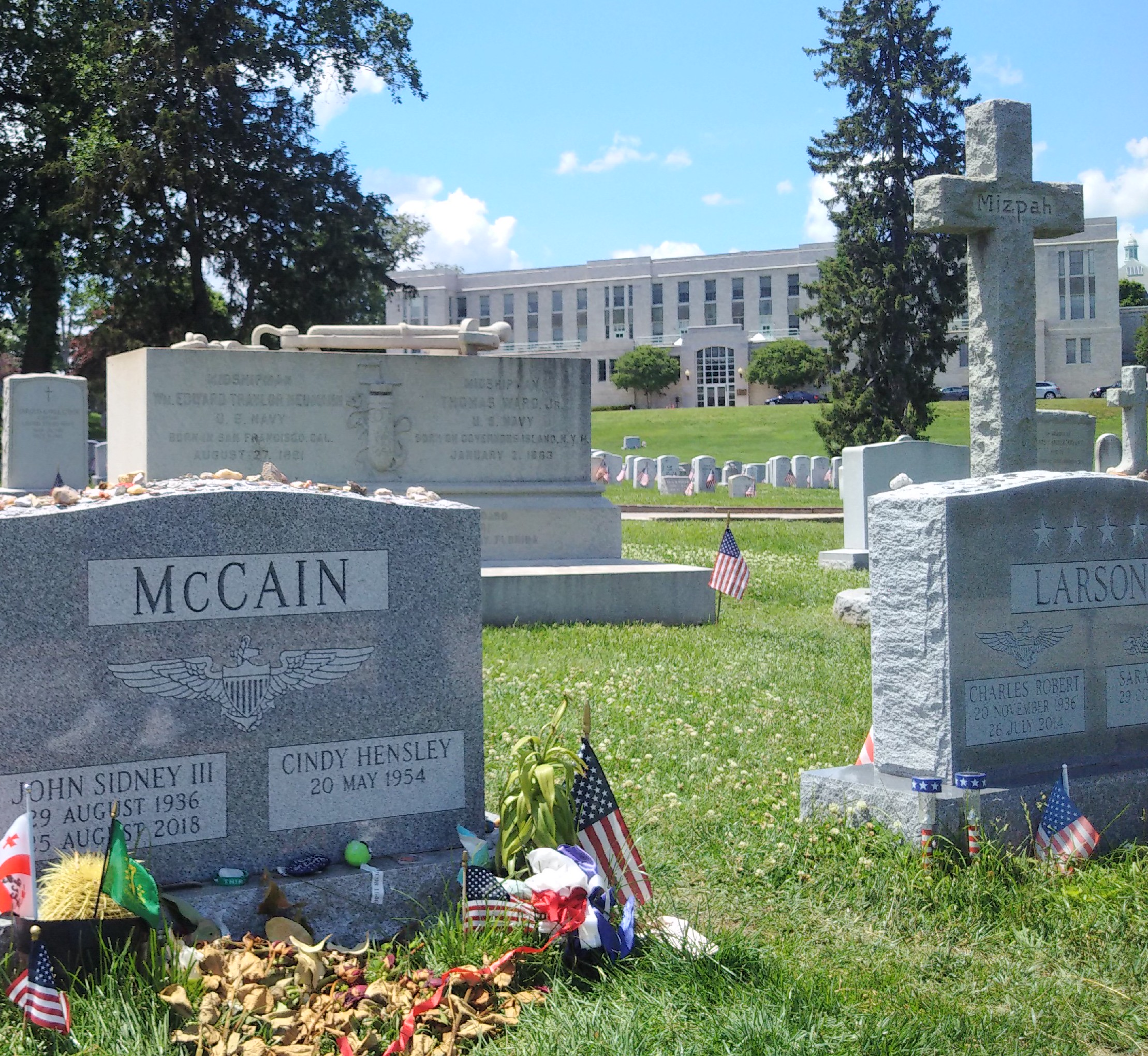
Adjacent graves of Larson and McCain at the Naval Academy Cemetery

Larson and his wife, Sally, lived in Annapolis, where he died on July 26, 2014, as a result of pneumonia, after being afflicted with leukemia for two years. He was interred at the United States Naval Academy Cemetery. Larson had reserved four plots at the Academy cemetery for himself, his classmate and close friend Senator John McCain, and their wives. McCain died on August 25, 2018 (at the age of 81), and was buried on September 2 in the plot next to Larson; the admiral's widow Sally remarked that "Chuck has his wingman back now".

=== Awards ===
Larson's civilian awards include:

- Paul Harris Fellow (Rotary International’s highest award for public service).
- VFW National Armed Forces Award (1998)
- Navy League’s Annual Leadership Award (1998)
- “All American Citizen” by the city of Omaha, Nebraska
- Omaha North High School Vikings of Distinction
- The United States Naval Academy Alumni Association’s Distinguished Graduate Award

== See also ==
- List of superintendents of the United States Naval Academy

Academic offices
Preceded by Edward C. Waller	Superintendent of United States Naval Academy; 1983–1986	Succeeded by Ronald F. Marryott
Preceded by Thomas Lynch	Superintendent of United States Naval Academy; 1994–1998	Succeeded by John R. Ryan
