= Church Call =

Bugle call signaling religious services or funerals

"Church Call" is a bugle call which signals that religious services are about to begin. The call may also be used to announce the formation of a funeral escort.
