= Attention (bugle call) =

Bugle call warning troops they are about to be called to attention

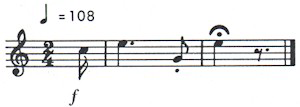
This is taken from the British Alarm, at which call the troops turned out under arms.

"Attention" is a bugle call sounded as a warning that troops are about to be called to attention.

"Attention" was also used for custom automobile horns.
