= Fatigue Call =

"Fatigue Call" is a bugle call which signals all designated personnel to report for fatigue duty.
