= Alfred A. Sanelli =

United States Army general

Brigadier General Alfred A. Sanelli, Pennsylvania Guard (May 1, 1921 – December 12, 2005). (Lieutenant Colonel, United States Army.) Sanelli was a graduate of Valley Forge Military Academy, Class of 1939. Following Valley Forge, he attended the University at Buffalo, but his education was interrupted in 1942 with the outbreak of World War II. He returned to college in 1946 and received a bachelor's degree in English. He later earned a master's degree from Columbia University.

Sanelli was a member of the English Department at Valley Forge in 1947 and returned to active duty in 1948. During his US Army career, BG Sanelli served in various capacities as a commander and staff officer, stateside and overseas. In 1952 he was assigned as assistant professor of military science at the University of Wisconsin. In 1958 he was appointed assistant professor of English at West Point. His last Army assignment before retiring in 1965 was as professor of military science at Valley Forge.

After his retirement, Sanelli was an associate professor of English at West Chester University. In 1967 he returned to Valley Forge as the dean of the academy, with the rank of brigadier general, Pennsylvania Guard, a position he held for 17 years before assuming his post as Chaplain and assistant to the president in 1984. During that period he was also the dean of the college for two years. In addition, he served as an adjunct instructor of First Class English in the academy and was an adjunct professor of ethics at the college.

As a cadet, Sanelli was the company commander of B Company and was class president in his First and Second Class years. He was a member of the Honor Council and received the order of Anthony Wayne.

In 1971 he was cited as a Leader in American Secondary School Education. In 1981 he was presented with the Distinguished Alumnus Award and at Homecoming 1999, he received the Valley Forge George Washington Award.
