= Adjutant =

Military position or rank

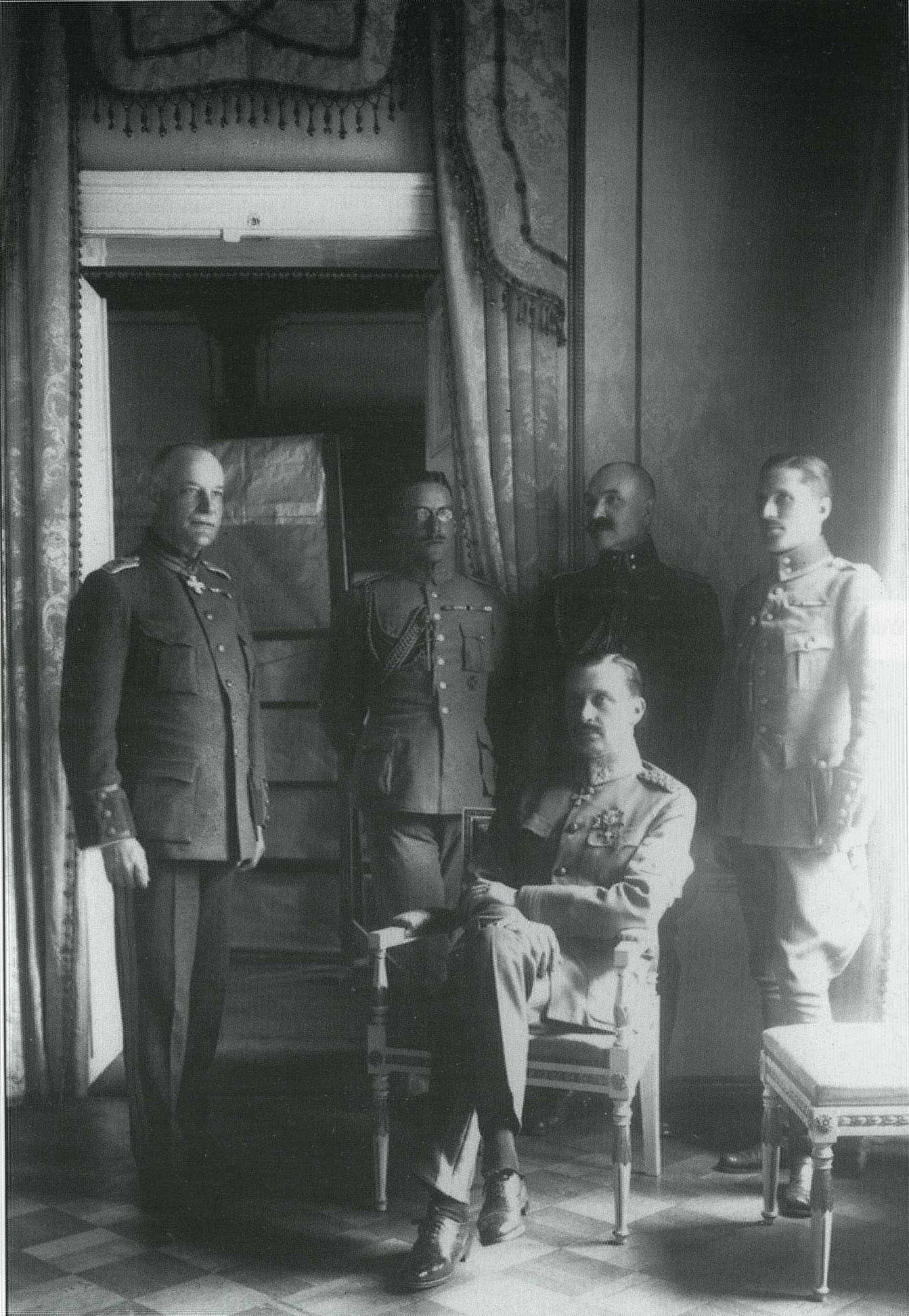
C. G. E. Mannerheim as regent of Finland (sitting) and his adjutants (from the left) Lt.Col. Kasimir Lilius, Cap. Heikki Kekoni, Lt. Akseli Gallen-Kallela, Ensign John Rosenbröijer

Adjutant is a military appointment given to an officer who assists the commanding officer with unit administration, mostly the management of "human resources" in an army unit. The term adjudant is used in French-speaking armed forces as a non-commissioned officer rank similar to a master sergeant or warrant officer but is not equivalent to the role or appointment of an adjutant.

An adjutant general is commander of an army's administrative services.

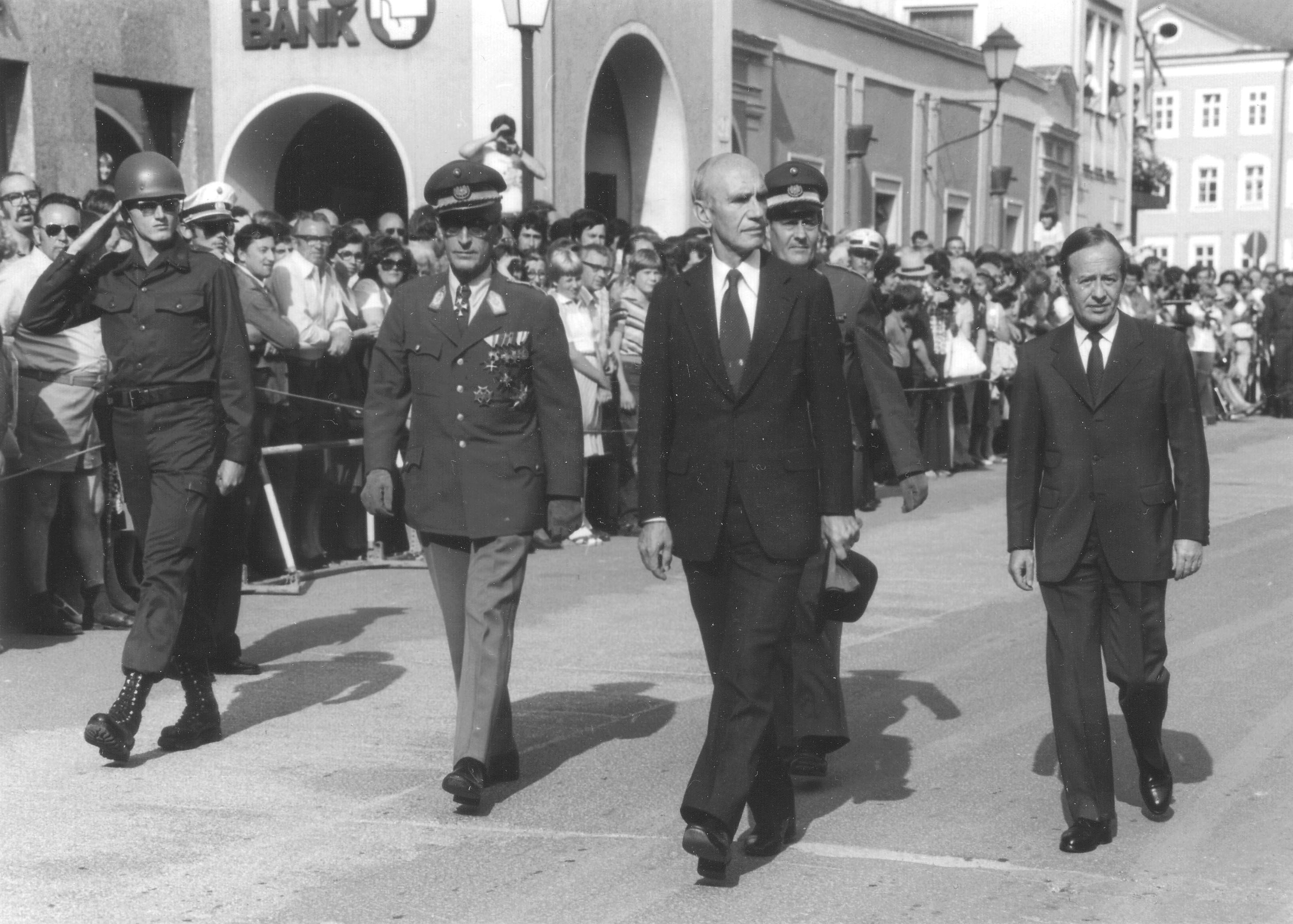
President of Austria Rudolf Kirchschläger and commander Karl von Wohlgemuth; the president's adjutant is in the background

== Etymology ==
Adjutant comes from the Latin adiutāns, present participle of the verb adiūtāre, frequentative form of adiuvāre 'to help'; the Romans actually used adiūtor for the noun.

== Military appointment ==
In various uniformed hierarchies, the term is used for a number of functions, but generally as a principal aide to a commanding officer.

A regimental adjutant, garrison adjutant etc. is a staff officer who assists the commanding officer of a regiment, battalion or garrison in the details of regimental, garrison or similar duty. In United States Army squadrons, the adjutant is often the officer-in-charge (OIC) of the administrative platoon.

=== UK and other Commonwealth countries ===
In the British Army, an adjutant (adj; sometimes actually referred to as this) is usually a senior captain, and sometimes a major. As the colonel's personal staff officer, he was once in charge of all the organisation, administration and discipline for a battalion or regiment, although now the bulk of administrative work is carried out by the regimental administrative officer (RAO). Until the 1970s the adjutant was also the regimental operations officer, although this job is now filled by a separate officer. In the British Army, adjutants are given field rank and as such are senior by appointment to all other captains, ranking just behind the majors. Unlike the RAO (who is an officer of the Adjutant General's Corps), the adjutant is a member of the corps or regiment of which their unit is a part.

The adjutant's job is not solely a 'backroom' one, since he usually accompanies the colonel—Captain David Wood, the adjutant of 2 Para, was killed in action at the Battle of Goose Green, for example. Normally, in a British Infantry battalion, the adjutant controls the battle whilst the CO commands it. As such, the adjutant is usually a person of significant influence within their battalion. In the Foot Guards, the adjutant of the unit in charge of Trooping the Colour is one of three officers on horseback.

In many Commonwealth armies, the adjutant performs much the same role as in the British Army. There is no RAO position within the Australian or Canadian armies, where an adjutant performs the administrative role with the assistance of a chief clerk, who usually has a rank of warrant officer class two.

=== Canada ===
In the Canadian Armed Forces, the term adjutant is used in common with other English-speaking armies, and the corresponding French term is Capitaine-adjudant.

=== Bangladesh ===
The Bangladesh Army has the appointment of adjutant which is similar to that in old British system. Though the authorization is of captain rank, often a lieutenant can be appointed as adjutant, although a lieutenant posted as adjutant will not receive the staff pay as a captain with same appointment. Resaldar Adjutant (RA), or warrant officer adjutant (WOA), is a position unique to the Bangladesh Army. He is a warrant officer who acts as deputy to the adjutant. In spite of this, the WOA or RA does not have any authority in official correspondences. His main role is the transmission and the execution of the adjutant's orders in all companies. On all formal parades, the standard procedure is for the squadron/company sergeant major to first report to the RA/WOA, and the RA/WOA in turn to report to the Adjutant.

=== India ===
The Indian Army has the position of adjutant, which is based on the old British system. The adjutants in most cases are captains but in some cases hold the rank of major (especially in Regimental Centres). Subedar Adjutant (SA) is a position unique to the Bangladesh Army and Indian Army. He is a subedar who acts as deputy to the adjutant. On all formal parades, the standard procedure is for the company havildar major to first report to the subedar adjutant, and the subedar adjutant in turn to report to the adjutant. In the British Indian Army, the equivalent position was the jemadar adjutant, who held the lower rank of jemadar.

=== Pakistan ===
The Pakistan Army has the appointment of adjutant which is similar to that in old British system. Adjutants in the Pak Army are mostly captains and sometimes lieutenants. The Pak Army also holds the rank of junior adjutant (JA), who works as an aide to the adjutant and is of the rank of subedar, an equivalent rank to warrant officer or sergeant in Western armies.

The regimental adjutant is also commander of regimental provost and assist commanding officer in all matters pertaining to discipline, training and operational planning.

=== United States ===
In the US Army, historically the adjutant was generally a member of the branch or regiment of the parent unit (e.g. in an infantry battalion, the adjutant was usually an infantry officer). In 2008, as a result of the Army's transformation, the Human Resources community implemented the Personnel Services Delivery Redesign, which recoded the adjutant position in battalions to an officer from the Adjutant General's Corps. The adjutant general at the battalion-level is generally a junior captain or senior first lieutenant and, in conjunction with the S-1 section, manages the administrative functions of the unit. The adjutant also works closely with the unit's command sergeant major for awards ceremonies, traditional ceremonial functions, casual events (hails and farewells), evaluation reports, and management of correspondence and other secretarial functions. Based upon the needs of the commander, an adjutant typically from the combat arms branches may still be specially appointed in modern-day to assist a brigade commander to ease his/her burden of command.

There is a bugle call announcing the adjutant that is still used in military ceremonies today.

In the United States Marine Corps, the adjutant serves as the senior administrator for their unit, and is the OIC (officer in charge) of the S-1 or admin shop.

The USMC MOS handbook says:

Adjutants coordinate administrative matters for Marine Corps staff sections and external agencies at the staff level. They ensure that every Marine in their command has administrative resources both for day-to-day tasks and long-term career progression. Adjutants supervise the execution of administrative policies. They receive and route correspondence, preparing responses to any special correspondence. They also manage their unit's legal matters and monitor fitness reports, among other administrative duties.

== Military rank ==
=== France ===
In the French Army, Air Force and Gendarmerie, the ranks of adjudant (premier maître in the navy) and adjudant-chef (maître-principal in the navy) may be considered equivalent to Commonwealth warrant officer ranks. These ranks are senior to the rank of sergeant and junior to the rank of major. (Note: Major is the senior NCO rank in the French military, shortened from adjudant-major.) Like the officers, the adjudants are entitled to the mon before their rank, as in "mon adjudant". (Note: Mon is shortened from monsieur, similar to the "sir" in Anglo-Saxon military tradition.)

	OR-9		OR-8	
	Army	Air force	Army	Air force
Shoulder				
Camouflage				
French	Adjudant-chef		Adjudant	
English translation	Chief Adjutant		Adjutant	

In France, each corps has a colour (gold for most infantry units, artillery, the air force and engineers, or silver for most cavalry units, transport and materiel corps). A French adjutant wears a band, with thin red line, in the opposite colour to that of his corps. A chief adjutant wears a band, with thin red line, in the colour of his corps. In order to distinguish an adjutant from a chief adjutant it is necessary to know the arm's colour.

In cavalry units, adjudants and adjudants-chefs are addressed by tradition as "lieutenants".

=== Netherlands ===
Within the Netherlands Armed Forces the seniormost non-commissioned officer rank across all branches is called adjudant-onderofficier. The rank is both rated OR-8 and OR-9 within the NATO rank structure, however, it is only after 3 years as an adjudant-onderofficier that there is advancement to OR-9.

=== Gallery ===
Adjudant
(Arabic: مساعد, romanized: Mosa'id)
(Algerian Land Forces)

Adjudant
(Belgian Land Component)

Adjudant
(Benin Army)

Adjudant
(Burkina Faso Ground Forces)

Adjudant
(Burundi Army)

Adjudant
(Cameroon Ground Forces)

Adjudant
(Central African Ground Forces)

Adjudant
(Comorian Army)

Adjudant
(Land Forces of the DR Congo)

Adjudant
(Djiboutian Army)

Adjudant
(French Army)

Adjudant
(Gabonese Army)

Adjudant
(Guinea Ground Forces)

Adjudant
(Ivory Coast Ground Forces)

Adjudant
(Luxembourg Army)

Adjudant
(Madagascar Ground Forces)

Adjudant
(Malian Army)

Adjudant
(Royal Moroccan Army)

Adjudant-onderofficier
(Royal Netherlands Army)

Adjudant
(Niger Army)

Adjudant
(Senegalese Army)

Adjudant-onderofficier
(Suriname Army)

Adjudant
(Togolese Army)

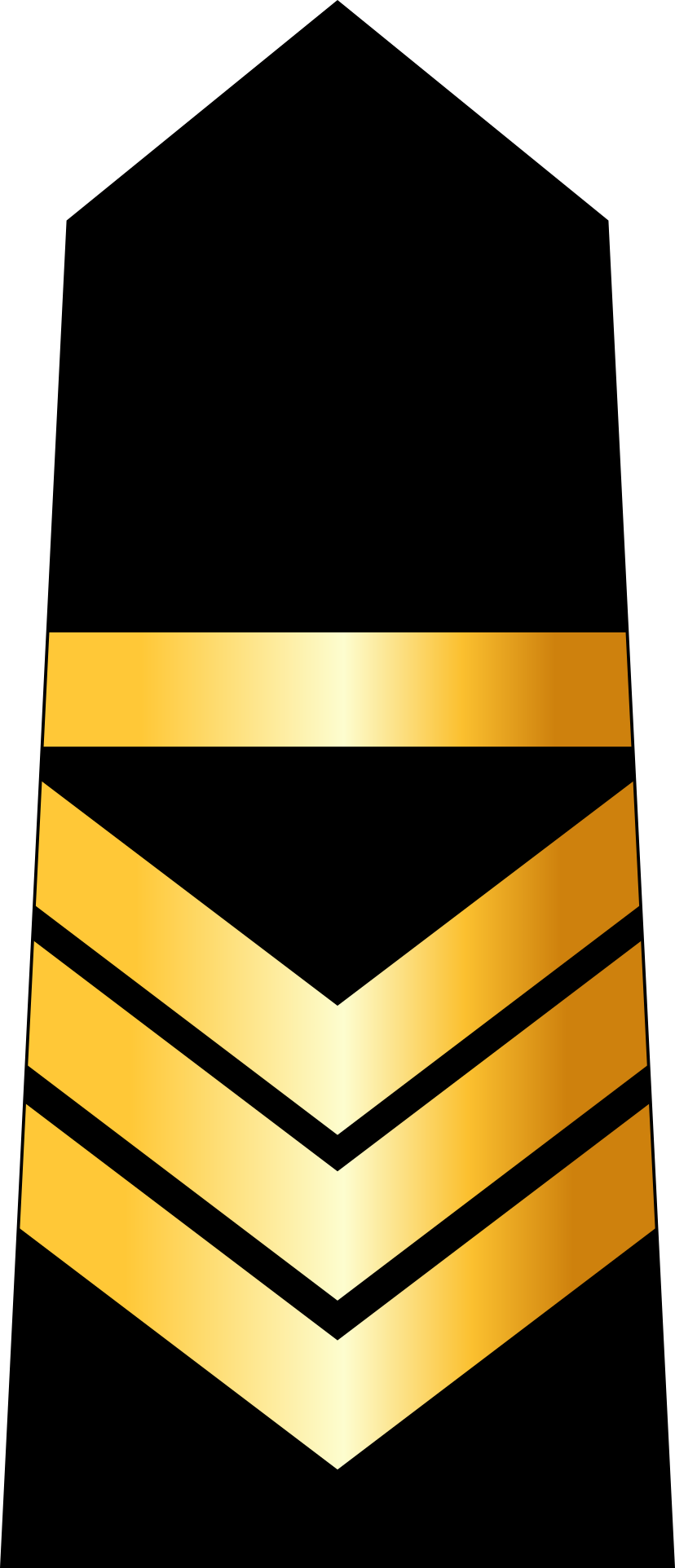
Adjudant
(Arabic: وكيل, romanized: Wakil)
(Tunisian Army)

== Adjutant general ==
A Swedish Army adjutant general in 1807

An adjutant general is both a rank and a role that may represent the principal staff officer of an army; through the adjutant general, the commanding general receives communications and issues military orders. In the United States, the adjutant general is the chief military officer of the United States National Guard units in any one of the American states. This use of the term reflects the early history of the United States, because of which each of the 50 states has partial sovereignty, including the right to maintain military forces; the Army National Guard and Air National Guard are state units that can be called to federal duty in case of national emergency.

== See also ==
- S1
- Aide-de-camp
- Equerry
- Batman
