= Thomas Lynch (admiral) =

United States Navy officer

Thomas C. Lynch
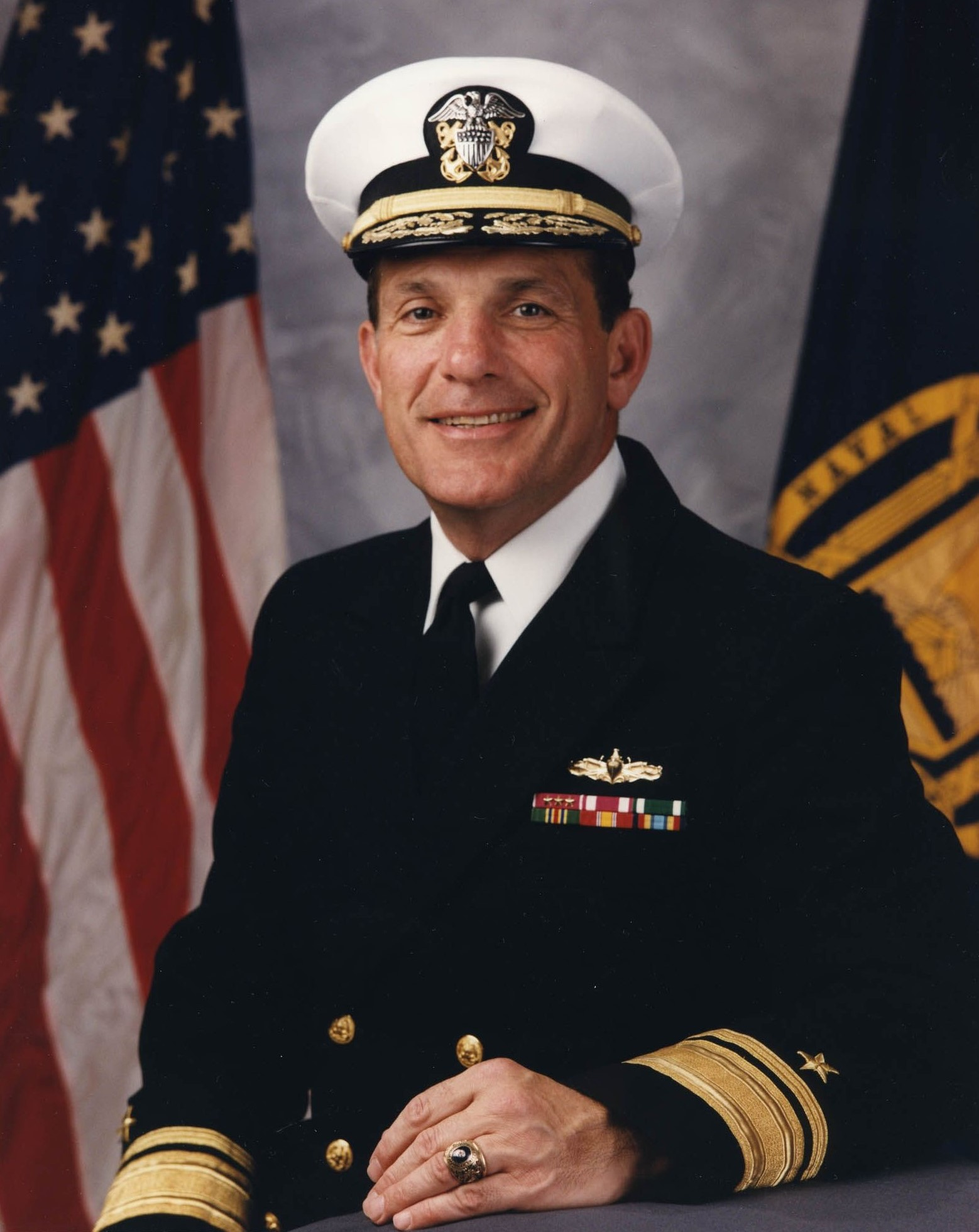
- Born: April 7, 1942 (age 84); Lima, Ohio, U.S.
- Military career
- Allegiance: United States
- Branch: United States Navy
- Service years: c.1964–1995
- Rank: Rear Admiral
- Commands: Superintendent of the United States Naval Academy, others below
- Awards: Navy Distinguished Service Medal, Legion of Merit (4), Meritorious Service Medal

Thomas Charles Lynch (born April 7, 1942) is a retired Rear Admiral in the United States Navy.

He was Superintendent of the United States Naval Academy in Annapolis, Maryland from June 15, 1991 to August 1, 1994, when he was reassigned following a cheating scandal.

== Early life ==
Born in Lima, Ohio, the son of Rodney and Marie Lynch, he is a 1964 graduate of the United States Naval Academy.

He was a three time football letter winner and captained the 1963 Navy team. He also boxed as a midshipman.

== Career ==
Lynch also held the command of the Eisenhower Battle Group during the course of Operation Desert Shield, and later served as the Navy’s chief of legislative affairs.

He retired in 1995, in the position of Director of the Navy Staff at the Pentagon in Washington, D.C.

Lynch has remained active in the private sector through his work with NewDay USA, a mortgage lending company that focuses on services for military veterans. He has served as chairman of the board and has appeared as a spokesperson for the company in outreach and informational campaigns related to VA home loans. In addition to those roles, he is co-chairman of the NewDay USA Foundation, which supports educational and scholarship programs for children of servicemembers and veterans.

== Personal life ==
Lynch was married to Kathleen Quinn and has three children. His wife died on May 18, 2010.

He married to Sandy Brock in 2023.

His younger brother, Jim, played in the National Football League.

Academic offices
Preceded by Virgil L. Hill Jr.	Superintendent of United States Naval Academy; 1991–1994	Succeeded by Charles R. Larson
