= Sunset (bugle call) =

Bugle call

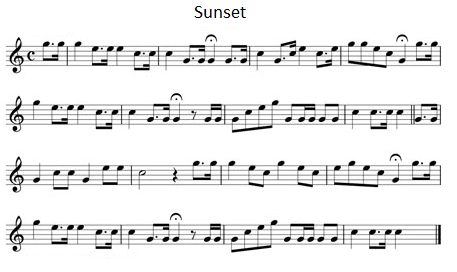
- Notation of the bugle call.
- Genre: Bugle call
- Published: 1932

"Sunset", also known as the "Retreat Call", is a bugle call played in United Kingdom and British Commonwealth countries to signal the end of the official military day. In common with all bugle calls, it consists only of notes from a single overtone series. This allows it to be playable on a bugle or equivalently on a trumpet without moving the valves.

The call is regularly heard performed in an arrangement for full military band by Captain A.C. Green (1888–1974), who was Director of the Royal Naval School of Music's Junior Wing on the Isle of Man.

The arrangement was composed aboard HMS Queen Elizabeth in response to Admiral Fisher's desire for a "spectacular show" and was first performed in 1932 by the Massed Bands and Bugles of the Mediterranean Fleet. The Sunset call is now a regular part of the Royal Marines' "Beating Retreat" ceremony, the call's melody also gives its name to "Sunset Parades" given in commemoration of former military conflicts. It is traditional to stand for the performance of the piece.

Trumpet & Bugle Calls for the British Army marks this call for Royal Artillery units only. The call would then be sounded on an E♭ Cavalry Trumpet.
