= Payday March =

"Payday March" is a bugle march. The first strain, repeated, also serves as "Pay Call", a bugle call to announce that the troops will be paid.

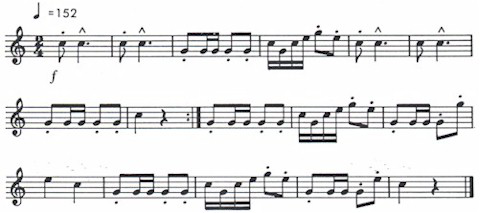
