= Recall (bugle call) =

Recall
Recall played on the bugle by a member of the United States Army Band

"Recall" is a bugle call used to signal to soldiers that duties or drills are to cease, or to indicate that a period of relaxation should end. Outside of a military context, it is used to signal when a game should end, such as a game of capture the flag among scouts.

== History ==
Like other bugle calls, "recall" is a short tune that originated as a military signal announcing scheduled and certain non-scheduled events on a military installation, battlefield, or ship. Historically bugle calls indicated the change in daily routines of camp. A defining feature of a bugle call is that it consists only of notes from a single overtone series, a requirement if it is to be playable on a bugle, or on a trumpet without moving the valves.
