= Drill Call =

Drill Call
Drill Call played on the bugle by a member of the United States Army Band

"Drill Call" is a bugle call which sounds as a warning to turn out for drill.
