= Virgil L. Hill Jr. =

American naval admiral (1938–2024)

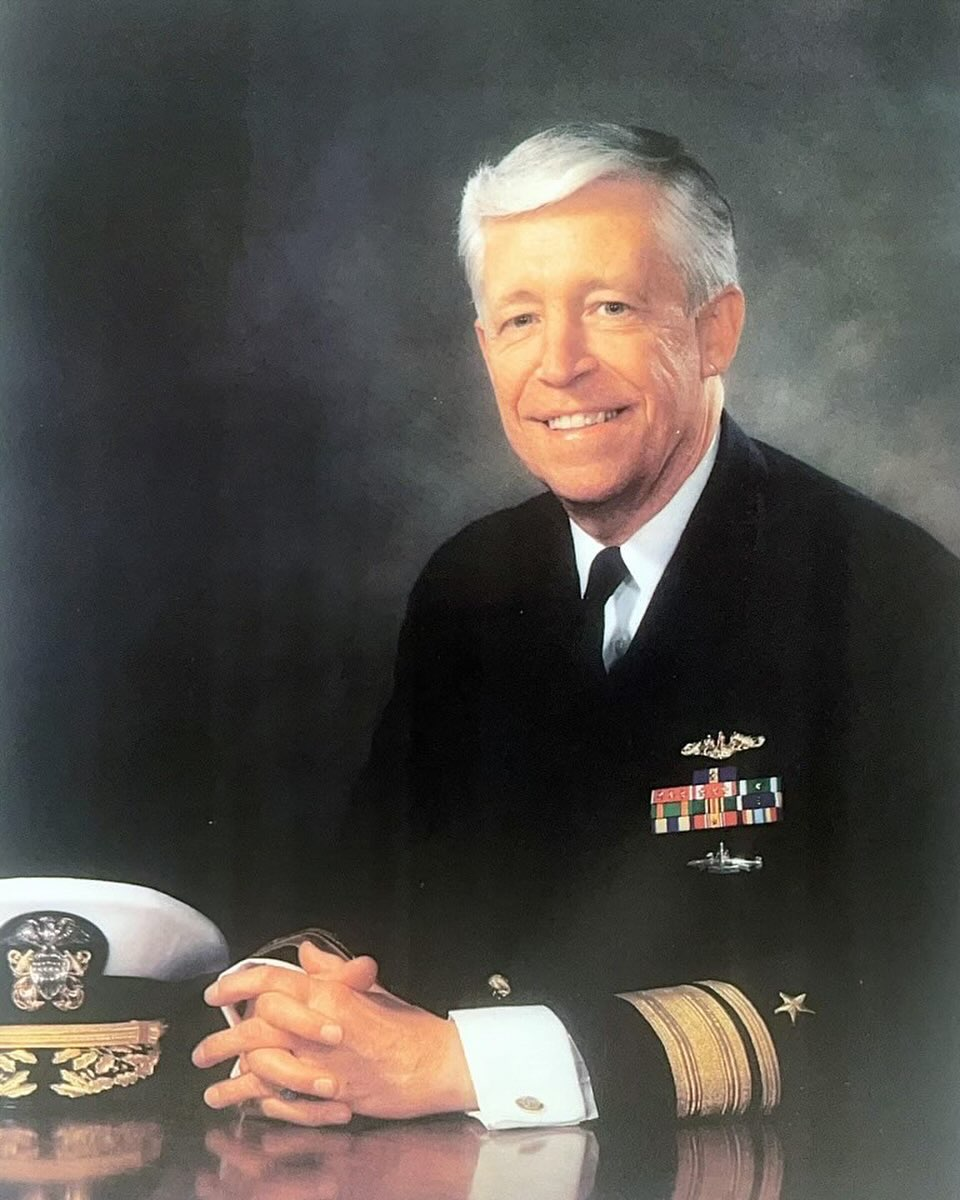
- Hill in 1988
- Born: April 2, 1938; Cleveland County, North Carolina, U.S.
- Died: September 6, 2024 (aged 86); Willow Street, Pennsylvania, U.S.
- Alma mater: United States Naval Academy (BS)
- Military career
- Allegiance: United States
- Branch: United States Navy
- Service years: 1961–1993
- Rank: Rear admiral
- Commands: Superintendent of the United States Naval Academy, others below

Virgil Lusk Hill Jr. (April 2, 1938 – September 6, 2024) was a rear admiral in the United States Navy. He served as Superintendent of the United States Naval Academy in Annapolis, Maryland from August 18, 1988, to June 15, 1991.

Hill attended Iowa State University for one year on a Navy Reserve Officer Training Corps scholarship prior to his four years at the United States Naval Academy, where he graduated with distinction in 1961, receiving his diploma from President John F. Kennedy. He was a candidate for a Rhodes Scholarship. Following graduation he went directly into the Nuclear Submarine Service.

After retiring from the U.S. Navy in 1993, he served as president of Valley Forge Military Academy and College in Wayne, Pennsylvania, before retiring seven years later. He was then asked to teach Leadership and Ethics in the Business School at Villanova University, where he taught for two years.

== Naval Academy Controversy ==
In May 1990, a female midshipman named Gwen Dreyer was handcuffed to a urinal and jeered by a group of male upperclassmen. The incident occurred at the Naval Academy, where Rear Adm. Hill served as superintendent from 1988 to 1991. While Hill was not personally involved in the act, his handling of this and other misconduct scandals at the academy led to criticism of his leadership. Hill dismissed this event as "hijinks". The widespread scrutiny from the Dreyer incident ultimately led to Hill's removal from the superintendent role and his early retirement from the Navy.

== Death ==
Hill died from complications of dementia at his home in Willow Street, Pennsylvania, on September 6, 2024. He was 86.

Academic offices
Preceded by Ronald F. Marryott	Superintendent of United States Naval Academy; 1988–1991	Succeeded by Thomas C. Lynch
