= Karl von Wohlgemuth =

- Born: 15 September 1917
- Died: 29 August 1983 (aged 65)
- Military career
- Allegiance: Nazi Germany (Austria) Second Austrian Republic
- Branch: Austrian Armed Forces
- Rank: General
- Conflicts: World War II
- Awards: Knight's Cross of the Iron Cross

Karl von Wohlgemuth (15 September 1917 – 29 August 1983) was a general in the Austrian Armed Forces. During World War II, he served as an officer in the Wehrmacht and was a recipient of the Knight's Cross of the Iron Cross of Nazi Germany.

== Awards and decorations ==
- Knight's Cross of the Iron Cross on 30 September 1944 as Major and commander of Divisions-Füsilier-Bataillon 1
