= Officer's Call =

"Officers' Call" is a bugle call used by the United States Armed Forces and the Boy Scouts of America, which calls officers to gather at a designated place.
