= Mess Call =

Bugle call signalling time to go to the mess hall

Mess Call
Mess Call played on the bugle by a member of the United States Army Band

"Mess Call" is a bugle call which signals time to go to the mess hall.

"Mess Call" is associated with the following lyrics:

Soupy, soupy, soupy, without a single bean:
Coffee, coffee, coffee, without a speck of cream:
Porky, porky, porky, without a streak of lean.
