= First call =

Bugle call

First call
First call played on the bugle by a member of the United States Army Band

"First Call" is a bugle call used in America primarily in three contexts: the U.S. Army; the U.S. Navy; and horse racing.

== U.S. Army use ==
At a U.S. ground military installation (mainly the U.S. Army and the U.S. Air Force), it is a pre-reveille "courtesy" signal, sounded around 05:50, originally to assemble the trumpeters to deliver the reveille that is delivered at 06:00. Some locations also sound it a few minutes before "Retreat" (lowering the flag at the end of the day).

In other military contexts, it is used (e.g., 5 minutes) before sounding "Assembly" for any particular formation.

In contemporary practice, Army bugle calls are typically performed only on weekdays (Monday through Friday), with the First Call at 06:25, the Reveille at 06:30, a Retreat (To the Color) at 17:00, and finally Taps at 21:00.

== U.S. Navy use ==
On ships of the U.S. Navy, "First Call" is sounded at 07:55, five minutes ahead of "Morning Colors" (raising the national ensign), and 5 minutes before "Evening Colors" (lowering the national ensign). In the absence of a bugle, the word is passed: "First call, first call to colors."

The same ceremony takes place on shore establishments, but not on ships underway.

== Horse racing ==
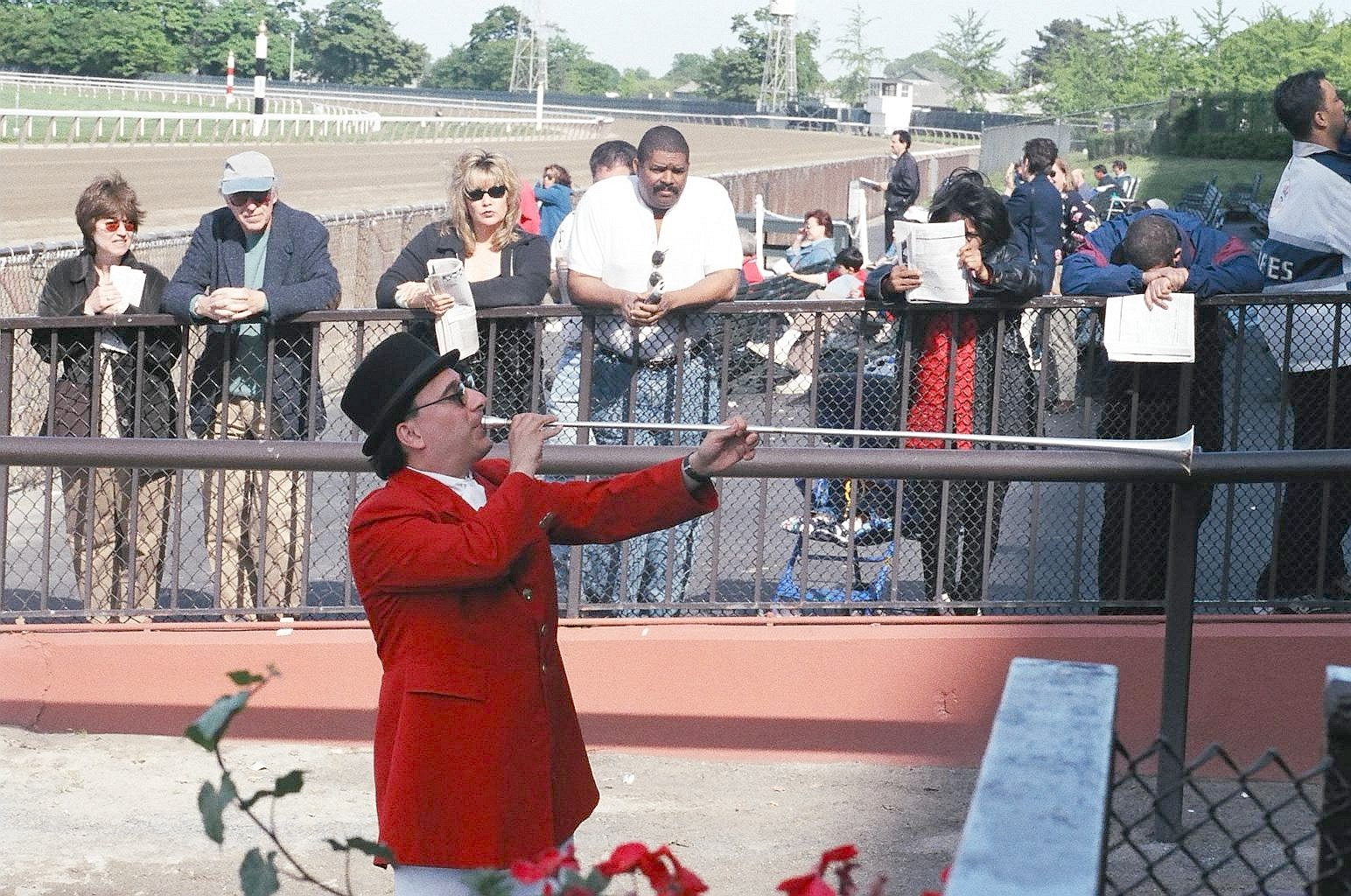
Bugler at Belmont Park racetrack

At a horse race, "First call" is a signal that all mounts should be at the paddock exit in order to proceed to the track to begin the post parade. This started to be used at horse races before the 1860s.

The tune is usually sounded by a bugler five to ten minutes before the scheduled start time of the race.

The call serves a similar purpose in dog racing. When "First call" is used for this purpose, it is usually referred to as the "Call to the Post".

== Score ==
=== Japanese horse racing ===
In Japan, a "fanfare" is played or performed just before the actual race starts, rather than five to ten minutes before, in order to proceed to the gates. The practice started in 1959, when the Japan Racing Association started playing Bahn Frei! by Eduard Strauss after Radio Nikkei started to use the song for their radio broadcast to signify listeners that the race was about to start.

The current fanfares adopted by the JRA were introduced in the late 1980s, with Koichi Sugiyama composing the fanfares used in Tokyo and Nakayama Racecourses.

To date, the JRA uses 21 fanfares depending on the racecourse and the race grade that is about to start.

"First call" is also used as a fanfare at Funabashi Racecourse, a regional horse race track in Japan.

== External multimedia ==
- MP3 file, RealMedia file, FAS.org
