= Guard Mount =

Guard mount may refer to two things: The first is the actual forming (mounting) of a military security group called the Guard; the second is the bugle call which was used to signal the formation of the group.

== Military formation ==
Guard mount is a pre-shift official formation among designated United States Air Force Security Forces or United States Army Military Police Corps members. This meeting is usually held after all security personnel have "armed up" or received their weapons and equipment for the shift. During the formation, the senior NCO (non-commissioned officer) such as the flight leader (known as the flight chief) or the Flight Sergeant will discuss topics such as current unit, base or other service (air force or army) level news, current terrorism warnings or military intelligence, and weapons, vehicle and ground safety. Members also will be inspected and assessed on their appearance, uniform and checked for required equipment. When held in a deployed combat threat environment, guard mount is somewhat akin to US Army pre-combat checks and pre-combat inspections, PCC and PCI respectively.

== Bugle call ==
"Guard Mount" is a bugle call which sounds as a warning that the guard is about to be assembled for guard mount.
