= Mail Call (bugle call) =

Mail Call
Mail Call played on the bugle by a member of the United States Army Band

"Mail Call" is a bugle call which signals personnel to assemble for the distribution of mail.
