= Fatigue duty =

Labor assigned to military men

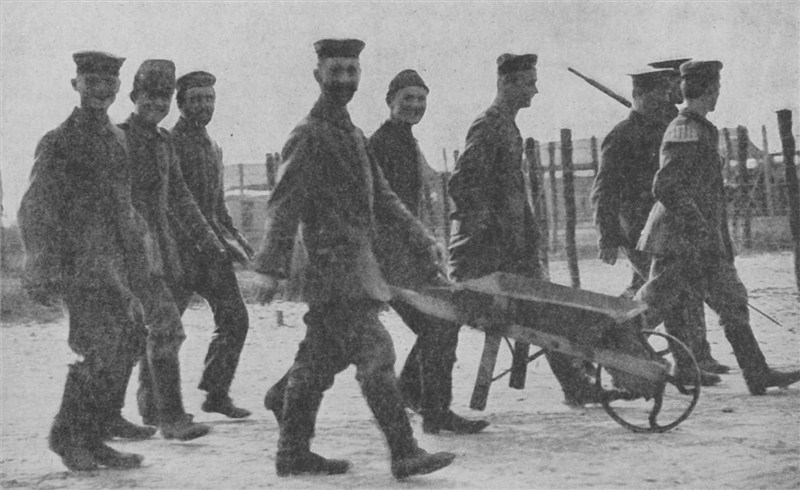
German prisoners in Britain on fatigue duty during World War I.

Fatigue duty (or fatigue labor) is the labor assigned to military men that does not require the use of armament. Parties sent on fatigue duty were known in English by the French term "en détachement" according to an 1805 military dictionary.

== History ==
The term is recorded in America in 1776, and in an 1805 British military dictionary.

=== United States ===
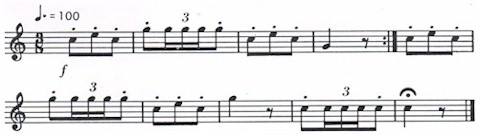
US Army call for all designated personnel to report to fatigue duty.

In the United States, the allowance of soldiers employed at work on fortifications, in surveys, in cutting roads, and other constant labor, of not less than ten days, was authorized by an act approved March 2, 1819, entitled An act to regulate the pay of the army when employed on fatigue duty and paid twenty-five cents per day for men employed as ordinary laborers and teamsters, and thirty-five to fifty cents per day for men employed as mechanics, depending on their location.

US soldiers on fatigue duty were allowed an extra gill of whiskey by the act of March 2, 1819. For a time in the 1870s, US Marine Corps company grade officers were supposed to wear an English model "pillbox" or "round cap" for fatigue duty, but it was never popular.

In Article 15 of the US Army Regulations of 1861, correctional custody includes fatigue duties, which is defined as follows:

All the irregular work that the Soldier is called upon to perform from time to time. In the fields, working upon roads, building field work, rifle pits, making or removing obstructions, duty or forage parties, and, in fact, all the duties where men are required, without arms. for short periods. In the barracks or quarters, there are many duties that call for details for fatigue, such as loading or unloading of stores, the removal of stores from one place to another, digging of graves for deceased Soldiers or officers, labor on the grounds, works, or buildings of the post.

During the American Civil War, Black soldiers were constantly assigned to fatigue labor, to the point it had become regular slavery. Complaints were made to President Lincoln. Commitments to avoid this discrimination were expressed – General Lorenzo Thomas had released the General Orders 21 outlawing discriminatory fatigue labor – but powerful US army leaders often turned a blind eye to this progressive intention whenever deemed necessary.

== See also ==
- Corvée
- Fatigue Call
