= Assembly (bugle call) =

Bugle call

Assembly
Assembly played on the bugle by a member of the United States Army Band

"Assembly" is a bugle call that signals troops to assemble at a designated place.

"Assembly" and "Adjutant's Call" are the two bugle calls that make up the "formation" category of bugle call.
