= First Sergeant's Call =

"First Sergeant's Call" is a bugle call which signals that the First Sergeant is about to form the company.
