= Boots and Saddles (bugle call) =

American military bugle call

"Boots and Saddles" is a bugle call sounded for mounted troops to mount and take their place in line. In the British Army it is used as a parade call. Its name drives from the French phrase boute-selle, "put on saddle".

The call has been used by the United States Army during the American Civil War as well as World War II. While the call was originally meant to apply exclusively to cavalry, it was used later as an inspiring call for other military units as well.

The tune was recorded in 1919 for the Victor Talking Machine Company's "Bugle Calls of the U.S. Army: Part 1".

== In literature ==
"Boots and Saddles" is blown several times in Mark Twain's 1907 novel A Horse's Tale.

Elizabeth Bacon Custer's 1885 biography of her husband, General George Armstrong Custer, was titled Boots and Saddles: Or, Life in Dakota with General Custer.
