= VA76 =

VA-76 has the following meanings:

- VA-76 (U.S. Navy)
- State Route 76 (Virginia)
