= Carlos Talbott =

United States Air Force general

Carlos M. Talbott
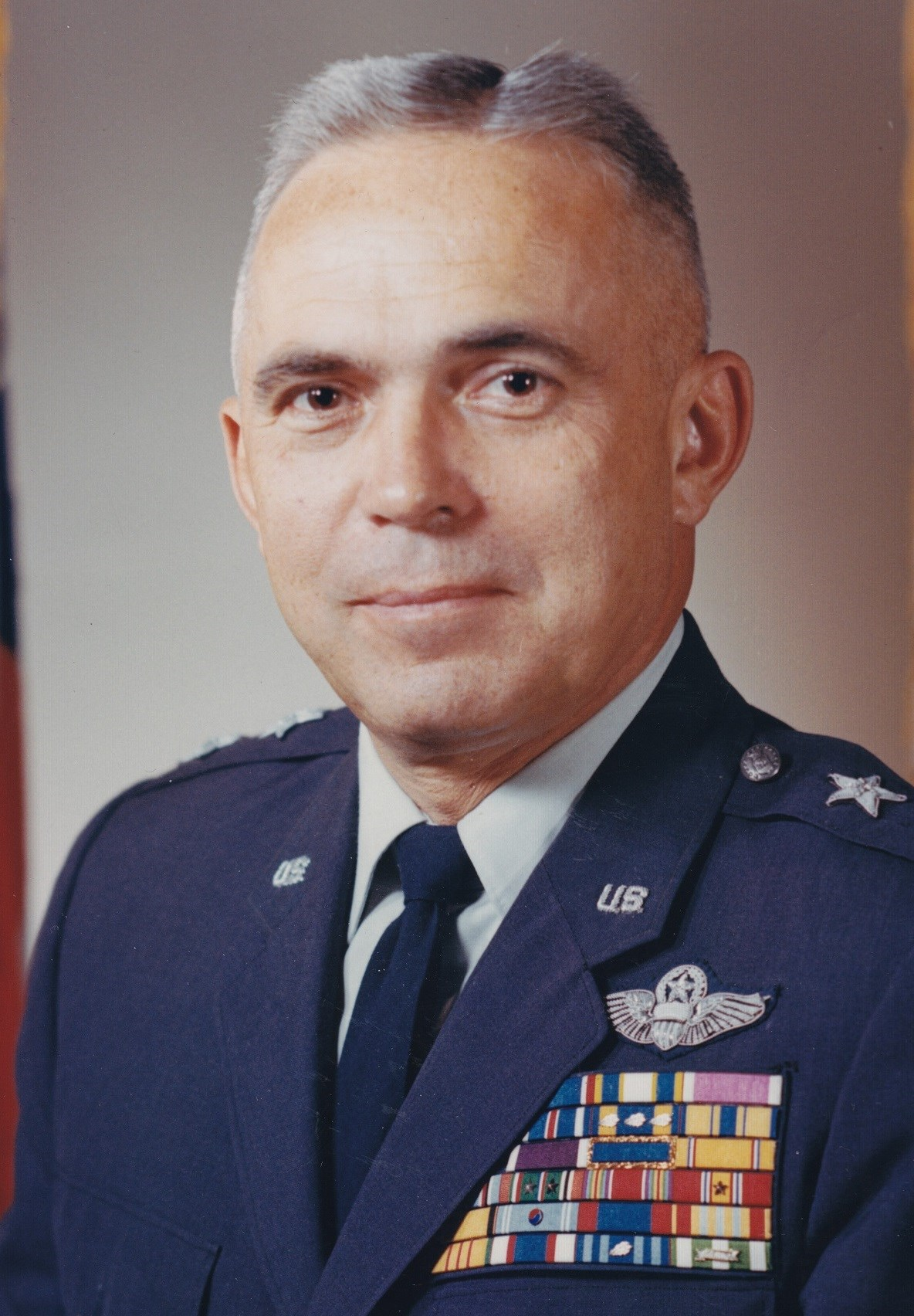
- Born: January 28, 1920; Charleston, Illinois, United States
- Died: February 26, 2015 (aged 95); Arlington, Virginia, United States
- Burial place: Arlington National Cemetery
- Military career
- Allegiance: United States of America
- Branch: United States Air Force
- Rank: Lieutenant General

Carlos Maurice Talbott (January 28, 1920 – February 26, 2015) was a United States Air Force officer who attained the rank of lieutenant general and was vice commander in chief of the Pacific Air Forces, headquartered at Hickam Air Force Base.

== Education ==
Born in Charleston, Illinois, he attended Eastern Illinois University from 1936 to 1939 and graduated from the United States Military Academy with a bachelor of science degree. He was commissioned as a second lieutenant in January 1943. While at the academy, he graduated from advanced flying school in Lake Charles, Louisiana in December 1942. He received his Master of Arts degree in international affairs from George Washington University in 1964.

== Career ==
Talbott's first assignment was as a Curtiss P-40 pilot at Dothan Field, Alabama. In March 1943 he became a P-47 pilot with the 326th and then the 368th Fighter Groups at Westover Field, Massachusetts and Mitchel Field, New York. In December 1943, during World War II, he went with the 368th Group to the European Theater of Operations as a pilot with the 397th Fighter Squadron. From October 1944 to April 1945 he was assigned as assistant operations officer and later operations officer of the 368th Fighter Group.

In May 1945 he returned to the United States and was assigned to Seymour Johnson Field, North Carolina. He attended the Army Command and General Staff School at Fort Leavenworth and in February 1946 returned to Seymour Johnson Field to be base adjutant. From May 1946 to March 1948 Talbott served with the Organization and Training Division of the War Department General Staff in Washington, D.C. He was then assigned to the Directorate of Training and Requirements, Deputy Chief of Staff, Operations, Headquarters U.S. Air Force.

Talbott went to Ankara, Turkey in March 1949 as a fighter pilot training adviser with the American Mission for Aid to Turkey and, in December 1950, became executive officer for the U.S. Air Force Group. In April 1951 he returned to Headquarters U.S. Air Force as an operations staff officer in the Directorate of Operations, Office of the Deputy Chief of Staff, Plans and Operations. In July 1954 Talbott became commander of the 322d Fighter Day Group at Foster Air Force Base, Texas. While in that position, he won the 1955 Bendix Trophy race flying a North American F-100 Super Sabre C model.

From August 1957 to June 1958 Talbott attended the Air War College at Maxwell Air Force Base. He then went to Japan as director of tactical operations and later was chief of Combat Operations Division, in the Office of the Deputy Chief of Staff for Operations, Headquarters Fifth Air Force, at Fuchu Air Station, Japan. He was assigned as director of operations, 8th Tactical Fighter Wing, at Itazuke Air Base in July 1960. Talbott returned to Headquarters U.S. Air Force in August 1962 as deputy chief of the Tactical Air Division, Directorate of Operational Requirements. In October 1962 he became chief of the Tactical Nuclear Branch in the Chairman, Joint Chiefs of Staff Special Studies Group.

Talbott assumed command of the 366th Tactical Fighter Wing at Holloman Air Force Base in August 1965 and went to Southeast Asia with the wing in March 1966. He was assigned in May 1966 as deputy director of the Tactical Air Control Center, Headquarters Seventh Air Force. In May 1967 he was assigned as the chief of staff for the United States Taiwan Defense Command, with headquarters in Taipei, Taiwan. Talbott returned to the United States in September 1968 and became vice commander of the Tenth Air Force at Richards-Gebaur Air Force Base. In August 1969 he was assigned as vice commander of the Ninth Air Force with headquarters at Shaw Air Force Base. In July 1970 he again was assigned to Headquarters U.S. Air Force as director of operations, Deputy Chief of Staff, Plans and Operations. In August 1972 he returned to the Republic of Vietnam as director of operations, Military Assistance Command, Vietnam, and deputy chief of staff, operations, Seventh Air Force. General Talbott was appointed vice commander in chief of Pacific Air Forces with headquarters at Hickam Air Force Base, Hawaii, in April 1973. He was promoted to the grade of lieutenant general effective April 6, 1973 with the same date of rank, and retired September 1, 1974.

Talbott was a command pilot, flew more than 4,500 hours, and, during World War II, flew 96 combat missions. His military decorations and awards include the Distinguished Service Cross, the Distinguished Service Medal with two oak leaf clusters, the Legion of Merit with oak leaf cluster, the Distinguished Flying Cross with oak leaf cluster, the Air Medal with 15 oak leaf clusters. the Air Force Commendation Medal, a Purple Heart;, the Gold Cross of the Royal Order of the Phoenix (Greece), the Korean Medal of Merit, the National Order of Vietnam, 5th Class, the Armed Forces Honor Medal, the Air Force Distinguished Service Order, 2d Class, the Order of Cloud and Banner, Republic of China, and the Air Force Wings of Turkey, China and the Republic of Vietnam.

== Awards ==
- Distinguished Service Cross
- Air Force Distinguished Service Medal with two oak leaf clusters
- Legion of Merit with oak leaf cluster
- Distinguished Flying Cross with oak leaf cluster
- Purple Heart
- Air Medal with fifteen oak leaf clusters
- Air Force Commendation Medal
