= 327th Air Division =

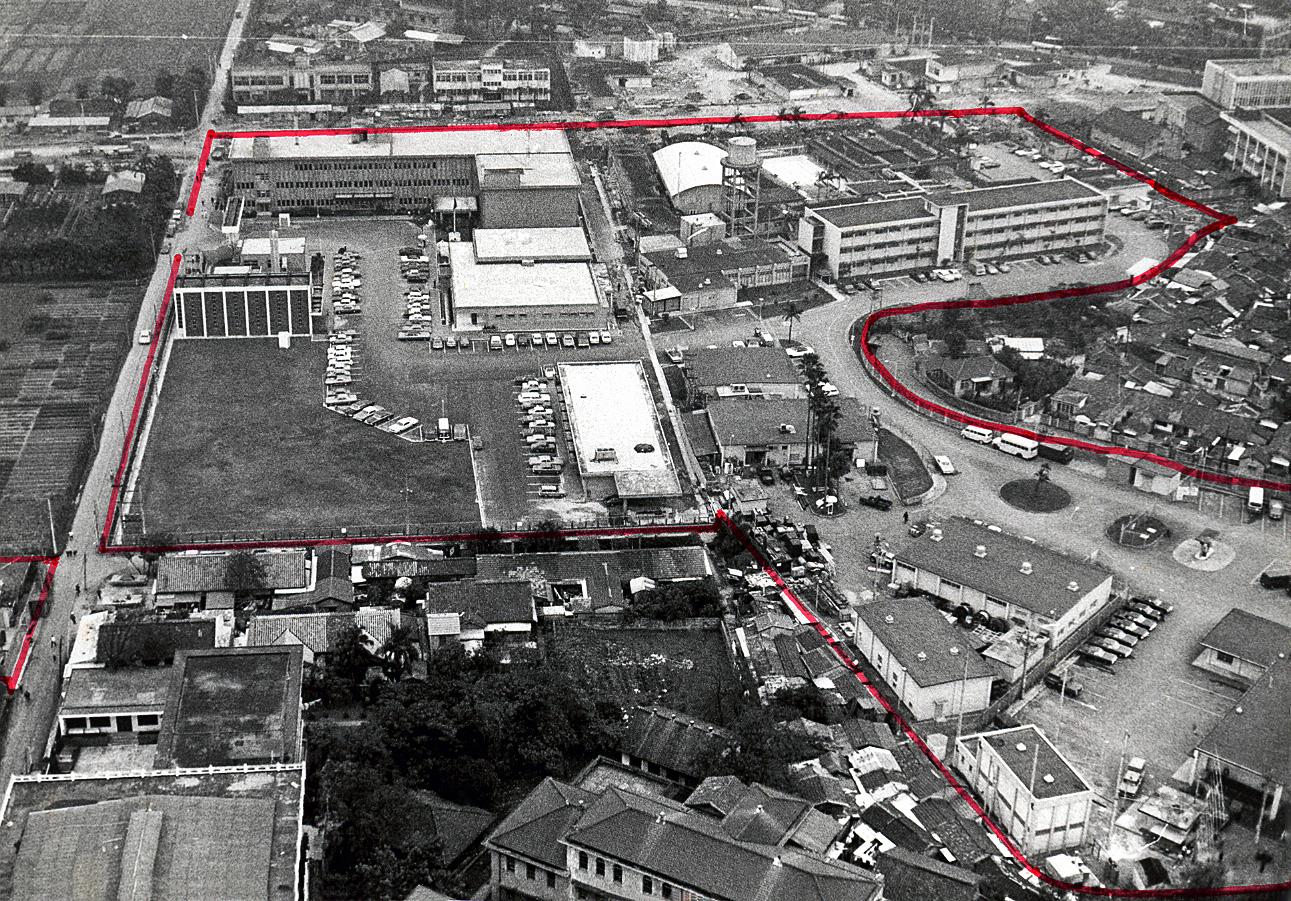
- Taipei Air Station, headquarters of 327th Air Division, in 1975
- Active: 1957–1960; 1966–1976
- Country: United States
- Branch: United States Air Force
- Role: Intermediate command of operational units

Insignia
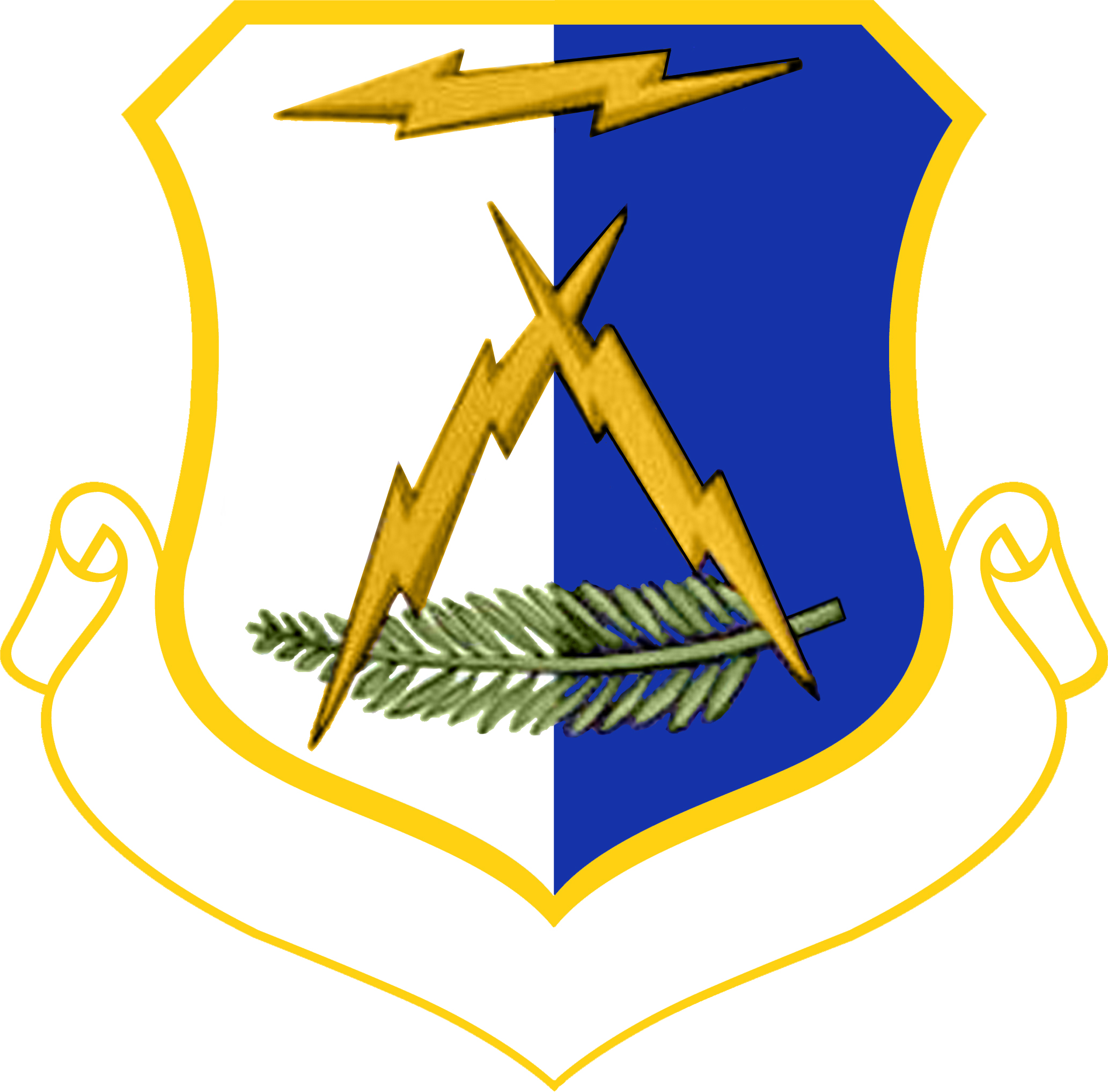
- 327th Air Division emblem (Note: Approved 9 December 1958. Description: per pale argent and azure, two lightning flashes saltirewise crossed at the upper ends or, surmounting a palm frond in base vert, in chief a lightning flash fesswise of the third [color mentioned] all overall and within a diminished border of the first [color mentioned].)

The 327th Air Division is an inactive air division of the United States Air Force (USAF). It was assigned to Thirteenth Air Force throughout its existence. It was last stationed at Taipei Air Station in Gongguan, Taipei Taiwan, where it was inactivated on 7 January 1976.

The division was first active on Guam from 1957 to 1960. At Guam it was responsible for the air defense of the Mariana Islands.

From 1966 to 1976, it was the administrative headquarters for all USAF units on Taiwan and supported other governmental agencies on the island. It also coordinated with the Republic of China Air Force for the air defense of Taiwan. The division, from 1966 through 1973, controlled an airlift wing that provided support for the Vietnam War. The division was inactivated following the visit of President Richard Nixon to China and the subsequent gradually withdrawal of US military forces from Taiwan.

== History ==
=== Air defense of Guam ===
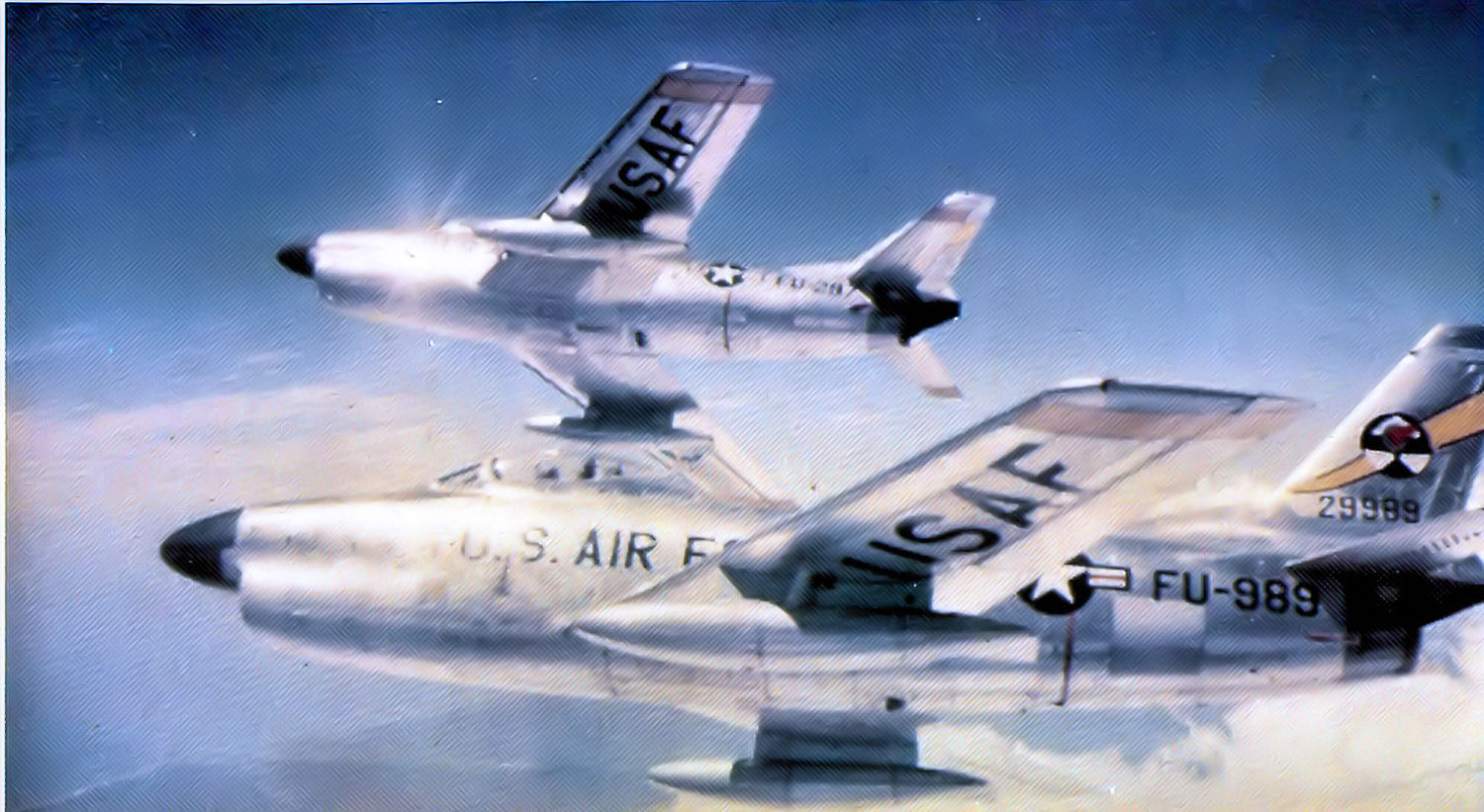
41st Fighter-Interceptor Squadron F-86Ds (Note: Aircraft in foreground is North American F-86D-50-NA Sabre, serial 52-9989. This airplane was transferred to the Japanese Air Self Defense Force and is on display at Yamanashi. Baugher, Joe (15 July 2023). "1952 USAF Serial Numbers". Joe Baugher.)

The 327th Air Division was activated on 1 July 1957 at Andersen Air Force Base, Guam. It assumed responsibility for the air defense of the Mariana Islands and was also known as the Marianas Air Defense Division. To accomplish its mission, the division was assigned the 852d Aircraft Control and Warning Squadron, and the 41st Fighter-Interceptor Squadron. The 41st flew radar equipped North American F-86D Sabres, armed with Mighty Mouse rockets. In addition to Air Force training, these units also trained with naval organizations and participated in military exercises. The division and 41st Squadron were discontinued on 8 March 1960, while the 852d was inactivated in June.

=== USAF headquarters for Taiwan ===
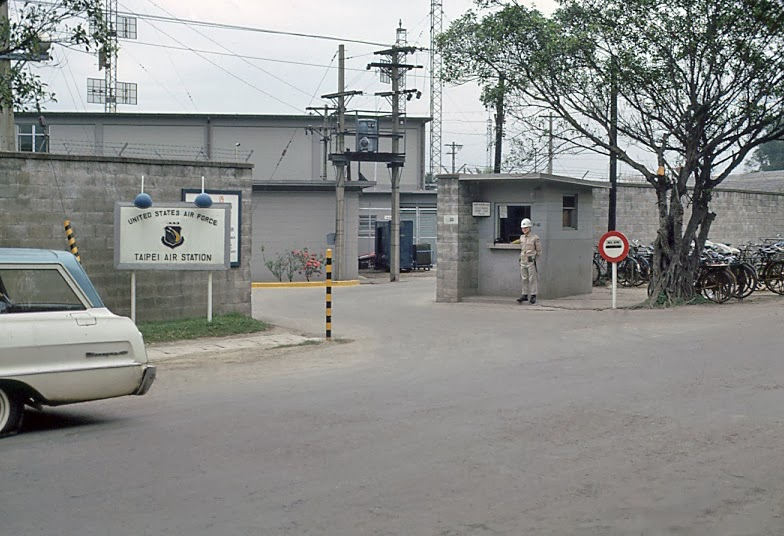
Taipei Air Station, Main Gate in 1968

The origins of the division's reactivation on Taiwan lie with Air Task Force 13 (Provisional). Air task forces had been active on Taiwan as early as 1955, under the command of then-Brigadier General Benjamin O. Davis, Jr. General Davis was the vice commander of Thirteenth Air Force, and had the additional duty as commander of Air Task Force 13 when it was activated. The task force formed the air component of the United States Taiwan Defense Command.

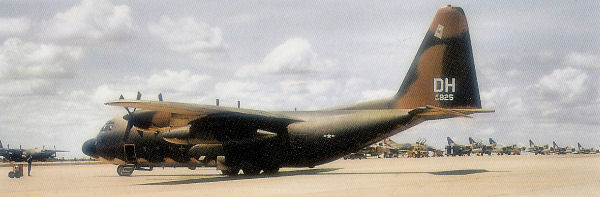
Division C-130E at CCK (Note: Aircraft is Lockheed C-130E-LM Hercules, serial 63-7825 of the 345th Tactical Airlift Squadron. this plane was transferred to the Aerospace Maintenance and Regeneration Center on 6 August 2009. Baugher, Joe (26 July 2023). "1963 USAF Serial Numbers". Joe Baugher.)

On 8 February 1966, the division replaced the task force at Taipei Air Station, Taiwan and assumed responsibility for Air Force units on Taiwan. The largest unit assigned to the division was the 314th Troop Carrier Wing, which had moved to Ching Chuan Kang Air Base, Taichung (commonly called "CCK") in January 1966 to augment airlift in the Pacific as part of the buildup of forces associated with the Vietnam War. Initially, the wing was attached to the division administratively, remaining under the operational control of the 315th Air Division like other Lockheed C-130 Hercules units in the Pacific, but in November 1968 it was assigned to the 327th Division. The 314th provided airlift throughout the Pacific, particularly combat airlift in Southeast Asia.

The 327th Air Division provided logistics, administrative and service support for military and United States government agencies on Taiwan. In addition, it coordinated air defense operations and plans with the Republic of China Air Force to integrate combined forces into the overall Pacific Command. In fulfilling its mission, the 327th participated in numerous military exercises.

In the spring of 1971 the 314th Wing moved on paper to Little Rock Air Force Base, where it replaced the 64th Tactical Airlift Wing. The 374th Tactical Airlift Wing, which had lost all its aircraft and become non-operational at Naha Air Base, Okinawa in April assumed the aircraft and personnel of the 314th and continued its airlift mission. In 1972, the 374th Wing participated in humanitarian missions following flooding in the Philippines and the following year supported Operation Homecoming, the repatriation of American prisoners of war from Hanoi.

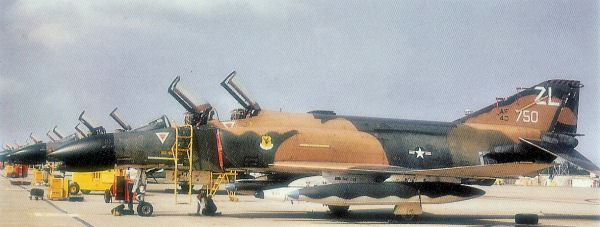
F-4C Phantoms deployed at Ching Chuan Kang AB (Note: Aircraft in the foreground is McDonnell F-4C-23-MC Phantom II, serial 64-0750 of the 44th Tactical Fighter Squadron at Taichung, Taiwan on 2 October 1973. This aircraft was sent to the Aberdeen Proving Ground for use as a target in November 1986. Baugher, Joe (15 July 2023). "1964 USAF Serial Numbers". Joe Baugher.)

As airlift operations at CCK began to wind down, the 374th Wing and its flying squadrons moved to Clark Air Base in November 1973 and it was replaced as the CCK support unit by the 6217th Combat Support Group. The group was later renamed the 6217th Tactical Group to reflect its mission of controlling deployed fighter units at CCK. In May 1975, F-4 fighter units withdrew from CCK Air Base to Kadena Air Base. In June 1975, preparations began to close CCK and the group was replaced by the 6217th Air Base Squadron, which managed the disposition of Air Force assets as the base shut down.

Although no official announcement had been made connecting these changes with the revised China policy of the United States, these reductions reflected that soon after the Shanghai Communiqué was issued in 1972, steps began to reduce the United States military presence in Taiwan with the ultimate objective of withdrawing all personnel and closing all bases. The division was inactivated on 7 January 1976.

== Lineage ==
- Constituted as the 327th Air Division on 22 June 1957
- Activated on 1 July 1957
- Discontinued on 8 March 1960
- Organized on 8 February 1966
- Inactivated on 7 January 1976

=== Assignments ===
- Thirteenth Air Force, 1 July 1957 – 8 March 1960
- Thirteenth Air Force, 8 February 1966 – 7 January 1976

=== Components ===
Wings

- 314th Troop Carrier Wing (later 314th Tactical Airlift Wing), (attached 8 February 1966 – 1 November 1968, assigned 1 November 1968 – 31 May 1971)

Ching Chuan Kang Air Base

- 374th Tactical Airlift Wing: 31 May 1971 – 15 November 1973

Ching Chuan Kang Air Base

Groups

- 6214th Combat Support Group (later 6214th Air Base Group, 6214th Air Base Squadron): 8 February 1966 – 31 May 1975

Tainan Air Station

- 6217th Combat Support Group: 8 February 1966 – 31 May 1968

Ching Chuan Kang Air Base

- 6217th Combat Support Group (later 6217 Tactical Group): 15 November 1973 – 31 May 1975

Ching Chuan Kang Air Base

Squadrons

- 41st Fighter-Interceptor Squadron: 1 October 1957 – 8 March 1960
- 852d Aircraft Control and Warning Squadron: 1 July 1957 – 8 March 1960

Operated at Mount Santa Rosa

- 6213th Support Squadron (later 6213th Air Base Squadron): 8 February 1966 – 7 January 1976
- 6214th Air Base Squadron: See 6214th Combat Support Group
- 6215th Support Squadron: 8 February 1966 – 7 January 1976

Chiayi Air Base

- 6217th Air Base Squadron: 31 May 1975 – 7 January 1976

Ching Chuan Kang Air Base

Other

- USAF Dispensary, Taipei (later USAF Clinic, Taipei): 17 May 1971 – 1 April 1973
- 6205th Tactical Control Flight: 30 September 1971 – 30 June 1972

=== Headquarters ===
- Andersen Air Force Base, Guam, 1 July 1957 – 8 March 1960
- Taipei Air Station, Taiwan, 8 February 1966 – 7 January 1976

=== Aircraft ===
- North American F-86D Sabre, 1957–1960
- Lockheed C-130 Hercules, 1966–1973
- Douglas C-47 Skytrain, 1971–1972
- Douglas C-54 Skymaster, 1971–1972
- McDonnell Douglas F-4 Phantom II, 1970–1975

== See also ==
- List of Douglas C-47 Skytrain operators
- List of Lockheed C-130 Hercules operators
- List of Sabre and Fury units in the US military
- List of United States Air Force air divisions
