= Alfred M. Pride =

United States Navy admiral

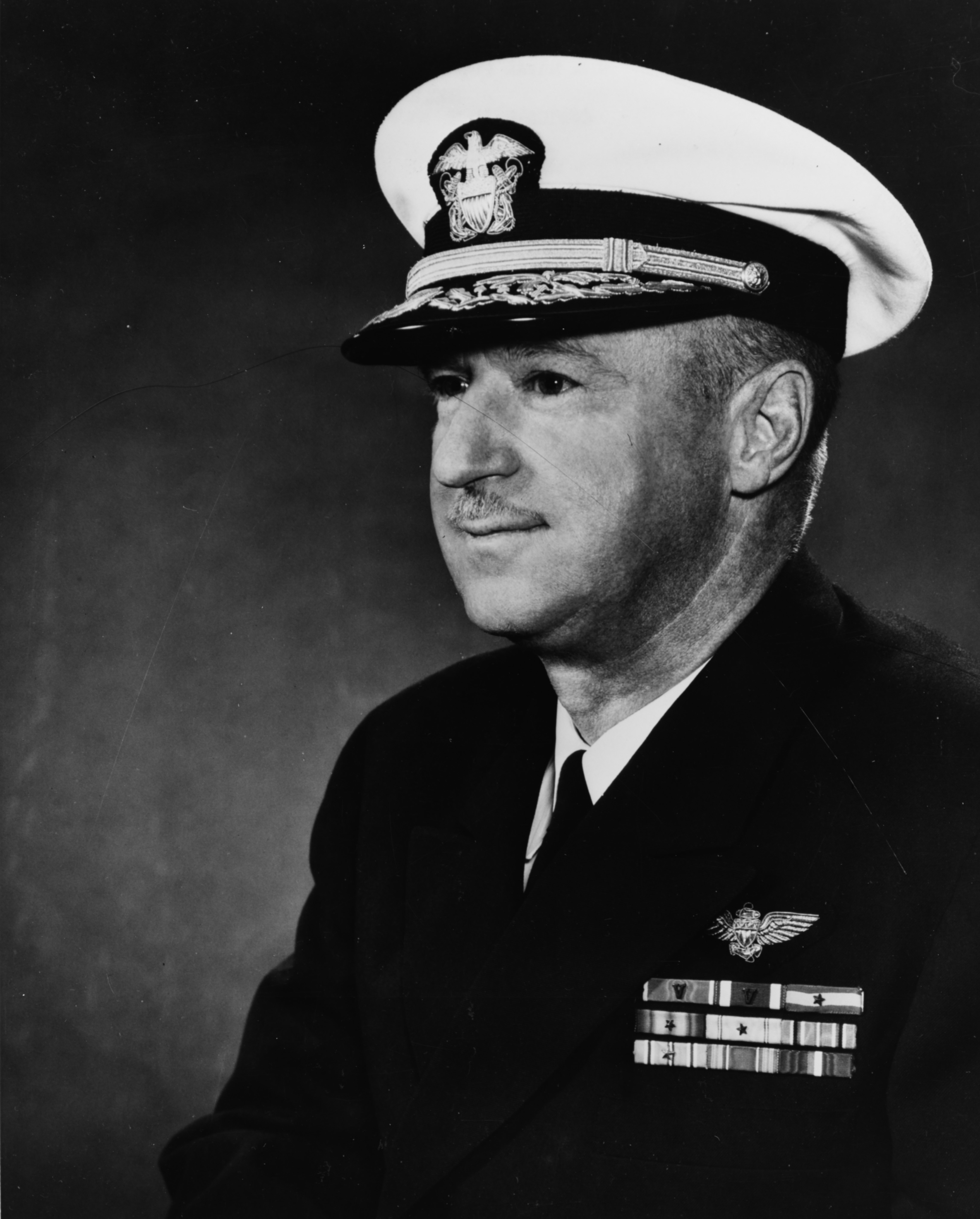
- Alfred M. Pride
- Born: Alfred Melville Pride; September 10, 1897; Somerville, Massachusetts, U.S.
- Died: December 24, 1988 (aged 91); Arnold, Maryland, U.S.
- Burial place: Arlington National Cemetery
- Military career
- Allegiance: United States
- Branch: United States Navy
- Service years: 1917–1959
- Rank: Admiral
- Commands: Bureau of Aeronautics; United States Taiwan Defense Command
- Conflicts: World War I World War II
- Awards: Distinguished Service Medal (2); Legion of Merit

Alfred Melville Pride (September 10, 1897 – December 24, 1988) was a United States Navy admiral and pioneer naval aviator, who distinguished himself during World War II as an aircraft carrier commander.

He served during the late 1940s as Chief of the Bureau of Aeronautics and during the Korean War as Commander of the U.S. Seventh Fleet. Pride's career was remarkable for its time, in that he achieved flag rank without having attended the United States Naval Academy or even completing college. (He did, however, later complete advanced studies in aeronautical engineering.)

A native of Somerville, Massachusetts, he studied engineering at Tufts University in Medford, Massachusetts, for several years before dropping out to enlist in the Navy during World War I. He served first as a machinist's mate in the Naval Reserve, but was soon given the chance to receive flight training and gain a commission as an ensign. Pride was sent to France, where he served briefly during the latter part of the war.

In the early 1920s, having joined the Regular Navy, Pride became involved in the experiments to develop U.S. aircraft carriers. He served aboard the USS Langley, the converted coaling ship that became the Navy's first aircraft carrier, and also took part in the development of the carriers USS Saratoga and USS Lexington, as a member of the original crews.

Pride continued his work in Naval Aviation testing for the rest of the interwar period. He went on to study aeronautical engineering at the Massachusetts Institute of Technology (MIT). In 1931, he became the first person to land an Autogiro (precursor to the helicopter) on an aircraft carrier. From 1934–1936 he headed the Flight Test Section at Naval Air Station Anacostia, Washington, D.C., at that time the Navy's center for aircraft testing.

During World War II, Pride served as first commanding officer of the carrier USS Belleau Wood (CVL-24). He received promotion to rear admiral and became commandant of 14th Naval District, at Pearl Harbor, Hawaii. He then was moved out to fleet jobs, including command of Carrier Division Six and Carrier Division Four.

After the war, Rear Admiral Pride held important positions relating to Naval Aviation's technical development. From 1947 to 1951 he served as chief of the Bureau of Aeronautics, the Navy's material organization for aviation. From 1952 to 1953, he commanded the Naval Air Test Center, Patuxent River, Maryland.

He returned to the Pacific in 1953, when he received promotion to vice admiral, command of the U.S. Seventh Fleet (December 1, 1953 – December 19, 1955) and the first commander of the United States Taiwan Defense Command (USTDC). During this time, he was featured on the cover of the Time magazine (February 7, 1955 issue). Pride served as head of the Seventh Fleet until 1956, when he became Commander, Air Forces, Pacific Fleet.

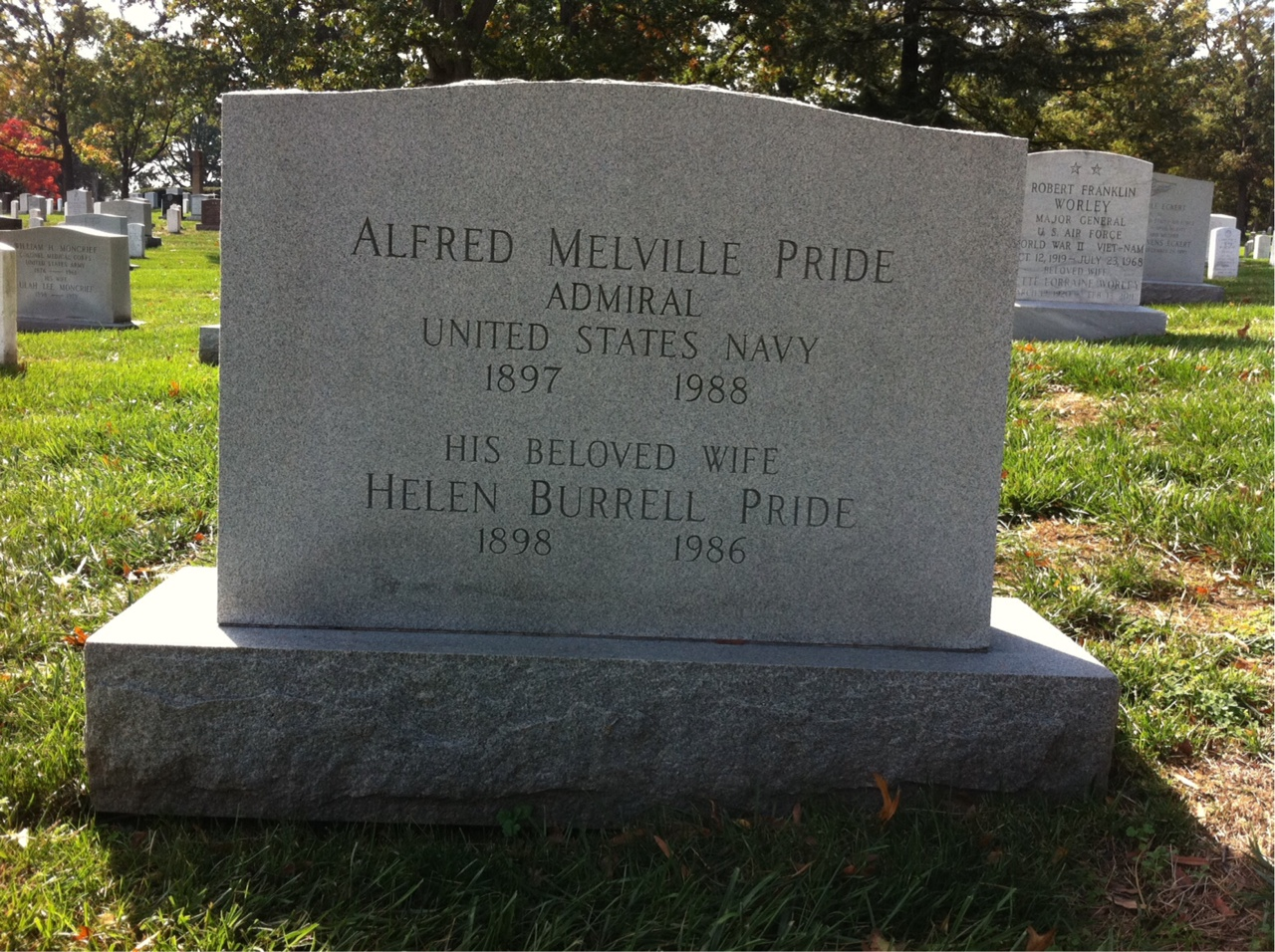
Grave at Arlington National Cemetery

Pride retired in 1959 as a full admiral and settled in Arlington, Virginia, where he died in 1988, aged 91. He is buried at Arlington National Cemetery in Arlington, Virginia. Many of his papers are stored at the Archives Division of the Smithsonian Institution's National Air and Space Museum, Washington, D.C.

== Awards and honors ==
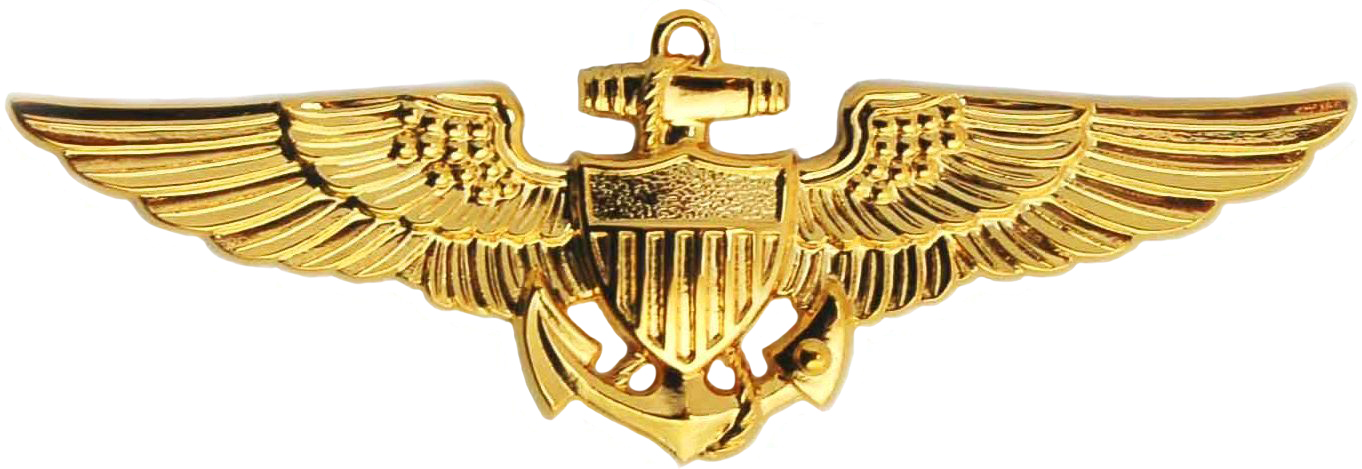

Naval Aviator Badge
Navy Distinguished Service Medal w/ gold star
Legion of Merit w/ "V" device	Navy Commendation Medal w/ "V" device	Navy Presidential Unit Citation w/ 3/16" bronze star
World War I Victory Medal w/ clasp	American Defense Service Medal w/ clasp	American Campaign Medal
Asiatic-Pacific Campaign Medal w/ one 3/16" silver star	World War II Victory Medal	Philippine Liberation Medal

His honors included being a Companion of the Naval Order of the United States and a member of the National Museum of Naval Aviation's Hall of Honor. The Navy Department also established the Admiral Alfred M. Pride Frigate ASW Readiness Award, for excellence in Anti-Submarine Warfare in the Navy's surface force.

In 1961, Pride was retroactively designated the ninth recipient of the Gray Eagle Award, as the most senior active naval aviator from July 1959 until his retirement later that year.
