= Austin K. Doyle =

United States Navy Admiral

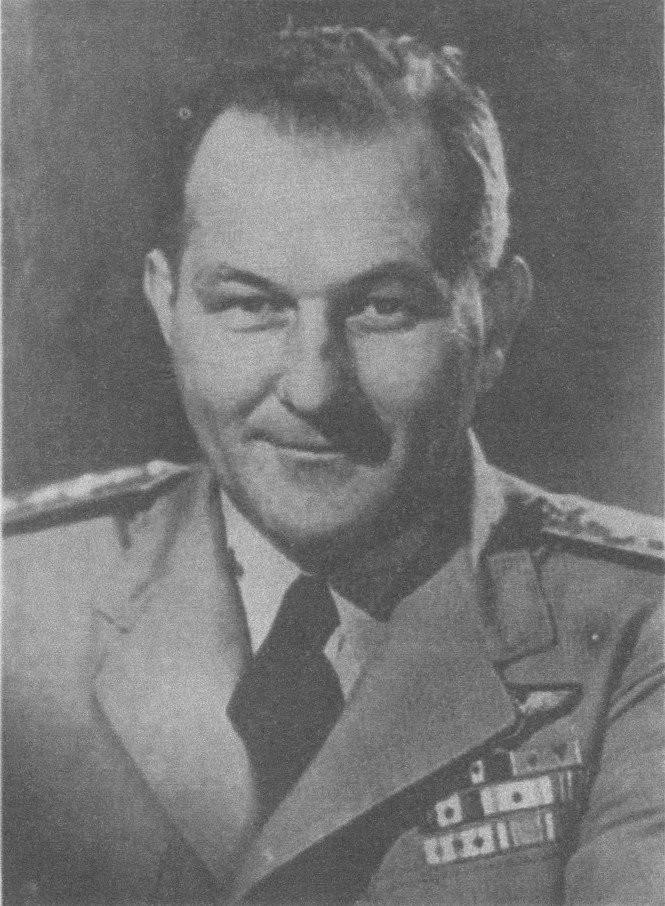
- Born: 7 November 1898; Port Richmond, Staten Island, New York, U.S.
- Died: 12 July 1970 (aged 71); Pensacola, Florida, U.S.
- Burial place: Barrancas National Cemetery, Pensacola, Florida
- Military career
- Allegiance: United States
- Branch: U.S. Navy
- Service years: 1916–1958
- Rank: Admiral
- Commands: United States Taiwan Defense Command; Naval Air Training Command; Tenth Naval District; Carrier Division 4; Carrier Division 25; USS Hornet; USS Nassau; USS Saratoga Air Group; Fighting Squadron Three
- Conflicts: World War I World War II
- Awards: Navy Cross (2); Distinguished Service Medal; Legion of Merit (2)

Austin Kelvin Doyle (7 November 1898 – 12 July 1970) was an American naval officer, admiral, chief of United States Taiwan Defense Command and Naval Air Training Command. During World War II, he served as United States Navy captain of the escort carrier USS Nassau and the fleet carrier USS Hornet, earning the Navy Cross twice. After serving in the US Navy for forty years, Doyle retired in 1958. He also served as a rear admiral.

== Biography ==
Doyle was born in Port Richmond, Staten Island, New York and later moved to Pensacola, Florida where he spent about twenty years. He entered the United States Naval Academy at Annapolis in September 1916, beginning 41 years of service in the United States Navy Department. Doyle served aboard USS Connecticut in the summer of 1918 during World War I and graduated with the Class of 1920 in June 1919. He completed flight training as a naval aviator in December 1922.

Before World War II, Doyle became commanding officer of Fighting Squadron Three on USS Saratoga in June 1938 and then of the Saratoga Air Group in 1939. During the war, he served as the first commanding officer of USS Nassau from August 1942 to September 1943 and then as the commanding officer of USS Hornet from August 1944 to August 1945. Doyle was promoted to rear admiral in August 1945 and given command of Carrier Division 25.

The President of United States conferred numerous military decorations upon him for his contribution to the US during World War II. In 1944, Doyle was conferred the Legion of Merit in recognition of his duty as commanding officer of Nassau. In 1945 and 1946, he was awarded two Navy Cross awards for bravery in combat as commanding officer of Hornet and later, in the same year, the government conferred a second award of the Legion of Merit upon Doyle in recognition of his duty as commanding officer of Hornet.

After the war, Doyle served as chief of Naval Reserve Training from July 1949 to August 1951. He then served as commander of Carrier Division 4 for a year before becoming commander of the Tenth Naval District and the Caribbean Sea Frontier in October 1952.

Promoted to vice admiral in May 1954, Doyle assumed command of Naval Air Training in June 1954. He was reassigned to the Taiwan Defense Command in March 1957, assuming command from Vice Admiral Stuart H. Ingersoll in July 1957. Doyle retired from active duty on 1 August 1958 and was advanced to full admiral on the retired list in recognition of his World War II combat service. He was also awarded the Navy Distinguished Service Medal.

== Personal life ==
Austin was married to Jamie Reese Doyle of Pensacola. The couple had four children, including three sons and a daughter, as well as five grandchildren. Apart from this, he had two siblings, a brother and a sister.

Admiral Doyle Drive in New Iberia, Louisiana, was named for him in the 1960s.

== Death ==
Doyle was suffering from multiple ailments and was subsequently admitted to Pensacola Naval Air Station hospital and died at the same medical institute on 12 July 1970. He is buried at Barrancas National Cemetery in Pensacola, Florida.
