= USS Nassau (CVE-16) =

Escort carrier that served in the U.S. Navy

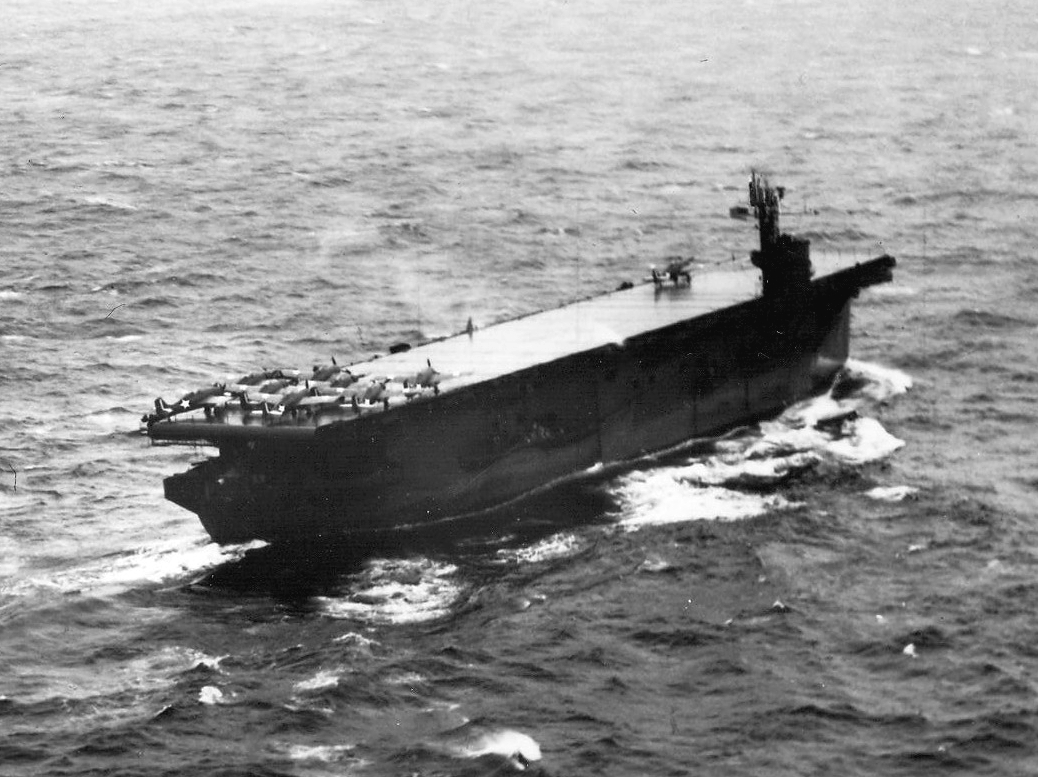
- USS Nassau underway off Attu in May 1943

History

United States
- Name: USS Nassau
- Namesake: Raid of Nassau
- Laid down: 27 November 1941
- Launched: 4 April 1942
- Commissioned: 20 August 1942
- Decommissioned: 28 October 1946
- Fate: Sold for scrap, 1961

General characteristics
- Class & type: Bogue-class escort carrier
- Displacement: 9,600 tons
- Length: 495.75 ft (151.10 m)
- Beam: 69.5 ft (21.2 m)
- Draft: 26 ft (7.9 m)
- Speed: 16.5 knots
- Complement: 890 officers and men
- Armament: 2 × 4"/50, 5"/38 or 5"/51 guns, 8 twin × 40 mm Bofors, 27 single × 20 mm guns Oerlikon
- Aircraft carried: 24

USS Nassau (CVE-16) (originally AVG-16 then ACV-16) was laid down 27 November 1941 by the Seattle-Tacoma Shipbuilding Corporation of Tacoma, Washington, as M.C. Hull No. 234; launched 4 April 1942; sponsored by Mrs. G. H. Hasselman, Tongue Point, Oregon; acquired by the Navy 1 May, towed to the Puget Sound Navy Yard, Bremerton, Washington, and converted to an escort carrier; and commissioned 20 August, Captain Austin K. Doyle in command.

Nassau was one of thirty-seven Tacoma-built C3 CVEs, of which twenty-six went to the Royal Navy. It was one of the ten Bogue-class escort carriers that served in the U.S. Navy.

== Service history ==
On 10 October, Nassau arrived at the Naval Air Station, Alameda, California, loaded aircraft, and four days later steamed for Pearl Harbor, thence to Palmyra Island, arriving 30 October. For the next four months, she operated between Palmyra and Nouméa, New Caledonia and Espiritu Santo, New Hebrides.

Nassau returned to Pearl Harbor 14 February 1943, embarked personnel and aircraft, and sailed 21 February on a ferry mission to Espiritu Santo. She returned to Pearl Harbor in mid-March and then continued on to Alameda, California. In April, she moved to San Diego and conducted flight training operations, after which she rendezvoused with Task Group 51.1 and steamed for Cold Bay, Alaska with Composite Squadron 21 (VC-21) embarked.

Nassau got underway on a search mission 4 May and conducted flight operations with Task Force 51, providing air cover for the Battle of Attu Island from 11 May through 20 May. She returned to San Diego in late May, arrived at Alameda 8 June and onloaded 45 aircraft destined for Brisbane, Australia. She delivered the aircraft 2 July and returned to San Diego via Nouméa, New Caledonia.

In August, she trained off San Diego before ferrying planes to Samoa. Returning to San Diego from Samoa, 19 October, Nassau embarked Marine Fighter Squadron 225 (VMF-225) for passage to Pearl Harbor. Arriving 30 October, she conducted air operations off Pearl Harbor during the early days of November and on 7 November, she embarked Fighter Squadron 7 (VF-1) and steamed for the Gilbert Islands for operations with Task Force 52.

Nassau's mission was to transport VF-1 to Tarawa and to send it ashore as soon as facilities were available. The invasion of Tarawa commenced 20 November but encountered bitter resistance. As a result, VF-1 was assigned combat air patrol and flew bombing and strafing runs from the carrier in support of the assault troops. The squadron flew a total of 106 missions and spent 237 hours of flying time in four days of operations without losing a single plane or pilot.

Nassau returned to Pearl Harbor on 5 December following flight operations. She then sailed to the Marshall Islands with Task Group 51.2 and launched strikes 29 January 1944 against Taroa Field on Maloelap Atoll. The next day, the Task Group centered its operations around Kwajalein, Wotje, and Maloelap Atolls, with Nassau conducting both anti-submarine and combat air patrols.

Nassau returned to Pearl Harbor 3 March, disembarked VC-66, and took on aircraft, cargo, and passengers for ferry to the Marshall Islands. Throughout March, ferry missions were performed between Kwajalein, Majuro, and Pearl Harbor. After repairs and alterations at Mare Island Navy Yard, the carrier sailed with 51 aircraft for Finschhafen, New Guinea 5 May. The next four months she performed ferry missions from San Diego to Pearl Harbor, the Admiralties and the New Hebrides Islands.

Upon arrival at Seeadler Harbor 1 September, Nassau reported to Commander Task Group 30.8. Thus began her tour of duty with Admiral Halsey's 3rd Fleet, which made unprecedented naval history in the following months. Nassau's mission was to operate out of the Admiralties with other escort carriers to provide replacement aircraft and pilots for the attack carriers of Task Force 38. Steaming in company with the oiler groups, which refueled the ships of the Task Force at sea, Nassau made three cruises into the western Pacific. She returned to the Admiralties with disabled aircraft which were destined for shipment to Pearl Harbor or the United States for reconditioning.

The first of these replacement trips was in support of the strikes against Palau; the second in support of operations against the southern and central Philippines. Then Task Force 38 shifted to more northerly targets in the Philippines and Formosa. Nassau reached Manus on 20 October. After offloading old aircraft and taking on new ones, she departed on her last replacement trip. Steaming to Ulithi Atoll in the Caroline Islands, she joined up with Task Groups 38.1 and 38.3 on 28 October and transferred 70 aircraft and 43 pilots to the attack carriers.

Task Unit 12.6.1, composed of Nassau, Tennessee and four other ships steamed for Pearl Harbor 5 November, arriving 16 November. Two days later, Nassau was dispatched to San Diego. Among her passengers were 382 survivors of Princeton, which was sunk in the Battle of Leyte Gulf, 24 October 1944. Another ferry mission to Pearl Harbor followed in mid-November, with three more runs to Guam in December, January 1945, and February. Nassau returned to Alameda, California, 23 March and through the remainder of the war, performed transport and ferry missions between Alameda, Pearl Harbor, Guam, Manus, Samar and Saipan.

Nassau departed Alameda 13 May 1946 for Tacoma, Washington. On 28 October, she decommissioned and entered the Pacific Reserve Fleet. Designated for modification for aircraft transportation purposes, her classification was changed to CVHE-16, 12 June 1955. Shortly thereafter she transferred to the Bremerton Reserve Group, and was struck from the Navy Register, 1 March 1959. In June 1961, she was towed to Japan for scrapping.

== Awards ==
Nassau received five battle stars for World War II service.
