= James B. Linder =

James Benjamin Linder
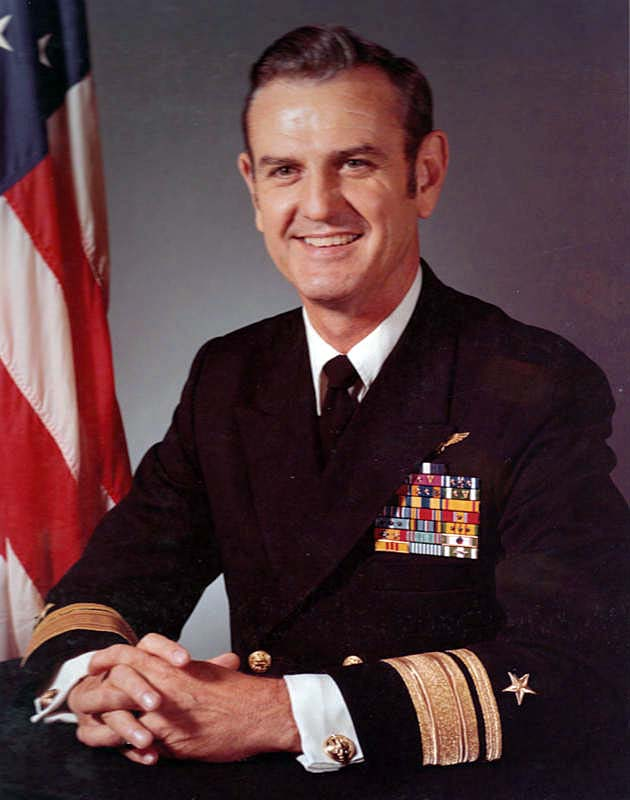
- RADM James B. Linder
- Born: October 13, 1925; Osceola, Iowa, U.S.
- Died: April 7, 2009 (aged 83); Oro Valley, Arizona, U.S.
- Burial place: Forest Home Cemetery; Mount Pleasant, Iowa
- Relatives: Patricia Linder (wife)
- Military career
- Allegiance: United States of America
- Branch: United States Navy
- Service years: 1943, 1949-1979
- Rank: Rear Admiral
- Units: VF-112; VA-76; Carrier Air Wing 15
- Commands: VA-76; Carrier Air Wing 15; USS Sylvania (AFS-2); USS Forrestal (CVA-59); Carrier Group 4; United States Taiwan Defense Command
- Conflicts: World War II Korean War Vietnam War
- Awards: Navy Cross

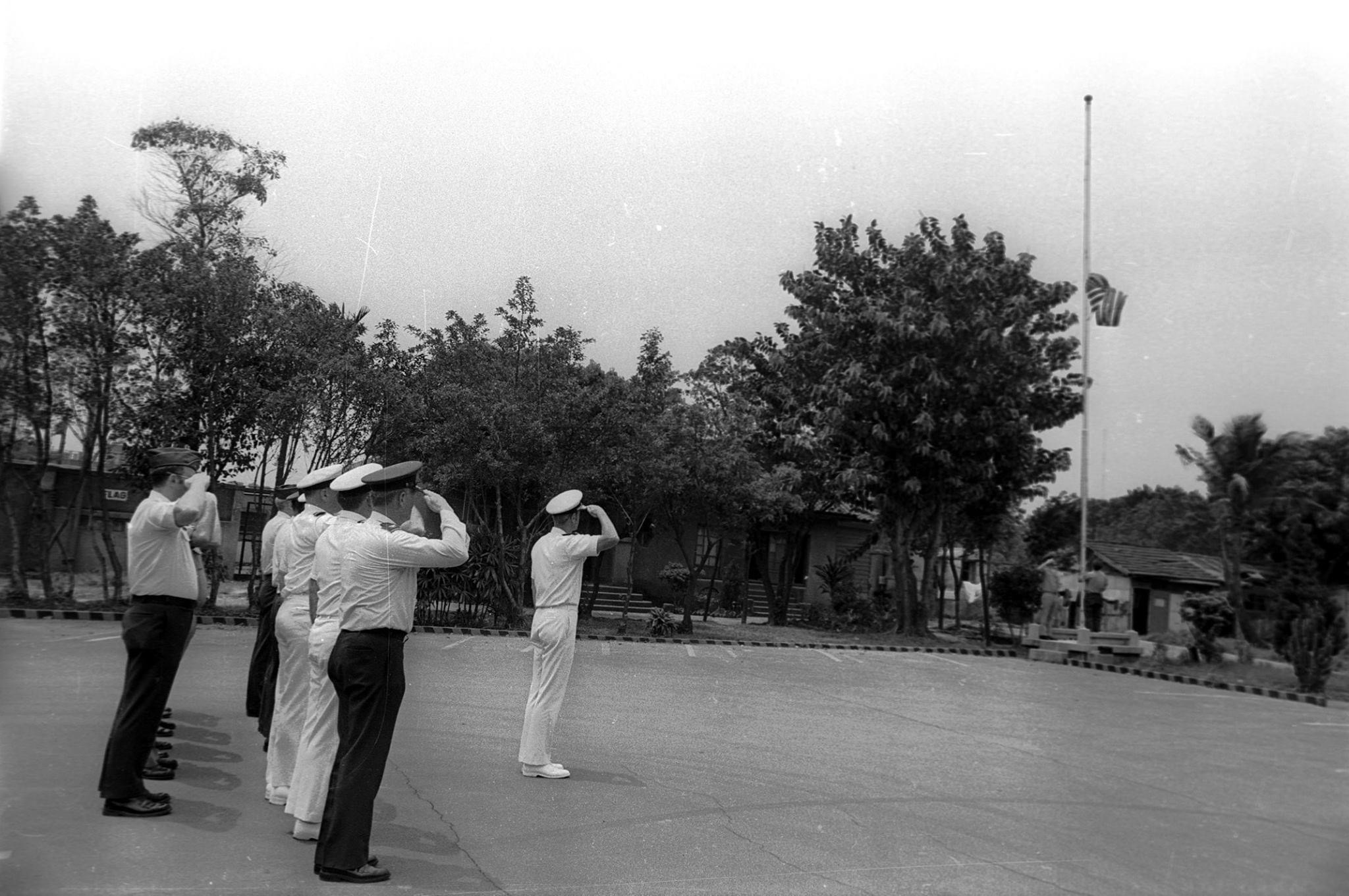
On 28 April 1979, the U.S. flag was lowered for the last time in front of the United States Taiwan Defense Command. Rear Admiral James Linder, USTDC Commander, presided over this ceremony.

James Benjamin Linder (October 13, 1925 – April 7, 2009) was a flag officer and highly decorated Naval Aviator in the United States Navy. He served in both the Korean War and Vietnam War.

He was the last commander of the United States Taiwan Defense Command. He retired as a rear admiral and is one of the top 25 most decorated American veterans.

== Biography ==
Linder was born on October 13, 1925, in Osceola, Iowa. He enlisted in the United States Navy on May 19, 1943, serving until October 31, 1943.

On 11 May 1966, he was awarded the Silver Star for leading the squadron on a strike against a mobile SAM site at Thanh Hóa, North Vietnam. After earning the Navy Cross and Silver Star in combat, he earned a Second, Third, and Fourth Silver Star over a period of three consecutive days.

He was the last Commander of the U.S. Taiwan Defense Command and he oversaw the termination of the official command and closing down of all subordinate commands as well, due to switching of diplomatic relations from the Republic of China to the People's Republic of China. In 1979, he served as Special Assistant to the Commander-in-Chief of Pacific Command Admiral Donald C. Davis until his retirement on August 31, 1979.

== Later life ==
Linder was married to Patricia Joy Weir on June 9, 1949, at Mount Pleasant, Iowa. They had a son and daughter; three grandchildren and four great-grandchildren. After his retirement from Navy, they settled in Southwestern United States.

Linder died on April 7, 2009, in Oro Valley, Arizona, and is buried at Forest Home Cemetery at Mount Pleasant, Iowa.

== Ships and fighter squadrons RADM Linder served with or commanded ==
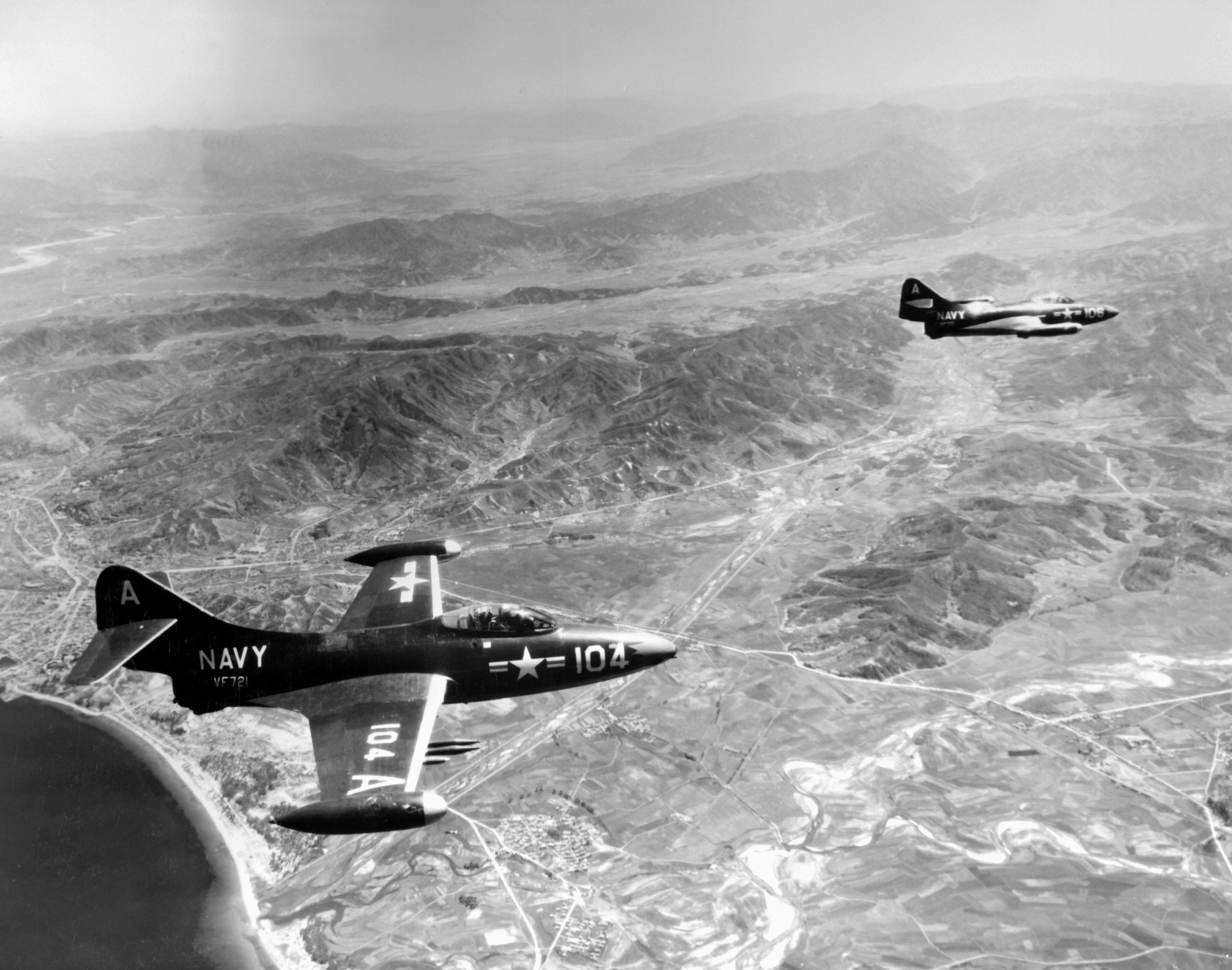
F9F Panthers over Korea (VF-112)

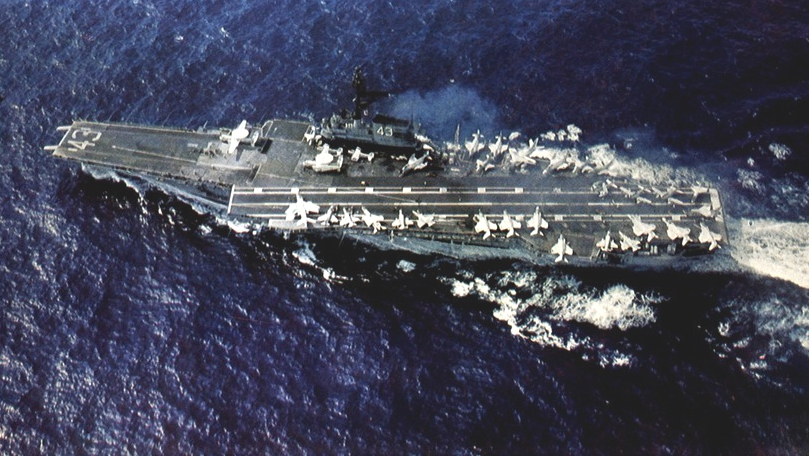
USS Coral Sea (CVA-43)

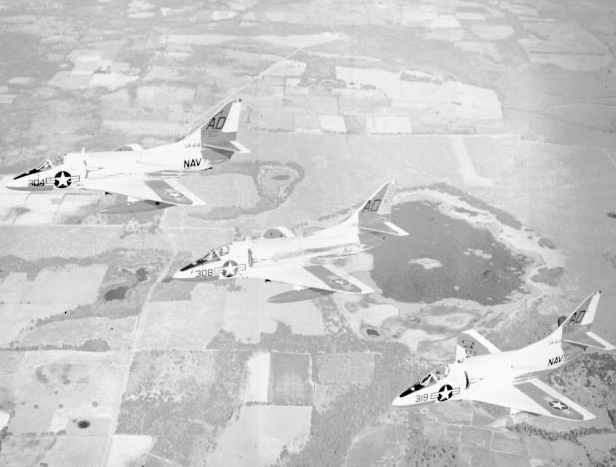
A-4 Skyhawks in flight (VA-44)

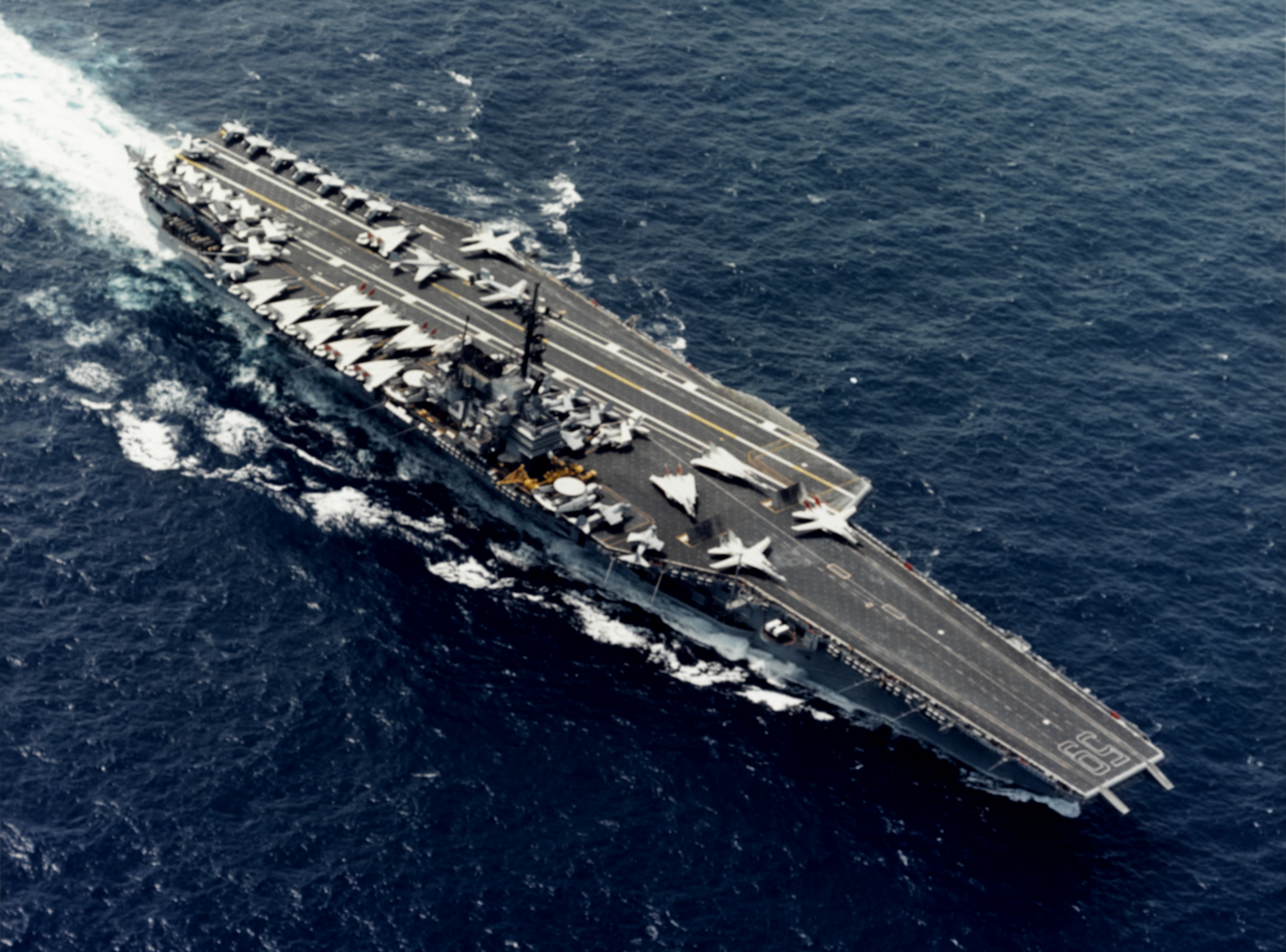
USS Forrestal (CVA-59)

== Awards and decorations ==
Included among his awards for valor and service, in addition to receiving the Navy Cross, Linder was decorated with the Silver Star four times, a Defense Superior Service Medal, four Legions of Merit, seven Distinguished Flying Crosses, a Bronze Star Medal, and twenty four Air Medals.

Naval Aviator Badge
Navy Cross		Silver Star w/ three 5/16" gold award stars	
Defense Superior Service Medal	Legion of Merit w/ Combat "V" three 5/16" Gold Stars	Distinguished Flying Cross w/ Combat "V", one 5/16" Silver Star, one 5/16" Gold Star	Bronze Star w/ Combat "V"
Air Medal w/ four 5/16" Silver Stars	Air Medal w/ two 5/16" Gold Stars and bronze Strike/flight numeral 3	Navy and Marine Corps Commendation Medal w/ Combat "V" one "5/16" Gold Star	Combat Action Ribbon w/ one 5/16" Gold Star
Navy Unit Commendation	Navy Expeditionary Medal	China Service Medal	American Campaign Medal
World War II Victory Medal	Navy Occupation Service Medal w/ 'Japan' clasp	National Defense Service Medal w/ one 3/16" Bronze Star	Korean Service Medal w/ three 3/16" Bronze Stars
Armed Forces Expeditionary Medal	Vietnam Service Medal w/ three 3/16" Bronze Stars	Navy and Marine Corps Sea Service Deployment Ribbon	Navy and Marine Corps Overseas Service Ribbon
Unidentified foreign award	Republic of Vietnam Gallantry Cross w/ ond 5/16" Gold Star and one 5/16" Silver Star	Republic of Korea Presidential Unit Citation w/ service star	Vietnam Presidential Unit Citation
Republic of Vietnam Gallantry Cross Unit Citation	United Nations Korea Medal	Vietnam Campaign Medal	Republic of Korea War Service Medal

=== Navy Cross citation ===

Linder, James Benjamin
Commander, U.S Navy
Carrier Air Wing FIFTEEN, USS CORAL SEA (CVA-43)
Date of Action: 28 September 1967

Citation:

For extraordinary heroism in aerial flight on 28 September 1967 as Commander, Carrier Air Wing FIFTEEN, embarked in USS Coral Sea (CVA-43). Commander Linder planned, led, and directed an air-wing striking force consisting of thirty-one aircraft against the heavily defended and strategically important Haiphong railway/highway bridge in North Vietnam. Although subjected to intense and accurate barrages of multi-caliber antiaircraft-artillery fire, surface-to-air missiles, and enemy interceptor aircraft, he fearlessly and skillfully directed and controlled the striking forces assigned, resolutely pressing home a devastating attack with resulted in total destruction of the bridge and marked the culmination of the comprehensive attack plan to isolate the city. As the leader of four of the previous assaults on the strategic Haiphong bridge complex, Commander Linder, by his courageous leadership, comprehensive planning, and outstanding airmanship, contributed greatly to the total success of this daring and expansive attack strategy. Tactics which were planned and executed by Commander Linder encompassed over one hundred and fifty attack sorties and were consummated in the face of scores of accurate surface-to-air missile firings and fusillades of antiaircraft fire concentrated at the targets. Despite the enemy's determined and formidable opposition, the logistic lifeline of Haiphong was effectively severed by the destruction of these key bridges without the loss of a single strike aircraft. Commander Linder's brilliant planning, consummate flight leadership, and fearless devotion to duty in the face of grave personal danger were in keeping with the highest traditions of the United States Naval Service.
