= United States Taiwan Defense Command =

Sub-unified command of the US armed forces

United States Taiwan Defense Command 美軍協防台灣司令部
- Badge of the USTDC
- Active: December 1954 – April 1979
- Country: United States
- Type: Sub-unified command
- Size: 70 troops from Combined Arms and branches
- Part of: United States Pacific Command
- Garrison/HQ: HSA Compound, Yuanshan, Taipei

Commanders
- First commander: VADM Alfred M. Pride
- Last commander: RADM James B. Linder
- First chief of staff: RADM Frank W. Fenno
- Last chief of staff: Brig Gen Dan A. Brooksher

The United States Taiwan Defense Command (USTDC; Chinese: 美軍協防台灣司令部) was a sub-unified command of the United States Armed Forces operating in Taiwan from December 1954 to April 1979.

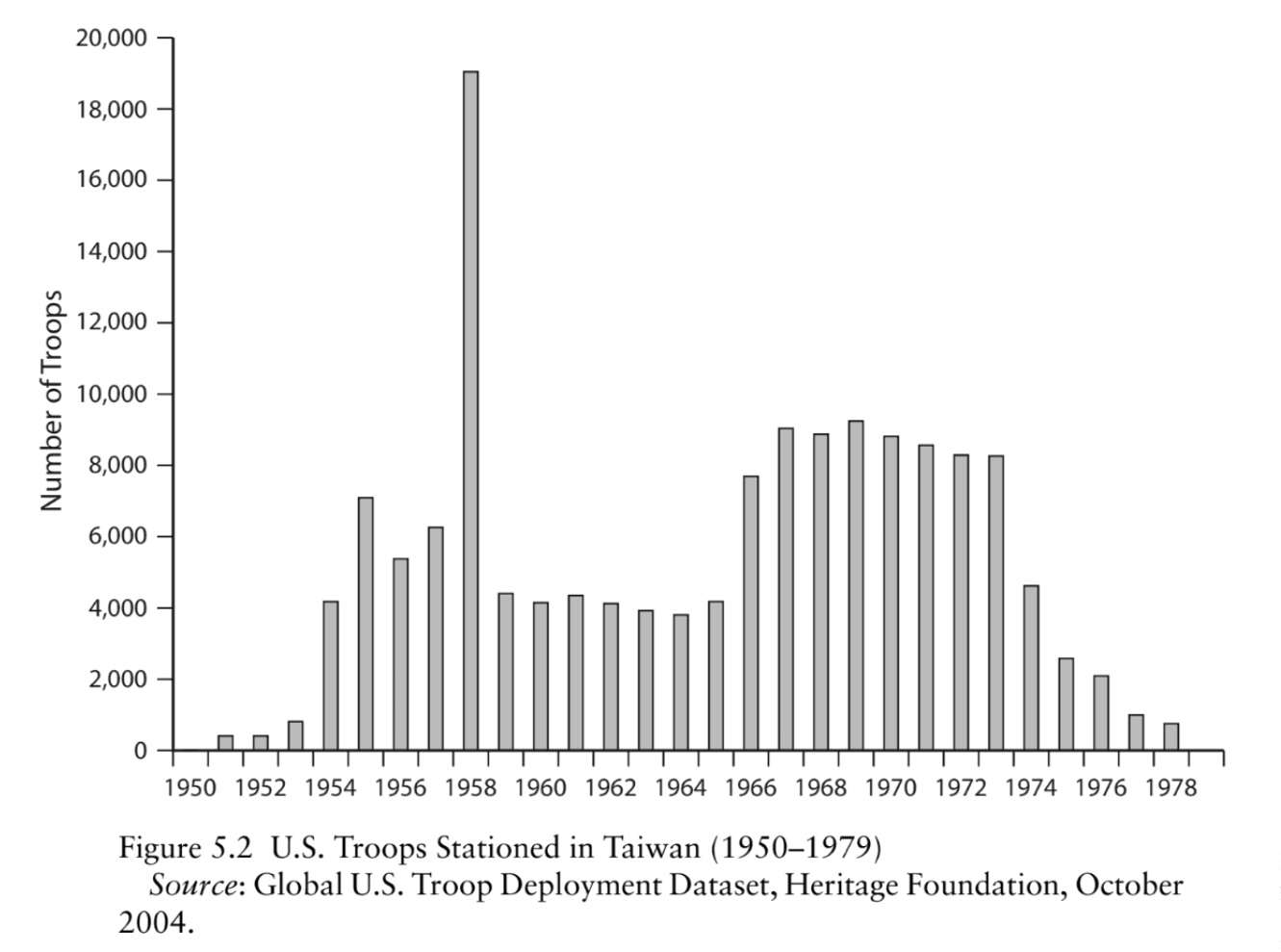
Number of U.S. Troops Stationed in Taiwan (1950–1979)

== History ==
The United States Taiwan Defense Command was originally formed as the Formosa Liaison Center (founded in 1955 after the signature of the Sino-American Mutual Defense Treaty of December 1954 and the First Taiwan Strait Crisis of Sept. 1954). In November 1955, the FLC became the Taiwan Defense Command. The command reported directly to the Commander-in-Chief Pacific (CINCPAC). The command was composed of personnel from all branches of the U.S. armed forces and had its headquarters in Taipei. The first commander of the USTDC was Alfred M. Pride, Commander, U.S. Seventh Fleet.

When the Korean War broke out in 1950, the United States Seventh Fleet routinely patrolled the Taiwan Strait until the establishment of diplomatic relations between the United States and People's Republic of China in 1979.

In 1954, the United States Seventh Fleet also dispatched a detachment to the Zuoying Military Port in Kaohsiung, Taiwan.

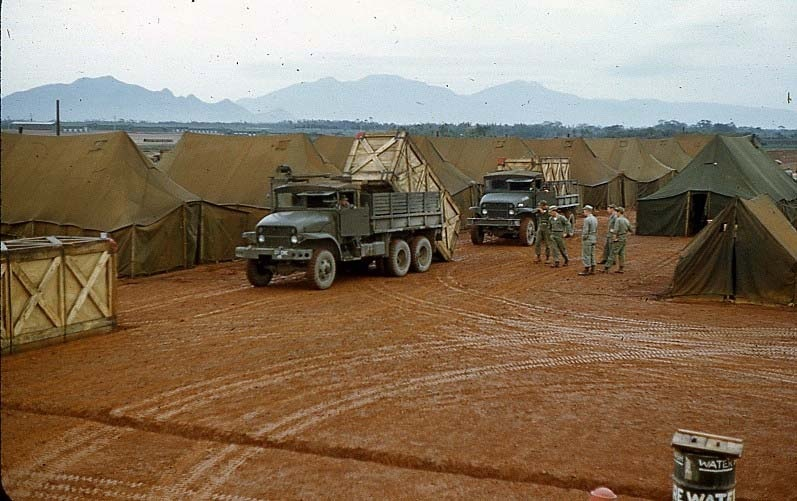
U.S. Army 327th Communications Reconnaissance Company stationed at Shu LinKou Air Station, Taipei, Taiwan, March 1955

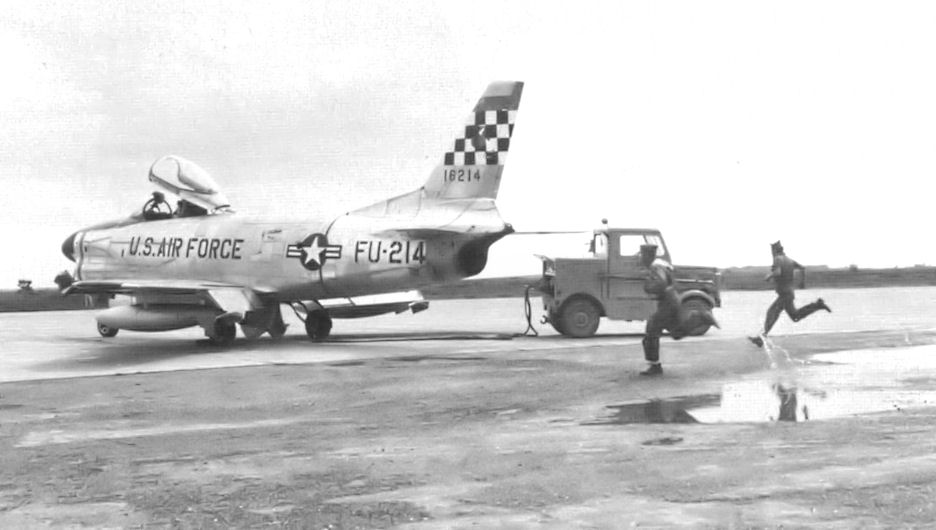
16th Fighter-Interceptor Squadron North American F-86D-35-NA Sabre 51–6214, assigned to Naha Air Base, Okinawa, deployed at Chia-Yi AFB, Taiwan, 1955

The USAF 67th Fighter-Bomber Squadron was deployed at Chiayi Air Base, Taiwan, from 27 January – 17 February 1955 and 1 July – 1 October 1955, using F-86 Sabre fighters.

The 44th Fighter-Bomber Squadron operating the F-86 Sabre was deployed to Taoyuan Air Base, Taiwan from 27 January to 17 February 1955 and again from 3–30 September 1955.

USTDC was a combined arms theater headquarters for the defense of Taiwan and the Pescadores. In the event of hostilities, the USTDC commander would have coordinated with the Government of the Republic of China in the defense of Taiwan and the Pescadores. In the event of such a contingency, three existing service commanders would have reported to the U.S. Taiwan Defense Command commander. The 327th Air Division commander would be the air component commander, the Taiwan Patrol Force commander would be the naval component commander (the Taiwan Patrol Force being drawn from the United States Seventh Fleet), and the Chief of the Military Assistance Advisory Group China would be the Army component commander. The 3rd Tactical Fighter Wing, Thirteenth Air Force, at Clark Air Base in the Philippines had reinforcement air defence functions for Taiwan for a period.

The 24th Tactical Missile Squadron was stationed at Tainan Air Base on 7 May 1957. It was equipped with MGM-1 Matador missiles. The deployment was completed in October. The 17th Tactical Missile was also equipped with MGM-1 Matador missiles The squadron also completed its deployment at Tainan Air Base in November of that year. After 1958, its designation was changed from 17th Squadron to the 868th Tactical Missile Squadron, and it continued to station at Tainan Air Force Base until June 1962. On 25 February 1958, the U.S. Air Force built a Mark 7 nuclear bomb storage facility at Tainan Air Base, and began to deploy nuclear bombs in Taiwan in 1960. The last batch was withdrawn on 31 July 1974.

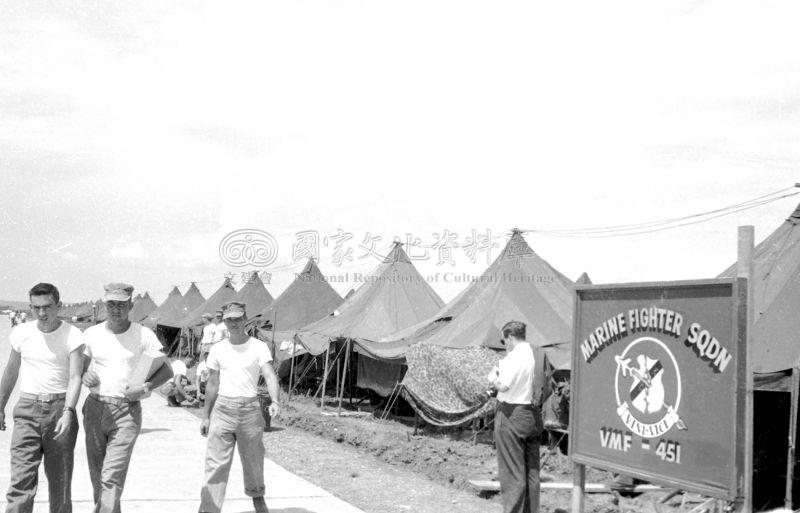
VMF-451 of the Marine Aircraft Group 11 in Pingtung Air Base, Taiwan, 19 September 1958

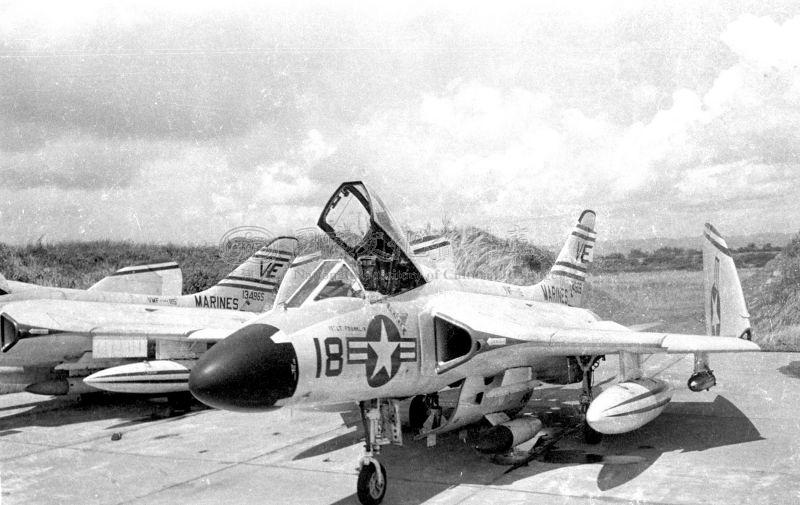
The Douglas F4D Skyray jet fighter stationed at Pingtung Air Base, Taiwan by the Marine Aircraft Group 11 of the U.S. Marine Corps, 19 September 1958

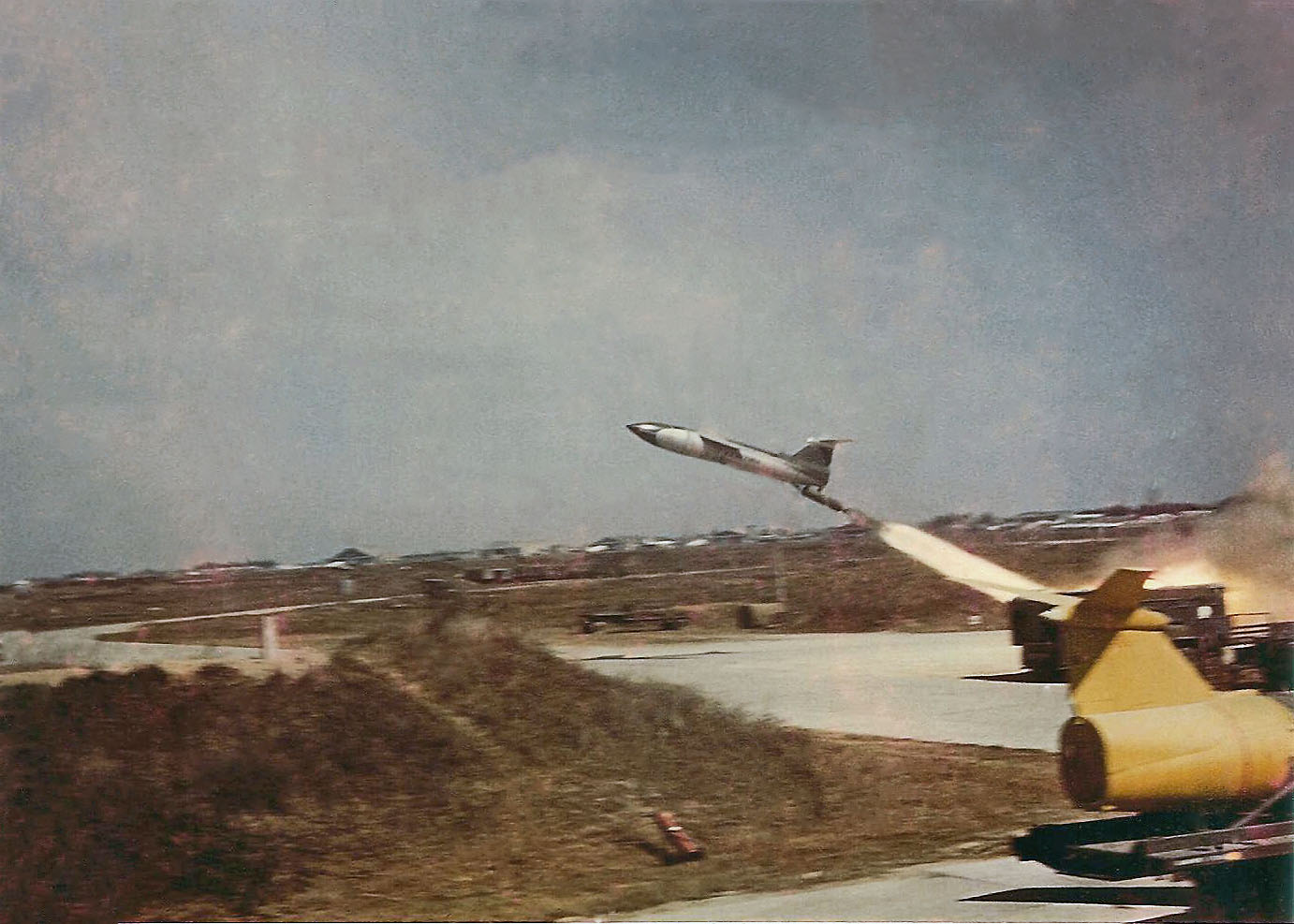
The USAF 868th Tactical Missile Squadron launched the TM-61C missile at Tainan Air Base, 1959

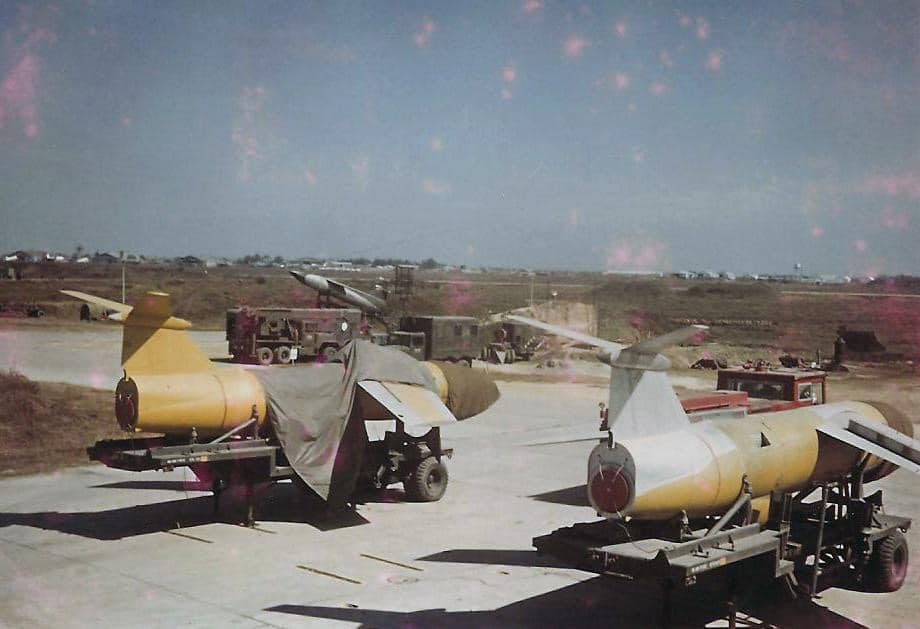
The Martin TM-61C Matador Missile in the Tainan Air Base, 1959

In August 1958, in response to the situation of the Taiwan Strait crisis, the U.S. Marine Corps Marine Aircraft Group 11 urgently stationed at Pingtung Air Base to strengthen the air defense of southern Taiwan, and was equipped with Douglas F4D Skyray and North American FJ-2/-3 Fury. The commander was Colonel Marshall, and they were not evacuated until the situation eased in January 1959.

In August 1958, U.S. Army dispatched the 71st Air Defense Artillery Regiment from Texas to Taiwan, equipped with the MIM-14 Nike Hercules.

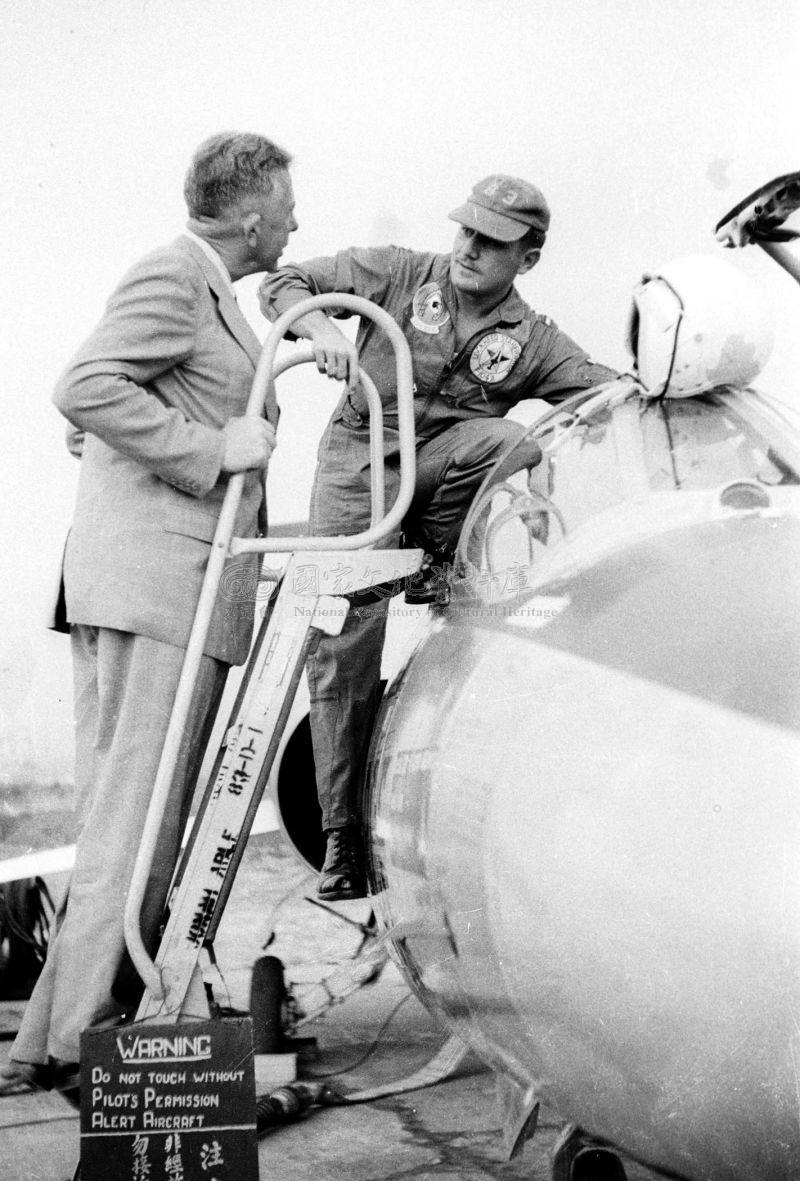
US Secretary of Defense Neil H. McElroy in Taoyuan Air Base, Taiwan, inspected the US Air Force's F-104 StarFighter in Taiwan, 12 October 1958

On 10 September 1958, as part of the U.S. response to the 1958 Quemoy Crisis, disassembled F-104A Starfighters of the 83d Fighter-Interceptor Squadron were airlifted by C-124s to Taoyuan Air Base, Taiwan, where they were reassembled as part of Operation Jonah Able. The first F-104A was operational 30 hours after arriving and by 19 September the entire squadron was operational. In October 1958 the men of the 83rd FIS were relieved by the men of the 337th Fighter-Interceptor Squadron under the command of Col. James Jabara and in December the F-104s were again disassembled and loaded aboard C-124s for return to the 83rd FIS at Hamilton Air Force Base, California.

In September 1958, the number of US troops stationed in Taiwan increased from 5,500 in 1955 to 20,000.

The 405th Fighter Wing dispatched units of the 510th Tactical Fighter Squadron equipped with F-100D Super Sabre to Tainan Air Base, in Tainan, Taiwan from November 1965 to August 1967. Later, they were transferred from Clark AB, Philippines. succeeded by 523d Tactical Fighter Squadron with F-4D fighters in Ching Chuan Kang Air Base, until August 1973.

In April 1965, the 479th Tactical Fighter Wing at George AFB, California deployed two F-104C squadrons to Ching Chuan Kang Air Base in Taichung, Taiwan (434th Tactical Fighter Squadron and 435th Tactical Fighter Squadron).

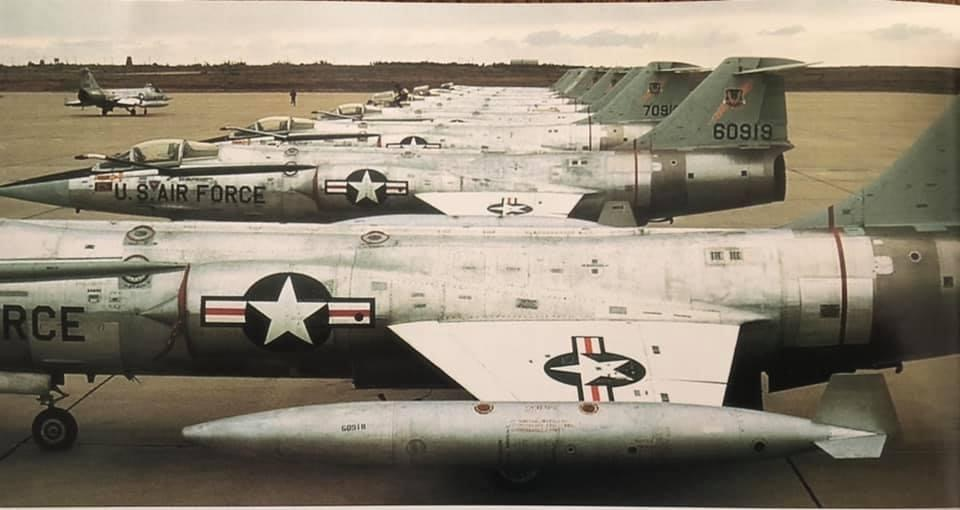
U.S. Air Force Lockheed F-104C Starfighters from the 434th Tactical Fighter Squadron, 479th Tactical Fighter Wing, at Ching Chuan Kang Air Base, Taiwan, in April 1965.

On 7 April 1965, the 552d Airborne Early Warning and Control Wing dispatched a Flight from McClellan Air Force Base, California to Tainan Air Base.

On 13 May 1966 – 21 July 1966, the VMFA-314 and VMFA-323 of the US Marine Corps Fighter/Attack Squadrons in MCAS Iwakuni, Japan were Temporary duty assignment (TDY) to Tainan Air Base. Equipped with F-4B Phantom II, they were supported logistically by the 6214th Combat Support Group in support of the 327th Air Division.

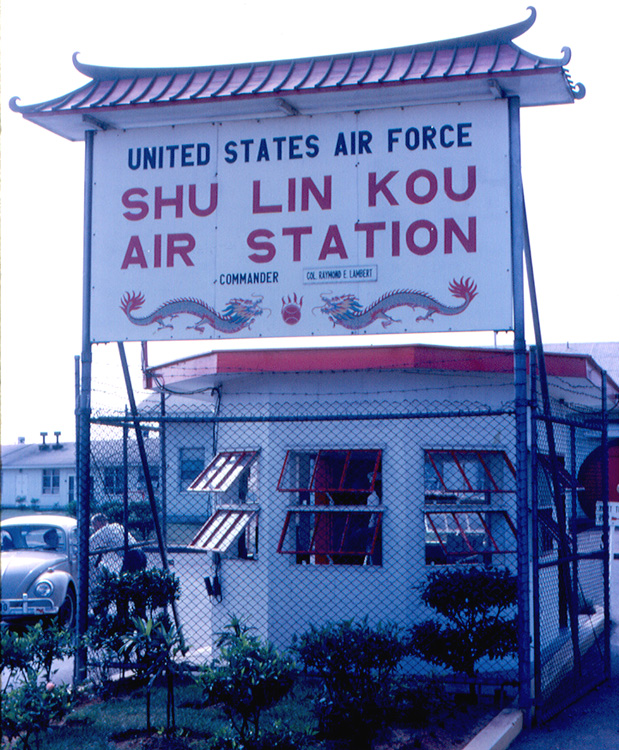
Shu Lin Kou Air Station in 1967

In May 1967, Carlos Talbott of the U.S. Air Force became chief of staff of the command. From July 1968 – September 1970 the chief of staff was Brigadier General John A. Des Portes, U.S.A.F. In September 1970, Clarence J. Douglas, also of the Air Force, assumed duties as chief of staff.

Tactical Air Command reassigned the 314th Troop Carrier Wing, with Fairchild C-123 Provider and Lockheed C-130 Hercules to CCK AB, Taiwan on 22 January 1966 from Sewart AFB, Tennessee. Two Martin EB-57 Canberras from the 347th Tactical Fighter Wing based at Yokota AB in Tokyo, Japan deployed to CCK AB, between 29 November and 8 December 1968. These aircraft provided ROC Air Defense pilots an opportunity to detect and intercept enemy aircraft that used electronic countermeasure (ECM) equipment.

The increase in the B-52 Arc Light sortie rates over Vietnam necessitated relocation of additional KC-135's which provided PACAF fighter support. In February 1968 the United States Air Force Strategic Air Command 4220th Air Refueling Squadron deployed to CCK AB, Taiwan bringing KC-135 tankers formerly based at Takhli RTAFB, Thailand and Kadena AB Okinawa.

During the peak period of the Vietnam War from 1968 to 1969, the number of US troops stationed in Taiwan gradually rose to 30,000.

The 314th TAW returned to Little Rock AFB, Arkansas in 1971. The 314th was replaced by the Fifth Air Force 374th Tactical Airlift Wing on 31 May 1971, being reassigned from Naha AB, Okinawa to Taiwan, Until 14 November 1973.

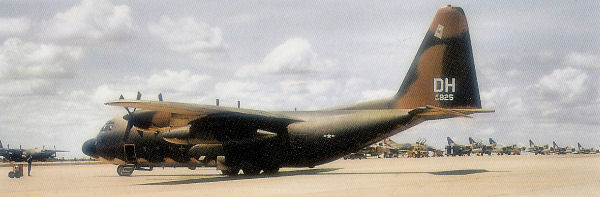
Lockheed C-130E-LM Hercules 63-7825 345th TAS/374th TAW at Ching Chuan Kang Air Base Taichung, Taiwan

The 18th Tactical Fighter Wing based at Kadena AB, Okinawa maintained a detachment of McDonnell F-4C Phantom II aircraft to Taiwan from November 1972 until May 1975.

On 6 November 1972, the 18th Tactical Fighter Wing dispatched the McDonnell Douglas F-4C/D Phantom II fighters of 44th Tactical Fighter Squadron and 67th Tactical Fighter Squadron to the Ching Chuan Kang Air Base until 31 May 1975, to assist Taiwan's air defense, defend against aerial threats from China.

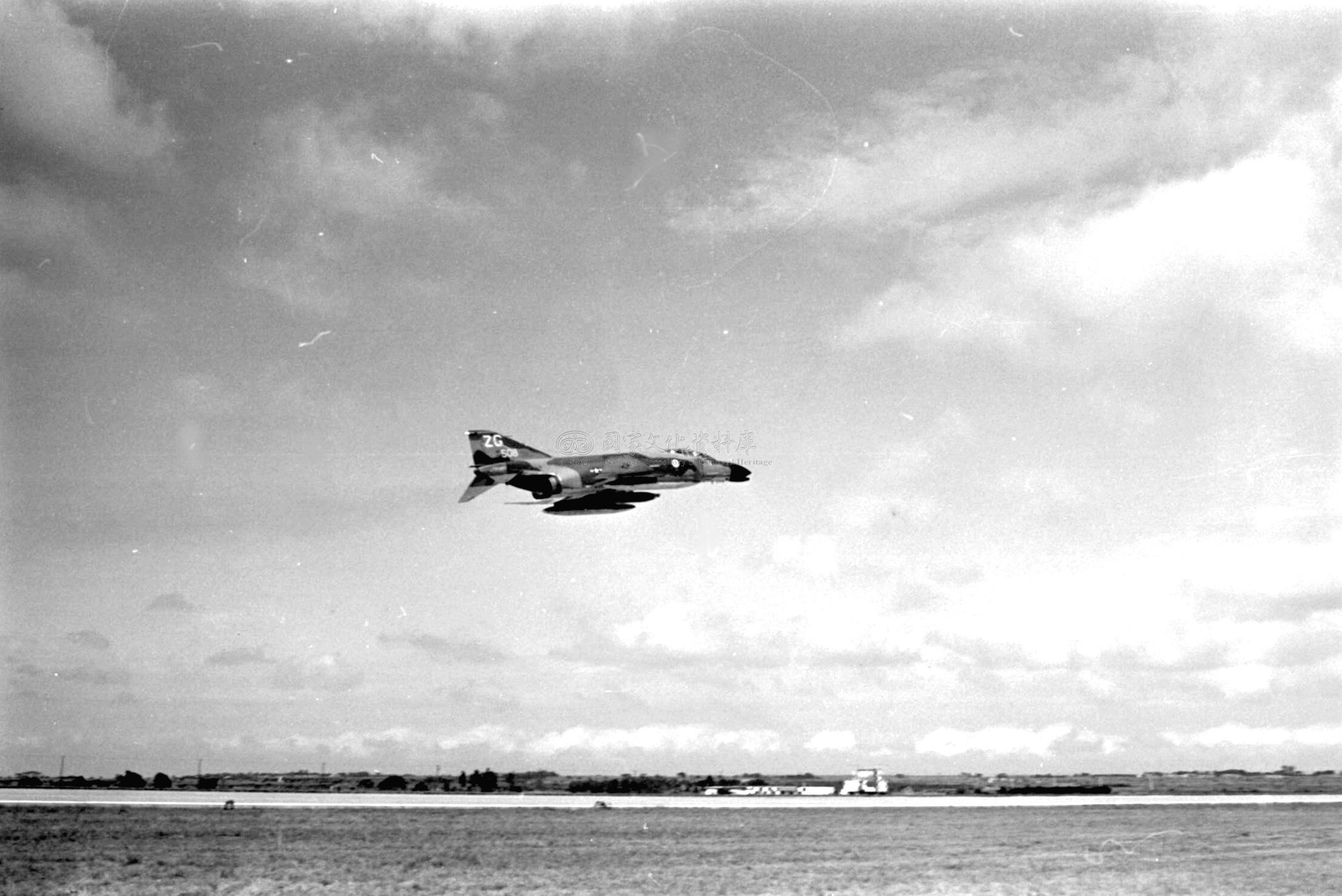
The EF-4C of the 67th Tactical Fighter Squadron took off from the Ching Chuan Kang Air Base, Taiwan for Combat air patrol, 20 November 1972

With the withdrawal of the Republic of China from the United Nations in 1971 and the change in the U.S. policy toward China, the U.S. military gradually reduced the number of troops stationed in Taiwan. Subsequently, Washington and Beijing clearly stated in the 1972 Shanghai Communiqué that the U.S. would gradually withdraw all troops and military installations from Taiwan. In April 1973, after all the US troops withdrew from South Vietnam, the number of US troops stationed in Taiwan decreased to 12,000.

In 1972 the US president ordered the withdrawal of all nuclear weapons from Taiwan.

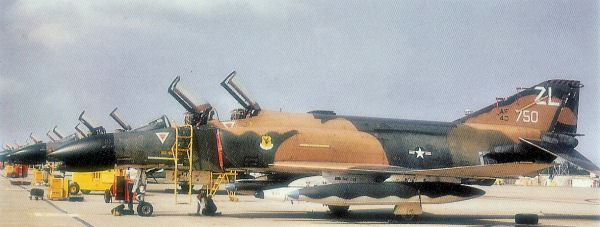
McDonnell F-4C-23-MC Phantoms of the 44th TFS/18th TFW deployed at Ching Chuan Kang Air Base Taichung, Taiwan, 2 October 1973. Serial 64–0750 in foreground.

On 31 August 1973, the F-4D fighter detachment belonging to the 523th Tactical Fighter Squadron withdrew to Clark Air Base, and was replaced by a detachment dispatched by the 90th Tactical Fighter Squadron until 31 July 1974.

After the US military withdrew from Vietnam, as airlift operations at CCK began to wind down, on 13 November 1973 the Pacific Air Forces withdrew the Lockheed C-130 Hercules of the 374th Tactical Airlift Wing from Ching Chuan Kang Air Base, total of 65 C-130E transport aircraft, 3,000 pilots and ground crew were evacuated and moved to the Clark Air Base, Philippine.

10 June 1974, Brigadier General David O. Williams Jr., Chief of Staff of the U.S. Taiwan Defense Command, formulated a drawdown plan for the U.S. troops stationed in Taiwan until 2 May 1976.

In September 1974, there were only 5,800 US troops stationed in Taiwan. On 26 March 1975, the US military advisory team stationed in Matsu, Kinmen, was withdrew, and the withdrawal of the 7th Fleet Detachment from the Zuoying Military Port in Kaohsiung, Taiwan.

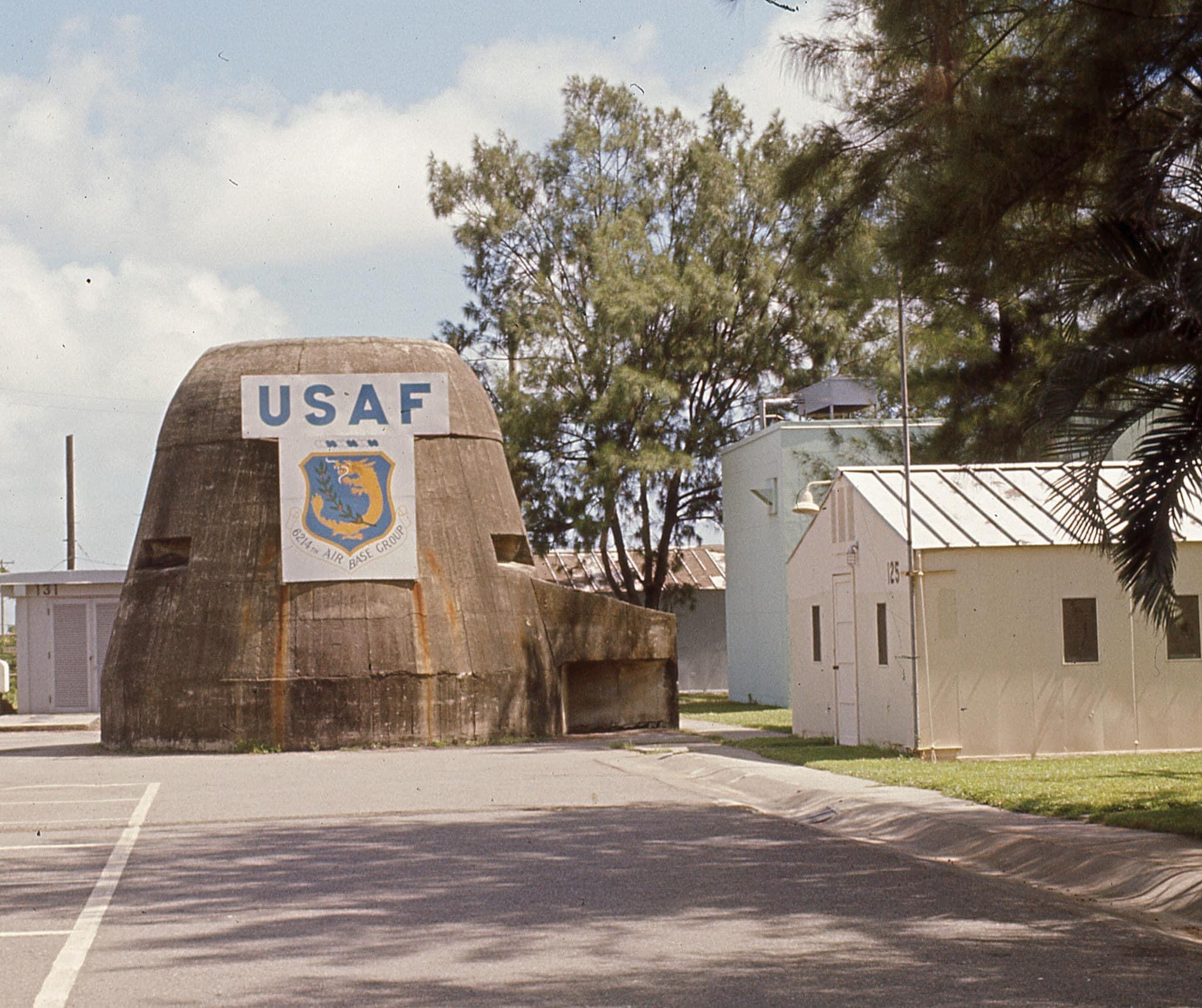
In Tainan Air Base is marked with the US Air Force's Insignia of the 6214th Air Base Group, 30 October 1974

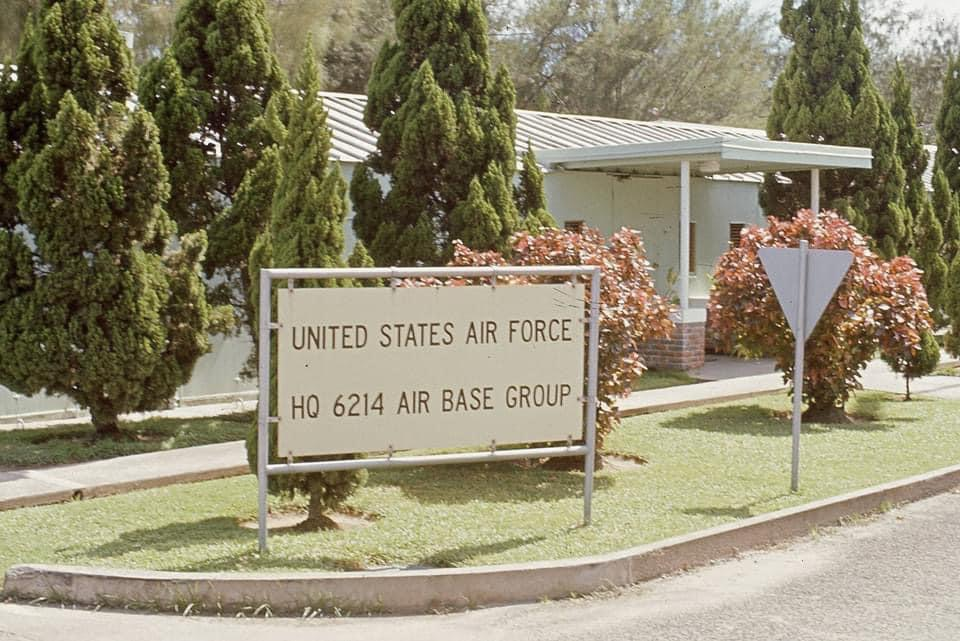
Headquarters of the 6214th Air Base Group in Tainan Air Base, 30 October 1974

Tainan Air Base had been phased down to caretaker status by the end of 1974.

On 10 April 1975, the 44th Tactical Fighter Squadron of the 18th Tactical Fighter Wing withdrew from Ching Chuan Kang Air Base in Taichung, Taiwan, total of 24 McDonnell F-4C/D Phantom II fighters and 450 pilots and ground crews to Kadena Air Base in Okinawa.

In May 1975, the 67th Tactical Fighter Squadron was withdrawn from CCK AB (Ching Chuan Kang Air Base), Taiwan, with the final squadron of 18 F-4Cs departing for Kadena Air Base, Okinawa, between 27 and 31 May. By June, CCK AB had also been placed in caretaker status.

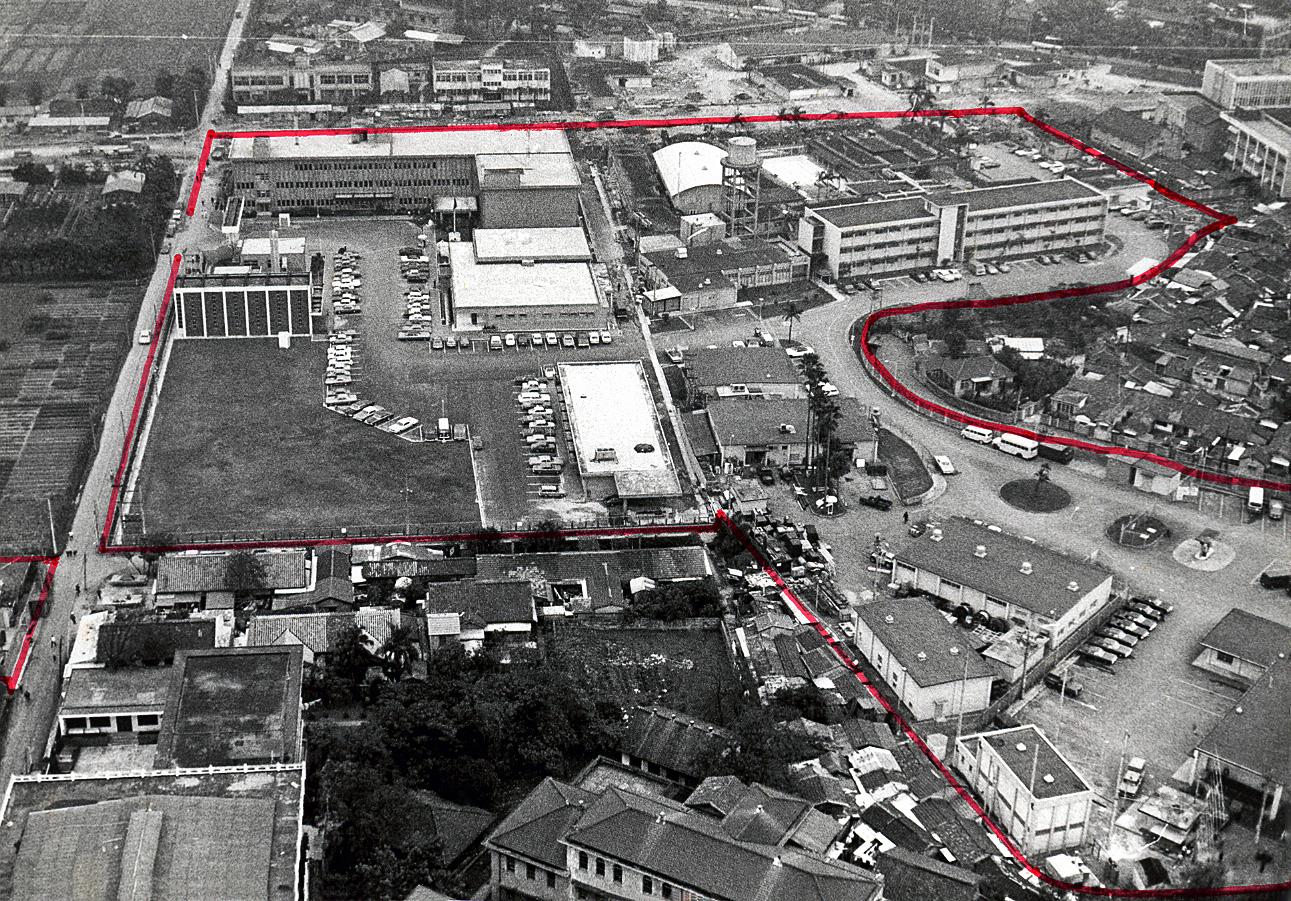
Taipei Air Station, headquarters of 327th Air Division, in 1975

As of 31 July 1975, the number of U.S. troops stationed in Taiwan was 3,098. They were 1,684 in the Air Force, 519 in the Army, 450 in the Navy, 283 in the Joint Commands, 79 civilian personnel of the U.S. Department of Defense and the Central Intelligence Agency, and 55 in the Military Assistance Advisory Group, and 28 in the Military Attache Office of the U.S. Embassy in Republic of China (Taiwan).

On 7 January 1976, with the dissolution of 327th Air Division, and Taipei Air Station was shut down, the number of US troops stationed in Taiwan was reduced to 1,400. As of the end of 1977 (31 December), the size was 1,200, including 949 military personnel. And the rest of the civilian staff.

In January 1976, Chiayi Air Base was to be shut down and the 6215th Support Squadron was disbanded.

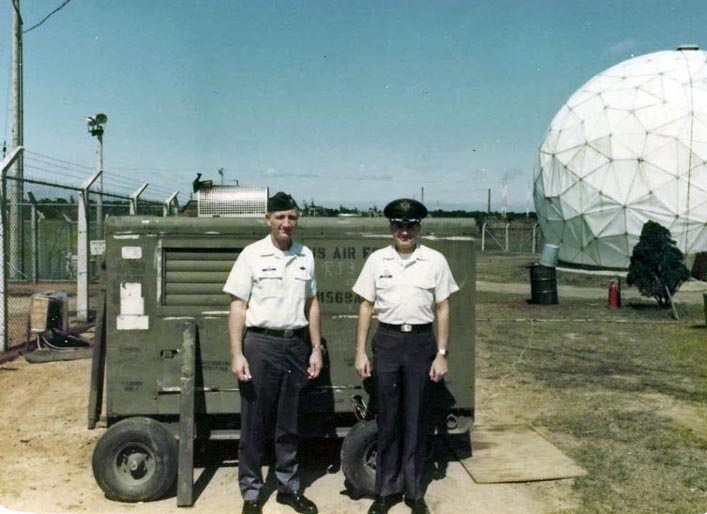
Colonel James E. Kater (left), Shulinkou Air Station, Taiwan, 6987th Security Group Commander (1974/75-1 April 1977), and Lt. Colonel Jerome M. Wucher, Vice Group Commander (Operations Commander), in 1976

On 26 May 1976, the newly appointed commander of the Military Assistance Advisory Group, Taiwan was demoted from major general to brigadier general, and on 26 September 1977, was demoted to colonel.

In August 1977, the newly appointed commander of the United States Taiwan Defense Command was demoted from Vice admiral to Rear admiral.

As of 30 September 1978 (the end of the fiscal year), the number of US troops stationed in Taiwan was 753. According to the number of services, they were 357 in the Air Force, 209 in the Navy, 176 in the Army, and 11 in the Marine Corps.

On 1 January 1979, the United States and the People's Republic of China established diplomatic relations.

On 1 March 1979, the Military Assistance Advisory Group, Taiwan was dissolved, the last commander, Colonel Hadley N. Thompson, depart Taiwan on 26 April 1979.

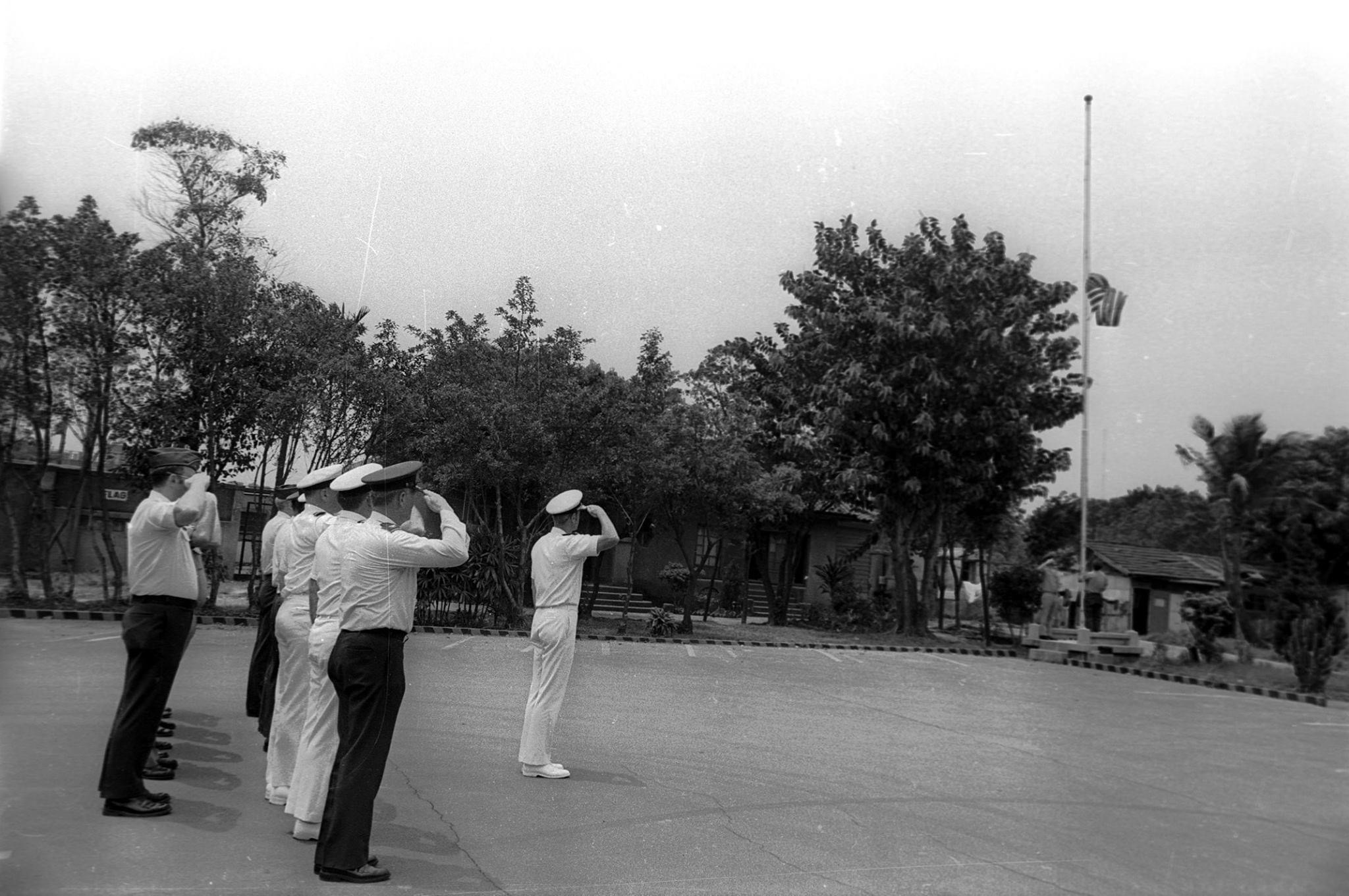
On 28 April 1979, the U.S. flag was lowered for the last time in front of the U.S. Taiwan Defense Command. Rear Admiral James Linder, USTDC Commander, presided over this ceremony, just as he'd already done at other U.S. military units in Taiwan. Marine SSG D. J. Gemmecke lowered the colors, Shortly after the ceremony, Admiral and Mrs. Linder departed the country, from Songshan Airport to Camp H. M. Smith, Hawaii, United States Pacific Command

The Command held its final flag retreat ceremony during the afternoon of 26 April 1979. Rear Admiral James B. Linder was the last USTDC commander to depart Taiwan on 28 April 1979, and the last U.S. soldier left Taiwan on 3 May 1979.

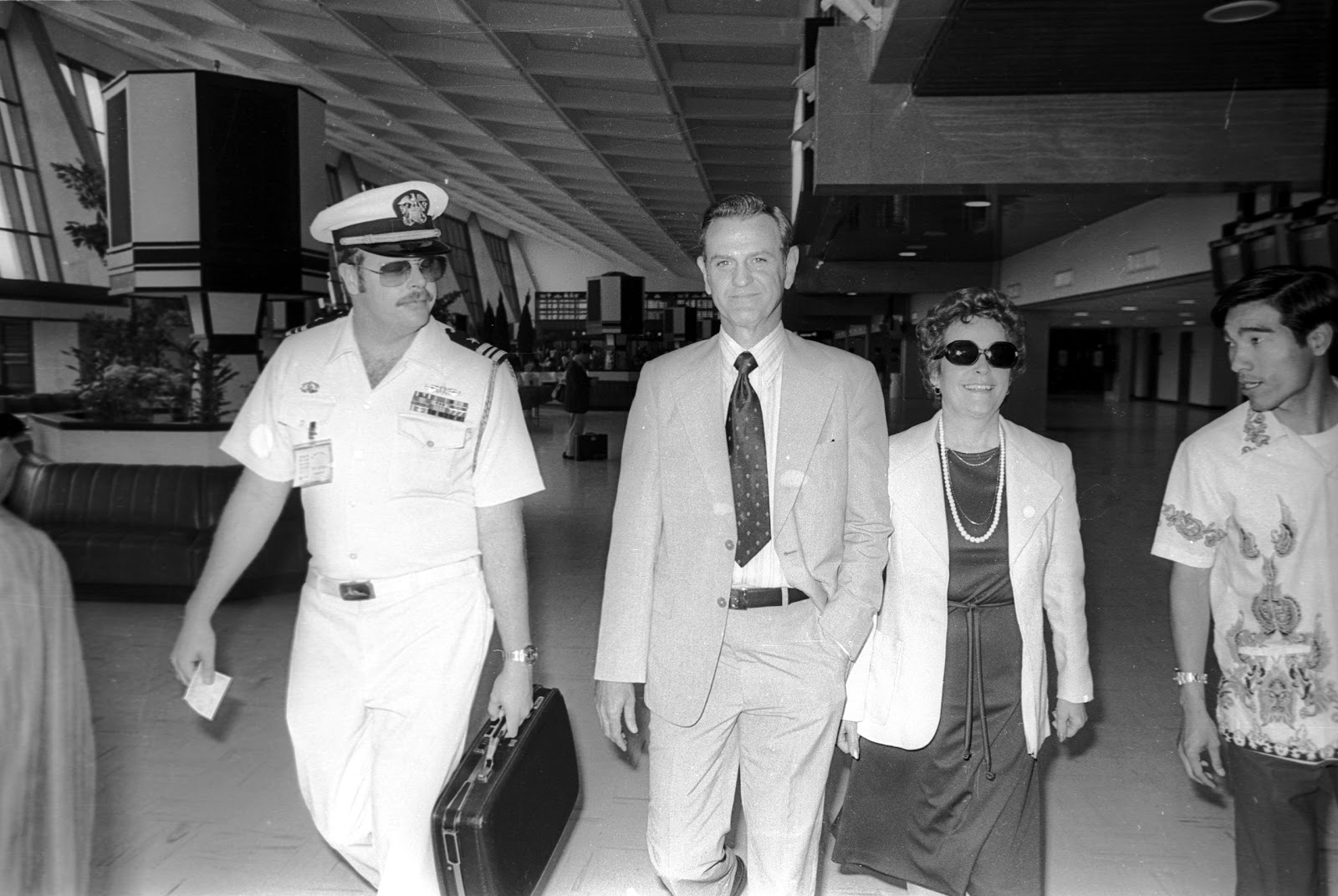
On April 28, 1979, Rear Admiral and Mrs. Linder departed Taipei following the closure of the U.S. Taiwan Defense Command, the officer to the left of RADM Linder is LCDR Julian M. Wright, Jr, the admiral's aide at USTDC

The former site of the USTDC headquarters became the Taipei Fine Arts Museum in 1983.

=== Number of U.S. soldiers stationed in Taiwan by year ===
Year	Number
1950	11
1951	411
1952	411
1953	811
1954	4,174
1955	7,093
1956	5,379
1957	6,261
1958	19,044
1959	4,402
1960	4,147
1961	4,349
1962	4,121
1963	3,923
1964	3,802
1965	4,175
1966	7,689
1967	9,038
1968	8,874
1969	9,243
1970	8,813
1971	8,565
1972	8,289
1973	8,267
1974	4,619
1975	2,584
1976	2,090
1977	995
1978	753
1979	0
2021	>24
2022	>30
2023	41
2024	41+
2025	~500

== Forces earmarked for the TDC ==
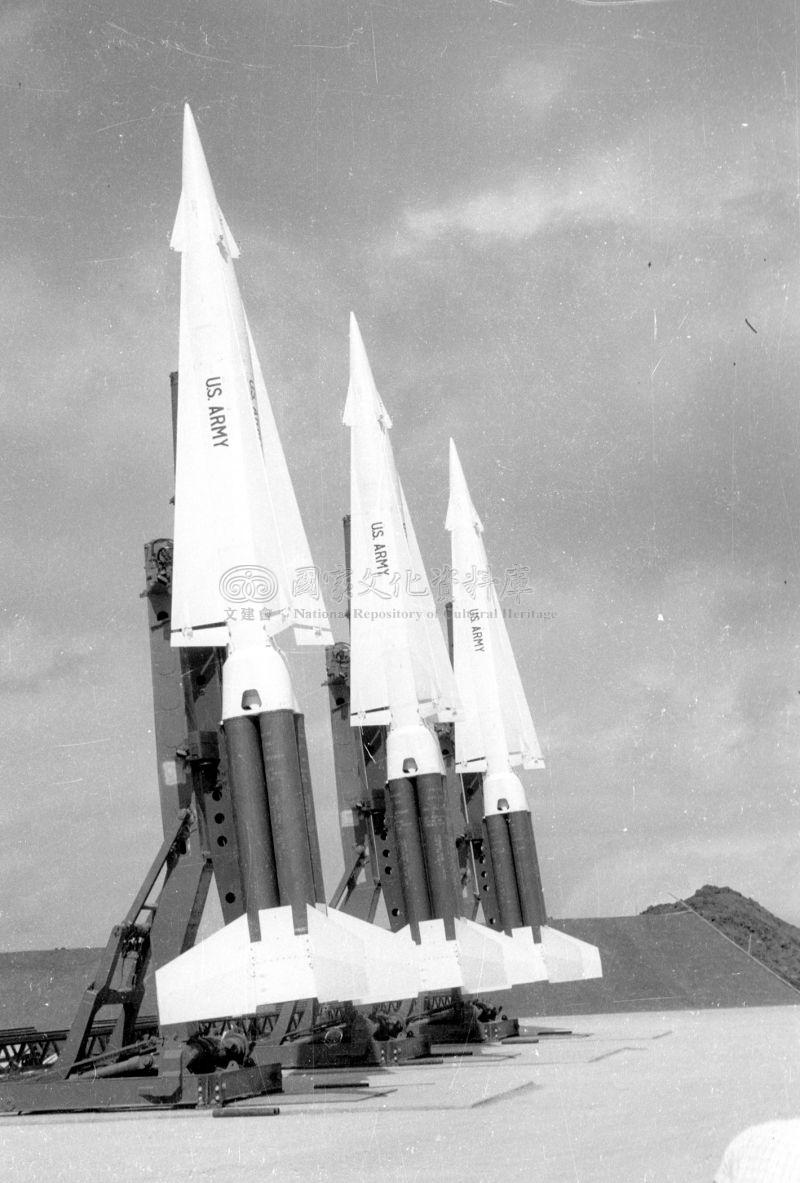
Nike Hercules missiles of the 71st Air Defense Artillery Regiment at Tamsui Missile Base in 1958

The USTDC commanded a total of about 9,000 troops, including 4,000 infantry troops drawn from Army and Marine battalions, including an airborne battalion of the 82nd Airborne Division, 4 attack submarines, 5 navy frigates, 7 navy missile boats, a naval air wing comprising a Marine bomber squadron of 18 Douglas A-4 Skyhawk ground attack aircraft, 21 transport and SAR helicopters, 12 Kaman SH-2 Seasprite ASW helicopters and nine Lockheed P-3 Orion maritime patrol aircraft; a joint Army-Marine artillery group comprising a brigade fielding 203 mm and 155 mm self propelled and towed guns plus one battalion of MGR-1 Honest John rockets and MGM-29 Sergeant surface-to-surface missiles, and two Marine tank battalions fielding the M48 Patton tank.

The USAF component included 4 squadrons (72 aircraft) of North American F-100 Super Sabre and Republic F-105 Thunderchief air superiority fighters, After 1972, there were two F-4 squadrons transferred from Kadena Air Base to Ching Chuan Kang Air Base, a Squadron of Nine Lockheed AC-130 ground attack aircraft, three KC-130 aerial refueling tankers, an EW and recon wing of a lone Lockheed RC-130 Hercules and a lone Boeing RC-135 aircraft. and a squadron of three Lockheed C-141 Starlifter heavy strategic airlifters and six Lockheed C-130 Hercules tactical airlifters.

== List of commanders ==
Name	Rank	Portrait	Tenure
Alfred M. Pride	Vice Admiral		April 1955 – November 1955
Stuart H. Ingersoll	Vice Admiral		November 1955 – July 1957
Austin K. Doyle	Vice Admiral		July 1957 – September 1958
Roland N. Smoot	Vice Admiral		September 1958 – May 1962
Charles L. Melson	Vice Admiral		May 1962 – July 1964
William E. Gentner Jr.	Vice Admiral		July 1964 – July 1967
John L. Chew	Vice Admiral		July 1967 – August 1970
Walter H. Baumberger	Vice Admiral		August 1970 – September 1972
Philip A. Beshany	Vice Admiral		September 1972 – August 1974
Edwin K. Snyder	Vice Admiral		August 1974 – July 1977
James B. Linder	Rear Admiral		July 1977 – April 1979

== List of Chiefs of Staff ==
Name	Rank	Portrait	Tenure	
Frank W. Fenno	Rear Admiral		1955 – 1956	
Charles Cochran Kirkpatrick	Rear Admiral		1956 – 1957	
Harold Huntley Bassett	Major general		1957 – August 1958	
Neil D. Van Sickle	Major general		October 1958 – 1959	
William G. Lee Jr.	Brigadier general		1959 – August 1960	
Robert Francis Worden	Brigadier general		August 1960 – August 1962	
Frederick J. Suterlin	Brigadier general		23 August 1962 – August 1964	
Kenneth O.Sanborn	Major general		1964 – 1967	
Carlos Talbott	Major general		May 1967 – September 1968	
John A. Des Portes	Brigadier general		September 1968 – September 1970	
Clarence J. Douglas Jr.	Brigadier general		September 1970 – August 1972	
William C. Burrows	Major general		August 1972 – June 1974	
David O. Williams Jr.	Brigadier general		June 1974 – April 1976	
Dan A. Brooksher	Brigadier general		April 1976 – July 1978	The last chief of staff, no more candidates for chief of staff after leaving Taiwan

== See also ==
- American defense of Taiwan
- Taiwan–United States relations
- Sino-American Mutual Defense Treaty
- Military Assistance Advisory Group
- United States Forces Japan
- United States Forces Korea
