= VA-76 (U.S. Navy) =

Attack Squadron 76
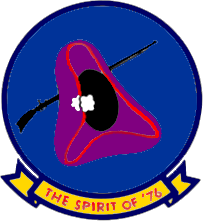
- VA-76 squadron patch
- Active: 1 June 1955 – 30 September 1969
- Country: United States
- Branch: United States Navy
- Role: Attack aircraft
- Part of: Inactive
- Nickname: Spirits
- Engagements: Korean War; Vietnam War

Aircraft flown
- Attack: F2H Banshee; F9F Panther; A-4 Skyhawk

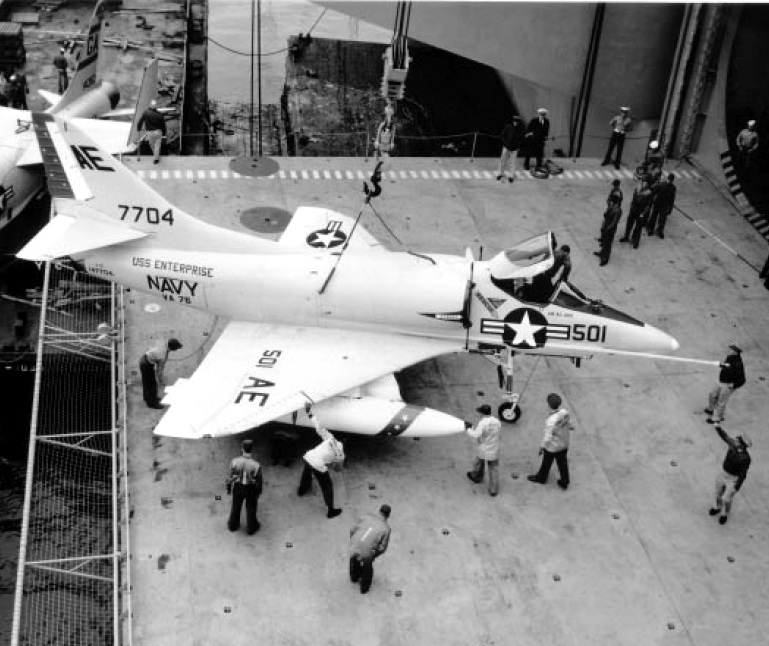
A Skyhawk from VA-76 is loaded aboard the USS Enterprise (CVAN-65) in 1963.

VA-76 was an Attack Squadron of the United States Navy. It was established on 1 June 1955 and disestablished on 30 September 1969. The squadron was nicknamed the Spirits, from its motto Fighting Spirits of 76.

== Significant events ==
- Nov–Dec 1956: The squadron operated from USS Forrestal (CVA-59) off the coast of the Azores during the Suez Crisis, awaiting a call to enter the Mediterranean if necessary.
- Jun 1961: The squadron deployed aboard USS Intrepid (CVA-11) and operated in the Caribbean during the crisis in the Dominican Republic that followed the assassination of dictator Rafael Trujillo.
- 19 Oct – 8 Dec 1962: The squadron deployed aboard USS Enterprise (CVAN-65) and operated in the Caribbean during the Cuban Missile Crisis and naval blockade.
- Mar 1964: Conducted operations in the vicinity of Cyprus during a conflict in that country between Turkish and Greek Cypriots.
- 31 Jul – 3 Oct 1964: While embarked in Enterprise, the squadron participated in Operation Sea Orbit, the first circumnavigation of the world by a nuclear task force. The sixty-five-day voyage was accomplished without replenishment. The squadron participated in numerous air power demonstrations during the voyage.
- 8–25 Feb 1965: A detachment of the squadron's A- 4C Skyhawks, configured with Sidewinder missiles, was embarked in USS Essex (CVS-9) for an Atlantic Fleet exercise. The aircraft were used for limited daylight fighter protection for embarked ASW aircraft.
- 29 May – 15 Jun 1965: While temporarily based ashore at Naval Station Roosevelt Roads, Puerto Rico, the squadron flew armed reconnaissance sorties during the Dominican Civil War.
- 11 May 1966: The squadron's commanding officer, Commander James B. Linder, was awarded the Silver Star for leading the squadron on a strike against a mobile SAM site at Thanh Hoa, North Vietnam.
- 6 Dec 1966: The squadron's commanding officer, Commander A. D. McFall, was killed when his aircraft crashed following a night launch from USS Bon Homme Richard (CVA-31).
- 1 May 1967: During a sortie against Kép Air Base, Lieutenant Commander Theodore R. Swartz shot down a MiG-17 with air-to-ground rockets. This was the first, and only, MiG aircraft to be downed by an A-4 Skyhawk during the Vietnam War. Lieutenant Commander Swartz received the Silver Star for his action.
- 14 Jul 1967: The squadron's commanding officer, Commander R. B. Fuller, was shot down during a sortie over North Vietnam. He was released from captivity on 4 March 1973 following 27 January 1973 ceasefire agreement with North Vietnam.

== Home port assignments ==
The squadron was assigned to these home ports, effective on the dates shown:

- NAS Oceana – 1 Jun 1955
- NAS Lemoore – 24 Aug 1966

== Aircraft assignment ==
The squadron first received the following aircraft on the dates shown:

- F2H-2 Banshee – Jul 1955
- F9F-8 Cougar – 6 Jan 1956
- F9F-8B Cougar – Apr 1956
- A4D-2 Skyhawk – 27 May 1959
- A4D-2N Skyhawk – 2 Mar 1962

== See also ==
- Attack aircraft
- List of inactive United States Navy aircraft squadrons
- History of the United States Navy
