= Aubrey Fitch =

United States Navy admiral (1883–1978)

Aubrey Wray Fitch
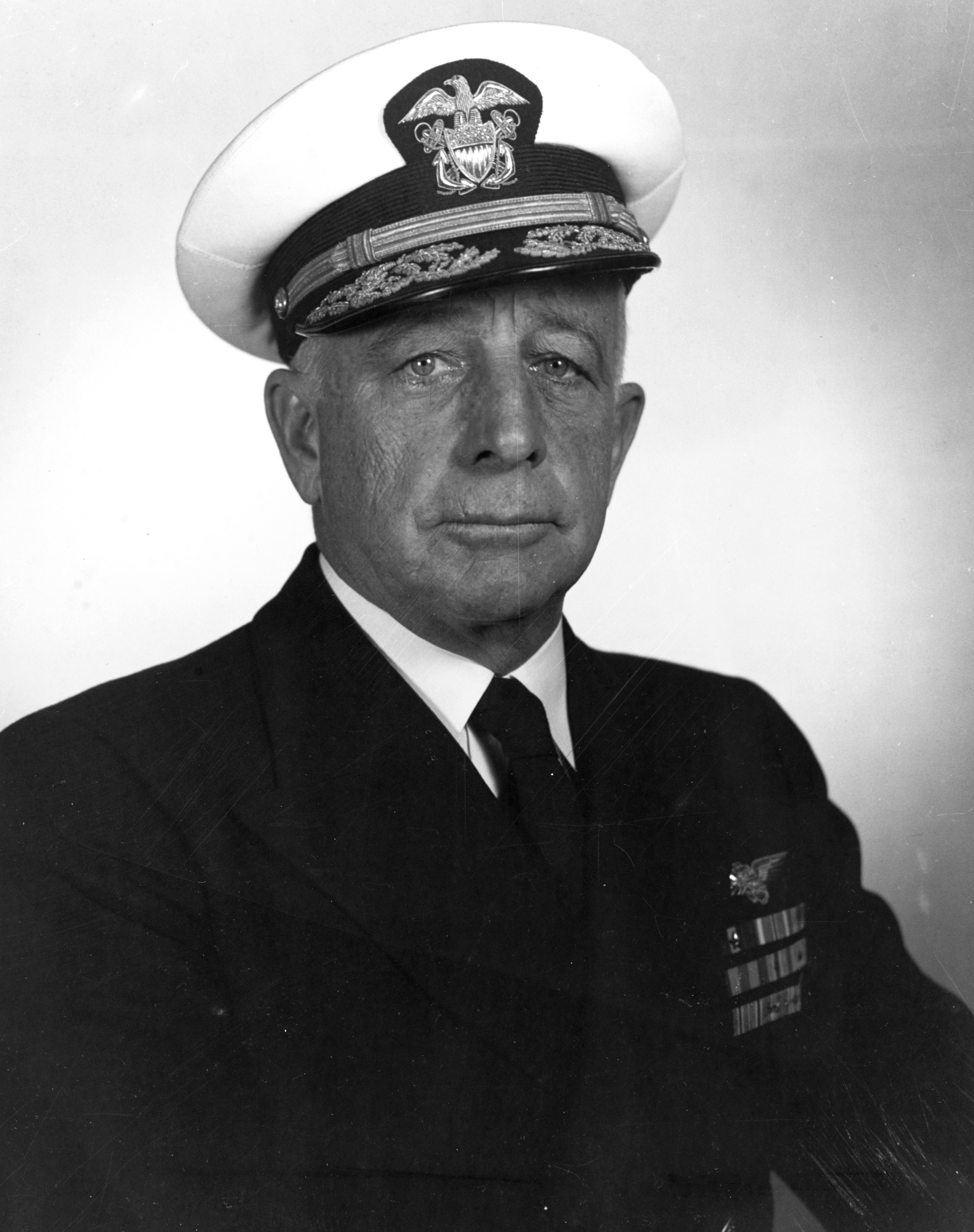
- VADM Aubrey W. Fitch, USN (March 18, 1946)
- Born: June 11, 1883; Saint Ignace, Michigan, U.S.
- Died: May 22, 1978 (aged 94); Newcastle, Maine, U.S.
- Burial place: Maine
- Military career
- Allegiance: United States of America
- Branch: United States Navy
- Service years: 1906–1947
- Rank: Admiral
- Commands: USS Terry; USS Yankton; USS Luce; USS Mahan; USS Arctic; USS Wright; USS Langley; NAS Hampton Roads; USS Lexington; NAS Pensacola; Patrol Wing 2 Carrier Division 1 Aircraft, South Pacific Force
- Conflicts: World War I; World War II; Battle of the Coral Sea; Battle of Santa Cruz Islands; Naval Battle of Guadalcanal
- Awards: Navy Distinguished Service Medal; Distinguished Flying Cross; Legion of Merit
- Other work: United States Naval Academy, Superintendent

Aubrey Wray Fitch (June 11, 1883 – May 22, 1978) was an admiral of the United States Navy during World War II. A naval aviator, he held important aviation-related commands both at sea and on shore from the 1920s onward. He also served as superintendent of the United States Naval Academy.

== Early life and career ==
Fitch was born in Saint Ignace, Michigan, on June 11, 1883. He entered the U.S. Naval Academy in the summer of 1902 and graduated on February 12, 1906. His Naval Academy classmates included Arthur L. Bristol, William L. Calhoun, William A. Glassford, Charles C. Hartigan, Frank J. Fletcher, Robert L. Ghormley, Isaac C. Kidd, John S. McCain Sr., Leigh Noyes, Ferdinand L. Reichmuth, John H. Towers, Russell Willson, and Thomas Withers. After serving the two years of sea duty then required by law before being commissioned (serving on the armored cruiser Pennsylvania and the torpedo boat Chauncey), Fitch became an ensign on February 13, 1908. He then served afloat on Rainbow and Concord before receiving instruction in torpedoes at the Naval Torpedo Station, Newport, Rhode Island, in the school conducted on board the old cruiser Montgomery.

Upon completion of the torpedo course, Fitch helped to fit out the battleship Delaware, which commissioned on April 4, 1910, before returning to Annapolis for consecutive tours of duty at the Naval Academy, first as assistant discipline officer between 1911 and 1912 and later as an instructor of physical training from 1912 to 1913. Service in the destroyers Balch and Duncan followed before he received his first sea command, the destroyer Terry, with the 2nd Division, Reserve Torpedo Flotilla, Atlantic Fleet.

After serving on the staff of the commander in chief, Atlantic Fleet, Fitch assumed command of the yacht Yankton in January 1915, with additional duty as aide to the commander in chief.

== World War I and afterward ==
Relieved of command of Yankton shortly after the United States entered World War I in the spring of 1917, Fitch continued his staff duties for another five months before joining Wyoming to serve as her gunnery officer for the remainder of hostilities, as that dreadnought operated with the 6th Battle Squadron, Grand Fleet.

After the armistice, Fitch again served at the Naval Academy once more before becoming, concurrently, inspector of ordnance in charge of the Hingham Naval Ammunition Depot in Hingham, MA, and naval inspector of ordnance in charge at the Naval Coaling Station, Frenchman Bay, Maine. From August 1920, Fitch commanded a division of fast minelayers, while also commanding in turn Luce and Mahan.

Detached from Mahan in December 1922, Fitch served at Rio de Janeiro until March 1927 as a member of the United States mission to Brazil before reporting back to the Navy Department for a brief tour of duty in Washington, D.C. Going to sea as executive officer of Nevada in May 1927, Fitch assumed command of Arctic (a type of ship sometimes known uncomplimentarily as a "beef boat") in November of that year.

== Aviation ==
He reported for aviation instruction at the Naval Air Station Pensacola, Florida, in June 1929 and there won his wings as a naval aviator on February 4, 1930. Following brief duty at NAS San Diego, California, Fitch assumed command of the USS Wright in the spring of 1930. Relieved from that billet a little over a year later (July 1931), he then began a year as commanding officer of the Navy's first aircraft carrier, Langley.

After commanding NAS Hampton Roads, Virginia, until June 1935 Fitch reported as chief of staff to commander, Aircraft, Battle Force, and remained in that billet until assuming command of Lexington (CV-2) in April 1936. Subsequently, attending the Naval War College, Newport, Rhode Island, from June 1937 to May 1938, Fitch completed the senior course there before assuming command of NAS Pensacola, in June 1938. In the spring of 1940, he took over the reins of Patrol Wing 2, based at Pearl Harbor, and seven months later, broke his flag in Saratoga as commander, Carrier Division 1. The outbreak of hostilities in the Pacific in December 1941 thus found Fitch one of the most experienced carrier commanders afloat.

== World War II ==
Fitch's flagship, Saratoga, figured prominently in the abortive attempt to reinforce Wake Island in December 1941 and was later torpedoed off Oahu in late January 1942, seriously cutting American carrier strength in the Pacific at a critical period.

Rear Admiral Fitch relieved Vice Admiral Wilson Brown on April 3, 1942, breaking his flag in Lexington, his former command. During the Battle of the Coral Sea, Fitch served as the Commander Task Group 17.5, consisting of "Lady Lex" and the Yorktown (CV-5), and was named Officer in Tactical Command (O.T.C.) by Task Force commander Admiral Frank J. Fletcher. That engagement, the first in history where neither side came within surface gun range of the other, effectively stopped the Japanese thrust at the strategic Port Moresby, but resulted in the first loss of an American aircraft carrier in the war— the USS Lexington, sunk on May 8, 1942.

The admiral then shifted his flag to Minneapolis, which was also flagship of Task Force 17 (TF 17). Fitch together with Captain Frederick C. Sherman and the Lexington's executive officer, Commander Morton T. Seligman, visited "Lady Lex"'s wounded in Minneapolis' sickbay—an action that "contributed in no small measure to the patients' well-being." For the leadership he exhibited during the Battle of the Coral Sea, Fitch was awarded his first Distinguished Service Medal.

He again broke his flag in his former flagship, Saratoga, but the task group formed around that ship arrived too late to take part in the pivotal Battle of Midway.

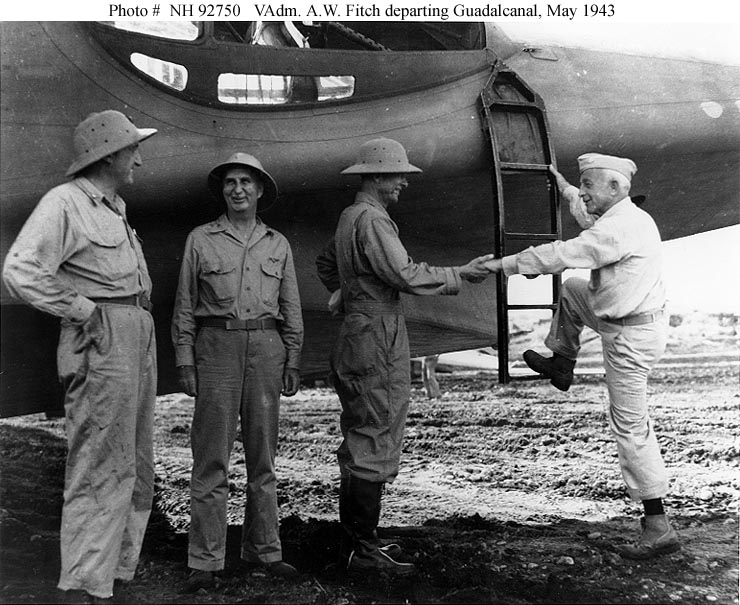
Vice Admiral Aubrey W. Fitch, USN, Commander, Aircraft, South Pacific Force, boards a PBY-5A aircraft at Guadalcanal (right). c.1943

On September 20, 1942, six weeks after the first American amphibious operation of the war got underway at Guadalcanal, Fitch assumed command of Aircraft, South Pacific Force. Not a desk-bound admiral, he carried out numerous, hazardous flights into the combat zones, inspecting air activities incident to the selection of bases for projected operations. For these, he received a Distinguished Flying Cross.

Under Fitch's command, AirSoPac—ultimately encompassing not only Navy but Army, Marine Corps, and Royal New Zealand air units—achieved great success in aiding the Allied campaign in the South Pacific. Fitch's planes protected Allied shipping, providing vital air cover that strongly assisted the Allies in challenging, and ultimately defeating, the Japanese in the Solomons. In addition, his aircraft performed essential reconnaissance missions, spotting enemy warships prior to the Battle of Santa Cruz Islands in October 1942 and during the Naval Battle of Guadalcanal in November 1942.

Later, Fitch oversaw the early experiments in conducting night bombing utilizing radar (a concept which paid great dividends in interdicting Japanese shipping) and encouraged the use of specially modified aircraft to obtain photographic intelligence. In addition, for his skillful coordination of the Allied air effort in that area of the world Fitch received a gold star in lieu of a second Distinguished Service Medal.

Fitch returned to Washington in the summer of 1944 and became the Deputy Chief of Naval Operations (Air). He skillfully and efficiently directed the aeronautical organization of the Navy, oversaw efforts to assure the readiness and deployment of air units, and planned all of the related logistics measures. For these efforts he received the Legion of Merit.

== Post-war service ==
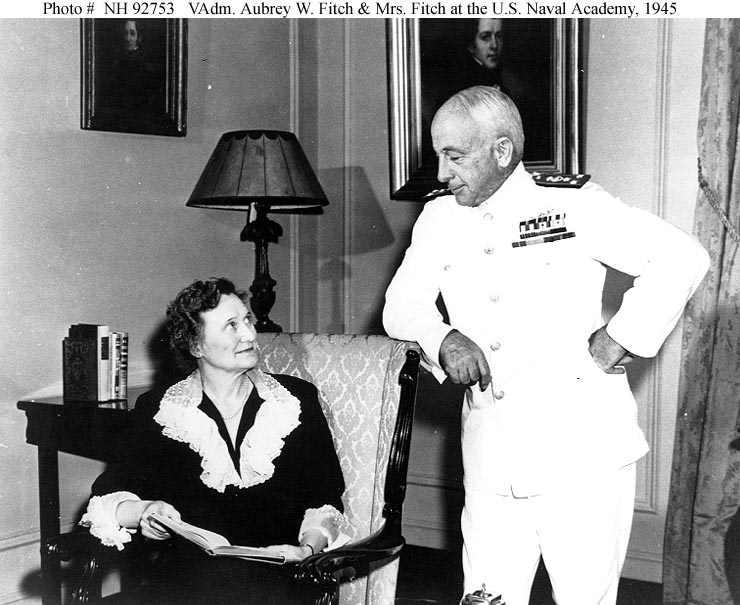
Vice Admiral Aubrey W. Fitch, USN, Superintendent of the U.S. Naval Academy; With Mrs. Gwyneth Fitch, in the Superintendent's House, Annapolis, Maryland, October 1945.

After V-J Day, Vice Admiral Fitch assumed duty as the superintendent of the Naval Academy on August 16, 1945, and held that post until January 15, 1947, with collateral duty as commandant, Severn River Command. The first aviator to head the Naval Academy, Fitch was instrumental in establishing the Department of Aeronautics, authorized by the Navy on November 28, 1945.

Subsequent to heading the academy, Fitch served briefly in the Office of the Undersecretary of the Navy before becoming the senior member of the Naval Clemency and Prison Inspection Board in March 1947. He was so serving when he retired from the Navy and was relieved of all active duty on July 1, 1947.

Admiral Fitch died due to a heart ailment combined with a bout with pneumonia in Newcastle, Maine, his adopted state, on May 22, 1978, shortly before his 95th birthday.

== Namesake ==
In 1981, the U.S. Navy guided-missile frigate USS Aubrey Fitch (FFG-34) was named in Admiral Fitch's honor.

The main road to the former NAS Brunswick, is named Admiral Fitch Avenue in his honor.

== TV and movie portrayals ==
Fitch was portrayed by Mitchell Ryan in the television version of the 1976 film Midway.

== Gallery ==
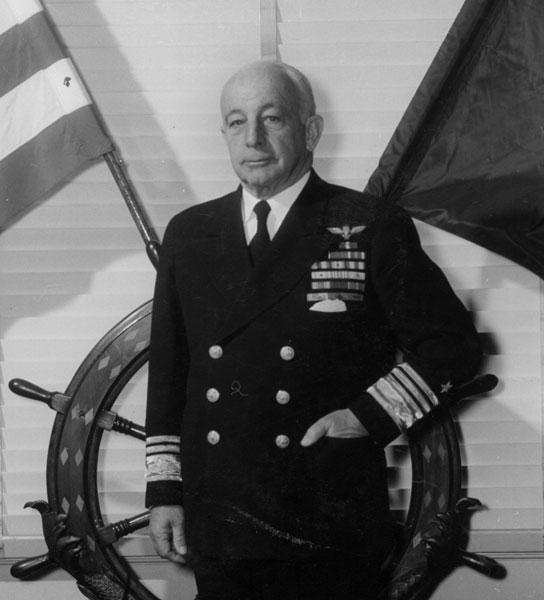

== See also ==
- List of superintendents of the United States Naval Academy

Academic offices
Preceded by John R. Beardall	Superintendent of United States Naval Academy; 1945-1947	Succeeded by James L. Holloway Jr.
