= Teal (disambiguation) =

Teal is a blue-green color .

Teal or TEAL may also refer to:

== Ducks ==
- some members of the subfamily Anatinae (dabbling ducks):
  - some members of the genus Anas:
    - Cape teal (Anas capensis)
    - Red-billed teal or red-billed duck (Anas erythrorhyncha)
    - Eurasian teal or common teal (Anas crecca), the original teal from which the color and other duck species are named
    - Green-winged teal (Anas carolinensis or Anas crecca carolinensis)
    - Yellow-billed teal or speckled teal (Anas flavirostris)
    - Andean teal or speckled teal (Anas andium)
    - Sunda teal or Indonesian teal (Anas gibberifrons)
    - Andaman teal (Anas albogularis)
    - Mascarene teal (Anas theodori)
    - Grey teal (Anas gracilis)
    - Chestnut teal (Anas castanea)
    - Bernier's teal or Madagascar teal (Anas bernieri)
    - Brown teal or New Zealand teal (Anas chlorotis)
    - Auckland teal or Auckland Islands teal (Anas aucklandica)
    - Campbell teal or Campbell Island teal (Anas nesiotis)
    - Laysan duck or Laysan teal (Anas laysanensis)
  - some members of the genus Spatula:
    - Blue-billed teal (Spatula hottentota)
    - Puna teal (Spatula puna)
    - Silver teal (Spatula versicolor)
    - Cinnamon teal (Spatula cyanoptera)
    - Blue-winged teal (Spatula discors)
  - Falcated duck or falcated teal (Mareca falcata)
  - Baikal teal (Sibirionetta formosa)
  - Brazilian teal or Brazilian duck (Amazonetta brasiliensis)
  - Ringed teal (Callonetta leucophrys)
  - Salvadori's teal or Salvadori's duck (Salvadorina waigiuensis)

== Aircraft ==
- Curtiss Teal, a 1930s monoplane amphibian
- Falconar Teal, a two-seat homebuilt, amphibious airplane designed by Chris Falconar from 1967
- Lesher Teal, an experimental aircraft from 1965
- Temco XKDT Teal, an American rocket-propelled, high-performance target drone
- Thurston Teal, a family of two- and four-seat all-aluminium amphibious flying boats designed by David Thurston from 1968

== Places ==
- Teal, Missouri, United States
- Teal Creek, Victoria, Australia
- Teal Inlet (Caleta Trullo), East Falkland, Falkland Islands, a settlement
- Teal Lake (Michigan), United States
- Teal Lake (Minnesota), United States
- Teal Park, a public greenspace in Horseheads, New York, United States
- Teal Ponds, Moraine Fjord, South Georgia Island
- Teal River, Nelson Region, South Island, New Zealand

== Politics ==
- Teal Deal, a proposed political alliance between Greens and Nationals in New Zealand in the mid-2000s
- Teal independents, centrist independent candidates against climate change in Australian politics

== Ships ==
- HMAS Teal, a Royal Australian Navy minesweeper in commission from 1962 to 1970
- USFS Teal, a United States Bureau of Fisheries fishery patrol vessel in commission from 1927 to 1940 which then served in the fleet of the United States Fish and Wildlife Service as US FWS Teal from 1940 to 1960
- USS Teal (AM-23), a United States Navy minesweeper in commission from 1918 to 1945 which was modified to serve as the seaplane tender USS Teal (AVP-5) from 1936 to 1945

== Sports ==
- Teal, the winning horse in the 1952 Grand National
- Teal Cup, the original name of the AFL Under 18 Championships for Australian rules football

== Other uses ==
- Tasman Empire Airways Limited (TEAL), an airline from 1939 to 1965, the forerunner of Air New Zealand
- Teal (name), a list of people and fictional characters with either the surname or given name
- Teal organisation, an emerging organizational paradigm based on an evolutionary development of human consciousness
- Technology-enhanced active learning, a teaching method
- Triethylaluminium, an organoaluminium compound
- Technology Education and Literacy in Schools

== See also ==
- Tael (disambiguation)
- Thiel (disambiguation)
- Bonomi BS.22 Alzavola (Italian, 'teal'), a 1930s Italian training motor glider
- Weezer, or the Teal Album, by Weezer, 2019
