= Thiele (disambiguation) =

Thiele is a German surname.

Thiele may also refer to:

- Thiele, chain of retail opticians headquartered in Copenhagen, Denmark.
- Thiele (Aar), a river of Hesse, Germany, tributary of the Aar
- Thiele's interpolation formula defines a rational function, expressed as a continued fraction, that interpolates a given set of values
- Thiele modulus, in Chemistry
- Thiele tube, laboratory glassware
- German destroyer Z2 Georg Thiele, built for the German Navy during the mid-1930s
- 1586 Thiele, a minor planet

== See also ==
- Thiele or Thièle: a river in Switzerland: see Thielle and its upstream name Orbe
- Thiel (disambiguation)
- Tiele (disambiguation)
- Teale
