= USS Wright (AV-1) =

Tender of the United States Navy

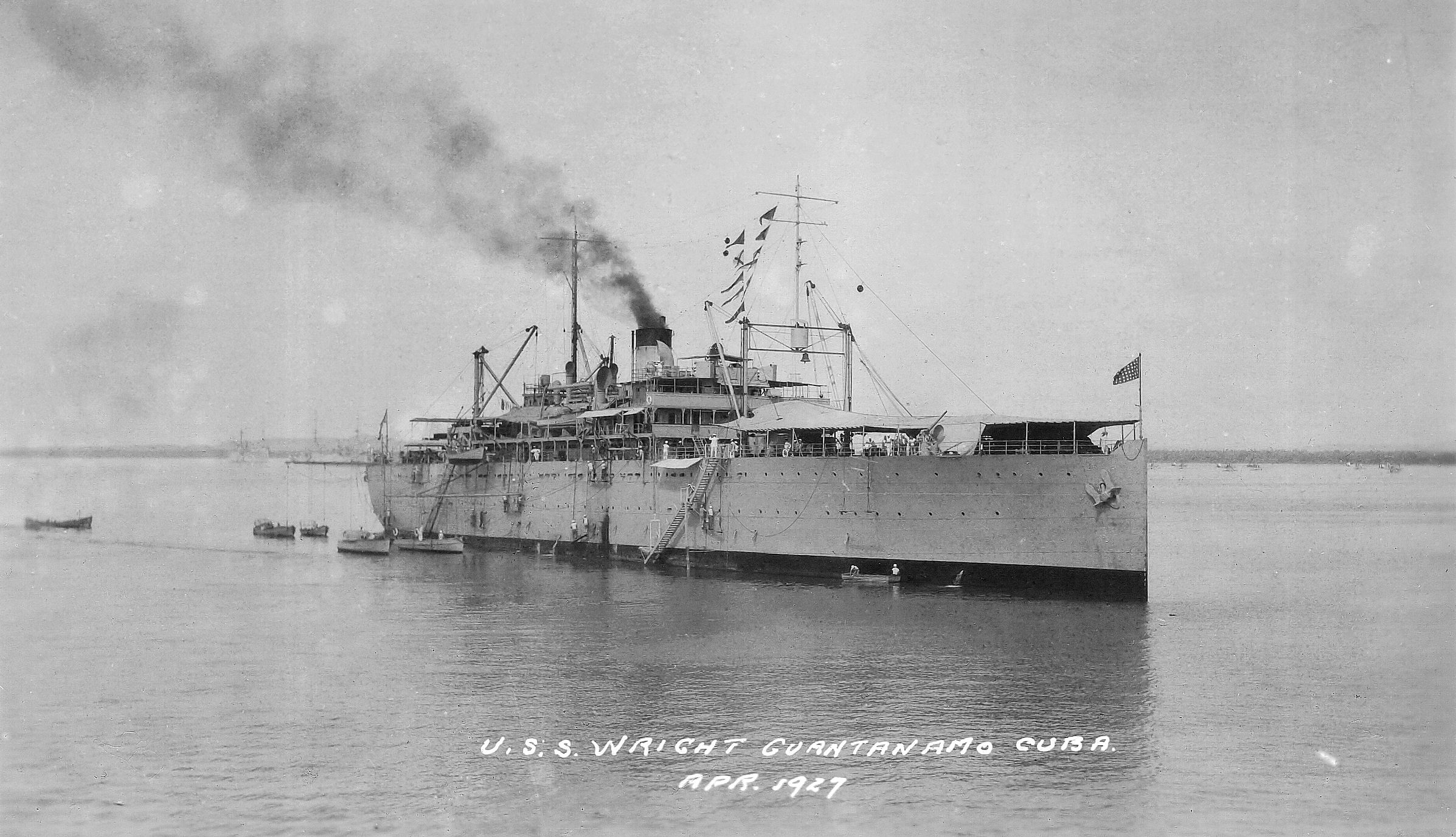
- USS Wright (AZ-1) at Guantánamo Bay, Cuba, April 1927

History

United States
- Name: Wright
- Namesake: Orville Wright
- Builder: American International Shipbuilding Corporation, Hog Island, Pennsylvania
- Yard number: 680
- Laid down: 5 February 1919 as Skaneateles
- Launched: 28 April 1920
- Completed: 16 December 1921
- Commissioned: 16 December 1921, as AZ-1
- Decommissioned: 21 June 1946
- Renamed: San Clemente (AG-79), 1 February 1945
- Reclassified: AV-1 (Aircraft Tender), 2 December 1926; AG-79 (Miscellaneous Auxiliary), 1 October 1944
- Stricken: 1 July 1946
- Honours and awards: 2 battle stars (World War II)
- Fate: Transferred to Maritime Commission, 21 September 1946; Sold for scrapping, 19 August 1948

General characteristics
- Type: Seaplane tender
- Displacement: 11,500 long tons (11,685 t) full load
- Length: 448 ft (137 m)
- Beam: 58 ft (18 m)
- Draft: 23 ft (7.0 m)
- Propulsion: 1 × General Electric turbine, 3,000 shp (2,237 kW); 1 shaft
- Speed: 15.3 knots (28.3 km/h; 17.6 mph)
- Complement: 228 officers and men
- Armament: 2 × 5"/38 caliber guns; 2 × 3"/50 caliber guns; 2 × machine guns
- Aircraft carried: F5L and Curtiss NC-10 seaplanes

USS Wright (AZ-1/AV-1) was a one-of-a-kind auxiliary ship in the United States Navy, named for aviation pioneer Orville Wright. Originally built as a kite balloon tender, she was converted into a seaplane tender after kite balloons were no longer used.

== Construction and commissioning ==
Originally the unnamed "hull no. 680", the ship was laid down at Hog Island, Pennsylvania by the American International Shipbuilding Corporation under a United States Shipping Board contract as a standard EFC 1024 (Hog Island "B" type troopship). Originally named USAT Somme, she was named "Wright" on 20 April 1920 and launched on 28 April. A little over two months later, the Navy signed a contract with the Tietjen and Lang Dry Dock Company of Hoboken, New Jersey to convert the ship to a unique type of auxiliary vessel, a "combined lighter-than-air/heavier-than-air aviation tender." On 17 July 1920, the ship received that classification and was designated AZ-1. Wright was commissioned at the New York Navy Yard on 16 December 1921. Her first commanding officer was Captain (later Admiral) Alfred W. Johnson, who also discharged the collateral duties of Commander, Air Squadrons, Atlantic Fleet. Johnson was the first of a long line of commanding officers for the ship, some of whom later distinguished themselves; men such as John Rodgers, Ernest J. King, Aubrey W. Fitch, Patrick N. L. Bellinger, and Marc A. Mitscher.

== Service history ==
=== 1922 ===
From the New York Navy Yard, Wright sailed for the Philadelphia Navy Yard and reached there on 22 February 1922. After installation of her armament, the lighter-than-air aircraft tender departed Philadelphia on 2 March, touching at Hampton Roads, Virginia and Charleston, South Carolina en route to the Florida coast. Arriving at Key West on 11 March, Wright reported for special duty with the first division of Scouting Squadron 1 – a unit that included the seaplane NC-10 piloted by Lieutenant Clifton A. F. Sprague and a half-dozen Felixstowe F5L seaplanes. Three days later, the tender put to sea for operations with Scouting Division 1 out of Guantanamo Bay, Cuba. There, she was later joined by the six planes of Division 2 and two planes of Division 3.

Wright, fitted out with a unique "balloon well" built into the ship's hull, aft, to enable her to tend a kite balloon assigned to the ship for experimental operations, departed Guantanamo Bay on 10 April and (while en route back to Key West) conducted maneuvers to experiment with the kite observation balloon. A few weeks after Wright reached her destination, the NC-10 flying boat had her bottom sucked out while she attempted to take off and began to sink in seven feet (2.1 m) of water. A rescue and repair party salvaged the hull and other parts of the seaplane and brought them on board the tender. Two days later, Wright sailed for the Philadelphia Navy Yard and, after brief stops at Norfolk, Virginia and Charleston en route, arrived there on 8 May. Following repairs and alterations at Philadelphia between 8 May and 21 June, Wright headed south and conducted tending operations from Norfolk to Pensacola, Florida, and back. While in Hampton Roads on 16 July, Wright sent up her kite balloon for the last time before transferring it ashore to be based at the Hampton Roads Naval Air Station (NAS).

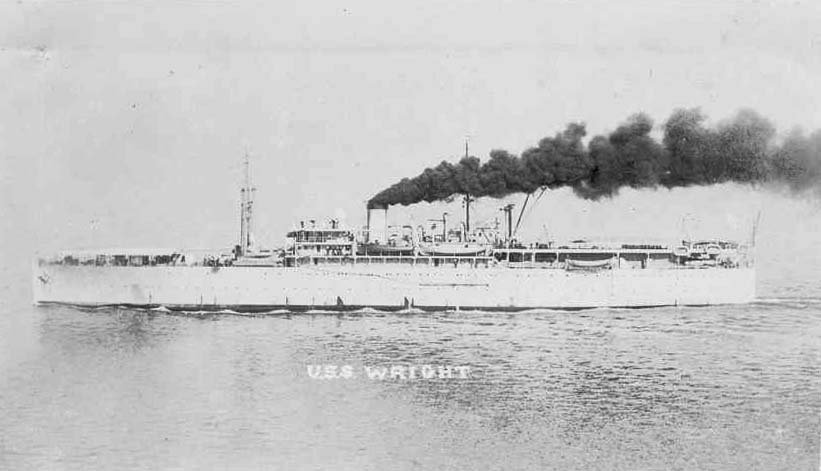
USS Wright port broadside view, date and place unknown

Later that summer, Wright visited New York City and then shifted to Newport, Rhode Island, arriving there on 7 August. The ship tended seaplanes in that vicinity, as they engaged in formation bombing exercises on stationary and towed targets. Wright subsequently operated off Solomons Island, Maryland where the seaplanes conducted battle practice and bombing rehearsals. From 15 to 24 September, she tended the 13 F5L seaplanes from Scouting Squadron 1 as they conducted bombing practice on towed targets in the Chesapeake Bay region. Later that autumn, Wright visited Baltimore, Maryland. Following her visit to that port, Wright cruised down the eastern seaboard for training operations out of Key West.

=== 1923–1924 ===
On 28 January 1923, Wright departed Florida waters in company with the converted minesweepers USS Sandpiper and USS Teal and supported the 18 patrol planes of Scouting Squadron 1 in combined fleet tactics in waters ranging from Cuba and Honduras to the Panama Canal.

Between 18 and 22 February, Wright's planes participated in Fleet Problem I – a phase of which tested the defenses of the Panama Canal. Assigned to the "Blue" fleet, Wright and the two sister "Bird-boats" (Sandpiper and Teal) tended the planes from Scouting Squadron 1 that assisted that force as well as Army coastal and air units in defending the Panama Canal against air attack. The attacking "Black" fleet used two battleships as substitutes for "aircraft carriers" which it did not possess. On 21 February, one of those simulated flattops, Oklahoma, launched a single plane to scout ahead of the "Black" fleet, and, the following morning, sent a single plane aloft. That aircraft – which took off from Naranyas Cay – represented a carrier air group, and made her approach to the canal undetected. It dropped ten miniature bombs and theoretically "destroyed" the Gatun spillway.

After returning to Key West on 11 April, Wright spent the next two years off the Eastern Seaboard of the United States, operating out of Hampton Roads and Newport in waters that ranged from the Virginia Capes to the Virgin Islands.

=== 1925–1932 ===
Wright ultimately departed Hampton Roads on 21 January 1925 as flagship for Captain Harry E. Yarnell, Commander, Air Squadrons, Scouting Fleet, bound for the Pacific Ocean. After transiting the Panama Canal, the tender reached Pearl Harbor on 25 February and operated in the Hawaiian area until 8 June when she proceeded back to the East Coast of the United States, reaching Norfolk on 18 July. Soon after Wright' return to the Eastern Seaboard, work began to convert the ship to a "heavier-than-air aircraft tender" and, by 1 December, the work was complete.

Reclassified AV-1, the tender continued to support the seaplanes of the Scouting Fleet, operating out of Hampton Roads and Newport, to ports of Florida, Cuba, and Panama. As flagship for Commander, Aircraft Squadrons, Scouting Force reclassified to Commander, Aircraft, Scouting Force in 1932, Wright usually spent four months of each winter in operations out of Guantanamo Bay in waters reaching from Panama to the Virgin Islands. For the remainder of the year, she worked in the Narragansett Bay and Chesapeake Bay areas, operating, as before, out of Hampton Roads and Newport with periodic cruises to the warmer climes of Florida or port visits to New York City. Wright's tending duties along the Eastern Seaboard and into the Caribbean continued until 3 February 1932. Varying her duties as tender were several assignments for special service.

==== Special services, 1927–1929 ====
When the United States Coast Guard destroyer Paulding rammed and sank the submarine S-4 on the afternoon of 17 December 1927 off Provincetown, Massachusetts, Wright immediately loaded six salvage pontoons at the Norfolk Navy Yard and set out for the scene of the disaster. Although delayed by strong Atlantic gales, Wright reached Provincetown, via Boston, on the afternoon of 21 December. Meanwhile, on the day that Wright departed Norfolk, her commanding officer, specially detached, Captain Ernest J. King, took the train from Norfolk to New York and proceeded thence by plane to Provincetown. Arriving on board Falcon at 1315 on 18 December, Capt. King became senior aide to Rear Admiral Frank H. Brumby and took direct charge of the salvage operations. S-4 was finally brought to the surface on 17 March 1928 and subsequently taken to the Boston Navy Yard.

Meanwhile, Wright had been detached from the operation two days after Christmas 1927 and returned to Norfolk. The following year, the ship's routine was broken by transporting building materials to the hurricane-devastated island of St. Croix; and, in 1929, she carried Marines to Cuba when trouble threatened in Haiti.

=== 1932–1935 ===
Wright stood out of Hampton Roads on 5 January 1932 and supported air patrol squadron tactical evolutions ranging from Cuba and Jamaica to Coco Solo, Canal Zone. Arriving at the latter port on 1 February, the tender transited the isthmian waterway two days later, accompanying and tending the planes from Patrol Squadrons (VP) 2 and 5. After tactical evolutions off Acapulco and at Magdalena Bay, Mexico, Wright made port at NAS North Island, San Diego, on 20 February.

From the time of her arrival at NAS North Island, on 20 February 1932 until 10 September 1939, Wright made 14 extended cruises in support of naval seaplane squadrons. The first of those began when she departed San Diego on 1 May 1933 for an aviation transport run that included an inspection by Rear Admiral John Halligan, Jr., Commander, Aircraft Squadrons, Battle Force, of the Fleet Air Base (FAB) at Pearl Harbor. After returning to San Diego on 4 June, Wright operated along the West Coast, followed by a cruise to Panama and the Caribbean, between 31 August and 14 October, tending the planes from VP-2F, VP-5F, VP-10, and Utility Patrol Squadron 3. Wright sailed again for Hawaiian waters on 5 January 1934; and – in operations that took her from Hilo Bay, Hawaii, to Midway Island and French Frigate Shoals – tended 32 seaplanes. She then returned to San Diego on 30 May and departed again on 18 July for her first voyage to Alaskan waters. Steaming by way of Seattle, Washington, the tender visited Ketchikan and Juneau in early August before she tended two squadrons of seaplanes in waters near Seward and Sitka, Alaska. Proceeding via Vancouver, British Columbia, and San Francisco, Wright arrived back in San Diego on 6 September 1933 and remained in nearby waters for the rest of the year.

=== 1935–1938 ===
On 4 January 1935, Wright departed San Diego for tender operations off Panama; Cartagena, Colombia; Curaçao, Netherlands West Indies; Trinidad, British West Indies; and the Dominican Republic and Haiti. Upon completion of those exercises, she returned to San Diego on 1 March but soon sailed again for northern climes to operate between Dutch Harbor and Sitka from 29 April to 28 May before resuming her local tending operations along the coast of California. Wright departed San Diego on 10 October and took up a plane guard station off Las Tres Marias, Mexico, soon thereafter, covering one leg of the flight of the Consolidated XP3Y which took off from Cristobal Harbor, Canal Zone, on 14 October for a non-stop flight to Alameda, California. Commanded by Lt. Comdr. Knefler "Sock" McGinnis who was assisted by Lt. (jg.) J. K. Averill, Naval Aviation Pilot T. P. Wilkinson, and a crew of three – the plane passed abeam of Wright at 2210 on 14 October. That XP3Y reached Alameda in 24 hours and 45 minutes – thus establishing a new world's record for Class C seaplanes of 3,281.383 miles airline distance and 3,443.225 miles broken-line distance.

Returning to San Diego from her planeguard station on 17 October, Wright spent only a short period in port and sailed again four days later, for Palmyra Island. Reaching that point on the last day of October, Wright supported the planes photographing the island and served as "home" for the survey party sent ashore. Setting course for Pearl Harbor on 2 November, she later embarked men of VP-6F for transport to French Frigate Shoals. She then tended three squadrons of seaplanes off East Island while her diving party engaged in reef-blasting operations for the seaplane base being established there. Terminating that support duty on 12 November, Wright headed for the West Coast, reaching San Diego on 28 November. For the remainder of 1935, Wright operated locally. Her coastwise duties were interrupted between 16 January and 28 February 1936 by an aviation support cruise to Post Office Bay, Galápagos Islands; Santa Elena, Ecuador; and Balboa, Canal Zone. Wright then participated in fleet problems off Lower California and cruised to Sitka Sound, Alaska, where she tended a utility plane wing (two squadrons) and a patrol wing of five squadrons, between 22 August and 28 September.

After repairs at the Mare Island Navy Yard, Vallejo, California, Wright departed San Diego on 10 October 1936 for Pearl Harbor and thence sailed once more to French Frigate Shoals, reaching there on 25 October. She then landed a camp detachment to establish a base on East Island, and tended seaplanes from VP-1, VP-3, VP-4, and VP-10 until 6 November. After returning to the West Coast, Wright subsequently made a winter training cruise to the Caribbean between 2 February and 26 March 1937 and then, after her return to San Diego, departed the United States West Coast on 18 April 1937 in company with the aircraft carrier USS Langley for fleet problems that stretched to the Hawaiian Islands. Following her return to San Diego on 3 June 1937, Wright spent the next year in coastal operations that took her as far south as Lower California. On 20 October 1937, Commander, Aircraft, Scouting Force, was detached from the ship, and Wright became flagship for Commander, Patrol Wing 1, Aircraft, Scouting Fleet.

Wright made a cruise to Kodiak, Territory of Alaska, and Sitka Sound in Southeast Alaska between 20 June and 5 August 1938. During the cruise, the United States Bureau of Fisheries fishery patrol vessel USFS Brant ran aground on Williams Reef in the Kodiak Archipelago 8 nautical miles (15 km; 9.2 mi) from Kodiak on 15 July 1938 and suffered extensive damage. Wright and the seaplane tender USS Teal arrived to render assistance and succeeded in refloating Brant, which later underwent repairs at Seattle and returned to service by January 1939.

=== 1939–1941 ===
The tender departed San Diego on 2 January 1939 to participate in winter maneuvers in the Caribbean with her aviation units and took part in Fleet Problem XX. Reaching Norfolk from Puerto Rico on 14 March, the seaplane tender returned to the West Coast soon thereafter, as part of the general movement of the fleet from Atlantic to Pacific. Back at San Diego on 16 May, Wright operated out of that port until 10 September, when she sailed for the Hawaiian Islands to become flagship for PatWing 2, based at Pearl Harbor. Arriving there on 19 September (less than three weeks after the outbreak of war in Europe) Wright spent the next two years supporting the establishment of aviation bases on Midway, Canton, Johnston, Palmyra, and Wake Islands. She transported Marines and aviation personnel, as well as construction workers and contractors, between those valuable bases, time and again landing cargo that ranged from construction materials to gasoline and ordnance supplies and other advance base gear. In September 1941 Wright was selected as the flagship of PatWing 1, Aircraft, Scouting Force.

=== World War II, 1941 ===
Wright departed Pearl Harbor on 20 November, bound for Wake Island, arrived at that advanced base on the 28th, and landed Comdr. "Spiv" Winfield S. Cunningham, who took command of the naval activities on the vulnerable isle, Major James "Jimmy" Patrick Sinnot Deveraux, USMC and Lt. Col Walter L. J. Bayler, USMC. Other passengers who went ashore from the seaplane tender included asphalt technicians, other construction workers, and other Marine Corps officers. The ship also delivered 63,000 gallons of gasoline to Wake's storage tanks before setting course for Midway. There, she delivered a cargo that included ammunition and disembarked passengers that included men reporting for duty at the NAS and with other Marine Corps ground units. Then, with military and civilian passengers embarked, Wright departed Midway on 4 December and headed for Pearl Harbor.

During the night of 6/7 December 1941, while sailing toward Pearl Harbor at night, the crew spotted an aircraft carrier that overtook it as it sailed toward Hawaii. Whether Wright radioed a report of the sighting or not is unclear, but even if they had, the report was not recognized for what it was—an actual sighting of one of the Japanese aircraft carriers just hours prior to the attack, and the only such sighting made by an American Naval asset. The sighting was recalled by a former member of the crew serving on Wright named Sherwin Callander. As an elderly gentleman in 2019, while being interviewed for a video, unexpectedly he recalled, "A carrier passed us, going in the same direction. We were headin' back to Pearl and they were headin' towards Pearl too. And we knew it was a carrier -- it was at night -- but we didn't know what nationality it was. Then the next morning, we heard over the news broadcast that they attacked Pearl Harbor. When we pulled into Pearl Harbor, I'd never seen such a mess in my life. I even had to pull bodies out of the water."

The following morning, while en route to Pearl Harbor, the received the electrifying news that the Japanese had attacked Pearl Harbor that morning 7 December 1941. Word of the attack arrived shortly after 0800 that day, and Wright cleared for action and manned her battle stations. Fortunately for her, she did not cross the path of the returning Japanese striking force. After reaching Pearl Harbor the day after the Japanese attack, Wright got underway on 19 December to transport 126 Marines of the 4th Defense Battalion, with their gear, to Midway. She returned to Pearl Harbor on the day after Christmas with 205 civilians embarked.

=== 1942 ===
Wright then underwent voyage repairs, loaded stores and cargo, embarked passengers, and set sail for the South Seas. Departing Pearl Harbor on 2 April, Wright touched at Tutuila, Samoa; the Fiji Islands; Espiritu Santo, in the New Hebrides – where she debarked men of VP-72 – and Nouméa, New Caledonia, before she reached Sydney, Australia, on 26 April. After visiting Melbourne and Fremantle, Wright headed for the Hawaiian Islands, retracing her course, and reached Pearl Harbor on 16 June. For the next five and one-half months, Wright shuttled military passengers, arms, gasoline, and other equipment to Midway and other defense bases of the Hawaiian Sea Frontier. Leaving Oahu on 1 December, Wright headed for the South Pacific carrying, as passengers, the officers and men of Marine Scout Bomber Squadron 233 (VMSB 233) and VMSB-234, along with other passengers and logistic support cargo.

=== 1943 ===
The seaplane tender debarked the personnel from VMSB-233 at Espiritu Santo and those from VMSB-234 at Nouméa before she returned to Pearl Harbor on 17 January 1943. She sailed thence to Midway, transporting a group of passengers that included 205 Marines, and from there shifted to the Fiji Islands where she disembarked the 7 officers and 254 enlisted men of FAB Unit 13 who were put ashore with their gear and logistic cargo.

Departing the Fijis on 9 March, Wright sailed by way of Pearl Harbor, reaching Oakland, California, for an overhaul at the Moore Dry Dock Co. Following repairs and alterations, the tender put to sea on 20 July, bound for the Hawaiian Islands, and debarked the men of Marine Fighting Squadron 223 (VMF-223) at Pearl Harbor a week later. Wright sailed again for Espiritu Santo at the end of July, arriving there on 12 August; and landed the 31 officers and 238 men of VMF-222. She next proceeded to Rendova harbor, Rendova Island, and tended the planes of VP-14 until 17 January 1944.

=== 1944 ===
She then shifted to Hawthorn Sound, New Georgia, to tend that squadron along with those from VP-71 until 18 April. Upon arriving at Gavutu harbor, Florida Island, in the Solomons, on 20 April, Wright loaded aviation stores before she proceeded to Espiritu Santo for repairs that lasted through the end of May. Underway on 1 June, Wright transported eight Navy officers and 256 Army passengers to Tulagi harbor before she steamed to Blanche harbor on 5 June. A week later, eight planes (along with 26 officers and 52 men) from VP-101 arrived and operated from Wright until 17 June. Heading for Seeadler Harbor on that day, Wright embarked passengers and loaded bombs and 170 bundles of cots for transportation to New Guinea. Reaching Humboldt Bay on 23 June, the ship tended the planes and housed the 30 officers and 54 men of VP-33 until 16 July, when she put to sea for Mios Woendi, in the Padiado Islands, Dutch New Guinea, arriving on the 17th. She then based five planes from VP-52 – and supported the 36 officers and 66 enlisted men attached to the squadron – and three patrol planes from Royal Australian Air Force No. 20 Squadron from 19 to 26 July.

Rear Admiral Frank D. Wagner, Commander, Aircraft, 7th Fleet, broke his flag in Wright on 27 July and used the tender as his temporary flagship. That same day, VP-11 arrived at Mios Woendi and operated from Wright. VP-52 left for duty elsewhere on 3 August, the same day that the tender stood out of the Mios Woendi anchorage that had been her "home" for over a month, bound via Edema Island, British New Guinea, for the Admiralties. Returning to Mios Woendi on 27 August after safely delivering her cargo and passengers of Fleet Air Wing 17, Wright embarked the officers and men of Patrol Aircraft Service Unit 1–12 for transportation back to Seeadler Harbor, Manus, where she arrived on 3 September. Departing Manus the following day, Wright sailed for Milne Bay, New Guinea, where she debarked men from a construction battalion, and then proceeded with Pacific Service Force passengers, general cargo, and hospital patients to Brisbane, Australia. There, on 26 October, Wright embarked Rear Admiral Robert O. Glover, Commander, Service Force, 7th Fleet – along with his staff of 64 officers and 204 men – and became the flagship for Service Squadron 7, Service Force, Pacific Fleet. Reclassified as headquarters ship effective 1 October 1944, Wright's designation was changed from AV-1 to AG-79.

=== 1945 ===
Proceeding from Brisbane via New Guinea, Wright reached Seeadler Harbor on 5 January 1945, for repairs that lasted until 14 January. She then proceeded via Humboldt Bay to San Pedro Bay, Leyte, reaching Philippine waters on 3 February 1945. During her passage, the ship was renamed USS San Clemente (AG-79) on 1 February 1945, to clear the name Wright for the light fleet carrier, Wright (CVL-49), then under construction. San Clemente remained as flagship for Service Squadron 7 and the nerve center of the Pacific Fleet Service Force, based on San Pedro, Subic, and Manila Bays, through the end of hostilities with Japan in mid-August 1945 and the formal Japanese surrender on 2 September.

=== 1946 ===
She departed Manila on 3 January 1946, bound for the China coast; reached Shanghai soon thereafter; and became flagship for Service Division 101 – Commodore E. E. Duval, commanding – on 5 February. San Clemente remained at Shanghai in support of the Navy occupation forces there until 7 April, when she was relieved by Holland as flagship of ServRon 101. With hundreds of troops embarked as passengers, San Clemente departed Chinese waters on 8 April, bound – via Yokosuka, Japan, and Pearl Harbor – for home.

== Decommissioning and sale ==
Reaching San Francisco on 2 May, San Clemente got underway again eight days later and headed for the East Coast of the United States. Reaching the New York Naval Shipyard (the old New York Navy Yard) on 29 May, she commenced inactivation proceedings and was decommissioned on 21 June 1946. Struck from the Naval Vessel Register on 1 July 1946 the illustrious tender was transferred to the Maritime Commission for disposal on 21 September 1946. She was sold for scrap on 19 August 1948.

== Awards ==
- American Defense Service Medal with "FLEET" clasp
- Asiatic-Pacific Campaign Medal with two battle stars
- World War II Victory Medal
- Navy Occupation Medal with "ASIA" clasp
- China Service Medal
