= Teale =

Teale is a surname and a given name, and may refer to:

== Surname ==
- Edwin Way Teale (1899–1980), American naturalist, photographer and Pulitzer Prize-winning writer
- Fred H. Teale, Los Angeles City Auditor from 1892 until 1896
- Gary Teale (born 1978), Scottish footballer and manager
- Leanne Teale (Karla Homolka, born 1970), Canadian woman convicted of manslaughter in 1993
- Leonard Teale (1922-1994), Australian actor
- Matt Teale (born 1975), British broadcast journalist and newsreader
- Nellie Teale (1900–1993), American naturalist
- Owen Teale (born 1961), Welsh actor
- Paul Teale, alias of the Canadian serial killer Paul Bernardo
- Shaun Teale (born 1964), English retired footballer and manager
- Thomas Pridgin Teale (died 1867) (1800-1867), British surgeon
- Thomas Pridgin Teale (died 1923) (1831-1923), British surgeon, son of the above

== Given name ==
- Teale Phelps Bondaroff, Canadian politician
- Teale Coco (born 1992), Australian model and fashion designer
- Teale Jakubenko, a top 12 finalist in Australian Idol (season 6)
- Teale Orban (born 1986), Canadian football quarterback

== Company ==
- teale, French company

== See also ==
- Teal (disambiguation)
- Thiele (disambiguation)
