= USS Teal =

Minesweeper of the United States Navy

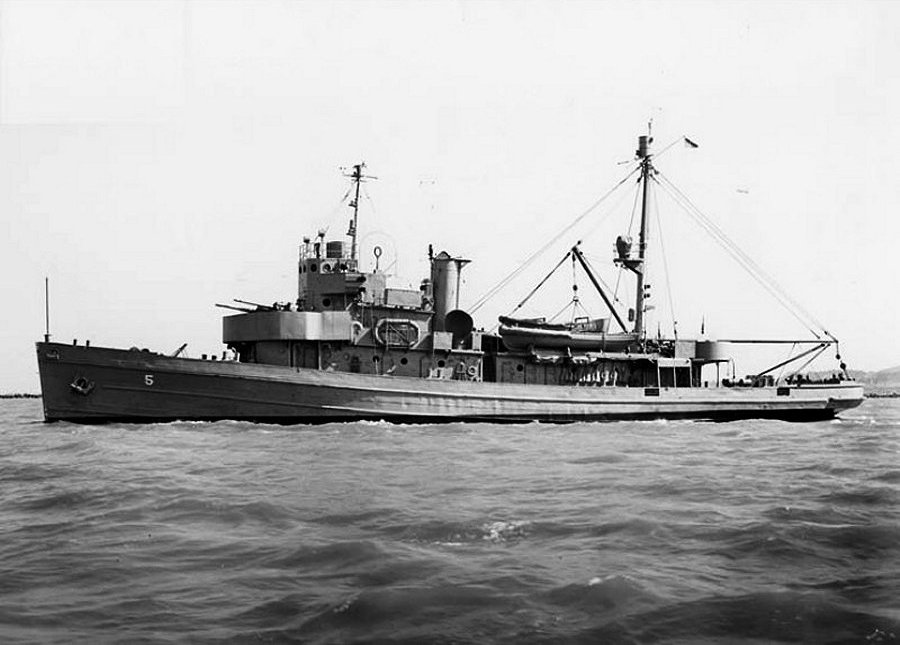
- USS Teal

History

United States
- Name: USS Teal
- Builder: Sun Shipbuilding and Drydock Company, Chester, Pennsylvania
- Laid down: 8 October 1917
- Launched: 25 May 1918
- Commissioned: 20 August 1918, as Minesweeper No.23
- Decommissioned: 23 November 1945
- Reclassified: AM-23, 17 July 1920; AVP-5, 22 January 1936
- Stricken: 5 December 1945
- Fate: Sold, 19 January 1948

General characteristics
- Class & type: Lapwing-class minesweeper
- Displacement: 840 long tons (853 t)
- Length: 187 ft 10 in (57.25 m)
- Beam: 35 ft 6 in (10.82 m)
- Draft: 10 ft 3 in (3.12 m)
- Speed: 14 knots (26 km/h; 16 mph)
- Complement: 85
- Armament: 2 × 3 in (76 mm) guns

USS Teal (AM-23/AVP-5) was a Lapwing-class minesweeper acquired by the United States Navy for the task of removing naval mines from minefields laid in the water to prevent ships from passing. The ship entered service in 1918, was converted into a seaplane tender in the 1920s and took part in World War II, serving primarily in Alaskan waters. Following the war, the ship was decommissioned and sold in 1948. Teal was named after the teal, any of several small, short-necked, river ducks common to Europe and the Americas.

== Service history ==
=== Early career ===
Teal (Minesweeper No. 23) was laid down on 8 October 1917 at Chester, Pennsylvania, by the Sun Shipbuilding Co.;. The ship was launched on 25 May 1918, sponsored by Miss Agnes M. Haig. Teal was commissioned on 20 August 1918 at the Philadelphia Navy Yard.

Through the end of World War I and into the spring of 1919, Teal served in the 4th Naval District patrolling off the shores of New Jersey, Delaware, and Pennsylvania. On 20 April 1919, the minesweeper reported for duty with the North Sea Minesweeping Detachment. As a unit of Mine Division 2, she labored to clear the North Sea Mine Barrage and remained in European waters until the task had been completed late in the fall of 1919.

=== Modified as an auxiliary aircraft tender ===
Upon her return to the United States toward the end of November, Teal was modified for service as an auxiliary aircraft tender. Although not officially designated a "minesweeper for duty with aircraft" until 30 April 1931, she nevertheless served in this capacity throughout the 1920s and into the 1930s. Operating out of Norfolk, Virginia, from the Caribbean in the south to Narragansett Bay in the north, Teal supported operations with the air squadrons of the Scouting Fleet. Frequently in company with USS Wright and USS Sandpiper, and later with USS Lapwing, she visited the Panama Canal Zone where she serviced the squadrons based at Coco Solo. Her normal schedule alternated winter maneuvers in the Caribbean-Gulf of Mexico area with summer training along the New England coast.

By the mid-1930s, Teal's home port was Coco Solo, whence she operated with Patrol Wing (PatWing) 4. Teal was re-designated a small seaplane tender, AVP-5, effective on 22 January 1936. On 18 October 1937, she and PatWing 4 were reassigned to Seattle, Washington. For almost five years, Teal operated throughout the Aleutian Islands in support of PatWing 4 operations.

On 15 July 1938, the United States Bureau of Fisheries fishery patrol vessel USFS Brant ran aground on Williams Reef in the Kodiak Archipelago 8 nautical miles (15 km; 9.2 mi) from Kodiak, Territory of Alaska, and suffered extensive damage. Teal and USS Wright arrived to render assistance and succeeded in refloating Brant. Teal then towed Brant southward and passed the tow to the United States Coast Guard cutter USCGC Alert, which towed her the rest of the way to Ketchikan, Territory of Alaska. Brant later was repaired at Seattle and returned to service by January 1939.

=== World War II operations ===
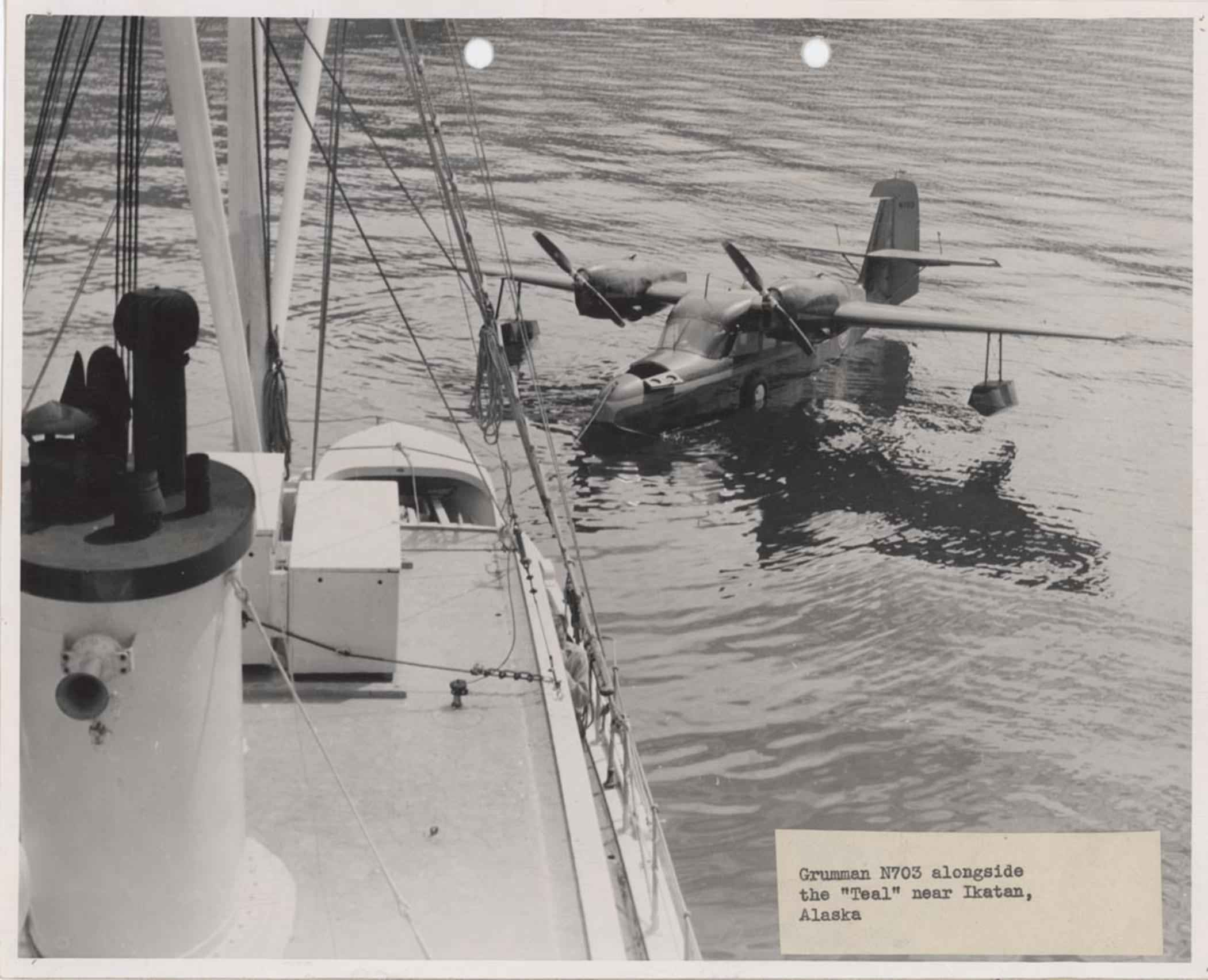
Grumman Widgeon aircraft alongside Teal

Soon after the opening of hostilities between the United States and Japan, Teal moved south to the California coast. In January 1942, the small seaplane tender was assigned to the Pacific Southern Naval Coastal Frontier, the short-lived forerunner of the Western Sea Frontier, but she remained administratively under the commander of the Scouting Force aircraft. She tended the planes of PatWing 8 until March. In July, Teal returned to Seattle and duty with Pat-Wing 4 in the Pacific Northwest and Alaska areas. Until the end of the war, the small seaplane tender plowed the icy seas between the Aleutian Islands and along the Alaskan coast. She continued to support flying patrol boats; but the drain of warships from the Alaskan theater to other, more active areas frequently required her to be pressed into service as an escort and sometimes as a resupply transport.

=== Decommissioning ===
Shortly after the cessation of hostilities on 23 November 1945, Teal was decommissioned at Seattle, Washington; and her name was struck from the Navy list on 5 December 1945. On 19 January 1948, she was delivered to the Maritime Commission at Port Nordland, Washington, and simultaneously sold to Mr. Murray E. Baker.
