= AP Computer Science Principles =

Advanced Placement course and exam

Logo of AP Placement Computer Science Principles

Advanced Placement (AP) Computer Science Principles (also known as AP CSP) is an AP Computer Science course and examination offered by the College Board under the Advanced Placement program. The course is designed as an equivalent to a first-semester course in computing. Assessment for AP Computer Science Principles is divided into two parts: a Create Performance Task due during the course, as well as an AP exam.

AP Computer Science Principles examines a variety of computing topics on a largely conceptual level, and teaches procedural programming. The course also includes a "Create Task", where students must develop a program, demonstrated in a video and a written reflection. The course may be taught in any programming language with procedures, mathematical expressions, variables, lists, conditionals, and loops. Coding portions of the AP exam are based in both text-based and block-based pseudocode, as defined by the provided reference sheet.

The AP Computer Science Principles Exam was administered for the first time on May 5, 2017.

== Course ==
The framework focuses on computational thinking practices which are applied throughout the curriculum. The concept outline included in the curriculum is divided into seven units called "Big Ideas". Each unit contains a series of "Learning Objectives". Each "Learning Objective" is a general benchmark of student performance or understanding which has an associated "Enduring Understanding". An "Enduring Understanding" is a core comprehension which students should retain well after completing the course. Each "Learning Objective" is split into multiple "Essential Knowledge" standards, which are specific facts or content which the student must know to demonstrate mastery of the learning objective when assessed.

Computational Thinking Practices: Skills	Concept Outline
P1: Computational Solution Design; P2: Algorithms and Program Development; P3: Abstraction in Program Development; P4: Code Analysis; P5: Computing Innovations; P6: Responsible Computing	Big Idea 1: Creative Development (collaboration, software development process); Big Idea 2: Data (binary, compression, spreadsheets, etc.); Big Idea 3: Algorithms and Programming (procedural programming, binary search); Big Idea 4: Computer Systems and Networks; Big Idea 5: Impact of Computing (digital divide, bias, crowdsourcing, copyright, information security)

== Through-Course Assessment ==
- Task 1: Create – Applications from Ideas
  - Task Description: Students create computational artifacts through the design and development of programs.
  - Task Time Limit: 9 hours in Class Time
  - Task Response Format
    - Individual Program: Source Code PDF, Personalized Project Reference, and Video
    - Two written questions that will have 4 distinct prompts

Prior to 2021, the first task was the Explore section. The explore section was removed prior to the 2021 exam. The exam prior to 2021 is described as follows:

- Task 1: Explore – Implications of Computing Innovations
  - Task Description: In the classroom, students explore the impacts of computing on social, economic, and cultural areas of our lives
  - Task Time Limit: 8 hours in Class Time
  - Task Response Format
    - Written Response: Innovation: 400 word Max
    - Written Response: Population and Impact : 300 Word Max
    - Visual Artifact: Visualization or Graphic
    - Visual Artifact Summary: 50 Words
    - Evaluate, Archive and Present Task

== Exam ==
- The AP exam is taken on the digital testing application of Bluebook.
- It lasts 180 minutes and includes approximately 72 questions.
- The exam is composed of two sections:
  - 70 Multiple-Choice Questions
    - Single Select Multiple-Choice: Select 1 answer from among 4 options.
    - Multiple Select Multiple-Choice: Select 2 answers from among 4 options.
  - 2 Written Responses

Score	2017	2018	2019	2020	2021	2022	2023	2024	2025	2026
5	13.8%	14.0%	13.8%	10.9%	12.4%	11.4%	11.5%	10.9%	11%	10%
4	21.7%	21.1%	21.0%	23.6%	21.7%	21.0%	20.6%	20%	20%	23%
3	39.1%	36.1%	37.1%	37.1%	32.5%	31.1%	31.1%	33.1%	32%	30%
2	18.3%	19.7%	18.8%	19.8%	19.9%	19.9%	20.5%	20.3%	22%	21%
1	7.2%	9.2%	9.3%	8.6%	13.6%	16.6%	16.4%	15.7%	15%	16%
% of Scores 3 or Higher	74.5%	71.2%	71.9%	71.6%	66.5%	63.5%	63.1%	64%	61.9%	63%
Mean	3.17	3.11	3.11	3.09	2.99	2.91	2.90	2.90	2.87	
Standard Deviation	1.10	1.15	1.14	1.10	1.21	1.23	1.23	1.21		
Number of Students	44,330	72,187	96,105	116,751	116,466	134,651	164,505	175,261	175,174	163,000
