= Palmers Island =

Palmers Island may refer to:

== Places ==
- Palmers Island, New South Wales, Australia
- Palmer Island Light, New Bedford, Massachusetts, USA.
