= USFS Brant =

American fishery patrol vessel

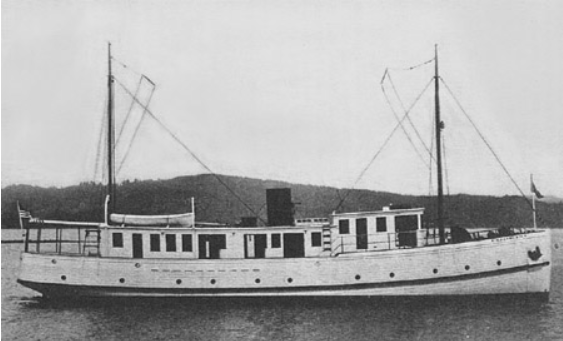
- USFS Brant in 1927

U.S. Bureau of Fisheries
- Name: USFS Brant
- Namesake: Brant, a species of goose of the genus Branta
- Builder: Kruse & Banks, North Bend, Oregon
- Launched: 3 June 1926
- Completed: 1926
- Commissioned: 1926
- Identification: WTDB
- Fate: Transferred to Fish and Wildlife Service 30 June 1940

U.S. Fish and Wildlife Service
- Name: US FWS Brant
- Acquired: 30 June 1940
- Identification: FWS 523
- Fate: Sold 1953

United States
- Name: Brant
- Owner: Foss Launch and Tug Company
- Acquired: 1953
- Fate: Sold 1959

United States
- Name: Brant
- Owner: Joseph and Bernedee Rose
- Acquired: 1959
- Fate: Burned and sank 8 May 1960

General characteristics (as BOF fishery patrol vessel)
- Type: Fishery patrol vessel
- Tonnage: 166 GRT; 67 NRT
- Length: 100 ft (30.5 m)
- Beam: 21 ft (6.4 m)
- Draft: 10 ft (3.0 m)
- Installed power: 1 x 14 hp (10 kW) Union gasoline engine; 110-volt type A4H 150-ampere hour Edison nickel-iron-alkaline storage battery
- Propulsion: As built: 1 x 225 hp (168 kW) six-cylinder direct-reversible Union full diesel engine, one shaft, 3,600 US gallons (14,000 L; 3,000 imp gal) diesel fuel; ca. 1951: 1 x 240 hp (180 kW) Union diesel engine, one shaft, two auxiliary diesel engines, 4,000 US gallons (15,000 L; 3,300 imp gal) diesel fuel
- Speed: As built: 9 to 10.5 knots (16.7 to 19.4 km/h) (average); ca. 1951: 9 knots (17 km/h) (maximum)
- Range: As built: 1,500 nautical miles (2,800 km; 1,700 mi)
- Crew: 9, plus 6 passengers

USFS Brant was an American fishery patrol vessel that operated in the waters of the Territory of Alaska and off Washington, California, and Mexico. She was part of the United States Bureau of Fisheries (BOF) fleet from 1926 to 1940. She then served as US FWS Brant (FWS 523) in the fleet of the Fish and Wildlife Service from 1940 to 1953. She then operated commercially until she sank in 1960.

== Bureau of Fisheries ==
=== Construction and characteristics ===
Coolidge & H. C. Hanson designed Brant for U.S. Bureau of Fisheries fishery patrol service in the Territory of Alaska with an emphasis on the seaworthiness necessary to operate in the exposed waters there. Kruse & Banks constructed her at North Bend, Oregon, and launched her on 3 June 1926. At 100 feet (30.5 m) in length, she was the largest vessel ever to serve in the BOF fleet at the time. She was built of fir and old-growth Port Orford cedar and was of heavy construction. She had a 225-horsepower (168 kW) six-cylinder direct-reversible Union full diesel engine for propulsion, and a 14-horsepower (10 kW) Union gasoline engine powered her air compressor, bilge pump, and electric generator. She had a modern electrical system that included a 110-volt type A4H 150-ampere-hour Edison nickel-iron-alkaline storage battery, a radio, and an Allan Cunningham anchor windlass. She had accommodations for a crew of nine and up to six passengers.

=== Operational history ===
In early July 1926, Brant departed Seattle, Washington, bound for the Territory of Alaska carrying the Commissioner of Fisheries, Henry O'Malley, and Congressman Milton W. Shreve from Pennsylvania's 29th Congressional District; they spent several weeks inspecting Alaska fisheries. After finishing her summer duties in Alaska, she proceeded to San Pedro, California, and spent the winter of 1926–1927 conducting fishery patrols off California and Mexico, encountering severe storms and suffering a broken propeller blade. At one point in 1926, she found herself disabled 5 nautical miles (9.3 km; 5.8 mi) off the Columbia River Bar on the Oregon-Washington border and sent out a distress signal; a United States Coast Guard cutter responded and towed her to safety.

Brant returned to Alaska in March 1927 and established her annual pattern of operations, which involved patrols in Southeast and Southcentral Alaska and occasional operations as far west as Kodiak Island. She often provided transportation for BOF agents and other BOF employees from Seattle to Alaska and between ports and BOF stations in Alaska. She also regularly conducted general fisheries supervisory work. She usually spent winters at Seattle, where she underwent offseason repairs, overhauls, and renovations. By 1928, her pilothouse had undergone extensive modifications.

Brant′s operations changed over time as her responsibilities evolved. During the late 1920s and early 1930s, she conducted patrols each spring off Neah Bay and Cape Flattery on the coast of Washington to protect populations of sea otters and fur seals during their annual northward migration. On 30 June 1929, she departed Seattle with Commissioner O'Malley aboard for a two-month inspection of fisheries in Alaska and of fur sealing operations on the Pribilof Islands in the Bering Sea. Over the winter of 1933–1934, she was among several BOF vessels that underwent extensive renovations at Seattle funded by a US$20,000 appropriation by the Public Works Administration. During the mid- and late 1930s, she operated each autumn in Southeast Alaska, patrolling to protect the local fisheries and conducting surveys of salmon spawning streams.

On 15 July 1938, Brant ran aground on Williams Reef in the Kodiak Archipelago 8 nautical miles (15 km; 9.2 mi) from Kodiak and suffered heavy damage. Two United States Navy seaplane tenders, USS Teal and USS Wright, arrived to render assistance and succeeded in refloating her. Teal then towed her southward and passed the tow to the U.S. Coast Guard cutter USCGC Alert, which towed her the rest of the way to Ketchikan, Territory of Alaska. The BOF fishery patrol vessel USFS Crane then towed her to Seattle, where she underwent extensive repairs.

With her repairs complete, Brant departed Seattle on 4 January 1939 and proceeded to Juneau, Territory of Alaska, where she spent three months providing services in support of the biennial session of the Alaska territorial legislature. While she was at Juneau, she spent two weeks in February 1939 assisting in the search for a Marine Airways passenger plane with six people on board that had been reported missing during a 12 February 1939 flight from Ketchikan to Juneau. In March 1939, she transported several Civilian Conservation Corps workers from Juneau to Little Port Walter at Port Walter, Territory of Alaska.

In his annual report on fisheries in 1939, the chief of the BOF's Division of Alaska Fisheries, Ward T. Bower, referred to Brant as the "flagship of the patrol fleet."

== Fish and Wildlife Service ==
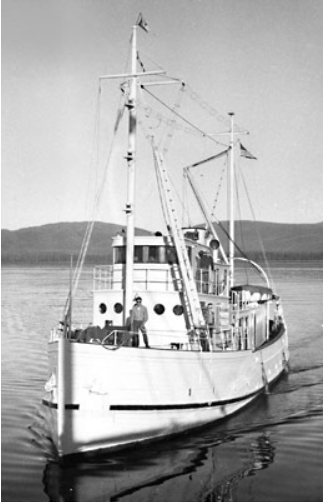
A port bow view of US FWS Brant as she appeared after a major renovation sometime between 1940 and 1953

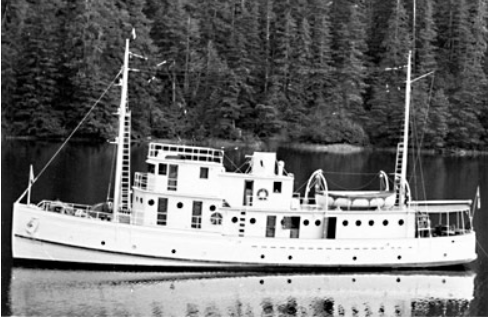
US FWS Brant sometime between 1940 and 1953.

In 1939, the BOF was transferred from the United States Department of Commerce to the United States Department of the Interior, and on 30 June 1940, it was merged with the Interior Department's Division of Biological Survey to form the new Fish and Wildlife Service (FWS), an element of the Interior Department destined to become the United States Fish and Wildlife Service as part of a major reorganization in 1956. The vessel thus became part of the FWS fleet as US FWS Brant (FWS 523).

As late as 1947, Brant remained in use in the FWS fleet as a base of operations for surveying streams; in this role, she served as the mother ship for small FWS skiffs powered by outboard motors which operated in shallow water both to identify obstructions in streams that could interfere with the spawning journeys of salmon and to transport FWS personnel to and from shore. In the 1950s her original engine was replaced by a new 240-horsepower (180 kW) Union diesel engine manufactured at Oakland, California, in 1951 which on average consumed 800 US gallons (3,000 L; 670 imp gal) of diesel fuel a day, and her fuel tanks had a capacity of 4,000 US gallons (15,000 L; 3,300 imp gal). By that time, her main engine and propeller controls were located in her engine room, as were fire and bilge pumps and a battery bank.

Brant's United States Government career ended in 1953, when the FWS sold her to the Foss Launch and Tug Company.

== Later career ==
The Foss Launch and Tug Company based Brant at Los Angeles, California, registering her as a towing vessel and tug. By August 1955, she was laid up at the Craig shipyards in Long Beach, California. In 1959, Foss sold her to Joseph and Bernedee Rose of Los Angeles. The Roses adapted Brant for use as an oil exploration survey vessel.

== Loss ==
On the morning of 8 May 1960, Brant was underway to an oil exploration survey location off Point Conception, California. When her engineer on watch checked her engine room at 06:30, all appeared normal, but soon thereafter a fire broke out in the engine room. Brant′s crew attempted to douse the fire using a fire hose and at first appeared to be bringing the fire under control, but seawater from the fire hose stopped the fire pump driving water through the hose. Brant's ventilation cowls on deck were trained forward and directed fresh air into the engine room, fanning the flames after the fire pump failed. The crew donned life jackets and launched a skiff equipped with an outboard motor in case they had to abandon ship. They were unable to stop Brant, because the fire made it impossible for them to reach her engine controls in the burning engine room, but they did attempt to set Brant on a course toward the shore so that she would beach herself. Finally, with the fire again out of control and no means left aboard to fight it, Brant's captain feared that she might explode and ordered her crew to abandon ship, and they hurriedly jumped overboard. With her engine still running, the unmanned Brant began circling, endangering the men in the water, although her entire crew of eight was rescued by small vessels in the vicinity and survived uninjured.

At 08:33, the U.S. Coast Guard cutter USCGC Cape Sable arrived on the scene to find Brant burning and abandoned. She sprayed firefighting foam and four streams of seawater onto the fire and succeeded in containing it but not in extinguishing it. Brant eventually was brought to a halt by plugging her main engine air intake. Several explosions occurred in Brant′s after hold where oxygen tanks were stowed, and she sank in the Pacific Ocean in 150 feet (46 m) of water off Point Conception at around 14:00.

At the time Brant sank, she was valued at US$40,000 and the oil exploration equipment lost with her at US$45,000. A remotely operated underwater vehicle later identified her debris field on the ocean bottom.
