= Thiel =

Thiel may refer to:

- Thiel (surname), including a list of people with the name
- Thiel (crater), lunar crater named for Walter Thiel
- Thiel Audio, a loudspeaker manufacturer
- Thiel College in Pennsylvania
- Thiel Detective Service Company, a private detective agency
- Thiel Foundation, a private foundation
  - Thiel Fellowship, a fellowship offered by the foundation
- Thiel Mountains of Antarctica
- Thiel Trough, geographical feature

== See also ==
- Thiel-sur-Acolin, commune in France
- Thiel–Behnke dystrophy, a rare form of corneal dystrophy
- Teal (disambiguation), pronounced like "Thiel"
- Thiele (disambiguation)
