= Technology Education and Literacy in Schools =

Technology Education and Literacy in Schools (TEALS) is a program that pairs high schools with software engineers who serve as part-time computer science teachers.

The program was started in 2009 by Microsoft software engineer Kevin Wang, but after Wang's divisional president learned about the program, Microsoft incubated the program. TEALS' goal is to create self-perpetuating computer science programs within two or three years by having the software engineers teach the teachers. Volunteers undergo a three-month summer class that teach them about making lesson plans and leading classes. Afterwards, software engineers visit classrooms four or five mornings a week for the entire school year to teach computer science concepts to both students and teachers.

TEALS volunteers are not required to be Microsoft employees and can have formal degrees or be self-taught in computer science. TEALS offers support for three classes: Introduction to Computer Science, Web Design, and AP Computer Science A.

== History ==
Kevin Wang graduated from the University of California, Berkeley in 2002 with a degree in electrical engineering and computer science. To pursue his teaching passion, he declined several industry job offers. Wang taught in the Bay Area for several years, and attended the Harvard Graduate School of Education, where he received a Master of Education. He became a computer science teacher at Woodside Priory School in Portola Valley, California, teaching grades seven–twelve for three years. He convinced fellow Microsoft employees and other acquaintances to teach computer science at other schools. After joining Microsoft, Wang started volunteering to teach the morning computer science class at Issaquah High School, a nearby high school, in 2009.

In 2009, Wang founded Technology Education and Literacy in Schools (TEALS), a program that aims to bring software engineers to high school classrooms to teach computer science part-time. He thought that he would have to resign from Microsoft to oversee the program's significant expansion. Wang sold his Porsche 911 to bankroll the program. After the vice president of Wang's Microsoft division discovered TEALS, the vice president took him to the divisional president who recommended he work full-time at Microsoft on managing TEALS. According to CNN, Microsoft chose to "incubate" TEALS for three primary reasons. First, the program fit with Microsoft's philanthropic goals. Second, Microsoft founder Bill Gates had an enduring desire to advocate for learning. Third, the software industry had a shortage of engineers. In a 2012 interview with GeekWire, Wang said TEALS has two long-term goals. The first is to give every American high school student the opportunity to take an introductory computer science course and an AP Computer Science course. The second is to have the same proportion of students taking AP Computer Science as those taking AP Biology, AP Chemistry, and AP Physics.

TEALS is part of YouthSpark, a Microsoft initiative that plans to give more educational and employment to 300 million young people between 2012 and 2015. A 2015 article in the Altavista Journal quoted the TEALS website, noting that the United States has 80,000 unfilled jobs that need a computer science degree. The Altavista Journal further reported that this would cause the United States to lose $500 billion over the following 10 years and that only 10% of American high schools have computer science courses. TEALS is managed by Microsoft's Akhtar Badshah, the senior director of citizenship and public affairs.

== Program format ==
Wang designed a three-month summer class for Microsoft employees who wanted to volunteer with TEALS. The class taught the employees about devising lesson plans and leading classes. TEALS aims to create self-perpetuating computer science programs within two or three years. The software engineers commit to being physically present at the school for around four or five days weekly. The classes are scheduled for first period since many volunteers do not start work until later in the morning. For rural schools that lack the capital to run a computer science class, TEALS enables software engineers to instruct students distantly through videoconferencing.

The first two semesters, the software engineers to educate the teachers side by side with the students. The third semester, the software engineers and teachers coteach the students. By the fourth semester, the teachers lead the class, and the software engineers become "teaching assistants". The aim is to enable the teachers who have math and science backgrounds in the future to lead the classes by themselves.

TEALS provides support for three classes. Two of the classes are one-semester long: Introduction to Computer Science and Web Design. The third class, Advanced Placement Computer Science A, is two-semesters long. In a 2015 interview with the Altavista Journal, Microsoft spokesperson Kate Frischmann said, "TEALS is open to everyone, inside and outside of Microsoft, who have a background or formal degree in the field of computer science."

== School participation ==
In the 2010–2011 school year, the program's trial year, ten TEALS volunteers instructed 250 Puget Sound region high school students from four schools. In 2011–2012 school year, TEALS expanded to 30 volunteers and six assistants educating 800 high school students in 13 schools. In the 2012–2013 school year, 22 schools around Seattle participated in TEALS. Microsoft invited the students in Seattle to visit the company's campus, hoping to spark excitement in technology. That school year, TEALS expanded to 120 volunteers in seven states teaching 2,000 students at 37 high schools. The schools were in Washington, Kentucky, California, Virginia, Utah, Washington, D.C., Minnesota, and North Dakota. In the 2013–2014 school year, TEALS grew to 280 volunteers in 12 states educating 3,000 students at 70 schools. In the 2014–2015 school year, 490 TEALS volunteers worked in 131 schools educating 6,600 students.
