= USS Barnett =

US Navy attack transport

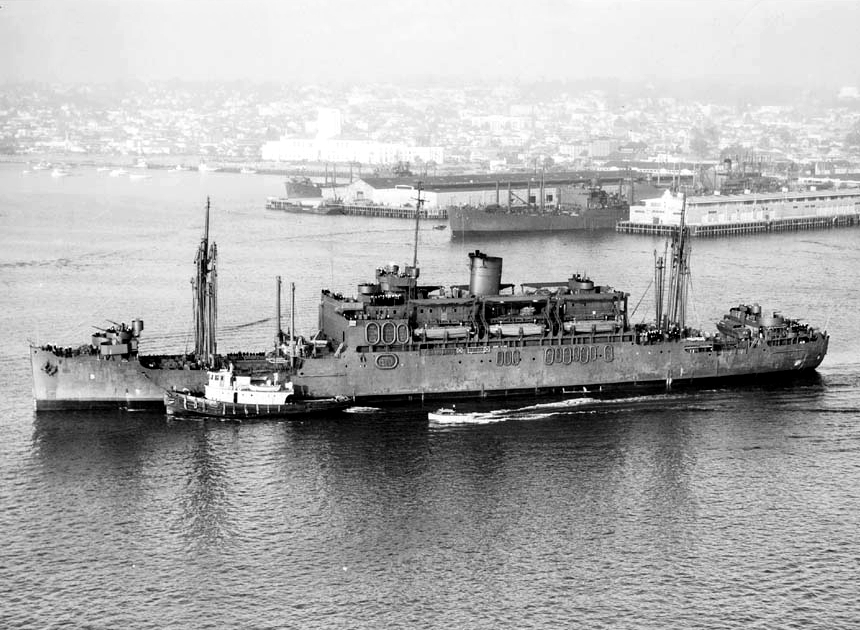
- Barnett on 19 February 1943

History

United States
- Name: Santa Maria (1928—1940); Barnett (1940-1946); Surriento (1948—1966)
- Builder: Furness Shipbuilding Company, England
- Launched: 1928
- Christened: Santa Maria
- Acquired: 11 August 1940
- Commissioned: 25 September 1940
- Decommissioned: 30 April 1946
- Renamed: USS Barnett
- Reclassified: AP-11 to APA-5, 1 February 1943
- Stricken: 21 May 1946
- Honors and awards: Seven battle stars for World War II service
- Fate: Sold 13 April 1948, scrapped 1966

General characteristics
- Class & type: McCawley-class attack transport
- Displacement: ~9,600 tons (fl)
- Length: 486 ft 6 in
- Beam: 63 ft 9 in
- Draft: 25 ft 4 in
- Propulsion: Sulzer diesel drive, 2 x propellers, designed shaft horsepower 8,000
- Speed: 15 knots (sources vary)
- Capacity: Troops: 89 Officers, 1,207 Enlisted; Cargo: 164,561 cu ft
- Complement: 491
- Armament: 1 x 5"/50 cal. dual-purpose gun, 4 x 3"/50 caliber dual-purpose guns, 8 x .50 cal (12.7 mm) machine guns.

USS Barnett (APA-5) was a McCawley-class attack transport that served with the US Navy during World War II.

Barnett was launched in 1928 as the passenger ship Santa Maria by the Furness Shipbuilding Company of Haverton-on-Tees, England for the Grace Line. The ship was purchased by the Navy 11 August 1940 and commissioned 25 September 1940.

== World War II ==
From 25 September 1940 until the end of the year, Barnett was engaged in training Marines in the Culebra-Vieques Islands area. In January 1941 she returned to Norfolk, Virginia for an overhaul which was completed 3 April 1941. Between April and December 1941 she again participated in amphibious and gunnery exercises with Marines. August was spent conducting landing exercises at New River, North Carolina. On 19 February 1942 Barnett sailed from New York City with convoy AT 12 escorted by USS New York (BB-34), USS Quincy (CA-39) and USS Philadelphia (CL-41); and arrived in the British Isles on 2 March 1942. On 15 March 1942 Perelle sank following a collision with Barnett. On 9 April 1942 Barnett left the British Isles with convoy TA 12 escorted by New York and Philadelphia, and returned to New York City on 25 March 1942.

=== Battles of Coral Sea and Midway ===
Barnett moved troops to defensive positions in the southwest Pacific with convoy BT 202 leaving New York City on 9 April 1942, transiting the Panama Canal on 18 April 1942, and arriving in Wellington, New Zealand, on 22 May 1942. Following the Battle of the Coral Sea, Barnett transported 1,360 survivors from USS Lexington (CV-2) from Nouméa to San Diego. Among those survivors were Lexingtons executive officer, Commander Morton T. Seligman, Chicago Tribune war correspondent Stanley Johnston, and dive bomber pilot Robert Dixon, who sent the most remembered message of the Coral Sea battle: "Scratch one flattop." During the trip, Dixon observed Seligman sharing classified message traffic with Johnston including decrypted information about Japanese planning for the Battle of Midway. Johnston's Chicago Tribune article following the battle included information potentially revealing Japanese naval codes were no longer secure. Admiral Ernest King discovered the source of the security breach through Dixon's response to FBI investigators. Japanese cryptography remained unchanged following the article, so Seligman's punishment was a permanent ban on promotion to avoid possible publicity about more formal proceedings. Seligman retired in 1944.

=== Guadalcanal ===
After delivering Lexington survivors to San Diego, Barnett sailed to San Francisco to embark men of the 1st Marines for transport to the South Pacific. Barnett sailed from San Francisco with convoy PW 2095 on 23 June 1942. Assignment of the 1st Marines to the Guadalcanal landing occurred after Barnett had been commercially loaded to cram the most material into available cargo holds. Barnett was assigned to Transport Division B for the Guadalcanal landing carrying the Headquarters, 1st Marines and 1st Battalion, 1st Marines. Barnett arrived in Wellington, New Zealand in early July to reshuffle cargo into combat loading so less important items were under material necessary during the early stages of amphibious assault. Barnett sailed from New Zealand on 22 July for a landing rehearsal on 26 July at Koro Island in Fiji. The landing force then sailed from Koro on 31 July and commenced the Guadalcanal landing on 7 August. Barnett was damaged by a crashing Mitsubishi G4M bomber during an air raid on 8 August. Barnett sailed for Nouméa on 9 August carrying 860 survivors of ships sunk at the Battle of Savo Island. After transporting the 2nd battalion, 8th Marines from Tonga to Guadalcanal in late October, Barnett spent the month of November 1942 shuttling troops and supplies between Tulagi and Guadalcanal. Barnett was anchored off Lunga Point offloading when accompanying USS Alchiba (AKA-6) was torpedoed by midget submarine Ha-10 on 28 November 1942. Barnett carried 94 wounded Marines and 381 American survivors from destroyers sunk at the Naval Battle of Guadalcanal to Espiritu Santo and then transported 866 Northampton survivors from the Battle of Tassafaronga home to San Diego a few days before Christmas.

=== Sicily ===
After a month of west coast shipyard overhaul, Barnett was reclassified APA-5 on 1 February 1943 and transferred to the east coast in March. Barnett loaded troops of the 45th Infantry Division for a Chesapeake Bay landing exercise at Cedar Point, Maryland, on 12 April. Barnett sailed from Norfolk, Virginia, on 10 May 1943 with convoy UGF 8A as flagship of the Third Transport Division commanded by Commodore Campbell Dallas Edgar, escorted by USS Savannah (CL-42) and 12 destroyers, and arrived in Oran, Algeria, on 23 May 1943. On 5 July 1943 Barnett sailed with convoy NCF 1 carrying the 26th Regimental Combat Team with General Theodore Roosevelt Jr. to the Sicilian occupation. Barnett arrived at Gela, Sicily, at 0025 10 July 1943 and began landing troops at 0245 for the Amphibious Battle of Gela. During an Italian SM-79 bombing attack off the coast of Sicily on 11 July 1943, a bomb burst close aboard Barnett's port bow abreast of the forward hatch putting a hole in the hull and causing subsequent flooding. The ship was made to list to starboard to bring the hole above the water line. Seven men were killed and 35 injured; all were Army personnel. On the evening of 12 July Barnett steamed under her own power with convoy CNF 1 to Algiers, Algeria, for repairs, arriving 15 July.

=== Salerno ===
Barnett sailed from Oran with 1,398 troops of the 36th Infantry Division on 5 September 1943 in convoy SNF 1 to the Salerno landings on 9 September, and left Salerno on 10 September with convoy NSF 1 to return to Oran on 14 September. Barnett left Oran on 30 September with 1,011 signal, police, and ordnance specialists in convoy NSF 4 and arrived in Naples, Italy, on 6 October. After offloading, Barnett left Naples on 7 October with convoy SNF 4 and returned to Oran on 10 October. On 25 October Barnett again sailed from Oran with 1,247 men from the 1st Armored Division in convoy NSF 6 arriving in Naples on 28 October and leaving the same day with convoy SNF 6 to return to Oran on 1 November 1943. Barnett then transported 1,383 service force troops to Italy on 13 November and embarked Commonwealth troops to leave Oran with convoy MKF 26, escorted by HMS Glasgow (C21), and arrive in Liverpool, England, on 9 December 1943. Barnett left England on 18 December 1943 with convoy UC 8 and arrived in New York City on 2 January 1944.

=== Normandy ===
After shipyard overhaul, Barnett sailed from New York City with convoy UT 8 on 11 February 1944 to reach Gourock, Scotland, on 23 February 1944. Barnett then made several trips shuttling troops between Gourock and Plymouth, England, and conducting landing exercises in Start Bay in preparation for the invasion of Normandy. On 27 May 1944 Barnett anchored in Tor Bay to load troops of the 2d Battalion of the 4th Infantry Division’s 8th Infantry Regiment. These men were landed on Utah Beach on 6 June before transporting casualties back to Falmouth, England, on 7 June.

=== Southern France ===
Barnett loaded troops at Gourock in late June and delivered those troops to Naples on 16 July. Barnett then sailed from Naples on 13 August 1944 with convoy SF 1A in the first of three trips furnishing logistic support and transporting American and Free French troops from Naples to Cavalaire, St. Tropez, and Marseille during Operation Dragoon. Barnett left France on 20 October and arrived in Norfolk, Virginia, on 8 November 1944.

=== Okinawa ===
After a month of shipyard overhaul at Norfolk, Barnett loaded troops at Newport, Rhode Island, in December, and transported them via the Panama Canal to Long Beach, California, in January. Barnett departed Long Beach on 18 January 1945 and reached Guadalcanal on 9 February. There Barnett embarked elements of the 1st Marine Division and transported them to Ulithi in March as part of Transport Group "Baker" (TG 53.2) for the battle of Okinawa. Barnett arrived off Okinawa on 1 April and was damaged by a friendly fire incident on 6 April. Repairs required return to Seattle on 5 May 1945. Barnett transported 1,163 Army personnel from Seattle to Hawaii in June, and 1,308 troops from Hawaii to Leyte in July. Barnett then transported casualties from the Philippines back to California and was in San Diego when Japan surrendered. Barnett received seven battle stars for her World War II service.

== Decommission ==
Barnett was engaged in "Magic Carpet" duty transporting military personnel back to the United States from Pacific Islands until 9 January 1946, then sailed from San Francisco to Boston in January, was decommissioned at Newport, Rhode Island on 30 April 1946, and struck from the Naval Vessel Register on 21 May 1946.

== Commercial service ==
Barnett was transferred to the War Shipping Administration on 3 July 1946. On 13 April 1948 she was sold to Flotta Lauro, renamed MS Surriento and subsequently refitted as a passenger liner in Genoa. She was used by Flotta Lauro on liner services from Italy to Australia and Central America until 1965, when she was withdrawn. Following a brief charter to ZIM Lines the ship was scrapped in La Spezia, Italy in September 1966.
