= Stanley Johnston =

Australian-American journalist (1900–1962)

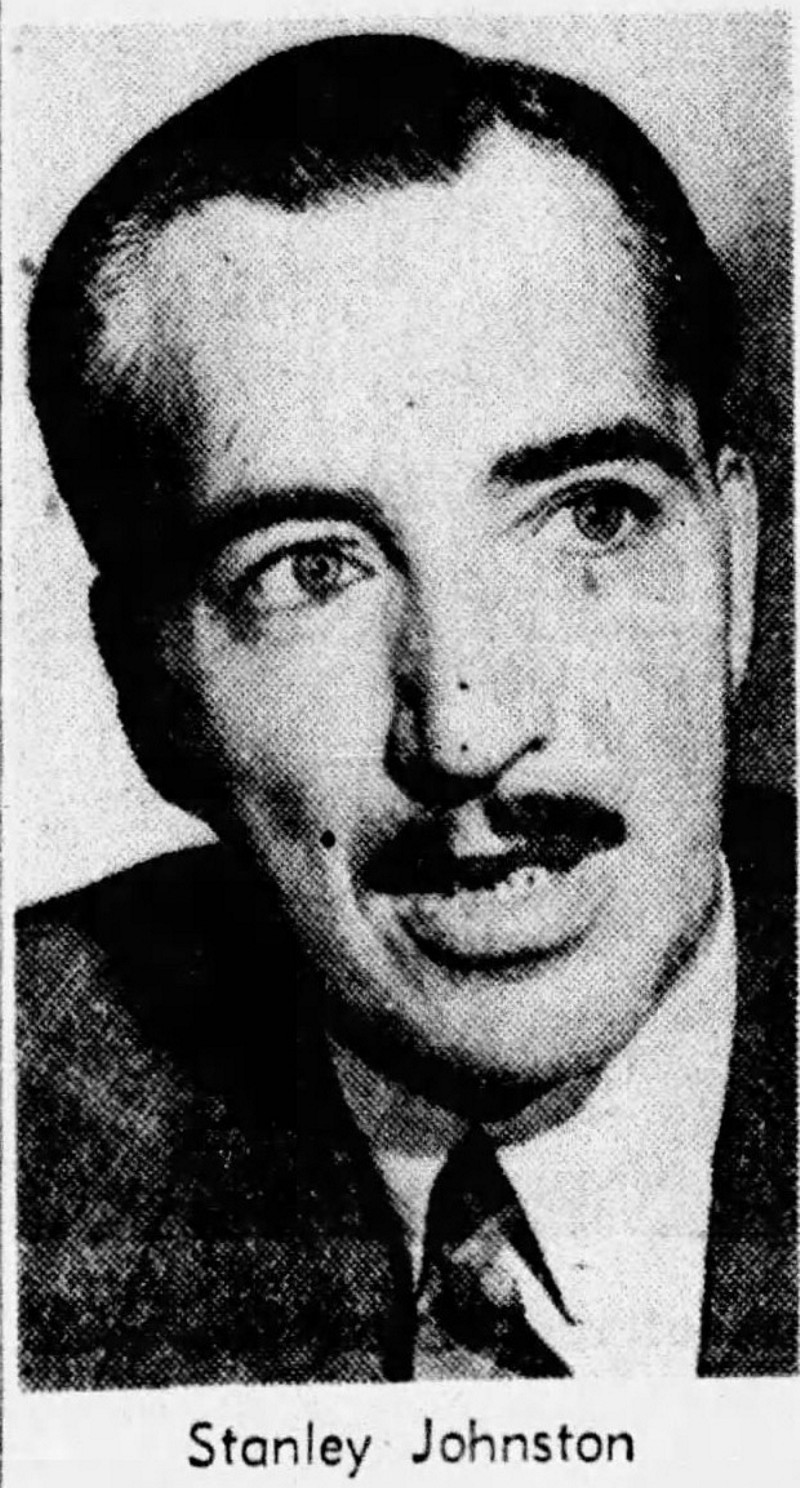
- Born: 1900; Palmers Island, New South Wales
- Died: September 13, 1962 (aged 62); Wheaton, Illinois, U.S.
- Employer: Chicago Tribune
- Known for: Inadvertently revealing classified American code-breaking activities during World War II
- Military career
- Branch: Australian Army
- Conflicts: World War I World War II

Stanley Johnston (1900 – September 13, 1962) was an Australian-American journalist who, as a correspondent during World War II, wrote a story for the Chicago Tribune that inadvertently revealed the extent of American code-breaking activities against the Imperial Japanese Navy (IJN). The story resulted in efforts by the United States government to prosecute Johnston and other Chicago Tribune journalists, an effort what remains the only time the Espionage Act was used against journalists in the United States. No indictment was returned, and grand jury proceedings were sealed until 2016.

== Early life ==
Johnston was born on Palmers Island near Yamba, New South Wales. He joined the Australian Army at the age of 14.

== Career ==
After participating in the Gallipoli Campaign during World War I and ten years of working in gold mines in New Guinea, Johnston embarked on a three-year holiday that took him through the United States and Europe. He met dancer Barbara Beck in New York City in 1936, married her, and took her on a tour through Europe. While in France, he coordinated press dispatches transmitted to and from Europe from a transmitter in Bordeaux, and later the Netherlands. In 1940, as the Netherlands were invaded, he escaped to Lisbon and then London, where he worked as a correspondent for the Chicago Tribune, covering the Battle of Britain. In late-1940, he was called to Chicago where he impressed the newspaper with his knowledge of events in England. About this time, he became an American citizen and was reunited with his wife, who had been repatriated from Paris. Although he was not a trained journalist, he was eventually assigned to a press position aboard the USS Lexington in the Pacific.

=== War correspondent ===
Johnston was the only member of the press aboard Lexington when the aircraft carrier took part in the Battle of the Coral Sea in early May 1942. Following the sinking of the aircraft carrier in the battle Johnston was repatriated aboard the USS Barnett with the Lexington's executive officer, Commander Morton T. Seligman. Seligman had access to naval communications. One general dispatch in late May dealt with American appreciations of Japanese naval movements in the weeks leading up to the June 1942 Battle of Midway, that implied American foreknowledge of events. Johnston claimed he saw the dispatch, "a scrap of paper with doodling on it," which he threw away. Johnston returned to Chicago and published 15 first-hand accounts of the events of the battle. He also wrote an account of the prelude to the Midway action that caused fears in the United States Navy that the Japanese would realize that their codes were broken.

Tribune publisher Robert R. McCormick and President Franklin D. Roosevelt were longtime adversaries and the story infuriated Roosevelt. Secretary of the Navy Frank Knox pressed Attorney General Francis Biddle to prosecute Johnston and others at the Tribune for harm to national security under the Espionage Act of 1917. A grand jury declined to indict, because revealing enemy secrets was not then an offence, and also because the Navy could not release evidence for fear of further compromise. The grand jury testimony remained sealed for 75 years until it was released after successful court action by historians. In the meantime, Seligman was blamed by Navy investigators for the security breach, transferred to shore duty, and denied promotion. The investigation was the only instance in which reporters were ever under threat of prosecution under the Espionage Act.

Johnston authored a book, Queen of the Flat-Tops, in 1942, that recounted his experiences aboard the USS Lexington.

After the war Johnston was a correspondent in Latin America for two years, then returned to Chicago to manage the Tribune's promotions department. In 1955 he became manager of Robert McCormick's Cantigny estate.

== Death ==
Johnston died of an apparent heart attack in Wheaton, Illinois on September 13, 1962, aged 62. His obituary was published on the front page of the Chicago Tribune.
