= Teal, Missouri =

Extinct town in Cole County, Missouri

Coordinates: 38.34170°N 92.24157°W

Teal is an extinct town in Cole County, in the U.S. state of Missouri.

A post office called Teal was established in 1880, and remained in operation until 1912. The community was named after the teal duck.
