= Tael (disambiguation) =

Tael refers to several weight measures of the Far East.

Tael may also refer to:

- A character in The Legend of Zelda: Majora's Mask
- Kaja Tael (born 1960), Estonian philologist, translator, and diplomat
- Texas Academy of Leadership in the Humanities, a high school in Beaumont, Texas, U.S.
