= Tiele =

Tiele may refer to:

- Tiele people, an ancient people of Central Asia
- Tiélé, Mali, a commune and village in Mali
- Cornelis Tiele (1830–1902), Dutch theologian and scholar
