= USS Arctic (AF-7) =

Cargo ship of the United States Navy

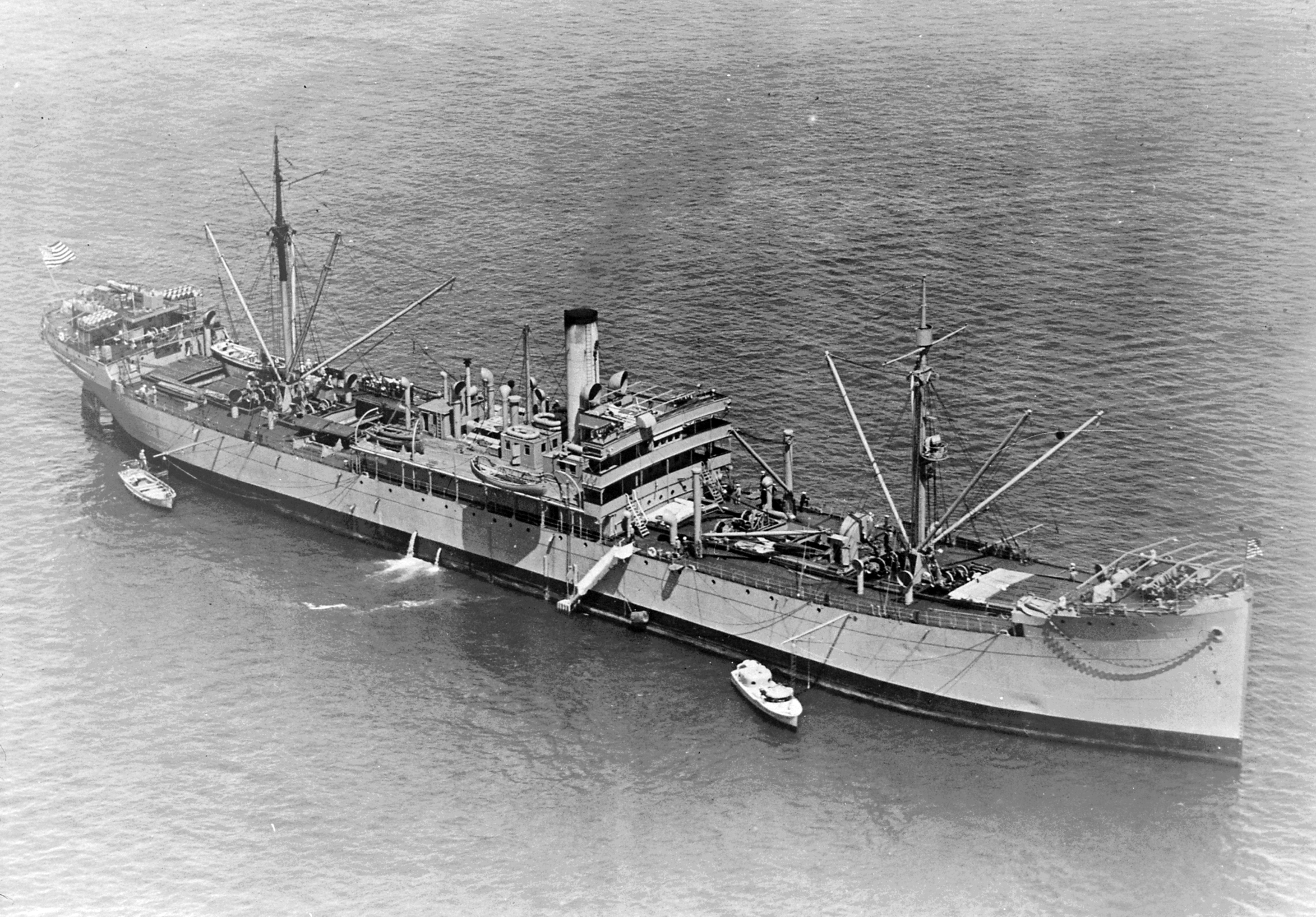
- Arctic on 6 May 1924

History

United States
- Name: USS Arctic
- Laid down: as SS Yamhill
- Launched: 4 July 1918
- Acquired: 4 November 1921
- Commissioned: USS Arctic (AF-7), 7 November 1921
- Decommissioned: 3 April 1946
- Stricken: 1 May 1946
- Fate: Scrapped, 19 August 1947

General characteristics
- Type: Stores ship
- Tonnage: 5,997 GRT; 3,170 DWT
- Displacement: 6,100 long tons (6,198 t) (light), 12,600 long tons (12,802 t) (full load)
- Length: 415 ft 6 in (126.64 m)
- Beam: 53 ft (16 m)
- Draft: 26 ft 5 in (8.05 m)
- Installed power: 2,800 shp (2,100 kW)
- Propulsion: 1 × geared turbine; 1 × shaft
- Speed: 11 kn (13 mph; 20 km/h)
- Complement: 211
- Armament: 1 × 5 in (130 mm)/51 cal gun; 4 × 3 in (76 mm)/50 cal dual purpose guns; 8 × 20 mm anti-aircraft cannons

USS Arctic (AF-7) was an Arctic-class stores ship acquired by the United States Navy shortly after World War I, which saw extensive service in World War II. She served in the Pacific Ocean, delivering food and household items to ships and bases.

== Early career ==
Yamhill – a steel-hulled, single-screw freighter completed in 1919 at Oakland, California, by the Moore Shipbuilding Co. under a United States Shipping Board contract – was acquired by the navy from the Shipping Board on 4 November 1921 for use as a store ship. Renamed Arctic (AF-7) on 2 November 1921, she was commissioned at the New York Navy Yard on 7 November 1921.

Assigned to the Base Force, Pacific Fleet, Arctic arrived at San Diego, California on 24 July 1922. For almost 20 years, she served chiefly in the Pacific, operating with the fleet's train. During the second of her two voyages to Hawaiian waters in 1925, she accompanied the fleet on its Australasian cruise to New Zealand and Samoa. Assigned to Train Squadron 2 (TrainRon 2), her yearly operations varied little, with the ship issuing provisions to the Battle Fleet wherever it was operating. Her cruises along the western seaboard of the United States took her to San Diego, San Pedro and San Francisco, California, Portland, Oregon, and Seattle, Washington.

During the winter of 1936/1937, Arctic found herself busier than ever. A maritime strike, which paralyzed American flag merchant shipping during this period, meant a revision in the storeship's operating schedule. As Commander, Base Force, reported after the end of the fiscal year, the shipping strike emphasized the limitations of the train, since Arctic had to be withdrawn from servicing the fleet to provision the far-flung naval stations at Pearl Harbor and Samoa. Since the fleet operated in Hawaiian waters with increasing frequency, starting with the Hawaiian Detachment in the fall of 1939 and continuing through the assignment of the Fleet there in the spring of 1940, Arctic's schedule was altered to include five or six round trips a year between San Francisco and Pearl Harbor. The outbreak of hostilities with Japan on 7 December 1941 found Arctic one day out of Hawaiian waters, en route to San Francisco.

== World War II ==
For the first five months of 1942, a time punctuated with yard periods at the Mare Island Navy Yard, Arctic operated between Pearl Harbor and San Francisco. She then deployed briefly to Alaskan waters, to supply the ships of Task Force 8 (TF 8) and shore facilities at Kodiak from 3–13 July. Returning thence to the west coast, she arrived at San Francisco on 24 July and soon thereafter sailed for the South Pacific. After touching en route at Pearl Harbor and at Tongatapu, Arctic commenced a routine of supplying ships and shore stations at New Caledonia and in the New Hebrides. Before 1942 was over, the storeship visited Nouméa twice and Espiritu Santo once. During the following year, 1943, she voyaged twice to Nouméa, thrice to Espiritu Santo, and once to Efate, usually stopping at Samoa en route from the Hawaiian Islands. An overhaul at Alameda, California and at Oakland from 4 July-27 September broke this period of operations. Following her third call at Espiritu Santo from 23 October-5 November, Arctic returned again to the U.S. West Coast for engine repairs, reaching San Francisco on 29 November and remaining there into the following year.

Departing the west coast on 29 January 1944, the storeship arrived at Pearl Harbor on 8 February. Assigned thence to Service Squadron 8 (ServRon 8) over the next six months, Arctic made five round-trip voyages to the Marshall Islands, provisioning ships at Majuro, Kwajalein, and Eniwetok. Shifting to Seeadler Harbor – at Manus – on 20 September, the auxiliary ship spent the next month issuing supplies to various units afloat before she proceeded to Ulithi on 24 October.

Remaining at Ulithi, temporarily attached to ServRon 10, until a week before Christmas, 1944, Arctic provided working parties for various merchant ships and took on board supplies for issue to the fleet until she commenced a series of round-trip voyages from Ulithi to the Palau Islands; she conducted four such voyages from 18 December 1944 – 1 April 1945 to provision ships and shore installations at Kossol Roads, Peleliu, and Angaur. Touching at Saipan on 5 April, Arctic proceeded to Iwo Jima, where – from 9–12 April – she provisioned island forces, various units of the Pacific Fleet, and small craft.

Returning to Guam on 15 April, the "beef boat" then sailed for the United States. A severe tropical storm enlivened her passage home before she arrived at San Francisco on 12 May. Sailing for the west again on 2 July, Arctic arrived at Ulithi on the 26th before she proceeded, in convoy UOK-43, for Okinawa, where – from 5–21 August – she issued fresh, frozen and dry provisions to fleet units. After Japan capitulated, she returned to Pearl Harbor on 11 September for repairs and reloading, before sailing for Japanese waters on 24 October. While en route to Tokyo, she sank a mine with gunfire on 12 November.

From 21 November-13 December, Arctic provisioned fleet units off Yokosuka before she returned to Hawaiian waters – again sinking a mine en route – on 20 December. She departed Pearl Harbor on 2 January 1946 and arrived at San Diego on the 16th, where she remained for a little over a month. She left the west coast of the United States for the last time on 18 February, bound for the Gulf of Mexico. Material defects having rendered continued operation of the venerable Arctic "impracticable," the veteran "beef boat" was on her last voyage. Transiting the Panama Canal on 7 March, Arctic arrived at New Orleans, Louisiana on the 15th. There, at Pendleton Shipyards, she was decommissioned on 3 April. Her name was struck from the Naval Vessel Register on 1 May. Transferred to the Maritime Commission for disposition on 3 July, the ship was then sold on 19 August 1947 to the Southern Shipwrecking Corp. and met her end under the scrapper's torch.
