= Morton T. Seligman =

American naval aviator (1895–1967)

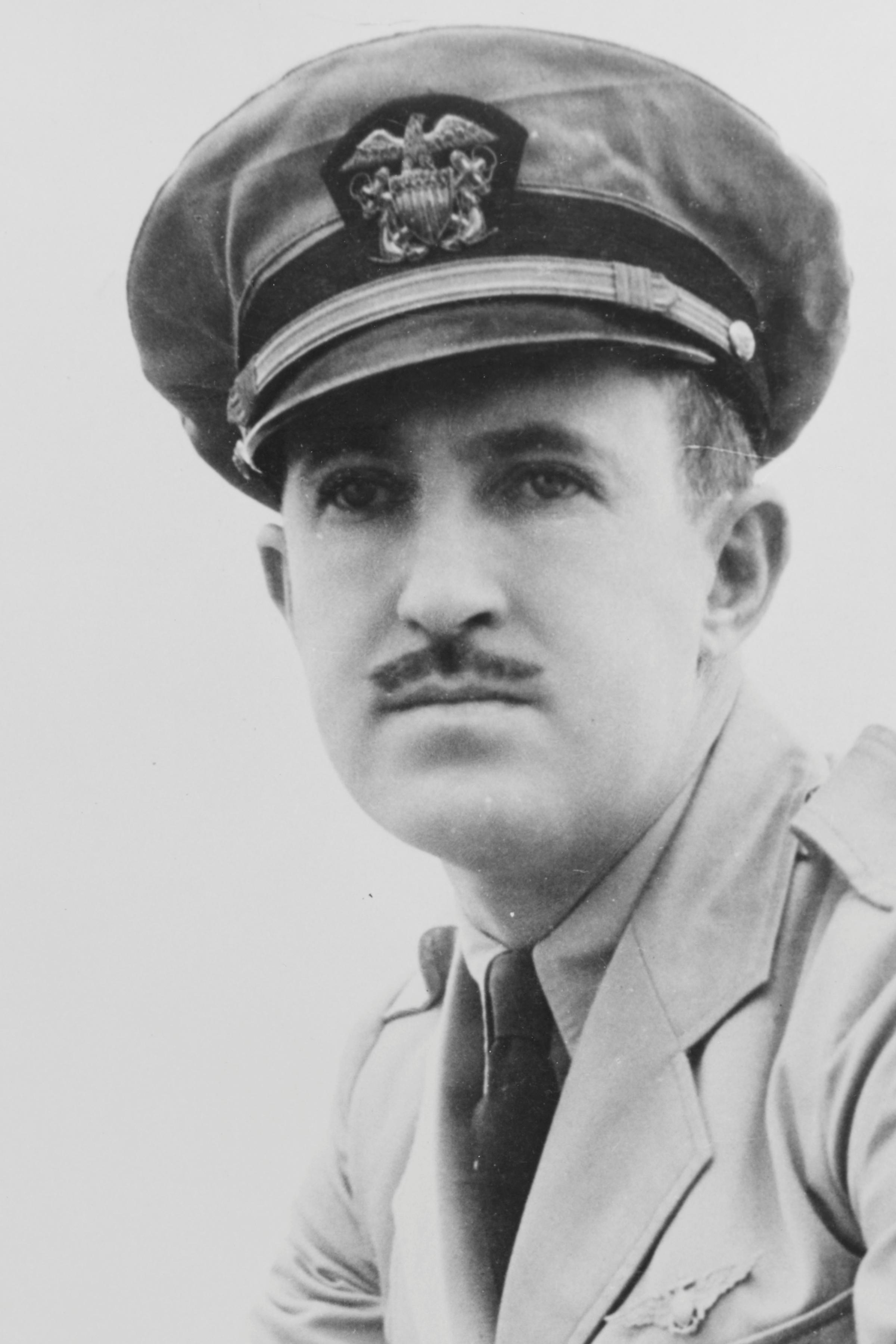
Morton Seligman as a Lieutenant in the early 1930s

Morton T. Seligman (July 1, 1895 – July 9, 1967) was an American naval aviator. A two-time recipient of the Navy Cross, Seligman was involved in a security breach in 1942 which brought to an end his promising naval career and forced his retirement in 1944.

== Early life and naval career ==
Morton Tinslar Seligman was born on July 1, 1895, in Salt Lake City, Utah, in a family of New Mexico pioneers.

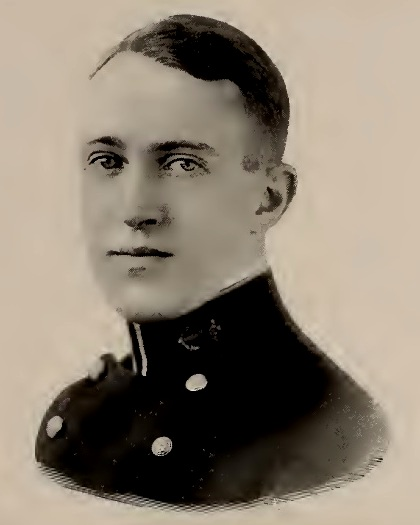
Senior Class Portrait of Midshipman Seligman

Seligman graduated from the U.S. Naval Academy in 1918, in the three-year class of 1919. Immediately following World War I Lieutenant (j.g.) Seligman commanded the former submarine chaser SC-272 on minesweeping operations in the North Sea. He was awarded his first Navy Cross for this historically important work. He then became a naval aviator and was assigned to the aircraft carrier USS Saratoga by 1929. Promoted to Lieutenant Commander, he was commander of the Tophatters fighter squadron in 1933–34. In 1938 Seligman was carrier air group commander on the USS Ranger. In 1939 he was appointed operations officer at North Island Naval Air Station in San Diego and became the station's executive officer in 1941.

In 1940 Seligman was a technical advisor in a major Hollywood movie production, Flight Command. Promoted to Commander, he became the executive officer of the USS Lexington in 1941. He served in that post through the Battle of the Coral Sea in which the Lexington was sunk after which he was awarded a gold star decoration for his Navy Cross for his service in that action, in lieu of a second award of the Navy Cross. Seligman was credited with effective management of the ship's damage control parties in an ultimately hopeless effort, allowing the ship to be abandoned in an orderly manner with relatively small loss of life. He was one of the last men to leave the ship.

== Tribune incident ==
Many of the survivors of the Lexington were repatriated back to the United States aboard the USS Barnett. Among the Barnett's passengers was Australian-American journalist Stanley Johnston, who had been the sole journalist present aboard the Lexington during the Coral Sea action. Reporting for the Chicago Tribune, Johnston was on his way back to file his stories about those events. Seligman knew Johnston and may have shared a cabin with him aboard the Barnett. Johnston obtained access to a fleet dispatch containing an intelligence estimate of Japanese forces immediately before the 1942 Midway action that indicated clear foreknowledge of Japanese intentions and movements, a document to which Seligman had access. Johnston's subsequent story in the Tribune raised alarm in the White House and Navy that the Japanese, reading the story, would realize that their codes were broken and that they would change ciphers.

At the urging of President Franklin D. Roosevelt, who viewed the Tribune and its publisher as an enemy, and Secretary of the Navy Frank Knox, Attorney General Francis Biddle was pressed to prosecute Johnston and others at the Tribune for harm to national security under the Espionage Act. At the same time the Navy investigated the source of the breach. No indictments were forthcoming from the grand jury that was convened, in part because the necessary evidence was too sensitive for use in a trial. Investigators established that officers on board the Barnett were careless in their handling of sensitive material, and that Johnston was able to see some of it. Seligman was blamed for the leak, but due to wartime secrecy was not brought before any formal hearing. Instead, Seligman was assigned to shore duty, an unusual situation for a high-ranking decorated officer who up to that time had been on track to flag rank. Promotion to Captain, the expected next step, was denied him after the Chief of Naval Operations, Fleet Admiral Ernest King, in a most unique action for King, personally intervened with the selection board to prevent promotion. After almost two years ashore, Seligman retired in 1944.

Although promotion was denied Seligman on active service, on his retirement Seligman was granted a "tombstone promotion" to Captain. (At that time, naval officers who had previously been officially commended for action in combat were customarily given "tombstone promotions" upon retirement, which granted them a one-grade promotion with entitlement to the grade and courtesies associated with that rank, but not the pay.) In 1945 he was a technical advisor on the movie A Bell for Adano. Seligman died at age 71 at the Naval Hospital Balboa in San Diego on July 9, 1967. He was survived by his wife Adelia (September 14, 1898 – July 1, 1981) and his mother. Seligman and his wife are interred at Santa Fe National Cemetery in New Mexico.
