= USS Sandpiper (AM-51) =

Minesweeper of the United States Navy

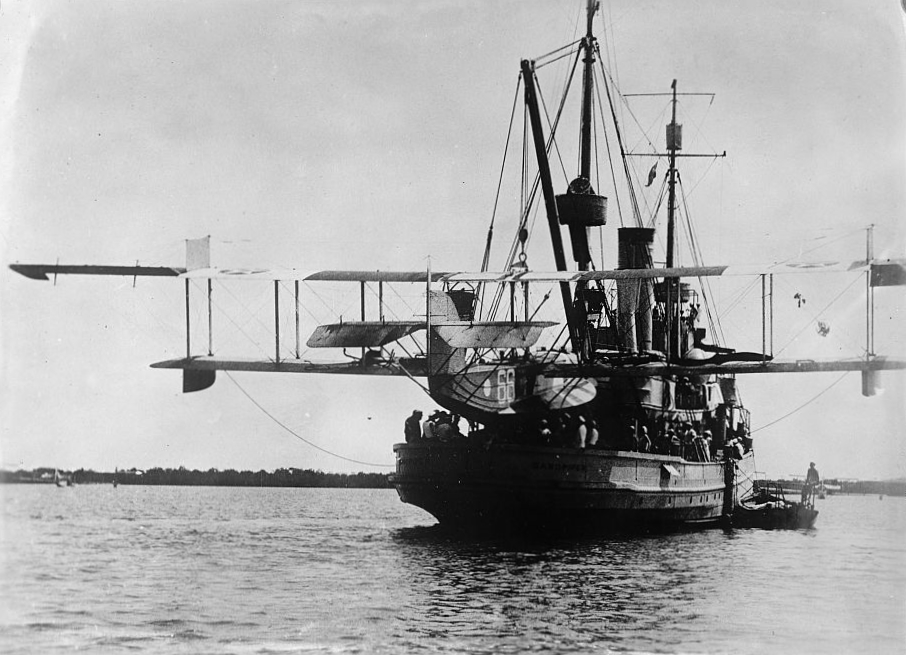
- The ship in 1922 with aircraft

History

United States
- Name: USS Sandpiper
- Builder: Philadelphia Navy Yard, Philadelphia, Pennsylvania
- Laid down: 15 November 1918
- Launched: 28 April 1919
- Commissioned: 9 October 1919, as Minesweeper No.51
- Decommissioned: 10 December 1945
- Reclassified: AM-51, 17 February 1920; AVP-9, 22 January 1936
- Stricken: 17 April 1946
- Fate: Transferred to Maritime Commission, 12 October 1946

General characteristics
- Class & type: Lapwing-class minesweeper
- Displacement: 840 long tons (853 t)
- Length: 187 ft 10 in (57.25 m)
- Beam: 35 ft 6 in (10.82 m)
- Draft: 10 ft 4 in (3.15 m)
- Speed: 14 knots (26 km/h; 16 mph)
- Complement: 78
- Armament: 2 × 3 in (76 mm) guns; 2 × machine guns

USS Sandpiper (AM-51) was a Lapwing-class minesweeper. Laid down on 15 November 1918 at the Philadelphia Navy Yard, Philadelphia, Pennsylvania, and launched on 28 April 1919, USS Sandpiper (Minesweeper No.51) was commissioned on 9 October 1919, redesignated AM-51 on 17 February 1920, and reclassified as a Small Seaplane Tender, AVP-9 on 22 January 1936.

== USS Sandpiper mission ==
Although built as a minesweeper, Sandpiper performed aircraft tender duties throughout her career. Her assignments moved her from Train, Scouting Fleet; to Aircraft Squadrons, Scouting Fleet; to Aircraft Squadrons, Battle Fleet; to various individual squadrons and finally to patrol units and training commands.

Her duties — initially restricted to guarding plane flights, fueling planes, and towing seaplane barges — were gradually expanded. Transportation of aviation spares and personnel came with extended operations and new bases. Salvage and repair duties were added to her search and rescue work and were retained until ships designed for the purpose were built in the 1930s. The minesweeper/aircraft tender, however, was designated AM-51 in July 1920 and retained that hull number for over 15 years. On 22 January 1936, she was officially reclassified as a small seaplane tender and redesignated AVP-9.

== North Atlantic operations ==
Based at New York City and then at Norfolk, Virginia, through the 1920s and into the 1930s, Sandpiper operated with the fleet, off the mid-Atlantic and New England coasts during the summer and fall and in the Caribbean and Gulf of Mexico during the winter. Each spring, she returned north. While deployed for winter maneuvers, she participated in annual fleet problems, including problems I (February 1923) and IX (January 1929) in which the use of aircraft allowed the attacking force to break through, and render obsolete, the defenses of the Panama Canal Zone.

== Pacific Ocean operations ==
In January 1932, Sandpiper was reassigned to the Pacific and, for several years after her arrival on 20 February at San Diego, California, her new base, she provided services for seaplanes along the west coast. During the summer of 1935, she served with the Navy's Aleutian Survey Expedition as it concluded extensive surveys of the Andreanof and Rat Island groups and used aircraft equipped with multi-lens cameras to expand cartographic data on the chain and to improve methods of aerial photogrammetry.

== Central American operations ==
Toward the end of the decade, Sandpiper shifted to the Panama Canal Zone. From Coco Solo, her duties took her along the Central and South American coasts for survey expeditions and exercises and into the Caribbean for temporary assignments to various patrol units stationed in Cuba, Puerto Rico, and the Virgin Islands. During 1940 and 1941, she was attached to the Caribbean bases, particularly Trinidad, more frequently and for extended periods. With the entry of the United States into World War II, her previously limited escort duties were increased.

== World War II North Atlantic operations ==
Sandpiper remained in the Caribbean into the spring of 1942. She then underwent repairs and overhaul at San Juan, Puerto Rico, and Charleston, South Carolina. In October, she moved north to Boston, Massachusetts, whence she continued on to Greenland, arriving at Kangat Bay on 11 November. For the next four months, she conducted escort runs between Kangat Bay and Narsarsuaq; carried out search and rescue missions; and performed local defense duties.

== Damaged in ship collision ==
In March 1943, she returned to Boston, Massachusetts; then, at the end of the month, she proceeded to Casco Bay where she conducted exercises for students at the Anti-submarine Training School. In June, she again moved north to Argentia, Newfoundland, whence she escorted and carried aviation fuel for Ranger (CV-4). On the 23rd, however, while operating to the south of Cape Farewell, she was rammed on the port quarter by a British merchant ship which tore a hole in her hull and seriously damaged her steering gear. Emergency repairs enabled her to reach Argentia, whence she was routed, via Sydney and Halifax, to Boston, Massachusetts, to complete the work.

== World War II South Atlantic operations ==
On 28 August, Sandpiper cleared Boston harbor and sailed south to Brazil for duty with Fleet Air Wing 16. She arrived at Recife, Brazil, on 30 September; and, for the next nine months, served as a support ship carrying supplies to various bases along the Brazilian coast. In June 1944, she returned to the United States; underwent overhaul at Norfolk, Virginia; and, in September, got underway for Key West, Florida, where she remained, attached to the Training Detachment, Fleet Air Wing 5, until after the end of the war in Europe.

== End-of-war activities ==
In late June 1945, Sandpiper returned to Norfolk, Virginia, whence, after brief duty as a target-towing ship, she was ordered to Pearl Harbor. She arrived in Hawaii on 17 August, two days after the end of hostilities in the Pacific. A month later, she was ordered back to the east coast and steamed, via San Diego, California, and the Panama Canal, to Boston, Massachusetts, arriving there at the end of October.

== Decommissioning ==
Sandpiper was decommissioned on 10 December 1945 at Boston, Massachusetts, struck from the Naval Vessel Register on 17 April 1946, and transferred to the Maritime Commission on 12 October 1946 for disposal. Fate unknown.
