= William P. Lawrence =

United States naval officer and pilot

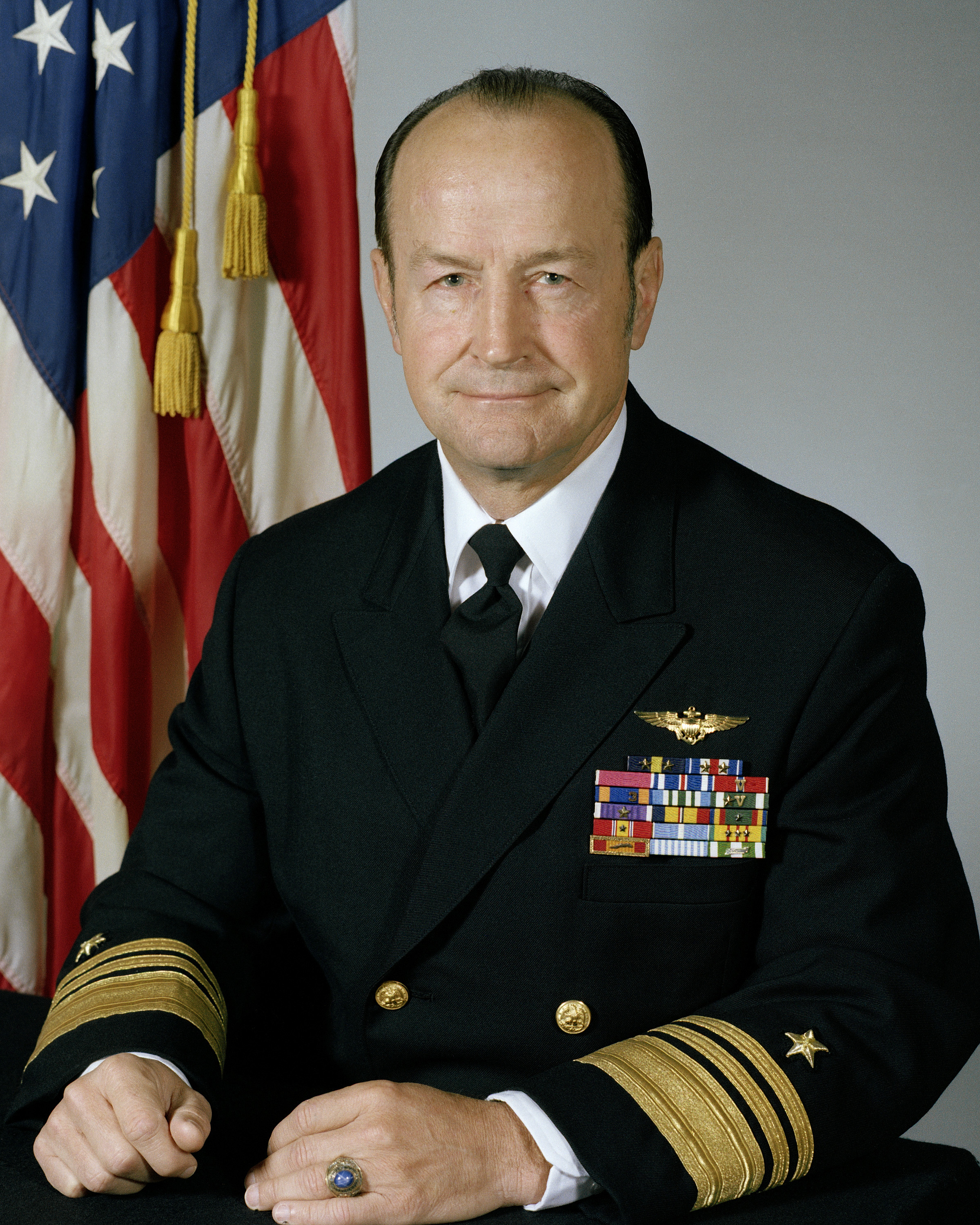
- Lawrence in September 1983
- Born: January 13, 1930; Nashville, Tennessee, U.S.
- Died: December 2, 2005 (aged 75); Crownsville, Maryland, U.S.
- Burial place: United States Naval Academy Cemetery
- Relatives: Captain Wendy B. Lawrence (daughter)
- Military career
- Allegiance: United States
- Branch: United States Navy
- Service years: 1951–1986
- Rank: Vice Admiral
- Nickname: "Bill"
- Commands: United States Pacific Fleet; United States Naval Academy; United States Third Fleet; Chief of Naval Personnel; Fighter Squadron 143
- Conflicts: Korean War; Vietnam War
- Awards: Navy Distinguished Service Medal (4); Silver Star (3); Legion of Merit; Distinguished Flying Cross; Bronze Star Medal; Purple Heart (2); Air Medal (3)
- Other work: President of the Association of Naval Aviation

William Porter "Bill" Lawrence (January 13, 1930 – December 2, 2005) was a decorated United States Navy vice admiral and Naval Aviator who served as Superintendent of the United States Naval Academy from 1978 to 1981. Lawrence was a noted pilot, the first Naval Aviator to fly twice the speed of sound in a naval aircraft, and one of the final candidates for the Mercury space program. During the Vietnam War, Lawrence was shot down while on a combat mission and spent six years as a prisoner of war, from 1967 to 1973. During this time, he became noted for his resistance to his captors.

== Early life and education ==
Lawrence's parents and grandparents were from Tennessee. His father Robert Landy "Fatty" Lawrence (1903–1976) attended Vanderbilt University, where he was a noted student-athlete who graduated in 1924. He was born January 13, 1930, in Nashville, and attended local schools. Lawrence distinguished himself not just as an outstanding student academically, graduating first in his class and being a student body president, but also as a student athlete at Nashville's West End High School, and in 1947 turned down a scholarship for Yale University to attend the United States Naval Academy.

== Naval career ==
Lawrence stood out as a varsity athlete in three sports at the Naval Academy: football, basketball, and baseball. During his time at the academy, he held several high-ranking midshipman offices, including commander of the Brigade of Midshipmen, president of the Class of 1951, while also graduating 8th academically out of a class of 725. His other major accomplishments included helping to establish the honor concept governing midshipmen's conduct. He graduated from the U.S. Naval Academy with a Bachelor of Science degree in electrical engineering in 1951. Ensign Lawrence continued on at the Naval Academy as aide to the Commandant of Midshipmen until September 1951, when he reported to flight training.

Lawrence became a Naval Aviator in 1952. After completing advanced flight training, All Weather Flight School, and Jet Training, then-Lieutenant Lawrence served as an F2H Banshee pilot with VF-193 at NAS Moffett Field from March 1953 to October 1955. During this time, he deployed to Korea aboard the aircraft carrier USS Oriskany from March to April 1953. After aviation safety training with the University of Southern California (USC), he attended the U.S. Naval Test Pilot School at the Naval Air Test Center, Naval Air Station Patuxent River, Maryland, where he received the Outstanding Student Award with the Test Pilot School Class 16, and became a test pilot. When the National Aeronautics and Space Administration (NASA) established the crewed spaceflight program, Lawrence became part of Project Mercury and made it to the final round of candidates. He was cut from the program only because of a bicuspid aortic valve discovered during testing, which rendered him ineligible to be an astronaut.

=== Vietnam War ===
In 1967, then-Commander Lawrence was serving as commanding officer of Fighter Squadron 143 (VF-143), aboard the aircraft carrier USS Constellation. On 28 June 1967, Lawrence and his radar intercept officer, Lieutenant, junior grade James W. Bailey, were flying an F-4B Phantom II aircraft, Bureau Number 152242, while leading an anti-aircraft suppression section during a raid northwest of Nam Dinh, North Vietnam. Their aircraft was struck by an 85 mm round while rolling in on target. Despite failing hydraulics, Lawrence and Bailey released their bombs, but part of the aircraft's tail section separated while attempting to pull out of a dive. Both officers were forced to eject, were captured, and were held as prisoners of war at the Hỏa Lò Prison (the Hanoi Hilton) – until 1973, during which time they suffered repeated torture and beatings. Along with fellow prisoner James Stockdale, Lawrence became noted for his resistance to his captors. Additionally, he memorized every POW by name and rank while in captivity. He developed a code by tapping on the prison walls to communicate with other prisoners. Bailey was released on 18 February 1973 and Lawrence on 4 March 1973. Another fellow inmate was future presidential candidate and Senator John McCain. In Lawrence's obituary in the Los Angeles Times, McCain stated, "He's probably the greatest man I've ever known in my life," and that it was the former's "...constant, steadfast, inspirational, yet very rational leadership that guided many of us through some very difficult times." He was among the 591 Americans released as part of Operation Homecoming. Lawrence documented his POW experience in Al Santoli's Everything We Had.

==== Author of Tennessee State poem ====
While a prisoner of war, Lawrence mentally composed poetry to help keep up his spirits. During a 60-day period of solitary confinement, he composed, by memory, the poem "Oh Tennessee, My Tennessee," in honor of his native state. In 1973, the Tennessee State Legislature adopted the poem as Tennessee's official state poem.

Oh Tennessee, My Tennessee
What Love and Pride I Feel for Thee.
You Proud Ole State, the Volunteer,
Your Proud Traditions I Hold Dear.

I Revere Your Heroes
Who Bravely Fought our Country's Foes.
Renowned Statesmen, so Wise and Strong,
Who Served our Country Well and Long.

I Thrill at Thought of Mountains Grand;
Rolling Green Hills and Fertile Farm Land;
Earth Rich with Stone, Mineral and Ore;
Forests Dense and Wild Flowers Galore;

Powerful Rivers that Bring us Light;
Deep Lakes with Fish and Fowl in Flight;
Thriving Cities and Industries;
Fine Schools and Universities;
Strong Folks of Pioneer Descent,
Simple, Honest, and Reverent.

Beauty and Hospitality
Are the Hallmarks of Tennessee.

And O'er the World as I May Roam,
No Place Exceeds my Boyhood Home.
And Oh How Much I Long to See
My Native Land, My Tennessee.

=== Post-Vietnam War service ===
Following repatriation and convalescence at the Naval Hospital in Memphis, Lawrence attended the National War College in Washington D.C., where he was designated a distinguished graduate. During the same period, he attended George Washington University, receiving his master's degree in international affairs in July 1974.

After promotion to Rear admiral in July 1974, Lawrence served as Commander, Light Attack Wing, U.S. Pacific Fleet at Naval Air Station Lemoore, California. Subsequently, he served as the Director, Aviation Programs Division and Assistant Deputy Chief of Naval Operations (Air Warfare) in The Pentagon. He was promoted to Vice admiral on August 1, 1980. Lawrence assumed command of the U.S. Third Fleet in Pearl Harbor, Hawaii, in September 1981. In 1983, he won the Hawaii Armed Forces singles tennis championship in the seniors division (over 45). On 28 September 1983, he became the Deputy Chief of Naval Operations (Manpower, Personnel and Training)/Chief of Naval Personnel, responsible for formulating and executing Navy policies on personnel and training matters. During his period, he was dubbed by the men and women in the fleet as the "Sailor's Admiral".

Lawrence served as Superintendent of the U.S. Naval Academy from August 1978 to August 1981. The Naval Academy was opened to women starting with the Class of 1980 (inducted July 1976). His daughter Wendy Lawrence was part of the Class of 1981, the second USNA class to include female graduates. Wendy Lawrence followed in her father's footsteps in becoming a naval aviator, and eventually became an astronaut.

He retired on February 1, 1986, and subsequently occupied the Chair of Naval Leadership at the Naval Academy until 1994. He also served as the President of the Association of Naval Aviation from 1991 to 1994.

== Awards and decorations ==

Naval Aviator badge
Navy Distinguished Service Medal w/ four 5/16" Gold Stars
| Silver Star w/ two 5/16" Gold Stars | Legion of Merit | Distinguished Flying Cross |
| Bronze Star w/ Combat "V" | Purple Heart w/ one 5/16" Gold Star | Air Medal w/ Strike/Flight Numeral 3 |
| Joint Service Commendation Medal | Navy and Marine Corps Commendation Medal w/ Combat "V" one 5/16" Gold Star | Combat Action Ribbon |
| Navy Unit Commendation w/ one 3/16" award star | Prisoner of War Medal | National Defense Service Medal w/ one 3/16" Bronze Star |
| Korean Service Medal | Vietnam Service Medal w/ three 3/16" silver stars | Republic of Vietnam Gallantry Cross Unit Citation w/ Palm and Frame |
| United Nations Korea Medal | Vietnam Campaign Medal | Republic of Korea War Service Medal |

== Honors ==
- In 1984, the NCAA selected him for their highest honor, the Theodore Roosevelt Award, recognizing Lawrence as one "For whom competitive athletics in college and attention to physical well-being have been important factors in a distinguished career of national significance and achievement."
- In 2000, the Naval Academy recognized Lawrence's contributions to his alma mater by presenting him with one of its Distinguished Graduate Awards.
- In 2004, Admiral Lawrence was inducted into the Tennessee Sports Hall of Fame in recognition of his athletic achievements both in high school and college.
- In 2009, the U.S. Navy named the Arleigh Burke-class destroyer USS William P. Lawrence (DDG-110) in his honor, sponsored by his widow and daughters.
- On October 17, 2008, a bronze statue of Vice Admiral William P. Lawrence was dedicated at the Naval Academy. The statue was a gift of the Naval Academy graduate and business tycoon H. Ross Perot.

== Personal life ==
When Lawrence returned from captivity in Vietnam in 1973, he found that his wife had remarried. The following year, he married Diane Wilcox Raugh.

Lawrence died December 2, 2005, at home in Crownsville, Maryland, at the age of 75. He was survived by his second wife, daughters Wendy and Laurie, son William Jr. and stepson Frederick. Lawrence was buried at the United States Naval Academy Cemetery at Annapolis, Maryland, on December 14, 2005.

Wendy Lawrence followed her father into the Navy and attained the rank of Captain. Like her father, she became a Naval Aviator. She later became a NASA astronaut and flew four Space Shuttle missions. Her sister, Dr. Laurie Lawrence, attended Vanderbilt University—her paternal grandfather's alma mater—and is a physician at the Vanderbilt University Medical Center.

== See also ==
- List of prisoners of war
- Aircraft losses of the Vietnam War
- U.S. prisoners of war during the Vietnam War
- List of superintendents of the United States Naval Academy

Academic offices
| Preceded by Kinnaird R. McKee | Superintendent of United States Naval Academy; 1978–1981 | Succeeded by Edward C. Waller |
