= Superintendent of the United States Naval Academy =

- Seal of the U.S. Naval Academy

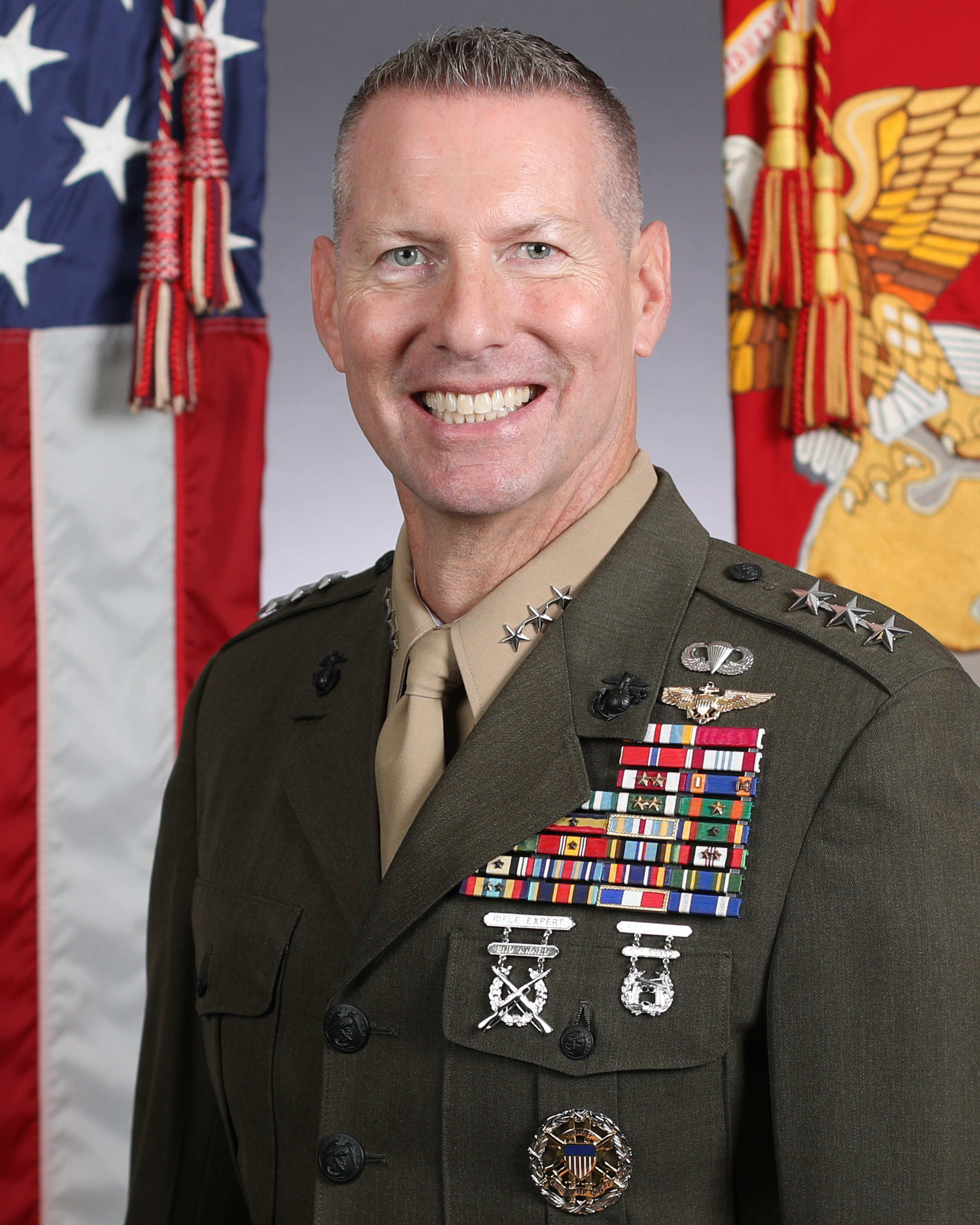
- Incumbent; Michael Borgschulte since July 2025
- Reports to: Chief of Naval Operations
- Formation: 1845
- First holder: Franklin Buchanan
- Website: https://www.usna.edu/PAO/Superintendent/

The superintendent of the United States Naval Academy is its commanding officer. The position is a statutory office (10 U.S.C. § 8451a), and is roughly equivalent to the chancellor or president of an American civilian university. The officer appointed is, by tradition, a graduate of the United States Naval Academy. However, this is not an official requirement for the position.

The United States Naval Academy is organized much like a civilian college. The superintendent's principal duties include overseeing a civilian Academic Dean, who manages the academic program and faculty, and the Commandant of Midshipmen, who serves as dean of students and supervisor of all military and professional training. The superintendent, commandant, academic dean, and academic division directors sit on the academic board, which sets the academy's academic standards.

Traditionally, the role of Superintendent has been filled by an active-duty US Navy vice admiral. The first U.S. Marine officer appointed to the office, Lieutenant General Michael J. Borgschulte, assumed command in August 2025.

== List of Superintendents ==
No.	Image	Start	End	Name	Class year	Notability	References
1		3 September 1845	8 March 1847	Franklin Buchanan	—	Commanded the USS Susquehanna during the Perry Expedition. Became the only full admiral in the Confederate Navy during the American Civil War. He also commanded the ironclad CSS Virginia.	
2		15 March 1847	1 July 1850	George P. Upshur	—	Served in the USS Lexington, on the Brazil station, 1832–1834. He commanded the brig USS Truxtun on her first cruise in the Mediterranean in 1843–844.	
3		1 July 1850	1 November 1853	Cornelius K. Stribling	—	Served during the War of 1812, the Second Barbary War, the Mexican–American War, and the American Civil War.	
4		1 November 1853	15 September 1857	Louis M. Goldsborough	—	Served during the American Civil War, during which he held several sea commands during the Civil War, including that of the North Atlantic Blockading Squadron. He was also noted for contributions to nautical scientific research as the first commander of the Depot of Charts and Instruments.	
5	—	15 September 1857	9 September 1865	George S. Blake	—	Served in the West Indian Station and in the United States Coast Survey.	
6		9 September 1865	1 December 1869	David D. Porter	—	The second U.S. Navy officer to attain the rank of admiral. Served in the Mexican War in the attack on the fort at the City of Vera Cruz. Fought in the Civil War, including at the capture of New Orleans and Second Battle of Fort Fisher, and in the Vicksburg and Red River Campaigns	
7		1 December 1869	22 September 1874	John L. Worden	—	Commanded the USS Monitor in the Battle of Hampton Roads. Commanded the European Squadron from 1875 – 1877	
8		22 September 1874	1 July 1878	Christopher R. P. Rodgers	—	Served in the Mexican–American War, the Civil War, as President of the United States Naval Institute, and Commander-in-Chief of the Pacific Squadron.	
9		1 July 1878	2 August 1879	Foxhall A. Parker	—	Executive officer of the navy yard at Washington, D.C. During the Civil War, he worked to protect Alexandria, Virginia after the First Battle of Bull Run. Had charge of several gunboats, a battery at Fort Sumter, and later the Potomac Flotilla. A founder of the United States Naval Institute.	
10		2 August 1879	13 June 1881	George Balch	—	Commanded the Pawnee during the Civil War, Governor of the Philadelphia Naval Asylum, on the Light House Board, commander of the Pacific Squadron.	
11		13 June 1881	14 November 1881	Christopher R. P. Rodgers	—	Served in the Mexican–American War, the Civil War, as President of the United States Naval Institute, and Commander-in-Chief of the Pacific Squadron.	
12		14 November 1881	9 September 1886	Francis M. Ramsay	1856	Chief of the Navy Bureau of Navigation, Fleet Captain, South Atlantic Squadron, commanding officer of Guerriere, Ossipee, Lancaster, Boston, and Trenton and at Boston and New York as commandant of the Navy Yards.	
13		9 September 1886	13 June 1890	William Thomas Sampson	1861	Led the Flying Squadron to victory in the Battle of Santiago de Cuba during the Spanish–American War.	
14	—	13 June 1890	15 November 1894	Robert L. Phythian	1856	First superintendent of the New York Nautical School and later superintendent of the U.S. Naval Observatory.	
15		15 November 1894	15 July 1898	Philip H. Cooper	1863	Commander-in-Chief of the United States Asiatic Fleet, commander of the USS Swatara	
16		15 July 1898	15 March 1900	Frederick V. McNair	1857	Superintendent of the Naval Observatory (1890-1892), Commander of the Asiatic Station (1895-1897), Served on the Atlantic blockade stations and Mississippi River patrols during the Civil War.	
17		15 March 1900	6 November 1902	Richard Wainwright	1868	Fought in Spanish–American War, commanded American forces during the Santo Domingo Affair, commanded the Second Division of the Great White Fleet.	
18		6 November 1902	1 July 1905	Willard H. Brownson	1865	Commanded the USS Yankee during the Spanish–American War, Commander-in-Chief of the United States Asiatic Fleet, Chief of the Bureau of Navigation.	
19		1 July 1905	15 July 1907	James H. Sands	1863	Served as Governor of the Naval Home Squadron, president of the Naval Retirement Board, Commandant of the Philadelphia Navy Yard, commanded the Coast Squadron.	
20		15 July 1907	10 June 1909	Charles J. Badger	1873	Commander in Chief, Atlantic Fleet, commanded the USS Kansas, chairman of the General Board during World War I	
21	—	10 June 1909	15 May 1911	John M. Bowyer	1874	Commanded the USS Columbia, USS Illinois, and USS Connecticut	
22		15 May 1911	7 February 1914	John H. Gibbons	1879	Instructor at the Naval Academy, aide to the Assistant Secretary of the Navy, commanded the General Alava, Dolphin, Charleston, Louisiana, and Utah	
23		7 February 1914	20 September 1915	William F. Fullam	1877	Commanded the USS Chesapeake and the USS Mississippi, awarded the Navy Cross, commanded the Reserve Force, Pacific Fleet, and Patrol Force.	
24		20 September 1915	12 February 1919	Edward W. Eberle	1885	Third Chief of Naval Operations, commander of the Pacific Fleet, Naval Gun Factory, USS Washington and USS Pensacola	
25		12 February 1919	5 July 1921	Archibald H. Scales	1887	Served in the Spanish–American War, commanded the USS Severn, USS Columbia, the Bureau of Equipment, USS Hartford,	
26		5 July 1921	23 February 1925	Henry B. Wilson	1881	Commanded the USS Pennsylvania, Patrol Forces, Atlantic Fleet, U.S. Naval Forces, France, U.S. Atlantic Fleet and the U.S. Battle Fleet	
27		23 February 1925	16 June 1928	Louis M. Nulton	1889	Commanded landing parties ashore during the United States occupation of Veracruz, the Battle Fleet, and the USS Pennsylvania.	
28		16 June 1928	1 May 1931	Samuel S. Robison	1888	Founded a Naval Preparatory Academy in Pine Beach, New Jersey called Admiral Farragut Academy, commander of the United States Fleet.	
29		1 May 1931	18 June 1934	Thomas C. Hart	1897	Commanded USS Chicago, Submarine Division 2, Submarine Division 5, USS Mississippi, Submarine Flotilla 3, Cruiser Division 6, United States Asiatic Fleet and ABDAFLOAT	
30		18 June 1934	1 February 1938	David F. Sellers	1894	First person from New Mexico to graduate from the United States Naval Academy. Served in the Spanish–American War. Commanded the USS Stewart (DD-13), the cruisers Birmingham and Salem the battleship Wisconsin, and Agamemnon. Earned Navy Cross for service in World War I. Commanded the Maryland, the Special Service Squadron during the Nicaraguan Uprising, was Judge Advocate General of the Navy and Commander of the Battleships Battle Force, and the United States Fleet.	
31		1 February 1938	1 February 1941	Wilson Brown	1902	Vice admiral, served in World War I and World War II, commanded USS Parker, USS California, Groton Sub Base and Task Force 11. Naval aide to four presidents.	
32		1 February 1941	31 January 1942	Russell Willson	1906	Vice admiral, commanded Battleship Division 1. Inventor of the Navy Cipher Box. deputy commander in chief of the United States Fleet.	
33		31 January 1942	16 August 1945	John R. Beardall	1908	Rear admiral, naval aide to Franklin D. Roosevelt. Commanded the USS Vincennes.	
34		16 August 1945	15 January 1947	Aubrey W. Fitch	1906	Admiral, commanded USS Terry, USS Yankton, USS Luce, USS Mahan, USS Arctic, USS Wright, USS Langley, NAS Hampton Roads, USS Lexington, NAS PensacolaPatrol Wing 2, Carrier Division 1, Aircraft, South Pacific Force.	
35		15 January 1947	28 April 1950	James L. Holloway Jr.	1919	Admiral, Chief of Naval Personnel 1953–1957; commander in chief of all United States naval forces in the eastern Atlantic and Mediterranean from 1957 to 1959, commanded the 1958 American intervention in Lebanon. Key figure in establishment of the Naval Reserve Officer Training Corps.	
36		28 April 1950	4 August 1952	Harry W. Hill	1916	Admiral, commander of USS Dewey, Wichita, Battleship Division Four, and the Fifth Amphibious Force.	
37		4 August 1952	12 August 1954	C. Turner Joy	1921	Vice admiral, commanded the USS Litchfield, USS Louisville, a Naval Proving Ground and Naval Forces, Far East during the Korean War.	
38		12 August 1954	16 March 1956	Walter F. Boone	1921	Admiral, fought in World War II, commanded USS Yorktown (CV-10), U.S. Naval Forces, Eastern Atlantic and Mediterranean (1956–1958) and U.S. Military Representative, NATO Military Committee (1958–1960).	
39		16 March 1956	27 June 1958	William R. Smedberg III	1926	Vice admiral; commanded the USS Lansdowne, USS Hudson, USS Iowa, U.S. Second Fleet, the NATO Strike Fleet and chief of the Bureau of Naval Personnel	
40		27 June 1958	22 June 1960	Charles L. Melson	1927	Vice admiral; served in World War II, the Korean War, and the Cold War, commanded the United States First Fleet, United States Taiwan Defense Command and President of the Naval War College.	
41		22 June 1960	18 August 1962	John F. Davidson	1929	Commanded the submarines Mackerel and Blackfish during World War II. Later led the USS Albany, the Joint U.S. Military Mission for Aid to Turkey and the Pacific Fleet Training Command.	
42		18 August 1962	11 January 1964	Charles Cochran Kirkpatrick	1931	Rear admiral, commanded the submarine USS Triton during World War II and served as chief information officer of the Navy.	
43		11 January 1964	12 June 1965	Charles S. Minter Jr.	1937	Vice admiral; commanded the USS Albemarle; USS Intrepid, Fleet Air Wing, Pacific; Deputy Chief of Naval Operations (Logistics), and deputy chairman, NATO Military Committee.	
44		12 June 1965	22 June 1968	Draper L. Kauffman	1933	Rear admiral, organized the first Navy Demolition Teams, commanded U.S. Naval Forces in the Philippines and the 9th Naval District	
45	—	22 June 1968	20 July 1968	Lawrence Heyworth Jr.	1943	Rear admiral, executive officer of Fighter Squadron 61, finalist in selection of the Mercury Seven.	
46		20 July 1968	16 June 1972	James F. Calvert	1943	Vice admiral, commanded the USS Trigger, USS Skate, Cruiser Destroyer Flotilla Eight, and the First Fleet.	
47		16 June 1972	1 August 1975	William P. Mack	1937	Vice admiral, commanded the Seventh Fleet, author.	
48		1 August 1975	28 August 1978	Kinnaird R. McKee	1951	Admiral, led the Navy's Nuclear Power Program, commanded Submarine Group 8 during the Yom Kippur War.	
49		28 August 1978	22 August 1981	William P. Lawrence	1951	Vice admiral, commanded U.S. Third Fleet and Fighter Squadron 143. Was Chief of Naval Personnel.	
50		22 August 1981	31 August 1983	Edward C. Waller	1949	Vice admiral	
51		31 August 1983	19 August 1986	Charles R. Larson	1958	Admiral, led the United States Pacific Command. Served as the 51 and 55th superintendents.	
52		19 August 1986	18 August 1988	Ronald F. Marryott	1957	President and CEO of the George C. Marshall Foundation, president and CEO of the Naval Academy Alumni Association, and President of the Naval War College.	
53		18 August 1988	15 June 1991	Virgil L. Hill Jr.	1961	Rear admiral, president of Valley Forge Military Academy and College, led a $23 million fundraising push at the USNA.	
54		15 June 1991	1 August 1994	Thomas C. Lynch	1964	Rear admiral, Director of the Navy Staff at the Pentagon, reassigned after cheating scandal.	
55		1 August 1994	4 June 1998	Charles R. Larson	1958	Admiral, led the United States Pacific Command. Served as the 51 and 55th superintendents.	
56		4 June 1998	7 June 2002	John R. Ryan	1967	Vice admiral, commanded Patrol Wing 10, Patrol Squadron 31, and Patrol Squadron 11. Chancellor of the State University of New York.	
57		7 June 2002	5 June 2003	Richard J. Naughton	1968	Served in Gulf War, commanded Naval Strike and Air Warfare Center, NAS Fallon and Carrier Group FOUR/Carrier Striking Force.	
58		5 June 2003	1 August 2003	Charles W. Moore Jr.	1968	Vice admiral; commander of U.S. Naval Forces, Central Command, the Fifth Fleet in Bahrain, and Deputy Chief of Naval Operations, Fleet Readiness and Logistics.	.
59		1 August 2003	8 June 2007	Rodney P. Rempt	1966	Vice admiral; commander of USS Antelope, USS Callaghan, and USS Bunker Hill. President of the Naval War College.	
60		8 June 2007	3 August 2010	Jeffrey Fowler	1978	Commanded Charlotte (SSN-766), Submarine Squadron Three, Navy Recruiting Command, Submarine Group 8; and Task Forces 164/69.	
61		3 August 2010	23 July 2014	Michael H. Miller	1974	Commander USS John F. Kennedy (CV-67), USS Coronado (AGF-11), Carrier Strike Group Seven/Ronald Reagan Strike Group; directed White House Military Office.	
62		23 July 2014	26 July 2019	Walter E. Carter Jr.	1981	Vice admiral, 54th President of the U.S. Naval War College, commanded Carrier Strike Group Twelve and Joint Enabling Capabilities Command, USJFCOM.	
63		26 July 2019	27 August 2023	Sean Buck	1983	Vice admiral, chief of staff to the Director for Strategy, Plans, and Policy of the Joint Chiefs of Staff and led the U.S. Naval Forces Southern Command/U.S. 4th Fleet.	
64		27 August 2023	11 January 2024	Fred Kacher	1990	Rear admiral, former vice director for operations of the Joint Chiefs of Staff; Acting Superintendent due to delay in confirmation of successor.	
65		11 January 2024	15 August 2025	Yvette M. Davids	1989	Vice admiral, commanded Naval Surface Forces and Carrier Strike Group 11. First female officer to hold the position.	
66		15 August 2025	Incumbent	Michael J. Borgschulte	1991	Lieutenant General, first Marine officer to hold the position.	

A "—" in the class year column indicates a superintendent who is not an alumnus of the academy.

== See also ==
- United States Naval Academy Cemetery § Superintendents of USNA
- Superintendents of the United States Military Academy
- Superintendent of the United States Air Force Academy

== Bibliography ==
- Benjamin, Park (1900). The United States Naval Academy: Being the Yarn of the American Midshipman (naval Cadet) ... G. P. Putnam's sons.
- Hamersly, Lewis Randolph (1898). The Records of Living Officers of the U.S. Navy and Marine Corps. L. R. Hamersly & Company.
- Hatch, Alden (1943). Heroes of Annapolis. Internet Archive. New York J. Messner.
- Todorich, Charles (1984). The Spirited Years: A History of the Antebellum Naval Academy. Naval Institute Press. ISBN 9780870215209.
