= Kinnaird R. McKee =

United States admiral

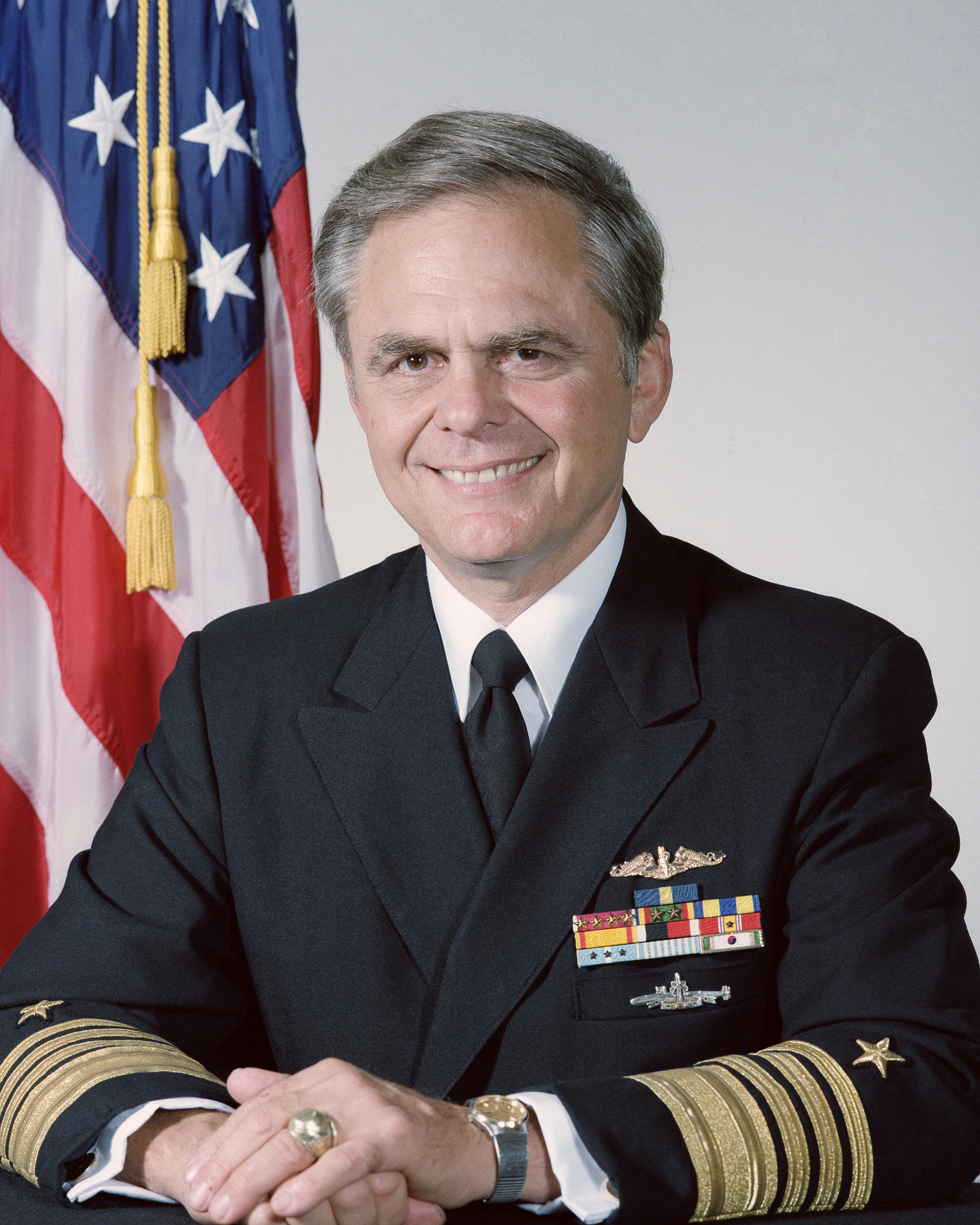
- Adm. Kinnaird R. McKee in 1985
- Born: August 14, 1929; Louisville, Kentucky, U.S.
- Died: December 30, 2013 (aged 84); Annapolis, Maryland, U.S.
- Military career
- Branch: United States Navy
- Service years: 1951–1988
- Rank: Admiral
- Commands: Director, Naval Nuclear Propulsion; US Third Fleet
- Conflicts: Korean War
- Awards: Navy Distinguished Service Medal; Legion of Merit (5)

Kinnaird Rowe McKee (August 14, 1929 – December 30, 2013) was an American United States Navy four star admiral who served as Director, Naval Nuclear Propulsion from 1982 to 1988. He also served as Superintendent, United States Naval Academy from 1975 to 1978.

McKee was born in Louisville, Kentucky on August 14, 1929, and graduated from the United States Naval Academy in 1951. He served in the Pacific fleet destroyer USS Marshall (DD-676) during the Korean War and in eight submarines of the Atlantic fleet since that time. After completion of submarine training in 1953, he served in three diesel-powered submarines: USS Picuda (SS-382), USS Sea Cat (SS-399), and USS Marlin (SST-2). In 1956, Admiral McKee was ordered to command of USS X-1, a small experimental submarine. He graduated from nuclear power training in 1958 and joined the commissioning crew of USS Skipjack (SSN-585), the Navy's first high performance nuclear-powered attack submarine. Assignment as Executive Officer of USS Nautilus (SSN-571) followed in 1961, then of the USS Sam Houston (SSBN-609) in late 1962. After three deterrent patrols on the SAM HOUSTON, he served in the Naval Reactors Division of the Atomic Energy Commission from 1964 to 1966. Admiral McKee served as Commanding Officer of the nuclear-powered attack submarine USS Dace (SSN-607) from 1966 through 1969. In 1967, he documented the second nuclear accident of the Soviet icebreaker Lenin. A year later in 1968, during a patrol in the Barent Sea, he was able to take the first pictures of the new Soviet Victor-Class and Charlie-Class Submarines as well as collecting their sound signatures. The circumstances surrounding his accomplishments earned McKee the career-advancing reputation of an icon in the Submarine Fleet. During the period of his command, USS Dace was twice awarded the Navy Unit Commendation and three times the Battle Efficiency Pennant.

Following command of Dace, Admiral McKee served in the office of the Director, Navy Program Planning, where his responsibilities included strategic warfare, research and development, and submarine and anti-submarine warfare systems. In 1970, he was assigned to the immediate staff of the chief of naval operations, where he established the CNO Executive Panel. As Commander, Submarine Group Eight, Admiral McKee served as the NATO and U.S. submarine commander in the Mediterranean from 1973 to 1975. On August 1, 1975, he became the forty-eighth Superintendent of the U.S. Naval Academy. Promoted to three-star rank in March 1978, Admiral McKee served as Commander, Third Fleet with headquarters in Pearl Harbor. From there he was assigned as Director, Naval Warfare, Office of the Chief of Naval Operations concurrent with the expansion of the directorate from its original concentration on anti-submarine warfare to responsibility for all aspects of naval warfare. He developed and implemented the new organization.

On February 1, 1982, he relieved Admiral Hyman G. Rickover as the Director, Naval Nuclear Propulsion. On March 2, 1982, he was confirmed by the U.S. Senate for promotion to four-star rank. Admiral McKee retired on October 31, 1988, after 41 years of service to his country. Admiral McKee's decorations include the Distinguished Service Medal, five awards of the Legion of Merit, and three awards of the Navy Unit Commendation.

He died after a long illness on December 30, 2013.

== Awards and decorations ==

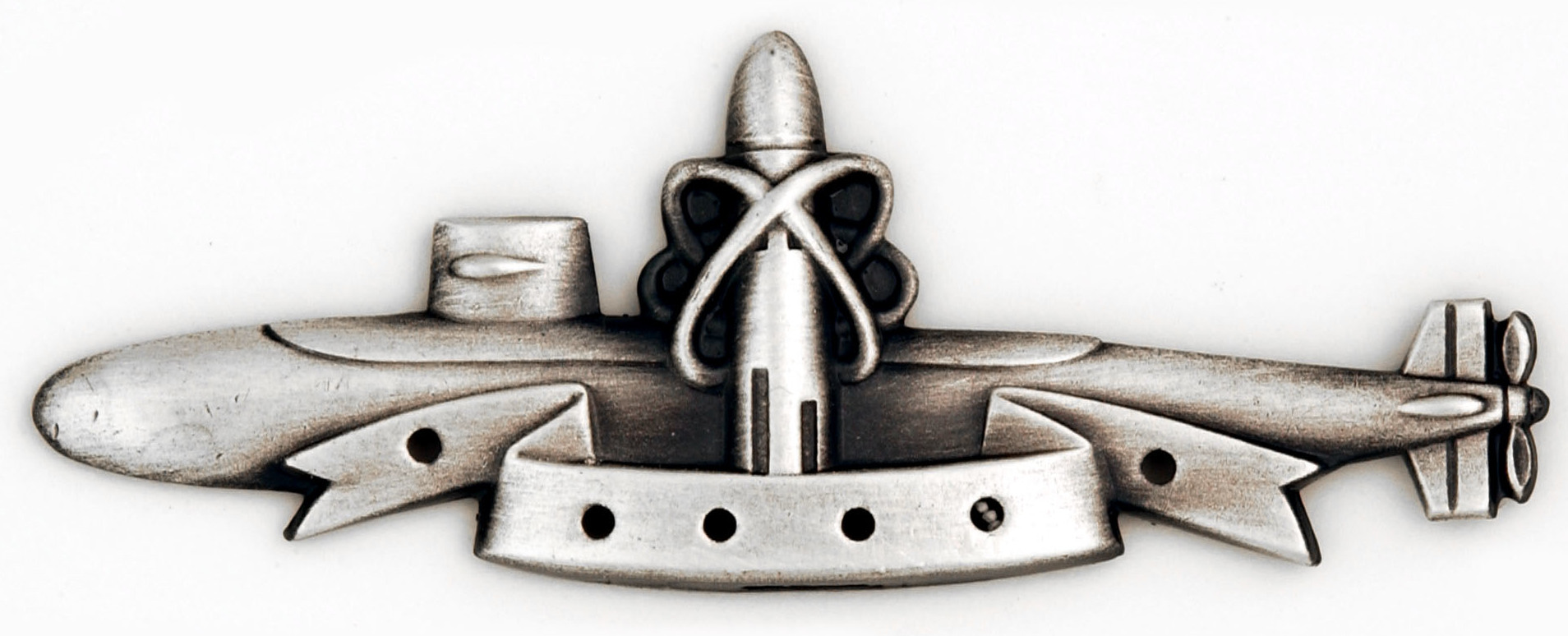

Submarine Warfare Officer badge
Navy Distinguished Service Medal / Legion of Merit with four gold award stars
Navy Unit Commendation with two service stars	Navy Expeditionary Medal	China Service Medal
Army of Occupation Medal	National Defense Service Medal with one campaign star	Korean Service Medal with 3 campaign stars
United Nations Korea Medal	ROK War Service Medal	ROK Presidential Unit Citation
SSBN Deterrent Patrol Insignia with two patrol stars

Academic offices
Preceded by William P. Mack	Superintendent of United States Naval Academy; 1975-1978	Succeeded by William P. Lawrence
