= Borgschulte =

Borgschulte is a surname. Notable people with the surname include:

- Matt Borgschulte (born 1990), American baseball player and coach
- Michael Borgschulte (born 1969), American military officer
