= Admiral Davidson =

Admiral Davidson may refer to:

- Glenn V. Davidson (born 1952), Royal Canadian Navy vice admiral
- John F. Davidson (1908–1989), U.S. Navy rear admiral
- Lyal A. Davidson (1886–1950), U.S. Navy vice admiral
- Philip S. Davidson (born 1960), U.S. Navy admiral
- Tina A. Davidson (born 1960), U.S. Navy rear admiral
