= Charles L. Melson =

United States Navy vice admiral

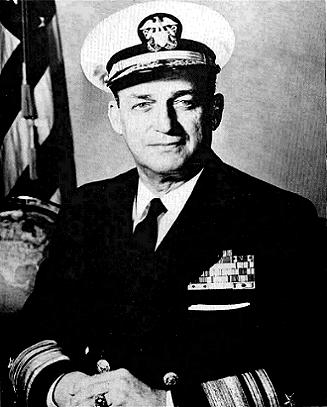
- Born: May 25, 1904; Richmond, Virginia, US
- Died: September 14, 1981 (aged 77); Fort Lauderdale, Florida, US
- Burial place: United States Naval Academy Cemetery, Annapolis, Maryland
- Military career
- Allegiance: United States of America
- Branch: United States Navy
- Service years: 1927–1966
- Rank: Vice Admiral
- Commands: USS Champlin (DD-601); Destroyer Division 32; Destroyer Squadron 20; USS New Jersey (BB-62); Task Force 70.1; Superintendent of the United States Naval Academy; Cruiser Division 4; United States First Fleet; United States Taiwan Defense Command; President of the Naval War College
- Conflicts: World War II; Battle of the Atlantic; Operation Husky; Operation Shingle; Operation Dragoon; Korean War; Cold War
- Awards: Distinguished Service Medal; Silver Star; Legion of Merit (three awards); American Defense Service Medal (with Atlantic Device); American Campaign Medal; European-African-Middle Eastern Campaign Medal (five awards); World War II Victory Medal; Navy Occupation Service Medal; National Defense Service Medal (two awards); Korean Service Medal (three awards); Republic of Korea Presidential Unit Citation; United Nations Service Medal for Korea

Charles Leroy Melson (25 May 1904 – 14 September 1981) was a vice admiral of the United States Navy. His career included service in World War II, the Korean War, and the Cold War, command of the United States First Fleet and of the United States Taiwan Defense Command, and tours of duty as Superintendent of the United States Naval Academy and President of the Naval War College.

== Early life ==
Melson was born in Richmond, Virginia, on 25 May 1904. He was appointed from Virginia to the United States Naval Academy in Annapolis, Maryland, and was admitted to the school on 6 July 1923. He graduated and was commissioned as an ensign on 2 June 1927.

== Naval career ==
=== Early career ===
On 26 August 1927, Melson began his first tour, reporting aboard the light cruiser USS Trenton (CL-11) in the Scouting Fleet. By the beginning of 1930, he was serving aboard the destroyer USS McCormick (DD-223) in the United States Asiatic Fleet, and he was promoted to lieutenant (junior grade) on 2 June 1930. By the beginning of 1932, he was serving aboard the destroyer USS Du Pont (DD-152). He had transferred to the destroyer USS Dickerson (DD-157) by the beginning of 1933, and by the beginning of 1934 he was serving aboard the heavy cruiser USS Northampton (CA-26), operating in the Pacific Ocean.

Detaching from Northampton in April 1934, Melson reported to the Naval Postgraduate School, then located in Annapolis, Maryland, on 1 June 1934 to earn a graduate degree in naval engineering. Completing his degree, he returned to sea, beginning a tour aboard the battleship USS Pennsylvania (BB-38) in June 1936, and he was promoted to lieutenant on 30 June 1936. Leaving Pennsylvania in June 1937, he reported for duty in connection with the fitting out of the new destroyer USS Patterson (DD-392) at the Puget Sound Navy Yard in Bremerton, Washington, and then began a tour aboard Patterson upon her commissioning on 22 September 1937. Detaching from Patterson in May 1940, Melson reported to the Office of the Chief of Naval Operations in Washington, D.C., on 3 June 1940 for his next tour. He received a promotion to lieutenant commander on 1 August 1941.

=== World War II ===
The United States entered World War II on 7 December 1941, and in March 1942 Melson was assigned to the staff of the Commander-in-Chief, United States Fleet, where he served as assistant operations officer. In November 1942 he took command of the destroyer USS Champlin (DD-601). While in command of Champlin he engaged in an action for which he would eventually be awarded a Gold Star in lieu of a second award of the Legion of Merit and was authorized to wear the Combat "V" for, according to the award citation:

...exceptionally meritorious conduct in the performance of outstanding services to the Government of the United States in action against an enemy submarine on 12 and 13 March 1943, as Commanding Officer of the U.S.S. CHAMPLIN (DD-601). While escorting a convoy of merchant ships from the United States to Mediterranean ports, the CHAMPLIN made contact with an enemy submarine shortly after dark on 12 March 1943. Captain Melson led his ship in persistent and vigorous attacks by gunfire and depth charges throughout the night of 12 and 13 March with the result that the enemy submarine was sunk without inflicting any damage on friendly ships. Captain Melson's bold action and skillful handling of his ship during this action, plus his vigorous direction and training of the personnel under his command, were directly responsible for the ultimate success attained in the destruction of an enemy submarine.

The submarine was the German U-130, sunk in the North Atlantic Ocean at 37°10′N 20°21′W.

Melson commanded Champlin in the Mediterranean Sea during Operation Husky, the Allied amphibious invasion of Sicily in July–August 1943. In March 1944, he became the commanding officer of Destroyer Division 32, which he commanded during the latter portions of Operation Shingle, the Allied invasion of Anzio, Italy. For his actions at Anzio, he received his first award of the Legion of Merit, the citation reading in part that Melson was:

...in action against enemy forces during advanced operations in support of the Allied Armies in Italy, from 15 May to 5 August 1944. Skillfully directing the operations of his ship from the time of the breakthrough to the Anzio Beachhead and continuing through the coastal advance northward, Captain Melson directed successful shore bombardments against enemy concentrations and installations; protected Allied coastal shipping lanes against enemy submarine and surface attacks; and supported advance minesweeping formations engaged in clearing heavily mined approaches to ports occupied by our forces despite repeated hostile aerial attacks. By his leadership, initiative and devotion to duty throughout, Captain Melson rendered invaluable assistance to the Allied armies in overcoming enemy resistance in their advance into northern Italy...

Melson continued in command of Destroyer Division 32 for Operation Dragoon, the Allied invasion of southern France in August 1944. He received the Silver Star for his performance from 18 to 30 August 1944 during the invasion, the citation reading:

By skillfully maneuvering his ship, and accurately directing their gunfire, Captain Melson provided effective support for the advancing ground forces in clearing the enemy from coastal positions on the right flank of the central assault area. Braving strong return fire, he conducted the shore bombardment with competence and vigor, silenced several enemy shore batteries, saturated enemy troop and tank concentrations and harassed the interior supply lines. His able participation in this action materially assisted in the expulsion of the enemy from Southern France...

In November 1944, Melson moved to the staff of Commander, Destroyers, United States Atlantic Fleet, where he was the operations officer and assistant chief of staff. Other duties included chief of staff to Commander, Battleship Division Five, and operations and plans officer to the United States Sixteenth Fleet. He was advanced to the temporary rank of captain on 20 March 1945.

=== Post-World War II ===
After World War II, Melson was at the Naval War College in Newport, Rhode Island, first taking the Senior Course — completing a year of studies in 1948 — and then remaining at the college for another year as an instructor. After the referral on 23 May 1949 to the United States Senate of President Harry S. Truman′s approval of Melson′s promotion to the permanent rank of captain, the Senate confirmed and reported that promotion on 2 June 1949, with Melson′s date of rank backdated to 20 March 1945.

Leaving the Naval War College, Melson returned to sea as the commander of Destroyer Squadron 20, then served as administrative aid to the Superintendent of the U.S. Naval Academy. During the Korean War, he was the commanding officer of the flagship of the United States Seventh Fleet, the battleship USS New Jersey (BB-62), from 20 October 1952, serving also as Commander, Task Group 70.1. He remained in command of New Jersey through the end of the war in July 1953 and until 24 October 1953. He received a second Gold Star in lieu of a third award of the Legion of Merit for his tour aboard New Jersey, the citation saying that:

...during operations against enemy aggressor forces in Korea from 8 April to 27 July 1953. Throughout this period, Captain Melson discharged his many responsibilities with exceptional professional skill and leadership and effectively directed the gunfire of his vessel and the Task Group under his command during repeated shore bombardment missions against enemy installations along both coasts of Korea, inflicting widespread damage and destruction on supply lines, shore batteries, industrial centers, and troop concentrations. During the months of June and July when the tempo of fighting increased along the main line of resistance, he skillfully maneuvered NEW JERSEY to lend close gun support to the friendly forces on the eastern terminus of the front lines which prohibited the enemy from launching successful attacks. By his expert seamanship, resourcefulness and unwavering devotion to duty, Captain Melson contributed immeasurably to the success of friendly forces in Korea...

On 1 June 1955, Melson was promoted to rear admiral and became deputy chief of staff for the commander of the Atlantic Fleet. After that, Melson commanded Cruiser Division 4 until April 1958.

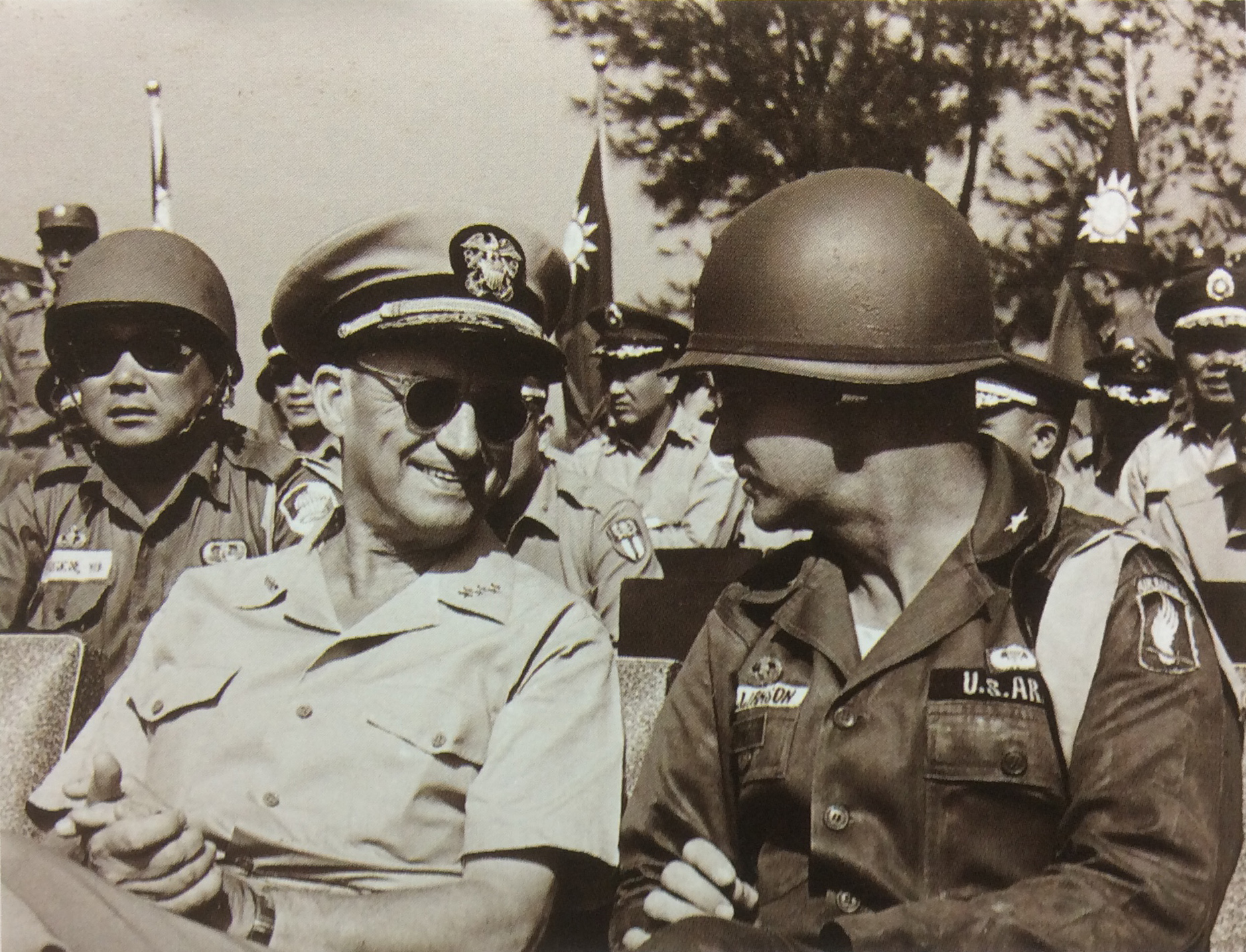
VADM Charles L. Melson (left), then Commander of the United States Taiwan Defense Command, talked with Brig. Gen. Ellis W. Williamson (right) during an airborne military exercise in Taiwan, 1963.

Melson was Superintendent of the United States Naval Academy from 27 June 1958 to 22 June 1960. He was commander of the United States First Fleet from 14 July 1960 to 12 April 1962, He then served a two-year tour as commander of the United States Taiwan Defense Command, leaving that post on 6 July 1964.

On 31 July 1964, Melson became the 33rd President of the Naval War College. He served as president until 25 January 1966. During his presidency, he supported a greater emphasis on basic naval subjects, expanded the use of the Naval Electronic Warfare Simulator (NEWS) in the college's wargaming center, and oversaw the construction of an addition to Mahan Hall for an expanded library collection. He received the Distinguished Service Medal for his war college tour, the citation saying:

Dedicated to maintaining the academic reputation and prestige of the Navy's highest educational institution, Vice Admiral Melson conducted several studies and made a number of significant representations to his superiors in the Navy Department which resulted in a re-definition of the mission and functions of the Naval War College; notable improvements in the curricula of the resident schools, academic planning procedures, educational methods, student research, and the structure and quality of the faculty; clarification and re-direction of planning for facilities development; and promotion of an overall Navy policy on professional education. At his urgent suggestion, a Committee of Advisors on the Naval War College has been appointed to conduct an annual objective examination of the College programs.

Melson retired from the Navy in 1966 upon the conclusion of his college presidency. He worked for the Central Intelligence Agency for a year before retiring for a second time.

== Personal life ==
Melson was married to the former Vedah Lee Jenkins (1900–1980) and had a daughter, Nancy Melson McHugh, and two stepsons.

== Death ==
Melson died in Fort Lauderdale, Florida, on 14 September 1981. He is buried with his wife at the United States Naval Academy Cemetery in Annapolis, Maryland.

== Awards ==
Melson′s personal awards and decorations include:

- Distinguished Service Medal
- Silver Star Medal
- Legion of Merit (three awards)
- American Defense Service Medal (with Atlantic Device)
- American Campaign Medal
- European-African-Middle Eastern Campaign Medal (five awards)
- World War II Victory Medal
- Navy Occupation Service Medal
- National Defense Service Medal (two awards)
- Korean Service Medal (three awards)
- Republic of Korea Presidential Unit Citation
- United Nations Service Medal for Korea

== Notes ==
Military offices
Preceded by William R. Smedberg III	Superintendent of United States Naval Academy; 27 June 1958–22 June 1960	Succeeded by John F. Davidson
Preceded by Bernard L. Austin	President of the Naval War College; 31 July 1964–25 January 1966	Succeeded by John T. Hayward
