= Draper Kauffman =

United States admiral and underwater demolition expert (1911–1978)

Draper Laurence Kauffman
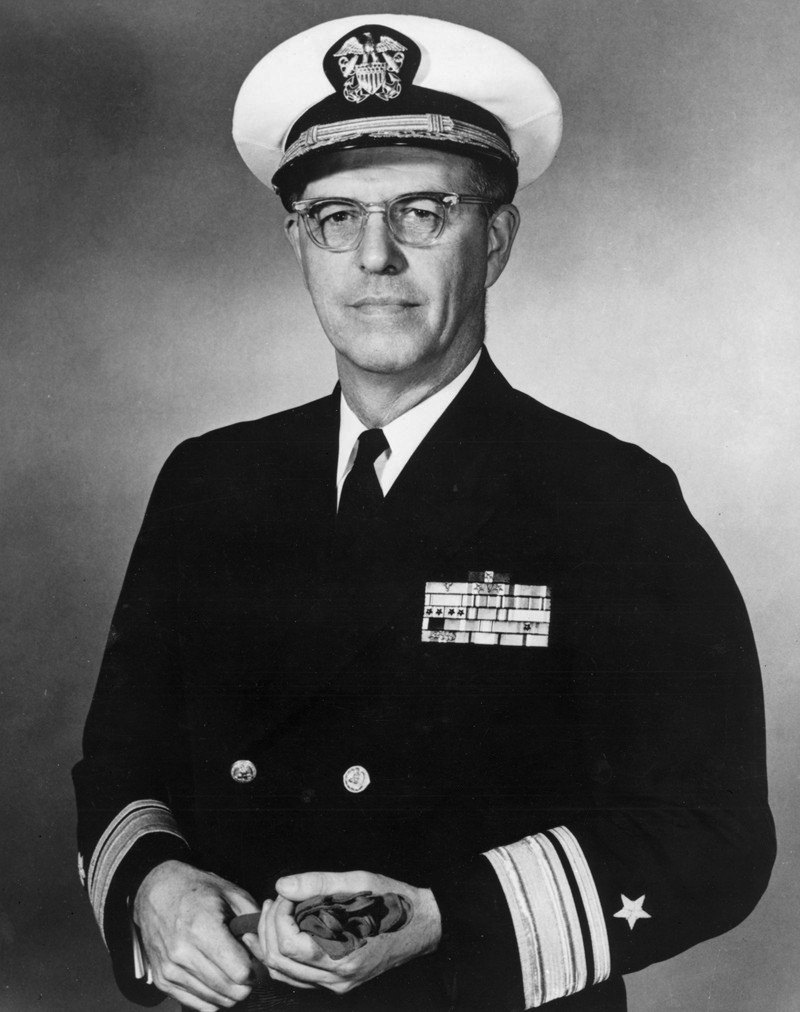
- Born: 4 August 1911; San Diego, California, U.S.
- Died: 18 August 1979 (aged 68); Budapest, Hungary
- Burial place: United States Naval Academy Cemetery
- Relatives: Vice Admiral James L. Kauffman (father)
- Military career
- Allegiance: United Kingdom; United States
- Branch: Royal Naval Volunteer Reserve (1940–41); United States Navy (1941–73)
- Service years: 1941–1973
- Rank: Rear Admiral
- Commands: 9th Naval District; U.S. Naval Forces in the Philippines; United States Naval Academy; Destroyer Flotilla Three; USS Helena (CA-75); USS Bexar (APA-237); Destroyer Division 122; USS Gearing (DD-710); Underwater Demolition Team 5 Naval Combat Demolition Unit
- Conflicts: World War II; Mariana and Palau Islands campaign; Battle of Saipan; Battle of Tinian; Volcano and Ryukyu Islands campaign; Battle of Iwo Jima; Battle of Okinawa
- Awards: Navy Cross (2); Navy Distinguished Service Medal (2); Legion of Merit

Rear Admiral Draper Laurence Kauffman (4 August 1911 – 18 August 1979) was an American underwater demolition expert, who served during the 1960s as 44th Superintendent of the United States Naval Academy. During World War II, he organized the first U.S. Navy Combat Demolition Units from which the SEALs and Navy Explosive Ordnance Disposal (EOD) would evolve. His wartime service also included participation in the invasions of Saipan, Tinian, Iwo Jima, and Okinawa.

== Childhood and education ==
Draper L. Kauffman, the son of Vice Admiral James L. Kauffman, was born in San Diego, California, on 4 August 1911. He attended St. Albans School in Washington, D.C., and Kent School in Kent, Connecticut and was appointed to the United States Naval Academy from Ohio in 1929.

Kauffman graduated from the U.S. Naval Academy in 1933, but poor eyesight denied him a commission in the regular navy.

== World War II ==
=== Volunteer service in Europe, 1940–1941 ===
Employed by the United States Lines Steamship Company, his travels in Europe alerted him to the danger of Nazi Germany. In February 1940, he joined the American Volunteer Ambulance Corps in France. On 16 June, he was captured by the Germans and held prisoner for two months.

Released in August, he made his way to England and was commissioned a sub-lieutenant in the British Royal Navy Volunteer Reserve, later rising to lieutenant. At the height of the Blitz on London (1940–1941), he served as a bomb and mine disposal officer, and achieved a high degree of proficiency in bomb disposal techniques.

=== U.S. Navy service, 1941–1945 ===
Securing a U.S. Naval Reserve commission a month before Pearl Harbor, Kauffman was rushed to Hawaii after the Japanese attack, and there disarmed an enemy bomb, the first to be recovered intact for study. For this action, the Navy awarded him a Navy Cross.

In January 1942, he was assigned the task of organizing a U.S. Naval Bomb Disposal School at the Washington Navy Yard. This school is one of the forefathers to the Explosive Ordnance Disposal School (NAVSCOLEOD) at the Kauffman Training Facility at Eglin Air Force Base, Florida, which is managed by the Navy and staffed by all services to train the Department of Defense EOD technicians. As an additional duty he assisted the U.S. Army in setting up a comparable school at Aberdeen, Maryland.

In June 1943, he organized the first U.S. Navy Combat Demolition Units (NCDUs). They were incorporated into the Underwater Demolition Teams, forerunners of the SEALs. Lt. Commander Kauffman was the first commanding officer of the Naval Combat Demolition Unit, Naval Amphibious Training Base, Fort Pierce, Florida. While there, he also organized and was the first chairman of the Joint Army-Navy Experimental and Testing Board (JANET).

In April 1944, he was ordered to the Pacific Fleet and served at; the Naval Combat Demolition Training and Experimental Base, Maui, Hawaii; first as the commanding officer of Underwater Demolition Team 5 (UDT 5); then as senior staff officer, Underwater Demolition Teams, Amphibious Forces, Pacific Fleet; and as Underwater Demolition Training Officer, Amphibious Training Command, Pacific Fleet.

As commander of UDT 5, he participated in the invasion of Saipan, and received a second Navy Cross for leading his team on a daylight reconnaissance of hostile beaches under heavy fire, and on 10 July 1944, leading a night reconnaissance of hostile beaches on Tinian island. At Iwo Jima and Okinawa he was the Commander Underwater Demolition Teams. Twice he had to transfer command from a damaged ship to another to carry on operations. At Iwo Jima in 1945, following a hit from an aerial attack on his vessel, he directed fire control efforts despite exploding munitions.

== Cold War naval career ==
His first postwar assignment came in February 1946 when he was assigned to Joint Task Force One, the organization which conducted "Operation Crossroads", the atomic bomb tests at Bikini Atoll. Later under the CNO, as head of the Defense and Protection Section, he established the U.S. Navy Radiological Safety School, and aided in setting up a comparable school for the Army.

From October to December 1947, he was assigned to the carrier Valley Forge (CV-45) and was aboard her during her round-the-world cruise in 1948. Following a month's instruction at the Fleet Sonar School in Key West, Florida, he commanded the destroyer Gearing (DD-710) from December 1948 until July 1950, when he entered the Naval War College in Newport, Rhode Island. Upon completion of the logistics course in June 1951, he remained for two years as a member of the Strategy and Tactics Staff.

In June 1953, he assumed command of Destroyer Division 122. In 1954, Kauffman served in the Strategic Plans Division under the CNO, and in 1955 was appointed Aide to the Under Secretary of the Navy and later Secretary of the Navy, Thomas S. Gates, Jr.

In August 1957, he assumed command of the attack transport Bexar (APA-237) which he commanded until August 1958 when he was ordered to duty as Assistant Chief of Staff for Plans on the staff of the Commander in Chief, U.S. Pacific Fleet. In January 1960, he commanded the heavy cruiser Helena (CA-75).

In July 1960, Kauffman was selected as Rear Admiral, and he became Commander Destroyer Flotilla Three (later redesignated Cruiser Destroyer Flotilla Three). In 1962, he became Chief of the Strategic Plans and Policy Division.

In 1965, he became the 44th Superintendent of the U.S. Naval Academy, where he served for three years. His next assignment was as the Commander of the U.S. Naval Forces in the Philippines, and Representative of the Commander-in-Chief, Pacific, a billet once filled 25 years earlier by his father.

In June 1970, he became commandant of the 9th Naval District, headquartered at Great Lakes Naval Station, Illinois, with an additional duty as Commander of the Station.

Rear Admiral Kauffman retired from the Navy on 1 June 1973 and became the 9th president of Marion Military Institute from 1974 to 1976. He died on 18 August 1979, Budapest, Hungary, while on a tour with members of a Naval Academy alumni group.

=== Military awards and decorations ===
Military decorations and awards include the following according to the medals and ribbonrack at the National Navy UDT-SEAL Museum in Florida.

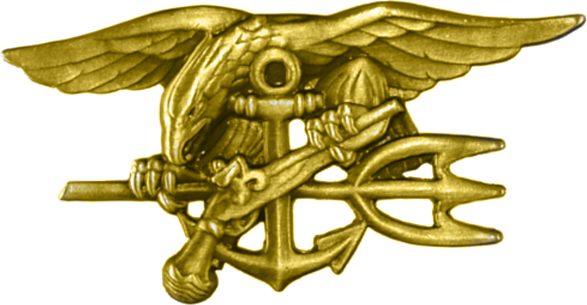

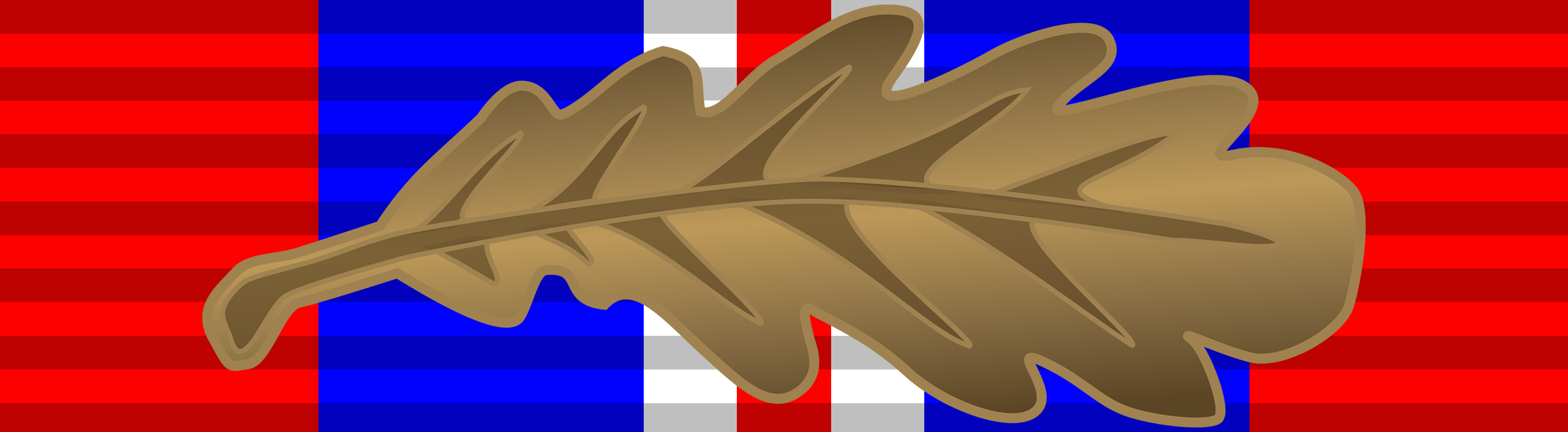

Special Warfare insignia
1st Row	Navy Cross w/ one 3/16" Gold Stars		
2nd Row	Navy Distinguished Service Medal w/ one 3/16" Gold Stars	Legion of Merit w/ Combat "V"	Joint Service Commendation Medal
3rd Row	Navy Commendation Medal w/ Combat "V" and two 3/16" Gold Stars	Navy Unit Commendation	American Defense Service Medal
4th Row	American Campaign Medal	Asiatic–Pacific Campaign Medal w/ four 3/16" bronze star	European–African–Middle Eastern Campaign Medal
5th Row	World War II Victory Medal	China Service Medal	Navy Occupation Service Medal
6th Row	National Defense Service Medal w/ one 3/16" bronze star	Croix de Guerre w/ one 3/16" bronze star	War Medal 1939–1945 with palm
7th Row	Defence Medal (United Kingdom)	Philippine Legion of Honor Commander	Philippine Liberation Medal

== Legacy ==
The Oliver Hazard Perry-class frigate Kauffman (FFG-59), launched in 1987, was named in honor of Draper Kauffman and his father, Vice Admiral James L. Kauffman (1887–1963). His roles as the founder of U.S. Naval Bomb Disposal and as the creator of hell week for the UDT/SEALs were honored with the creation of the Kauffman EOD Training Complex at Eglin AFB, Florida, and the Draper L. Kauffman Naval Special Warfare Operations Facility in Norfolk, Virginia.

Taren Stinebrickner-Kauffman, founder of SumOfUs, is a granddaughter.

== See also ==
- List of superintendents of the United States Naval Academy

Academic offices
Preceded by C.S. Minter Jr.	Superintendent of United States Naval Academy; 1968	Succeeded by Lawrence Heyworth Jr.
