= Henry Braid Wilson =

United States Navy admiral (1861–1954)

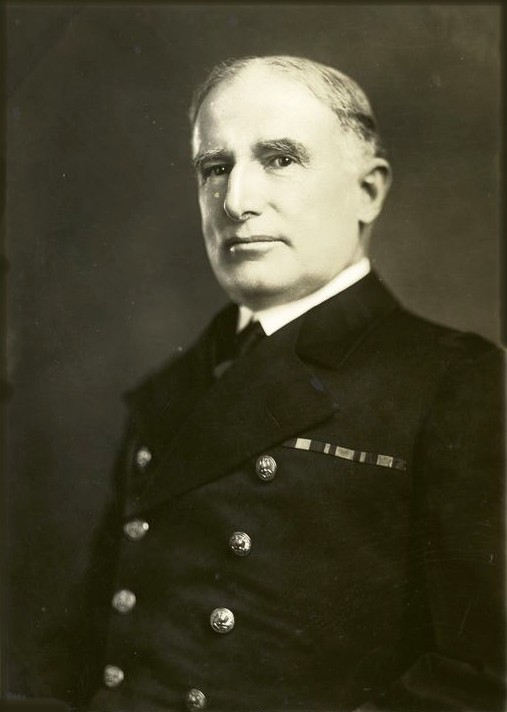
- Henry Braid Wilson
- Born: 23 February 1861; Camden, New Jersey, US
- Died: 30 January 1954 (aged 92); New York City, US
- Relatives: MG Patrick J. Hurley, son-in-law
- Military career
- Allegiance: United States of America
- Branch: United States Navy
- Service years: 1881–1925
- Rank: Admiral
- Commands: USS North Dakota (BB-29); Board of Inspection and Survey; USS Pennsylvania (BB-38); Patrol Forces, Atlantic Fleet; U.S. Naval Forces, France; U.S. Atlantic Fleet; U.S. Battle Fleet; United States Naval Academy
- Conflicts: Spanish–American War; World War I
- Awards: Navy Distinguished Service Medal; Distinguished Service Medal (U.S. Army); World War I Victory Medal

Henry Braid Wilson, Jr. (23 February 1861 – 30 January 1954) was an admiral in the United States Navy during World War I.

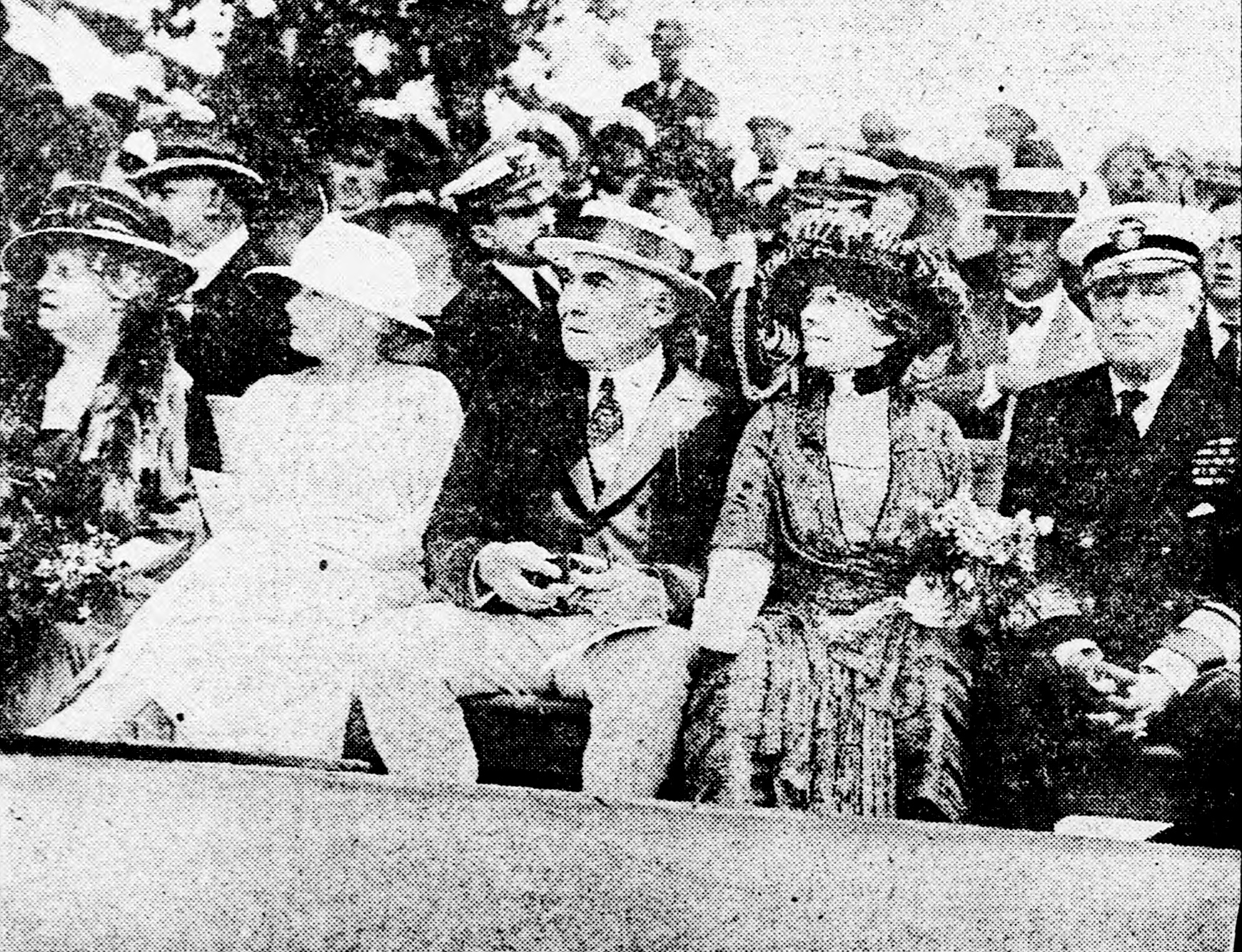
Henry Braid Wilson (far right) with Warren G. Harding (center), 1922

== Biography ==
Wilson was a native of Camden, New Jersey. He joined the United States Navy in the latter part of the nineteenth century and continued to serve for over forty years. He graduated from the U.S. Naval Academy in 1881, His assignments included duties as commanding officer of the USS North Dakota, inspector, senior inspector and president of the Board of Inspection and Survey from November 1913 until May 1916, and commanding officer of the USS Pennsylvania in 1916.

During World War I, he served as commander, Patrol Forces, Atlantic Fleet and then commander, U.S. Naval Forces, France. After the World War he served as Commander-In-Chief of the Atlantic Fleet 1919–1921, Commander-In-Chief of the U.S. Battle Fleet and later superintendent of the U.S. Naval Academy 1921–1925. Two notable students of his at the academy were cadets and future Admiral Hyman G. Rickover, class of 1922, and Admiral Arleigh A. Burke, class of 1923. Wilson retired in 1925, following forty-four years of service.

Wilson died in 1954 in New York City; at the time of his death he was the oldest living admiral of the U.S. Navy. He was buried at Arlington National Cemetery.

Wilson's son-in-law was Hoover Administration Secretary of War and Major General Patrick J. Hurley.

== Medals and commendations ==
Navy Distinguished Service Medal
Army Distinguished Service Medal
Sampson Medal
Spanish Campaign Medal
China Relief Expedition Medal
Philippine Campaign Medal
World War I Victory Medal with "Overseas" clasp

== Namesake and honors ==
- USS Henry B. Wilson (DDG-7), a guided missile destroyer, was named for him.
- A portion of U.S. Route 30 in New Jersey passing through Camden, New Jersey is named Admiral Wilson Boulevard.

Academic offices
Preceded by Archibald H. Scales	Superintendent of United States Naval Academy; 1921–1925	Succeeded by Louis M. Nulton
Military offices
Preceded by Henry T. Mayo	Commander in Chief, United States Atlantic Fleet; July, 1919–June, 1921	Succeeded by Hilary P. Jones
