= Charles Cochran Kirkpatrick =

United States Navy officer

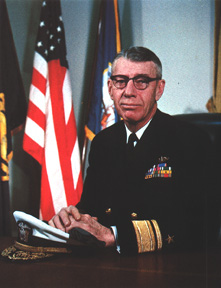
- Born: June 20, 1907; San Angelo, Texas, US
- Died: March 12, 1988 (aged 80); Kerrville, Texas, US
- Spouse: Lalla Branch Kirkpatrick
- Military career
- Allegiance: United States
- Branch: United States Navy
- Service years: 1926–1964
- Rank: Rear admiral
- Commands: Superintendent of the United States Naval Academy, others below
- Awards: Navy Cross (3)

Charles Cochran Kirkpatrick (June 20, 1907 – March 12, 1988) was a rear admiral in the United States Navy who was Superintendent of the United States Naval Academy in Annapolis, Maryland, from August 18, 1962, to January 11, 1964. He also held commands of Chief of Staff, U.S. Taiwan Defense Command from 1956 to 1957, Chief of Information for the United States Navy from 1957 to 1960, and Commander Training Command, U.S. Pacific Fleet from 1961 to 1962). Kirkpatrick was due for promotion to vice admiral in 1964, but a heart attack forced him into retirement.

The Admiral, with Walt Disney and Chief Stuart Nelson and his family, Dedicated the new submarine ride at Disneyland in 1959. Chief Nelson's wife christened Disney's Nautilus. Then Disney, the Admiral and Chief Steward Nelson and his family sailed the maiden voyage.

Kirkpatrick died in 1988 in Kerrville, Texas.

Academic offices
Preceded by John F. Davidson	Superintendent of United States Naval Academy; 1962–1964	Succeeded by Charles S. Minter Jr.
