= Archibald Scales =

United States Navy admiral

Archibald H. Scales
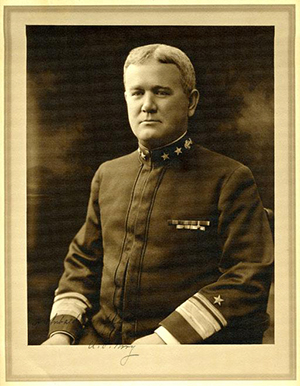
- Born: April 14, 1868; Greensboro, North Carolina, U.S.
- Died: February 16, 1952 (aged 83); Bethesda, Maryland, U.S.
- Military career
- Allegiance: United States
- Branch: United States Navy
- Rank: Rear admiral
- Commands: Superintendent of the United States Naval Academy

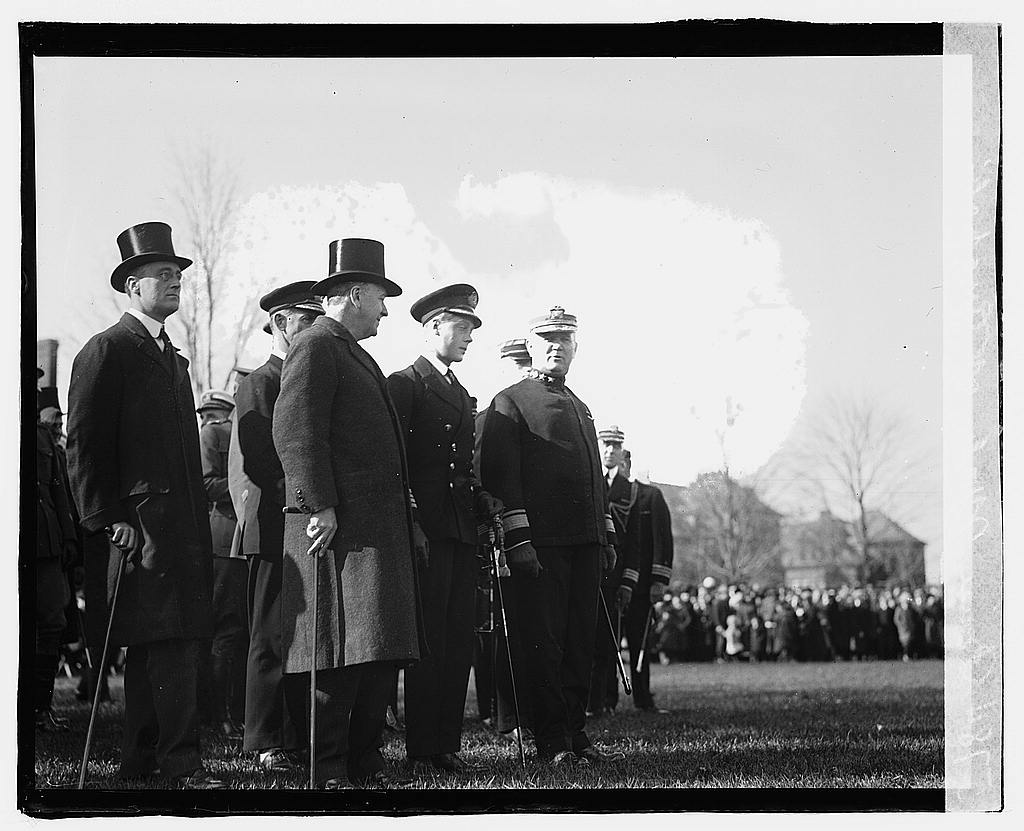
Edward VIII of the United Kingdom, Josephus Daniels, Assistant Secretary of the Navy Franklin D. Roosevelt, and Scales (right) reviewing Naval Cadets at Annapolis on 24 November 1919.

Archibald Henderson Scales (April 14, 1868 – February 16, 1952) was a rear admiral in the United States Navy. He was Superintendent of the United States Naval Academy in Annapolis, Maryland, from February 12, 1919, to July 5, 1921.

== Early life ==
Scales was born in Greensboro, North Carolina, to Junius Irving and Euphemia Hamilton (Henderson). He was the nephew of Alfred Moore Scales, and attended public schools in Greensboro before entering the United States Naval Academy (USNA), which he graduated from in 1887. Scales was made an ensign on July 1, 1889.

== Naval service ==
In 1895, Scales went on duty in Asia, on the ocean off of Amoy, and led the rescue of the German steamer Tai Chiong. He landed at Seoul and protected the Emperor of Korea, who had sought refuge in the Russian legation. Scales then was made a junior lieutenant on August 28, 1897. He served on the USS Topeka during the Spanish–American War, fighting in the Battle of Nipe Bay. He earned the Sampson Medal for service during that war.

He went back to the USNA from 1906 to 1907, commanded the USS Severn in 1906, was executive officer of the USS Columbia until 1907 and the USS Missouri until 1909. While with the Missouri, he went on a trip around the world. Scales was in the Hydrographic Office from 1909 to 1910, and commanded the USS Hartford until 1912, and the USS Prairie until 1913. He next commanded the Receiving Ship of the Naval Training Station in Norfolk, Virginia, until 1916. On May 27, 1916, Scales was appointed commander of the USS Delaware. In that capacity, he fought in World War I as part of the Grand Fleet in the 6th Battalion Squadron under David Beatty. For service in the war, Scales received the Distinguished Service Medal and was made a Commander of the Order of Leopold. Upon the end of the war, Scales assumed command of the Naval Station Great Lakes from December 1918 to February 1919.

He then became Superintendent of the United States Naval Academy, where he handled a scandal. In 1921, he took command of Battleship Division Five. After that, Scales led the Fourth Naval District from 1923 until he retired in 1926. He was a delegate at the Transylvania Celebration in Kentucky and died at the U.S. Naval Hospital in Bethesda, Maryland. He is buried in Arlington National Cemetery. Scales married Harriet Pierce Graham and had three children.
