= Weapons Systems Evaluation Group =

The Weapons Systems Evaluation Group (abbreviated WSEG) was formed in 1949 to carry out Operational Research work for the Joint Chiefs of Staff of the United States Army and the United States Secretary of Defense. The group oversaw the appraisal of weapons used during the Korean War. The group collaborated with Israel in evaluating the effectiveness of Soviet weapons during the Cold War.

== History ==
The first Research Director was Philip M. Morse, who served a year and a half before returning to MIT in the summer of 1950. From 1957 until 1960 John H. Sides was director of WSEG. Lt. Gen. Harvey T. Alness was director from Sept. 1, 1962 until March 1, 1964.

Hugh Everett III worked at the WSEG from 1956 until 1964. Much of his works remains classified. During his time with the WSEG Everett worked on various studies of the Minuteman missile project, which was then starting. Together with George E. Pugh he wrote an influential study The Distribution and Effects of Fallout in Large Nuclear Weapon Campaigns.

Edward Carson Waller III was the director of WSEG in the Office of the Secretary of Defense in 1975. During an interview, Waller stated that the purpose of the WSEG was to undertake the task of systematic collection, organization, and distribution of data having to do with the details of the interactions between opposing weapons and weapons systems utilized in the October, 1973 Middle East War
