= John H. Gibbons (naval officer) =

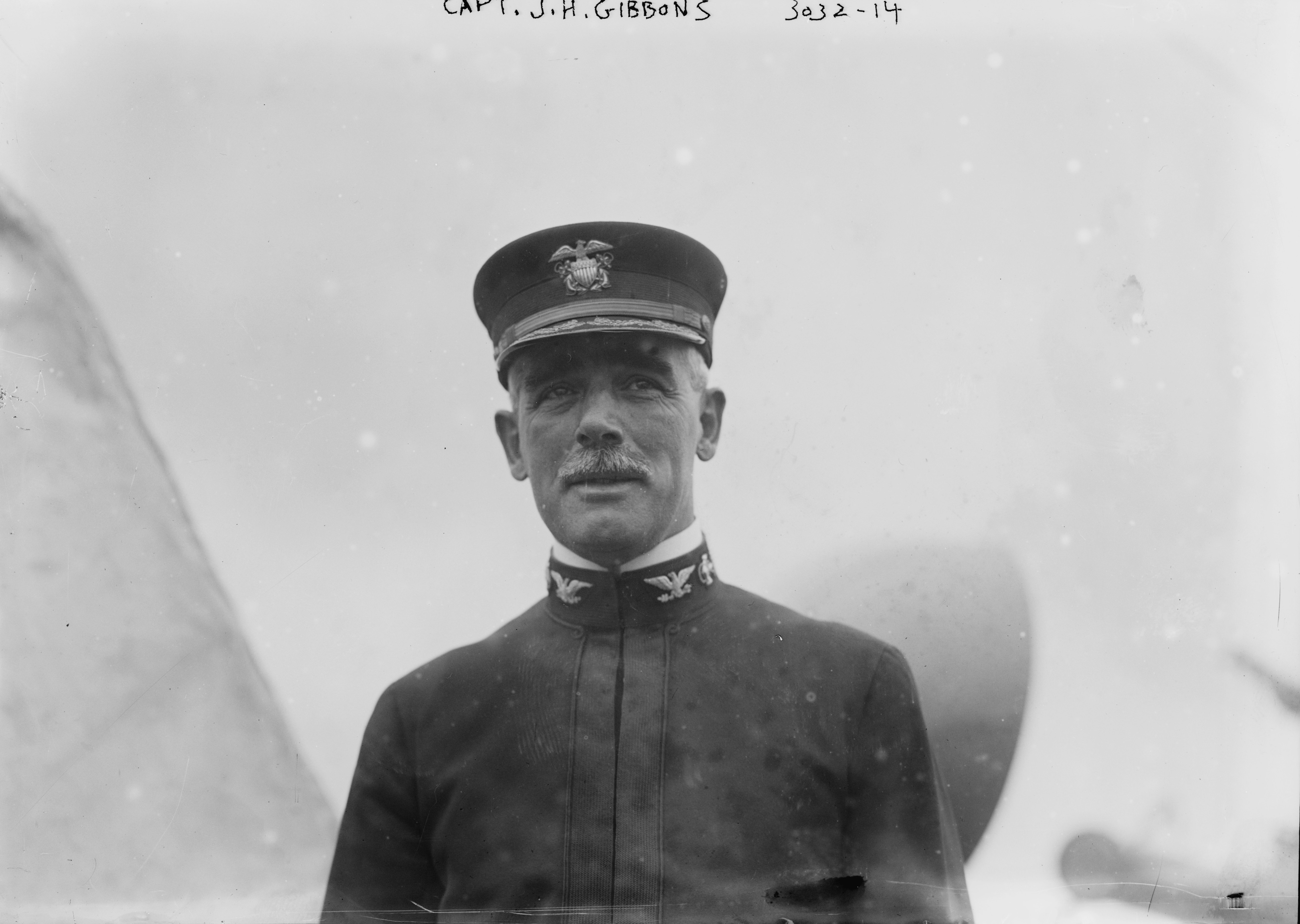
- Born: January 7, 1859; Grand Rapids, Michigan, U.S.
- Died: December 22, 1944 (aged 85); Palm Beach, Florida, U.S.
- Military career
- Allegiance: United States
- Branch: United States Navy
- Rank: Captain
- Service number: c.1881–1914
- Commands: Superintendent of the United States Naval Academy

John Henry Gibbons (January 7, 1859 – December 22, 1944) was a captain in the United States Navy. He was superintendent of the United States Naval Academy in Annapolis, Maryland, from May 11, 1911, to February 7, 1914. He was an 1879 graduate of the Naval Academy.

== Biography ==
=== Early career ===
Gibbons was appointed as a cadet midshipman, from the Fifth District of Michigan on September 18, 1875, and graduated in 1879. He was detached from the academy and was waiting orders on June 10, 1879, before he was assigned to USS Adams, a single-screw, wooden-hulled, bark-rigged steamer, on August 12. He returned to the academy on May 2, 1881, and was promoted to midshipman on June 10, ordered detached from the academy and waiting for orders on June 15, before being assigned to USS New Hampshire on August 19. He was then assigned to USS Jamestown on January 5, 1882, promoted to ensign (junior grade) on March 3, 1883 and promoted to ensign on June 26, 1884.

Gibbons was ordered detached and waiting for orders on March 2, 1885, assigned to the United States Naval Observatory on May 18, then to the Naval Academy on September 1. He was assigned to the sloop of war USS Constellation on May 20, 1886, then returned to the academy on September 1. He was ordered detached and waiting for orders on September 1, 1888 and assigned six days later to USS Mohican on September 7. Gibbons was transferred to USS Vandalia on January 14, 1889, and would face a near-death experience two months later.

=== Hurricane ===
Gibbons almost lost his life in a massive hurricane in Apia, Samoa, on March 16, on which Gibbons was serving aboard Vandalia as a junior officer. It was "the severest disaster which has befallen the Navy in recent years" to quote the annual report of the Secretary of the Navy for that period. During the hurricane, Gibbons and some of his shipmates went up the mast and formed a human wind-sail, in an effort to prevent the vessel from being driven ashore. The elements were too much for them, with Vandalia and USS Trenton being wrecked. They were described as "two of the best of the old wooden fleet". Native Samoans assisted the naval personnel ashore, with much of the armament and equipment of the two vessels being saved. In addition, USS Nipsic was run ashore, to save her from destruction. Rear Admiral Lewis A. Kimberly, U.S. Navy, commanding the Pacific station, reported the disaster to the Navy Department. The gallantry and fortitude displayed by Kimberly, his officers and men, at the time of the disaster, called forth commendations of the department.

A little over two months after his near death experience, Gibbons was ordered detached and assigned to Adams on May 28. On July 16, 1890, he was ordered detached and assigned to temporary duty on the venerable USS Independence. He received preparatory orders, for assignment to Nipsic on July 31 but those orders were revoked and he was ordered detached from Independence and assigned to the United States Coast and Geodetic Survey on August 9.

Gibbons returned to the Naval Academy on August 10, 1891, where he was promoted to lieutenant (junior grade) on December 6. He was assigned to ordnance duty at the Navy Yard, Washington, D.C., on September 9. Twenty-two months later, he was assigned to the protected cruiser USS Chicago on July 20, 1894. The following year, he was detached and returned home, "to be ready for sea" on May 1, 1895, then assigned six weeks later to the cruiser USS Raleigh on June 13. He was promoted to lieutenant on February 28, 1896 and assigned to the Assistant Secretary's Office on April 8, 1897.

=== Spanish–American War ===
Gibbon was transferred to the cruiser USS Newark on May 21, 1898 and saw service in Cuban waters, during the Battle of Manzanillo and the bombardment of Morro Castle.

In early 1899, he was assigned to the battleship USS Massachusetts on February 18, where he was to serve for almost eight months, before being transferred to the armored cruiser USS Brooklyn on October 8. While with Brooklyn, Gibbons was to see action in the Philippines in 1888–1889 and in China during the Boxer Rebellion of 1900.

=== Mid-career ===
Gibbons was transferred to the battleship USS Oregon on May 4, 1901, returned home and waited for orders on June 24, before being assigned to the Branch Hydrographic Office in Buffalo, New York, on August 5. It was at this office that hydrographic surveys were conducted, which is the science of measurement and description of features which affect maritime navigation, marine construction, dredging, etc. He was in Buffalo at the same time as the Pan-American Expedition, the World's Fair that was held between May 1 and November 2. He was assigned to the Office of Naval Intelligence on November 11 and promoted to lieutenant commander on February 9, 1902.

He was named commander of USS Dolphin on June 11, 1903, and held the post with that ship until November 1905. Dolphin was used by Presidents Theodore Roosevelt and William Howard Taft. Dolphin, under the command of Gibbons, was part of the review of the North Atlantic Fleet of the United States Navy in 1905. He was ordered detached and returned home, waiting for orders on November 20, 1905. He was assigned as naval attaché in London, England, via passage from New York on December 16. The following year, he was appointed naval attaché to the Minister to Sweden and Norway on June 7, 1906, for the coronation of King Haakon and Queen Maud at Nidaros Cathedral in Trondheim on June 22, 1906.

Six months later, Gibbons was promoted to commander on Christmas Day, December 25, 1906. He was named aide to Rear-Admiral Charles H. Stockton at the Conference of the International Prize Court in London, England, on July 29, 1908. He was ordered detached on relief on June 13, 1909, in order to command the cruiser USS Charleston via Saint Petersburg and the Siberian Route to Woosung, China, on July 21 or to Chefoo (now Yangtai), China, on July 31. He was ordered detached when Charleston was decommissioned and returned home, waiting for orders on October 8, 1910, followed by his promotion to captain on October 20, 1909.

Three weeks later, he was placed on duty as a member of the General Board in Washington, D.C., on November 10. Gibbons was called into Washington on temporary duty frequently throughout his career. He was ordered detached from the General Board on May 15, 1911, and placed on duty for three years as Superintendent of the United States Naval Academy at Annapolis, Maryland, from 1911 to 1914. He was ordered detached upon relief on February 7, 1914, to the battleship USS Michigan for passage and departed on the 9th, in order to fall in with the battleship USS Louisiana, where he was to take command of that vessel, reporting for duty on February 16.

=== USS Utah ===
Now, at the age of 55, he was named captain of the battleship USS Utah, taking passage from New York on April 23, 1914, for Mexico. By the end of June 1914 Utah steamed back to the New York Navy Yard, with the exploits of the bombardment and the taking of Vera Cruz, Mexico in April vividly ingrained in the minds of the American people. Gibbons had headed the landing party of Marines and Bluejackets.

=== "Plucking" board ===
A few days after arriving in New York, Captain Gibbons thirty-five year career in the Navy ended, as he was transferred to the retired list on June 30, retiring in early July 1914. He had been "plucked" or forcibly retired by the board of five rear admirals known as the Selection Board of Retirement, thus becoming a "cause celebre" of the peacetime Navy. Captain Gibbons' fight to obtain reinstatement to active duty was aided by former President Theodore Roosevelt, the noted war correspondent Richard Harding Davis and others, resulting as Davis had predicted in the "plucking" of the "Plucking Board" itself. Assistant Secretary of the Navy Franklin D. Roosevelt, named by Secretary Josephus Daniels to head a commission of inquiry and to recommend a new retirement plan to Congress, was instrumental in bringing this about.

At the time he was "plucked", Gibbons boasted a brilliant record ashore and afloat. The official reason given by Rear Admiral Austin M. Knight, one of the board members, for the "plucking" of Captain Gibbons was that he had "added absolutely nothing to the efficiency of the Navy, but detracted from efficiency." The House Naval Committee heard other "unofficial" reasons which had to do with the naval officer's "English accent" and his presumed "airs" and social activities. This developed criticism had centered around whether he had returned from his tour of duty in London with an "English accent", with "English clothes" and with a retinue of English servants. However, the questions were never satisfactorily answered. Gibbon was quoted as saying: "I belong -- or did belong -- to a service wherein all orders must be obeyed without question. It does not make a man want to cheer when he finds himself suddenly cut off from his lifework. But that is part of the game." It was in vain that Theodore Roosevelt stated that Gibbons was "in every position a man of marked efficiency -- one of the most useful men in the Navy", and that "from the standpoint of the country, I regret very greatly that there is danger of our losing his services." In a letter to the New York Times, in which he embodied the aforementioned quotations from a letter written to him by Colonel Roosevelt, Richard Harding Davis, the noted war correspondent, who had come from Mexico on the Utah, vigorously defended Captain Gibbons' "practically unimpeachable record", and wrote, "This year the 'Plucking Board' has eliminated officers of such value to the service that hereafter undoubtedly the 'Plucking Board' itself will be eliminated."

=== World War I and final assignments ===
Three years later, after the furor of the "Plucking" episode had died down, Captain Gibbons was recalled for service, as the United States had officially entered the First World War on April 6, 1917. He returned to active duty the following day, April 7, reporting to the First Naval District, Navy Yard, Boston, Massachusetts, for duty as commander of naval forces of the First Naval District effective April 9, 1917. He held that post for five months, before accepting temporary duty, reporting to the Director of Naval Intelligence, Bureau of Naval Intelligence, Navy Department in Washington, D.C., on September 17. Two months after arriving in Washington, he was further directed, to be detached and on duty as a naval attaché in Buenos Aires, Argentina, arriving to take the post on November 13. He would remain in Argentina for the remainder of the war and then some, totaling twenty-nine months, his term ending on April 15, 1920. He was posted to the Office of Naval Intelligence, Navy Department, in Washington, D.C., on May 22, 1920, returning home and relieved of all active duty on July 31.

Gibbons was a member of the Military Order of the Dragon.

== Awards ==
During his naval career, Gibbons was entitled to the following campaign medals:

- West Indies Naval Campaign Medal (a.k.a. the Sampson Medal) (While with USS Newark.)
- Spanish Campaign Medal (No. 335, while with USS Newark, approved on May 13, 1908)
- Philippine Campaign Medal (No. 90, while with USS Brooklyn and General Alava, approved on May 13, 1908)
- China Relief Expedition Medal (No. 100, while commander of USS Brooklyn)
- Mexican Service Medal (while commander of USS Utah)
- WWI Victory Medal
