= Charles S. Minter Jr. =

United States Navy officer

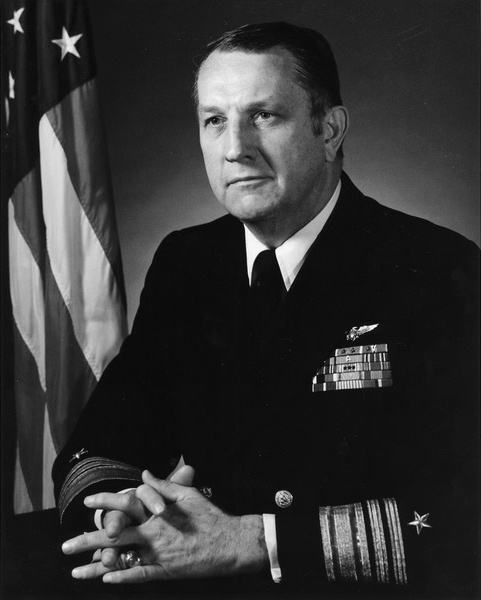
- Born: January 23, 1915; Pocahontas, Virginia, U.S.
- Died: April 18, 2008 (aged 93); Annapolis, Maryland, U.S.
- Military career
- Allegiance: United States
- Branch: United States Navy
- Rank: Vice admiral
- Commands: Superintendent of the United States Naval Academy, others below

Charles Stamps Minter Jr. (January 23, 1915 – April 18, 2008) was a vice admiral in the United States Navy. He was Superintendent of the United States Naval Academy in Annapolis, Maryland, from January 11, 1964, to June 12, 1965. Additional commands he held during his almost 40-year career in the Navy include that of USS Albemarle, USS Intrepid, Deputy Chief of Naval Operations (Logistics), Commander, Fleet Air Wing, Pacific, Commandant of Midshipmen at the United States Naval Academy and Deputy Chairman of the NATO Military Committee. He retired in 1974 and died in 2008. His wife of 67 years, Mary Margaret Skeehan Minter died 2 months later, on June 14, 2008.

== Military awards and decorations ==
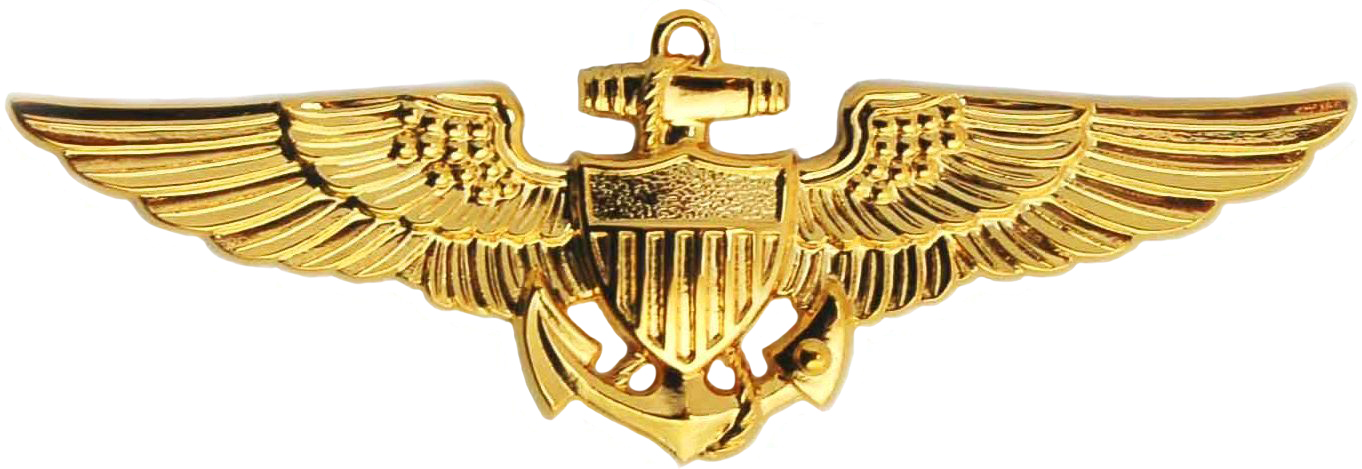

Naval aviator insignia
1st Row	Legion of Merit w/ two 3/16" Gold Stars		Bronze Star Medal w/ Combat "V" and one 3/16" Gold Stars
2nd Row	Navy Commendation Medal one 3/16" Gold Stars	American Defense Service Medal w/ "A" Device	American Campaign Medal
3rd Row	European–African–Middle Eastern Campaign Medal	Asiatic–Pacific Campaign Medal w/ three 3/16" bronze star	World War II Victory Medal
4th Row	China Service Medal	Navy Occupation Service Medal	National Defense Service Medal w/ one 3/16" bronze star
5th Row	Korean Service Medal	United Nations Service Medal Korea	Philippine Liberation Medal

Academic offices
Preceded by Charles Cochran Kirkpatrick	Superintendent of United States Naval Academy; 1964–1965	Succeeded by Draper L. Kauffman
