= Michael Borgschulte =

U.S. Marine Corps general

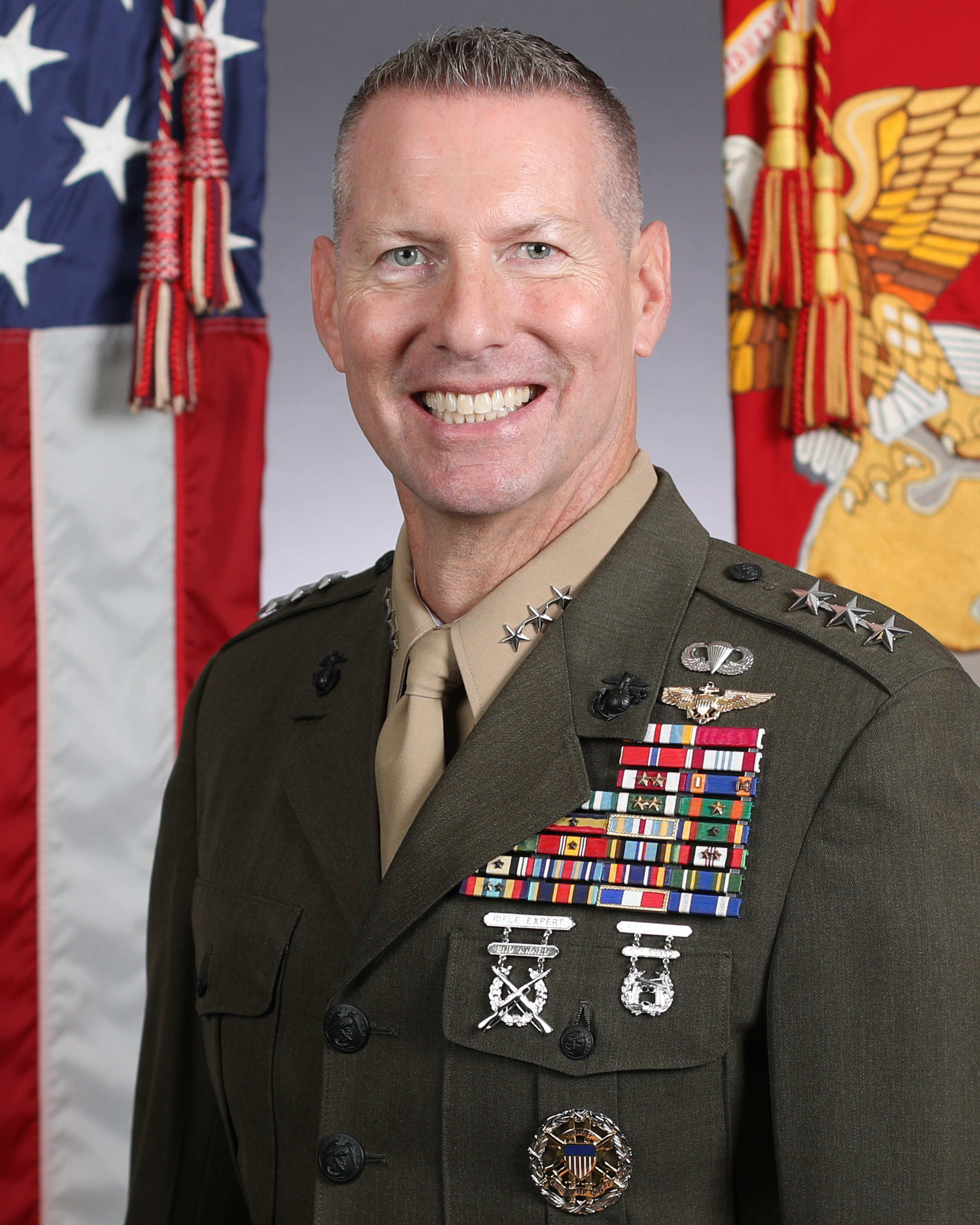
- Official portrait, 2024
- Born: c. 1969 (age 56–57)
- Education: United States Naval Academy (BS); Naval War College (MA)
- Military career
- Allegiance: United States
- Branch: United States Marine Corps
- Service years: 1991–present
- Rank: Lieutenant General
- Commands: United States Naval Academy; 3rd Marine Aircraft Wing; Marine Aircraft Group 39; HMLA-367
- Awards: Defense Superior Service Medal; Legion of Merit; Bronze Star

Michael J. Borgschulte (born c. 1969) is a United States Marine Corps lieutenant general who has served as the 66th Superintendent of the United States Naval Academy, since 2025. He is the first Marine officer appointed to the role.

Prior to assuming command at the Naval Academy, Borgschulte served as the deputy commandant for manpower and reserve affairs of the Marine Corps from 2024 to 2025. He previously commanded the 3rd Marine Aircraft Wing from 2023 to 2024.

== Military career ==
After graduating from the Naval Academy in 1991, where he was a linebacker on the football team, he started his Marine Corps career as an attack helicopter pilot.

Borgschulte has served as the director of manpower management of the Marine Corps. In March 2023, he was nominated for promotion to lieutenant general and assignment as deputy commandant for manpower and reserve affairs. In July 2025, he was nominated for reappointment as a lieutenant general and assignment as superintendent of the United States Naval Academy, becoming the first Marine officer to hold that position. Traditionally, the Navy appointed a vice admiral as the Naval Academy superintendent.

== Awards and decorations ==
Borgschultes' decorations and medals include:

Army Basic Parachutist Insignia
Naval Aviator Badge
Defense Superior Service Medal	Legion of Merit	Bronze Star Medal	Defense Meritorious Service Medal
Meritorious Service Medal with two gold award stars	Air Medal with gold award numeral 1 and bronze strike/flight numeral 14	Joint Service Commendation Medal	Navy and Marine Corps Commendation Medal with two gold award stars
Navy and Marine Corps Achievement Medal with gold award star	Presidential Unit Citation with bronze service star	Joint Meritorious Unit Award	Navy Unit Commendation with bronze service star
Navy Meritorious Unit Commendation with two bronze service stars	National Defense Service Medal with bronze service star	Armed Forces Expeditionary Medal	Afghanistan Campaign Medal with two bronze service stars
Iraq Campaign Medal with bronze service star	Global War on Terrorism Expeditionary Medal	Global War on Terrorism Service Medal	Korea Defense Service Medal
Sea Service Deployment Ribbon with six service stars	Navy and Marine Corps Overseas Service Ribbon	Philippines Presidential Unit Citation	NATO Medal for service with Non-Article 5
Rifle Expert Badge		Pistol Expert Badge	
Office of the Joint Chiefs of Staff Identification Badge

Military offices
Preceded by Craig Crenshaw	Director of Manpower Management of the United States Marine Corps; 2020–2023	Succeeded by Ryan S. Rideout
Preceded by Bradford Gering	Commanding General of the 3rd Marine Aircraft Wing; 2023–2024	Succeeded by James B. Wellons
Preceded by James F. Glynn	Deputy Commandant for Manpower and Reserve Affairs of the United States Marine Corps; 2024–2025	Succeeded by William J. Bowers
Preceded by Yvette M. Davids	66th Superintendent of the United States Naval Academy; 2025-present	Incumbent
