= Edward C. Waller III =

United States Navy admiral (1926–2021)

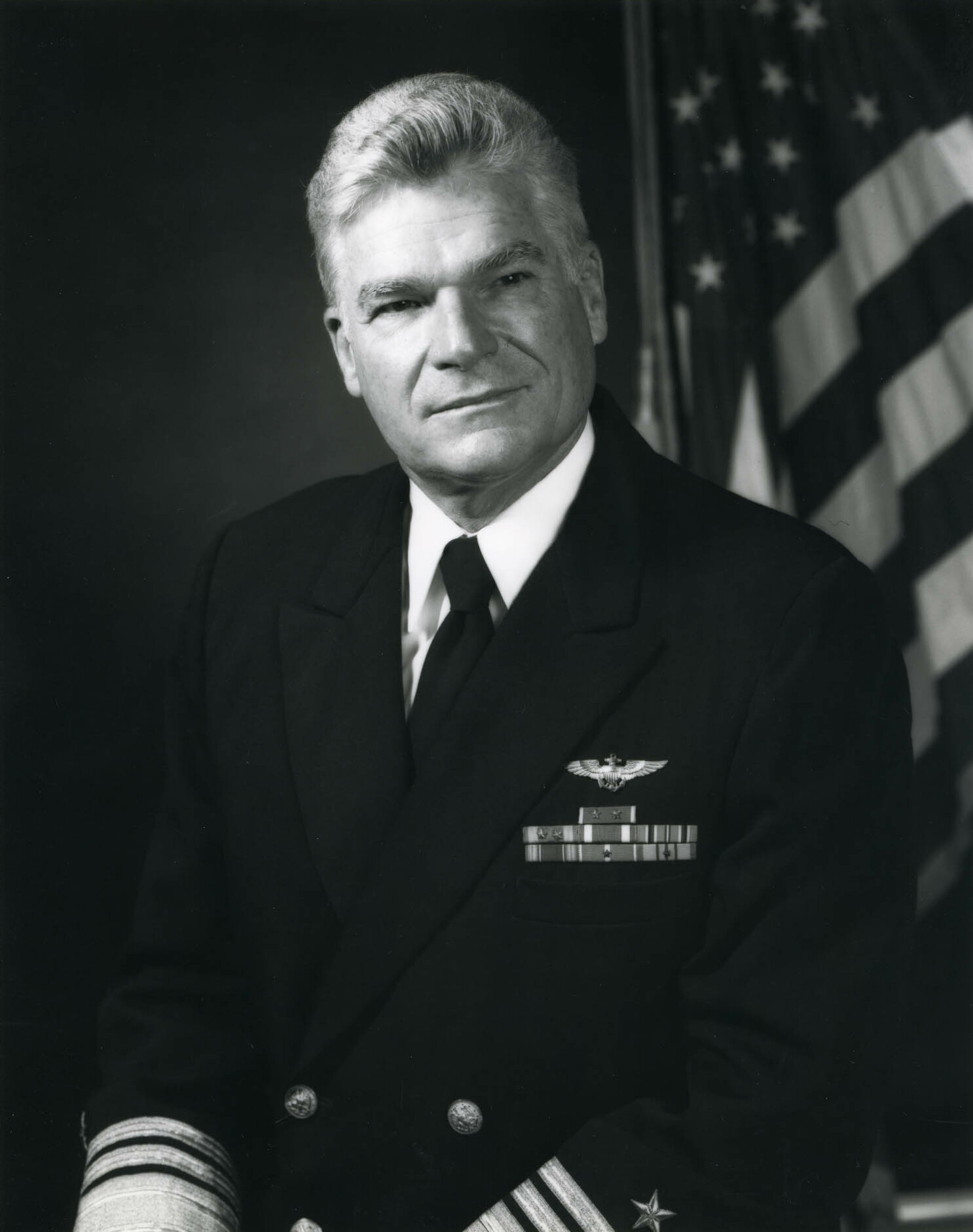
- Born: January 24, 1926; Chicago, Illinois, U.S.
- Died: March 2, 2021 (aged 95); Annapolis, Maryland, U.S.
- Military career
- Allegiance: United States
- Branch: United States Navy
- Service years: c.1944–1983
- Rank: Vice admiral
- Commands: Superintendent of the United States Naval Academy

Edward Carson Waller III (January 24, 1926 – March 2, 2021) was a vice admiral in the United States Navy. He was Superintendent of the United States Naval Academy in Annapolis, Maryland, from August 22, 1981, to retirement on August 31, 1983.

== Life timeline ==
- 1926 Born on January 24 in Chicago, Illinois.
- 1944 On September 29, enlists in the U.S. Naval Reserve.
- 1945 Appointed to the United States Naval Academy by the Secretary of the Navy.
- 1949 On June 3, graduates from the United States Naval Academy and is commissioned Ensign. Assigned to the United States Naval Academy Executive Department for plebe indoctrination. In September, reports for flight training at Naval Station Pensacola and, later, Naval Air Station Corpus Christi.

1951 On March 23, designated Naval Aviator. Assigned to Fleet Air Wing 14 for operational training. In September, assigned to patrol squadron duty with Patrol Squadron 892 and Patrol Squadron 50.

- 1952 In March, deploys with the Formosa Patrol Force until September.
- 1953 In June, deploys to Korea until December.
- 1954 In June, reports to the Naval Postgraduate School for instruction.
- 1956 Receives a Bachelor of Science in Aeronautical Engineering from the Naval Postgraduate School.
- 1957 Receives a Master of Science in Electrical Engineering from the Naval Postgraduate School. In July, assigned to Air Development Squadron 1 as Avionics Engineer.
- 1959 In July, reports to the Naval War College for instruction in the Command and Staff Course.
- 1960 In July, assigned to Patrol Squadron 48 as Anti-submarine Warfare Officer and Operations Officer.
- 1962 In April, detaches from Patrol Squadron 48.
- 1963 In February, completes training at Naval Test Pilot School in Patuxent River, Maryland. Assigned to the Naval Air Test Center, Patuxent, Maryland as Program Officer in the Weapons Systems Test Division for Project A-NEW (P-3C and S-3A development).
- 1965 In May, detaches from the Naval Air Test Center for duty with Patrol Squadron 44 as Executive Officer and, later, Commanding Officer.
- 1967 In April, reports to Naval Air Systems Command Headquarters as Project Manager for the P-3 Anti-submarine Warfare Weapons System Project.
- 1969 In August, reports to the Industrial College of the Armed Forces for instruction.
- 1970 In September, graduates from the Industrial College of the Armed Forces. In September, assumes command of U.S.S. Charleston (Amphibious cargo ship: LKA-113).
- 1971 Selected for promotion to Rear Admiral. In September, appointed Commander Fleet Air Wings, U.S. Pacific Fleet and Commander Fleet Air, Moffett Field.
- 1973 In January, reports as Commander, Anti-submarine Warfare Systems Project Office in the Office of Naval Material with additional duty as Director, Anti-submarine Warfare Office in the Office of the Chief of Naval Operations.
- 1975 In February, promoted to Vice Admiral. In February, named Director, Weapons Systems Evaluation Group in the Office of the Secretary of Defense.
- 1976 In July, reports as Director, Anti-submarine Warfare and Ocean Surveillance Programs in the Office of the Chief of Naval Operations.
- 1979 In October, assumes command of the U.S. Third Fleet.
- 1981 On August 22, relieves Vice Admiral William P. Lawrence as Superintendent of the United States Naval Academy.
- 1983 On August 31, relieved by Vice Admiral Charles R. Larson as Superintendent of the United States Naval Academy, and subsequently retires from the United States Navy.
- 2021 Dies on March 2 in Annapolis, Maryland.

== Career ==
A 1949 graduate of the Naval Academy.

As the director of the Weapons Systems Evaluation Group (WSEG), Waller led the study of performance of various Soviet and U.S. weapons systems when used in opposition to each other, including the details of the interactions between opposing weapons and weapons systems utilized in the October, 1973 Middle East War.

== Awards ==
He is a recipient of the Navy Distinguished Service Medal and Legion of Merit.

== Personal life ==
he was married to Margaret Clifford Gelly. She died May 15, 2013, at the age of 82.[5]
