= William P. Mack =

United States Navy admiral

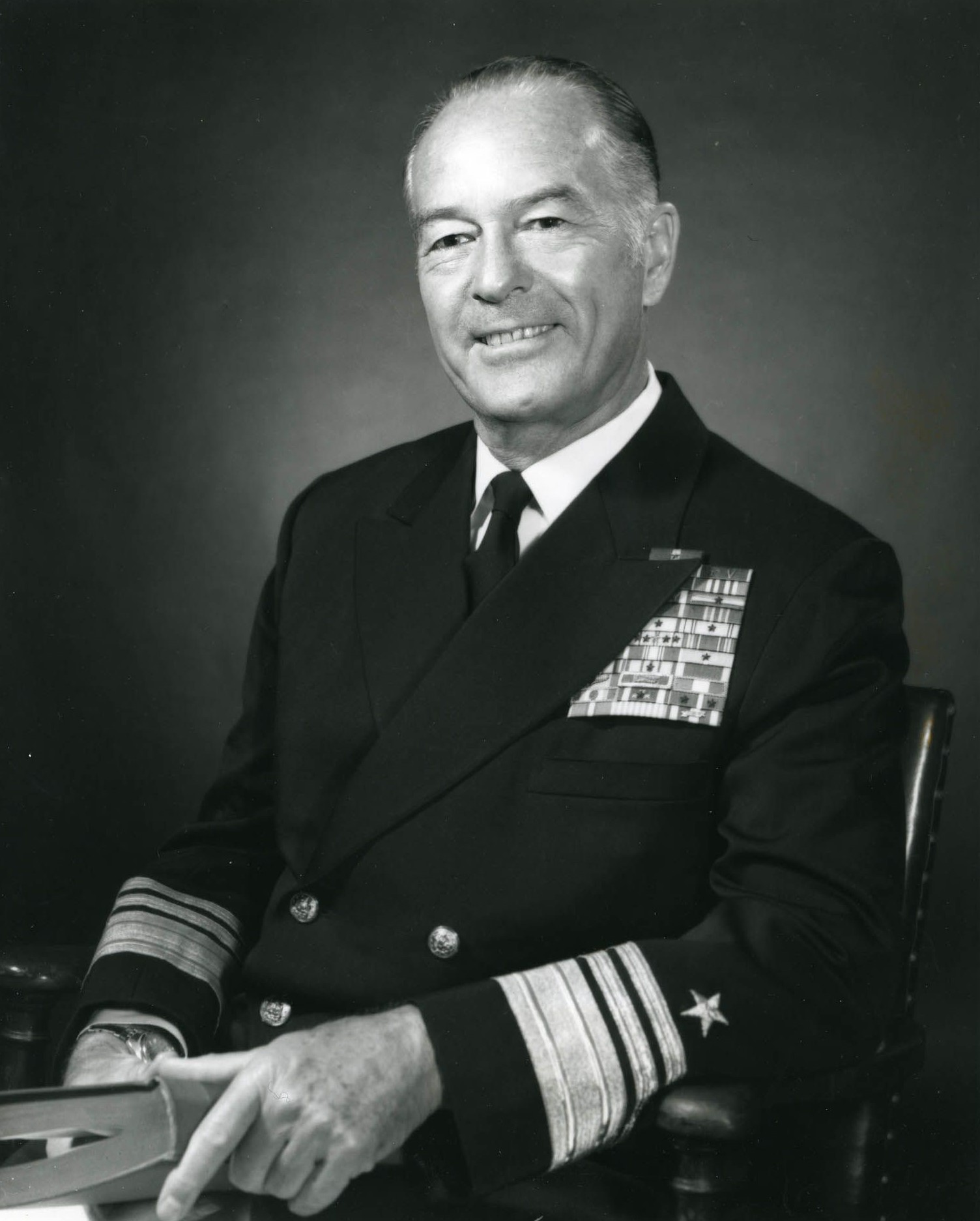
- Born: August 6, 1915; Hillsboro, Illinois, U.S.
- Died: January 15, 2003 (aged 87); Annapolis, Maryland, U.S.
- Spouse(s): Ruth Mack (d.1996), Elsie Sutherlin Mack
- Military career
- Allegiance: United States
- Branch: United States Navy
- Service years: c.1937–1975
- Rank: Vice admiral
- Commands: Superintendent of the United States Naval Academy

William Paden Mack (August 6, 1915 – January 15, 2003) was a vice admiral in the United States Navy. He was Superintendent of the United States Naval Academy in Annapolis, Maryland from June 16, 1972 to his retirement on August 1, 1975. He was a 1937 graduate of the Naval Academy. He was later a writer.

== Personal life ==
Mack's first wife was Ruth Mack (d.1996). Mack's second wife was Elsie Sutherlin Mack. Mack had two children, William and Margaret, and two step-children. On January 15, 2003, Mack died at home in Annapolis, Maryland.
