= Lawrence Heyworth Jr. =

United States Navy admiral (1921–2003)

- Born: February 10, 1921; Chicago, Illinois, U.S.
- Died: May 4, 2003 (aged 82); Virginia Beach, Virginia, U.S.
- Military career
- Allegiance: United States
- Branch: United States Navy
- Service years: 1942–1973
- Rank: Rear admiral
- Commands: Superintendent of the United States Naval Academy
- Conflicts: World War II
- Awards: Legion of Merit; Navy and Marine Corps Medal; Bronze Star Medal (2); Navy and Marine Corps Commendation Medal

Lawrence Heyworth Jr. (February 10, 1921 – May 4, 2003) was a rear admiral in the United States Navy. He was superintendent of the United States Naval Academy in Annapolis, Maryland, from June 22 to July 20, 1968. He was a 1943 graduate of the Naval Academy. He was one of the 32 finalists for NASA Astronaut Group 1 in 1959, but ultimately was not selected. His grandson is Lieutenant Commander Lawrence Heyworth IV, who served as commanding officer of USS Sentry from December 2015 to April 2017.
