= USS Severn (1899) =

Tender of the United States Navy

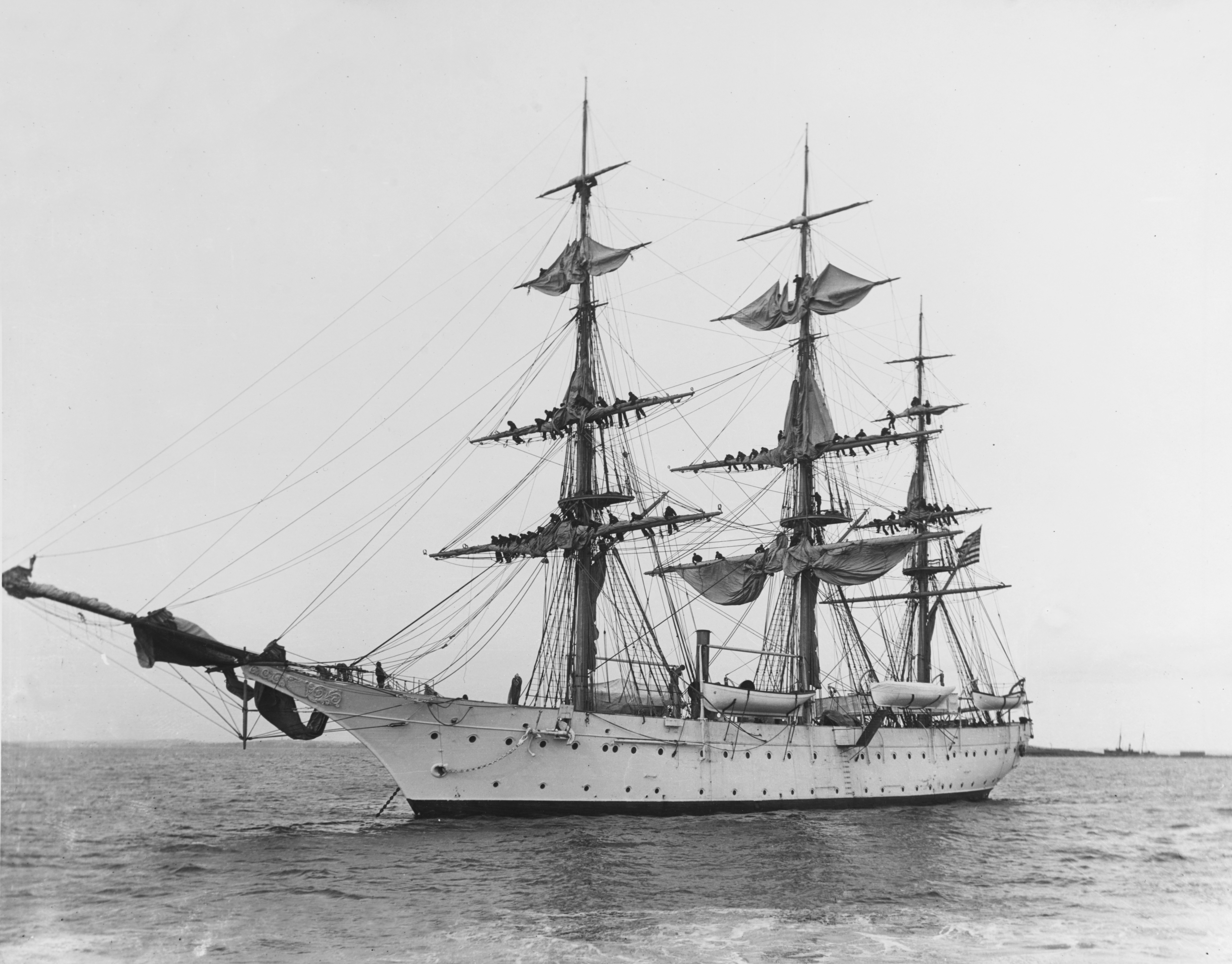
- USS Severn (1898)United States Naval Academy Midshipmen furl sails aboard the ship in her period as Naval Academy training ship 1900–10

History

United States
- Name: USS Chesapeake and USS Severn
- Namesake: The Chesapeake Bay in Maryland and Virginia; The Severn River in Maryland
- Builder: Bath Iron Works, Bath, Maine
- Laid down: 2 August 1898
- Launched: 30 June 1899
- Sponsored by: Miss Elise Bradford
- Commissioned: 12 April 1900
- Decommissioned: 3 October 1916 (final time)
- Renamed: USS Severn, 15 June 1905
- Reclassified: submarine tender 1910
- Fate: Sold 7 December 1916

General characteristics
- Type: Training ship (1900–10); Submarine tender (1910–16)
- Displacement: 1,175 long tons (1,194 t)
- Length: 224 ft 3 in (68.35 m)
- Beam: 37 ft (11 m)
- Draft: 16 ft (4.9 m)
- Propulsion: Sails plus auxiliary steam power
- Sail plan: Three-masted full-rigged ship
- Complement: As training ship: 113 crew and 122 midshipmen
- Armament: 6 × 4 inches (100 mm) guns; 4 × 6-pounder guns; 2 × 1-pounder guns

The third USS Chesapeake and second USS Severn was a three-masted, sheathed, wooden-hulled full-rigged ship with auxiliary steam power in commission in the United States Navy during most of the period between 1900 and 1916.

== Construction and commissioning ==
USS Chesapeake was laid down on 2 August 1898 by Bath Iron Works at Bath, Maine. She was launched on 30 June 1899, sponsored by Miss Elise Bradford, and commissioned on 12 April 1900.

== Service history ==
=== As Chesapeake ===
Chesapeake was towed to Annapolis, Maryland, where she assumed duties as station ship and as training ship for midshipmen at the United States Naval Academy. Renamed Severn on 15 June 1905, she decommissioned twice for repair and overhaul, provided facilities for seamanship drills at the Naval Academy and conducted summer cruises off southern New England through 1909.

=== As Severn ===
On 15 February 1910, Severn was ordered refitted as a submarine tender. On completion of that work in mid-May 1910, she reported for duty with the 3rd Submarine Division. Until 1913, she performed submarine tender duties off New England during the summer and in the Chesapeake Bay during the winter, her movements being accomplished under tow. She was decommissioned a third time for overhaul after summer maneuvers in 1913.

Severn was recommissioned on 15 November 1913 and transferred to the Panama Canal Zone. She arrived at Coco Solo, Panama, on 12 December 1913 and served as tender to the 1st Submarine Division until July 1916.

Severn was ordered back to the United States in July 1916. She arrived at Norfolk, Virginia, under tow by collier Nereus, on 1 August 1916.

=== Final decommissioning and disposal ===
Severn was decommissioned for the last time on 3 October 1916. She was sold to F. G. McDonald of Ardmore, Pennsylvania, on 7 December 1916.
