= John F. Davidson =

United States Navy admiral

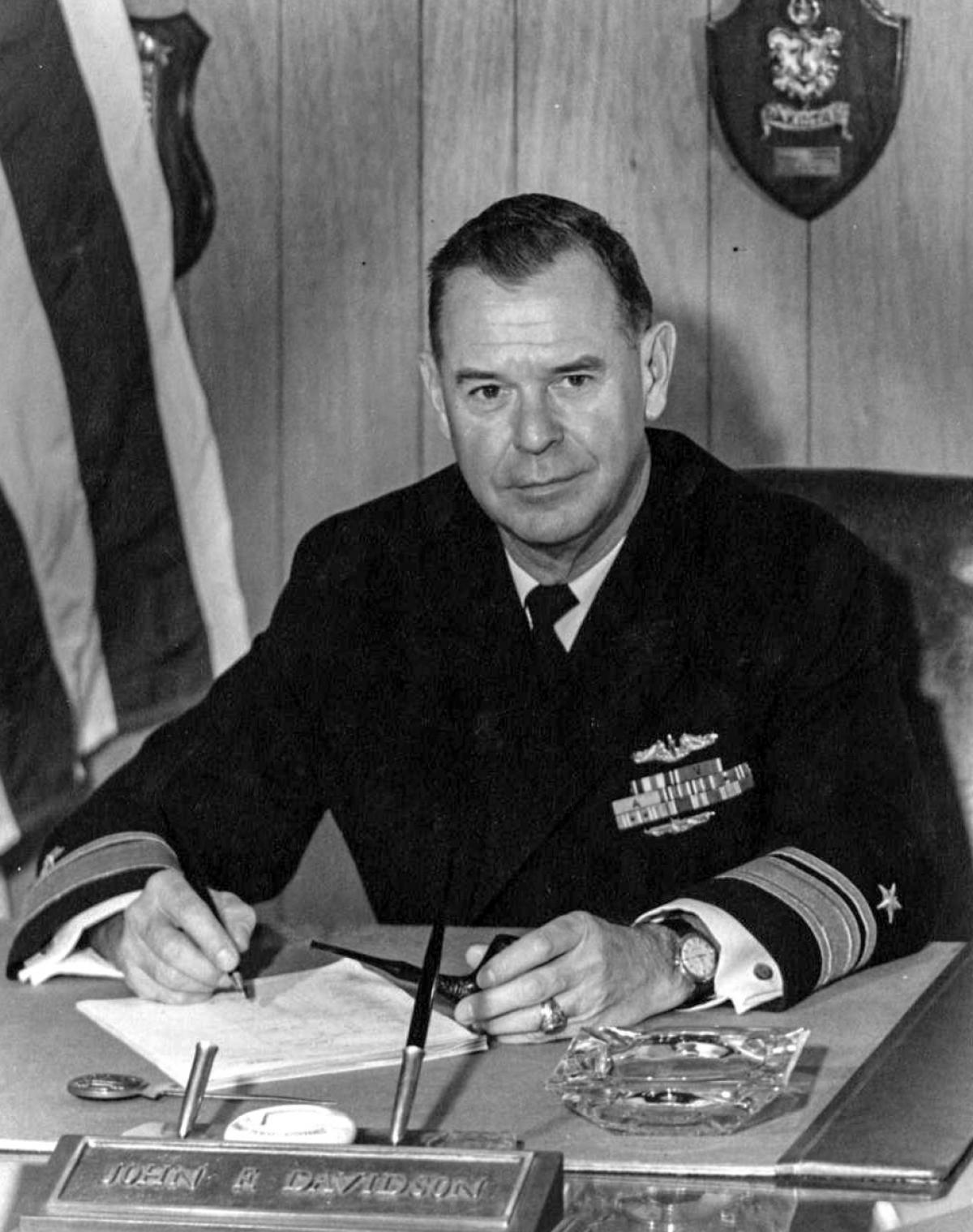
- Born: May 3, 1908; Olean, New York, U.S.
- Died: January 21, 1989 (aged 80); Annapolis, Maryland, U.S.
- Military career
- Allegiance: United States
- Branch: United States Navy
- Service years: 1929–1962
- Rank: Rear admiral
- Commands: Superintendent of the United States Naval Academy

John Frederick Davidson (May 3, 1908 – January 21, 1989) was a rear admiral in the United States Navy. He was Superintendent of the United States Naval Academy in Annapolis, Maryland from June 22, 1960 to August 18, 1962. He was a 1929 graduate of the Naval Academy.
