= James L. Holloway Jr. =

United States admiral (1898–1984)

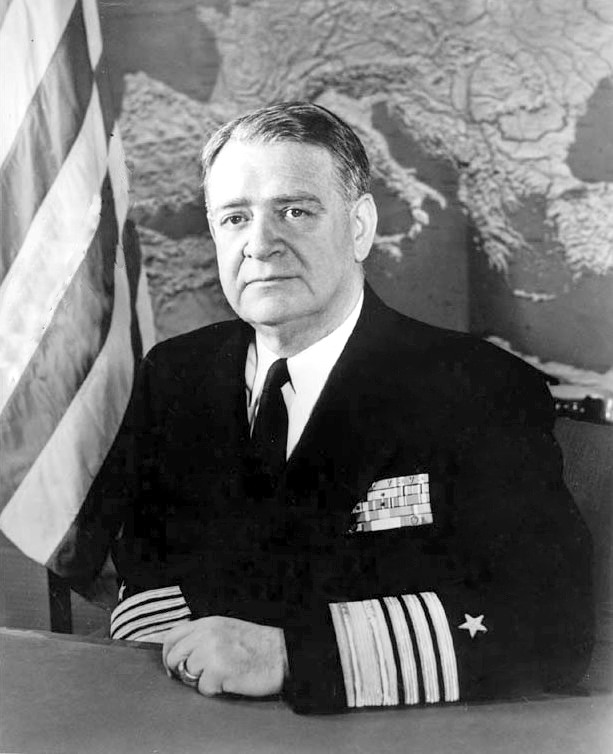
- Admiral James L. Holloway Jr.
- Born: June 20, 1898; Fort Smith, Arkansas, U.S.
- Died: January 11, 1984 (aged 85); Falls Church, Virginia, U.S.
- Alma mater: United States Naval Academy
- Relatives: Major General Johnson Hagood (father-in-law); Admiral James L. Holloway III (son); Rear Admiral Lawrence Heyworth Jr. (son-in-law); Astronaut Wally Schirra (stepson-in-law)
- Military career
- Allegiance: United States
- Branch: United States Navy
- Service years: 1918–1959
- Rank: Admiral
- Nicknames: Lord Jim; Gentleman Jim; Lord Plushbottom; Whiskey Jim
- Commands: United States Naval Forces, Eastern Atlantic and Mediterranean
- Conflicts: World War I World War II; Lebanon crisis of 1958
- Awards: Navy Distinguished Service Medal; Legion of Merit (2)
- Other work: Governor, United States Naval Home

James Lemuel Holloway Jr. (June 20, 1898 – January 11, 1984) was a four-star admiral in the United States Navy who served as superintendent of the United States Naval Academy from 1947 to 1950; as Chief of Naval Personnel from 1953 to 1957; and as commander in chief of all United States naval forces in the eastern Atlantic and Mediterranean from 1957 to 1959, in which capacity he commanded the 1958 American intervention in Lebanon. As founder of the Holloway Plan, he was responsible for creating the modern Naval Reserve Officer Training Corps.

Holloway was the father of four-star admiral and Chief of Naval Operations Admiral James L. Holloway III. As of 2019, they are the only father and son to both serve as four-star admirals in the United States Navy while on active duty, as opposed to being promoted to that rank posthumously or at retirement.

== Early career ==
Holloway was born on June 20, 1898, in Fort Smith, Arkansas, to future centenarian James Lemuel Holloway and the former Mary George Leaming. In 1904, his family moved to Dallas, Texas, where he was a varsity football tackle and a member of the debate team at Oak Cliff High School, from which he graduated in 1915. Unable to secure an appointment to the United States Military Academy—his original ambition—Holloway instead passed the entrance examinations for the United States Naval Academy at Annapolis, Maryland, and entered the Naval Academy as a midshipman in 1915. He graduated in June 1918 near the bottom of the accelerated class of 1919, ranked 149th out of 199, and later said he had avoided flunking out of the Academy only because his class graduated early due to World War I. "I knew I would have bilged in mechanics."

=== World War I ===
Commissioned ensign on June 7, 1918, Holloway was assigned to the destroyer Monaghan, operating out of Brest, France, as part of the destroyer force tasked with anti-submarine patrols against German U-boats in European waters. He made a poor impression almost immediately. "They never told me about the lack of space on destroyers. My baggage filled the whole wardroom. I was a very unpopular young officer for that." Nevertheless, he was promoted to lieutenant (junior grade) in September.

In January 1919, Holloway was assigned to the battleship Florida, a tour that included duty as aide and flag lieutenant to Rear Admiral Frederick B. Bassett Jr. As the admiral's aide, Holloway visited Brazil, Argentina, and Uruguay when Florida carried Secretary of State Bainbridge Colby and his party on a diplomatic cruise to South American and Caribbean ports in 1920.

=== Inter-war period ===
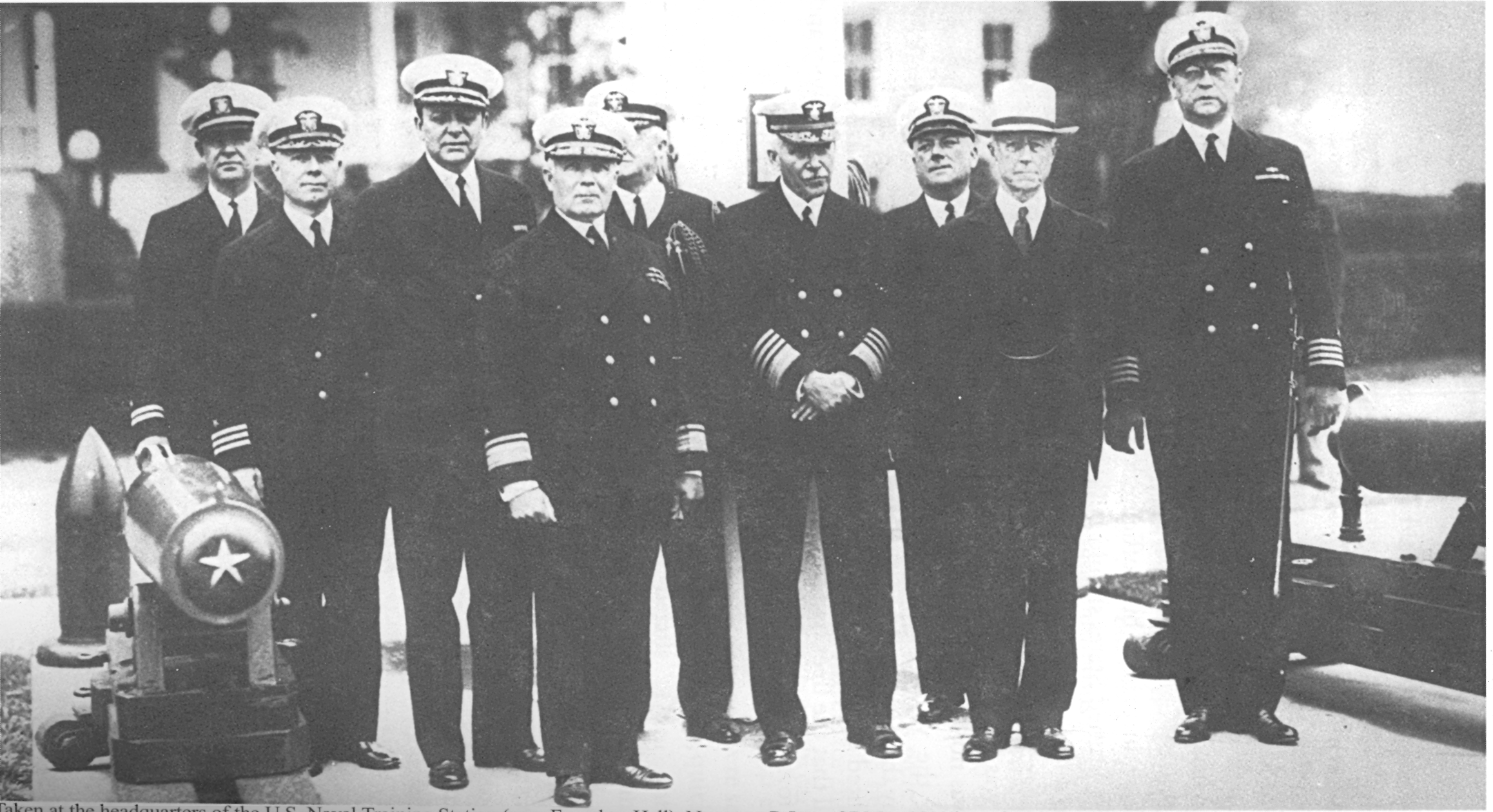
As aide (far left) to Rear Admiral Harris Laning, President of the Naval War College, May 27, 1932

In August 1921, Holloway was assigned to destroyer duty, briefly commanding the destroyer Wainwright before serving as executive officer of the destroyer McCormick until June 1922, when he was promoted to full lieutenant and assigned as executive officer of the destroyer Truxtun for two years of sea duty in the Far East with the Asiatic Fleet. Upon his return to the U.S. in July 1924, he served as an instructor at the Naval Academy in the Department of Ordnance and Gunnery from August 1924 to June 1926, under successive superintendents Henry B. Wilson and Louis M. Nulton.

In 1926, Holloway began a two-year tour aboard the battleship West Virginia, over the course of which he received several departmental commendations for "contribution to gunnery efficiency" and had under his command the highest scoring 16 in (410 mm) gun turret in the Navy, which set a record in target practice that remained unbroken for several years.

From August 1928 to June 1930, Holloway was aide and flag lieutenant on the staff of Rear Admiral Harris Laning, chief of staff of the Battle Fleet and subsequently Commander Battleship Division Two. He remained Laning's aide for the first two years of the admiral's next assignment as President of the Naval War College in Newport, Rhode Island, then had duty as assistant gunnery officer aboard the battleship Nevada from June 1932 – May 1933. In May 1933, he was again assigned as aide and flag lieutenant to now-Vice Admiral Laning, Commander Cruisers Scouting Force. He was promoted to lieutenant commander in June.

In June 1934, Holloway began a year in command of the destroyer Hopkins, flagship of Commander, Destroyer Squadron Three in the Pacific Fleet. "I made a beauty out of the Hopkins. I brought her up in appearance and gunnery. A friend of mine, the first lieutenant of the Langley, helped me. This boy gave me an extra 200 gallons of paint every month. I made her look like a yacht."

Holloway was transferred to the Navy Department in June 1935 for three years of duty with the Gunnery Section of the Fleet Training Division, then was navigator of the battleship Idaho from 1938 until July 1939, when he assumed command of the cargo ship Sirius and was promoted to the rank of full commander.

== World War II ==
In September 1939, Holloway became chief of staff to Rear Admiral Hayne Ellis, commander of the Atlantic Squadron, in which capacity Holloway directed the expansion and deployment of the Atlantic Squadron for Neutrality Patrol operations after the outbreak of World War II in Europe.

In October 1940, Holloway was assigned as officer in charge of the gunnery section of the Fleet Training Office in the office of the Chief of Naval Operations, where he was serving at the time of the Japanese attack on Pearl Harbor. "We were busy as bird-dogs in those weeks following the attack. It's hard to describe just how much the workload moved up. We stopped all routine computation of training and competitive exercises that Fleet Training had been responsible for, and we went into expediting production and perfecting the performance of weapons."

In the weeks following the attack, Holloway was one of three duty officers selected to stand the night watch at the Navy Department, alternating four-hour shifts with Captain Cato D. Glover Jr. and Commander Forrest P. Sherman. "One night, we got a report that there was a dirigible off New York. I put out an emergency on the whole East Coast." The supposed enemy airship turned out to be an off-course American blimp, but Holloway's superiors approved his decision anyway. "After what had happened at Pearl Harbor, we went to general quarters in case of doubt."

=== Operation Torch ===
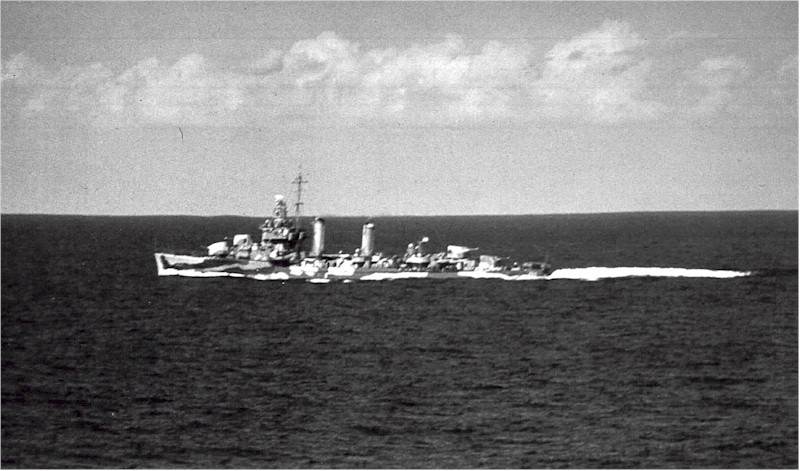
Ellyson, flagship of Destroyer Squadron 10

Holloway had applied for immediate sea duty after the Pearl Harbor attack and on 20 May 1942, he assumed command of Destroyer Squadron Ten (Desron 10), a newly built and newly commissioned member of the Atlantic Fleet. Promoted to captain in June, in November he led Desron 10 in screening the landings at Casablanca during the opening stages of Operation Torch, the Allied invasion of North Africa. As one of three principal destroyer commanders in this operation, he received a Navy Commendation Ribbon with the following citation: "Holloway prevented the many enemy submarines in the area from delivering effective torpedo fire and, by his aggressive fighting spirit and courageous leadership, contributed materially to the winning of a decisive victory over the enemy."

=== DD-DE Shakedown Task Force ===
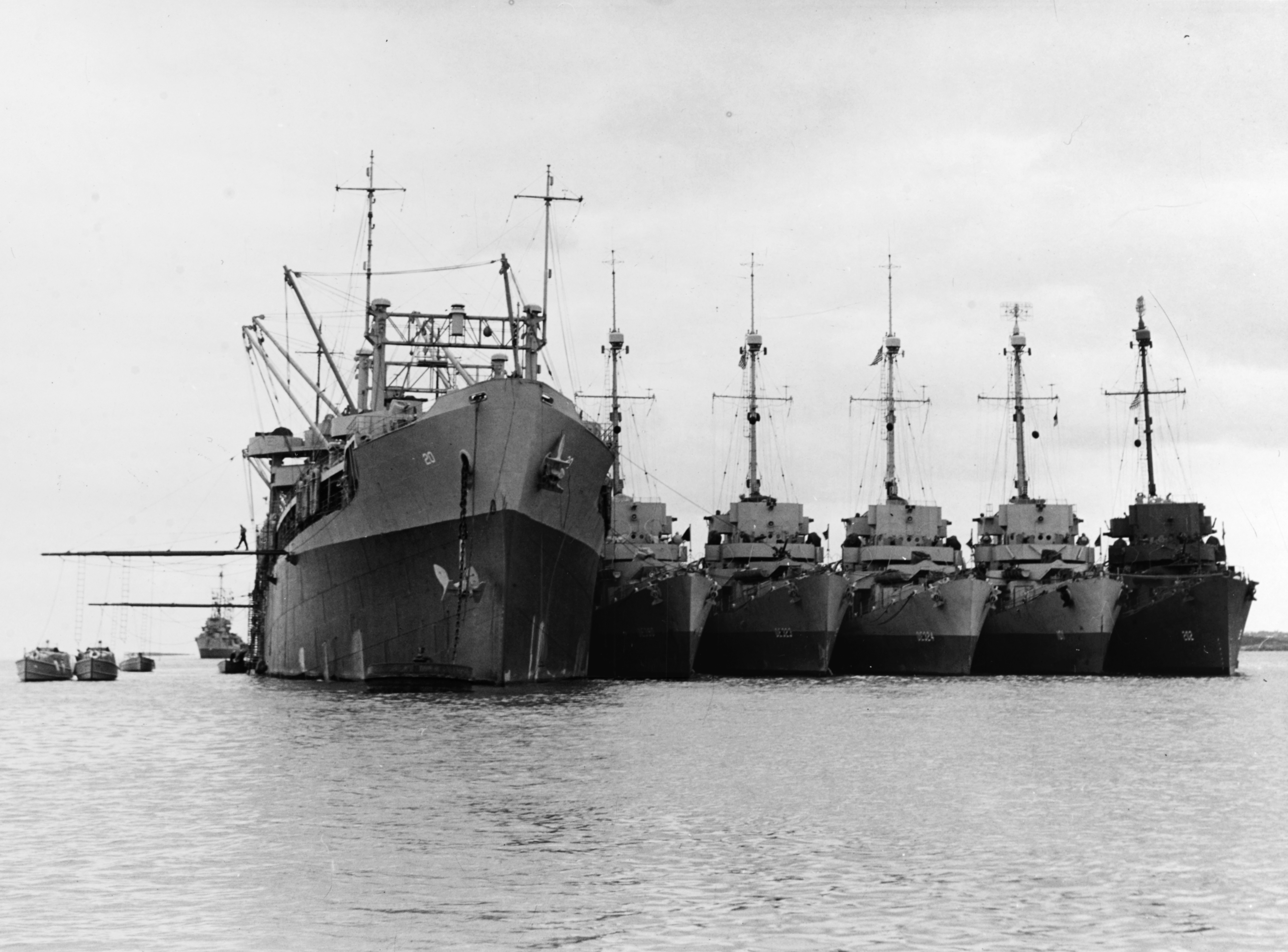
Hamul, flagship of the DD-DE Shakedown Task Force

Having gained a reputation for "unusual capacity for imparting enthusiasm as well as for organization", he was relieved of the command of Desron 10 on 8 April 1943, to lead the new Destroyer and Destroyer Escort (DD-DE) Shakedown Task Force that was being organized at Bermuda to systematically work up newly built destroyers and destroyer escorts before they joined the Atlantic Fleet.

Arriving at Bermuda on 13 April aboard the destroyer tender Hamul, Holloway quickly established an efficient arena for drilling untrained crews in operations at sea. When newly commissioned ships arrived at Bermuda, their officers and men debarked for training aboard Hamul and ashore while their vessels underwent inspection and repair by task force staff. Ships then returned to sea to practice tactics and the use of their equipment, in daylight and in darkness, against towed surface targets and "tame" submarines. Task force staff handled all repairs and logistics, freeing commanding officers to focus solely on training their crews.

At first, Holloway's training program only covered destroyer escorts and a few gunboats, but his "Bermuda college" was so successful that it was expanded in September to encompass all newly built destroyers, and would eventually be extended to Canadian and British vessels as well. By the time of his relief on 14 November, 99 destroyer escorts and 20 destroyers had already graduated from the program and 25 other ships were being trained. The shakedown period had been reduced from six to eight weeks of haphazard preparation to only four weeks for destroyer escorts and five weeks for destroyers, with vastly superior quality of training. For this success, Holloway was awarded the Legion of Merit, whose citation commended his having "built up an efficient organization, turning over to the Fleet competent seagoing vessels and thoroughly indoctrinated personnel. His conspicuous success in fulfilling this important assignment and his skill in collaboration with other commands have contributed vitally to the effective prosecution of the war."

=== Bureau of Naval Personnel ===
Holloway became director of training at the Bureau of Naval Personnel in Washington, D.C., on November 15, 1943, where he earned a second Commendation Ribbon for having "integrated the various programs into one efficient organization with the bureau the center of all policies and procedures. His able directorship and foresight contributed greatly to the successful expansion of the naval training program during this crucial year of war." Holloway's sheer efficiency in this role worked against him when his request for sea duty was rejected by Secretary of the Navy James V. Forrestal, who ruled that Holloway should continue in the training job, "where you are hitting your peak." Forrestal finally relented in late 1944 and released Holloway for duty in the Pacific theater.

=== USS Iowa ===
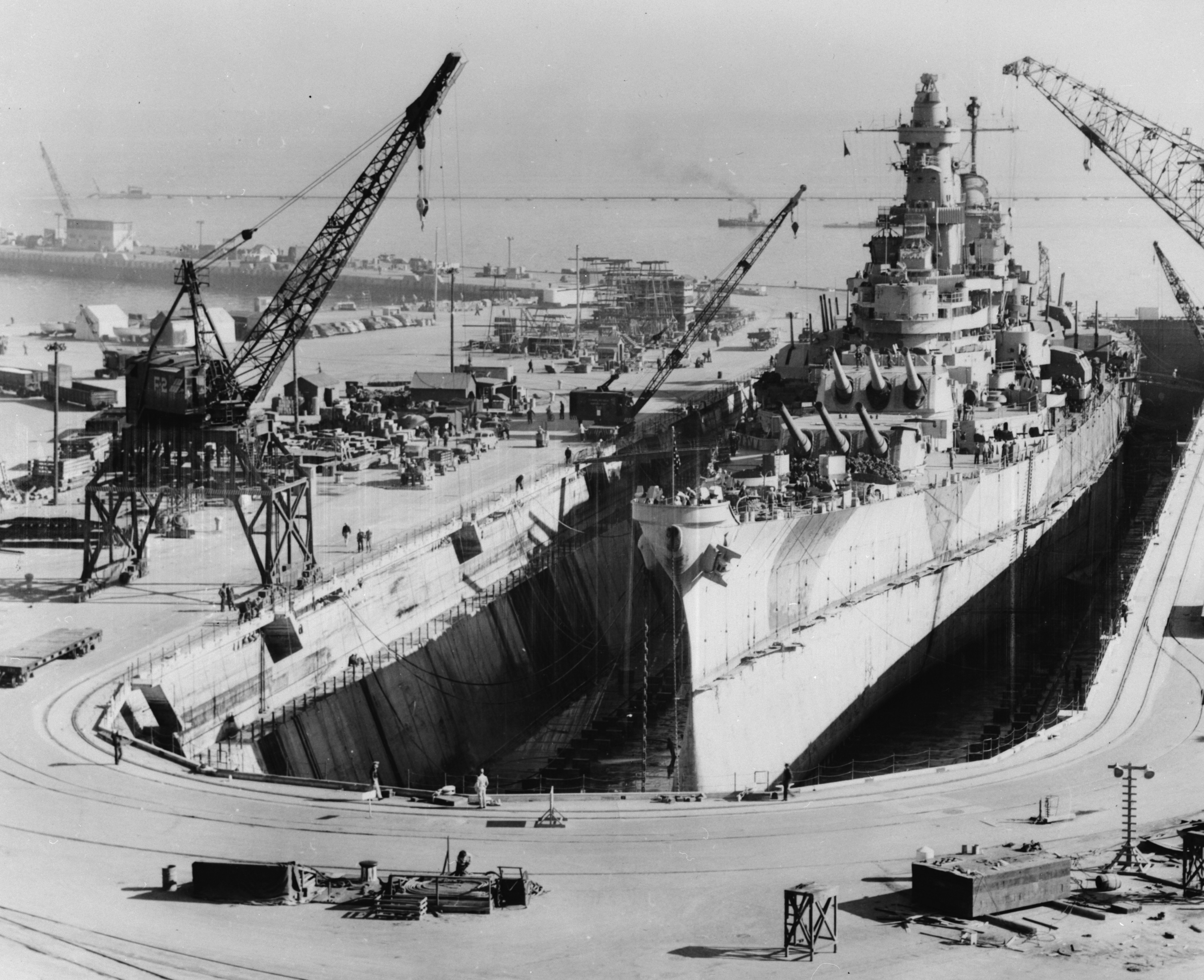
Iowa in drydock, San Francisco, California, 1945

Holloway assumed command of the battleship Iowa, flagship of Battleship Division 7, in November 1944. Under his command, Iowa took part in attacks on Luzon later that month, shooting down many enemy aircraft, and participated in strikes on the Japanese homeland from March to July 1945. For commanding Iowa during these operations, he received a Gold Star in lieu of a second Legion of Merit, with the following citation: "With his vessel operating as flagship of several important striking and covering forces ... Holloway rendered distinguished service throughout the intensive actions and, by his brilliant leadership and outstanding skill, contributed materially to the extensive and costly damage inflicted on the enemy."

Holloway operated his battleship with characteristic flair, recalled Rear Admiral Ralph Kirk James, who had been the maintenance officer responsible for repair work on damaged ships at Manus when Iowa arrived at that base to fix shafting problems on 25 December 1944. "Jimmy Holloway was charging up the harbor with this big battleship, the biggest I'd seen, and I was getting more and more nervous." Alarmed, James warned Holloway to reduce his speed before entering the drydock. "'Oh no,' [Holloway] said ... He got the ship just about halfway into the dry dock when he ordered full speed astern. The Iowa shook like a damned destroyer and stopped just where she was supposed to be." Unfortunately, the backwash from the engine reversal swept away the drydock support blocks from underneath the ship, and James and his crew had to spend an extra three hours resetting the blocks before Iowa could dock. Afterward, James discovered a grey streak in his hair. "I can tell you the moment it was born: when Holloway pulled his high-speed throttle-jockey stunt on me."

Despite being captain of the premier surface vessel in the U.S. Navy, Holloway recognized that naval aviation had become dominant. Soon after assuming command of Iowa, he wrote an urgent letter to his son, Lieutenant James L. Holloway III, who was following in his father's footsteps as a junior officer on a destroyer, to advise the young lieutenant to abandon his promising career in the surface Navy to become a naval aviator as soon as possible. "The war in the Pacific is being won by the carriers. The future of the U.S. Navy lies in naval aviation." Lieutenant Holloway promptly applied for flight training and went on to captain the nuclear aircraft carrier Enterprise, the premier aviation vessel of its era.

=== Demobilization ===
Promoted to rear admiral, Holloway reported as Commander, of Fleet Training Command, Pacific Fleet on 8 August 1945. He was detached from that command less than two months later, on 26 September, to take charge of the Navy's troubled postwar demobilization.

Rear Admiral William M. Fechteler, Assistant Chief of Naval Personnel, informed Holloway that demobilization in the Pacific was "completely chaotic", and ordered Holloway to take charge of the effort with the hastily created title of Assistant Chief of Naval Personnel for Demobilization. Holloway immediately conducted a quick inspection tour of West Coast demobilization centers and concluded that the biggest problem was understaffing at the receiving facilities, which lacked the personnel to process the paperwork for the flood of returning servicemen. To alleviate this bottleneck, Holloway augmented the demobilization center staff with yeomen, disbursing clerks, and anyone else who could read a form. However, after the Pacific returnees had been processed and discharged, they still had to be transported overland from their West Coast debarkation ports to their homes, the vast majority of which were located east of the Rocky Mountains. Holloway deputized subordinate Howard "Red" Yeager as director of rail transportation for the Navy, and Yeager worked with the Association of American Railroads to assemble the necessary rolling stock from scratch. "I think they reached as low as the Toonerville trolley", Holloway recalled.

Under Holloway's immediate direction, the task of demobilizing over three million men was completed by September 1, 1946. He won a Letter of Commendation for his skill as administrator and was officially praised for his skillful direction and supervision of the Navy's personnel demobilization plan.

Holloway resisted pressure from various dignitaries to speed the homecoming of favored constituents. When a member of the United States Senate brought in a friend to ask a favor, Holloway appealed to the senator's better nature: "I look to you, Senator, to help me maintain my probity." Said Holloway later, "No Congressman ever failed to react to such a plea."

== Holloway Plan ==
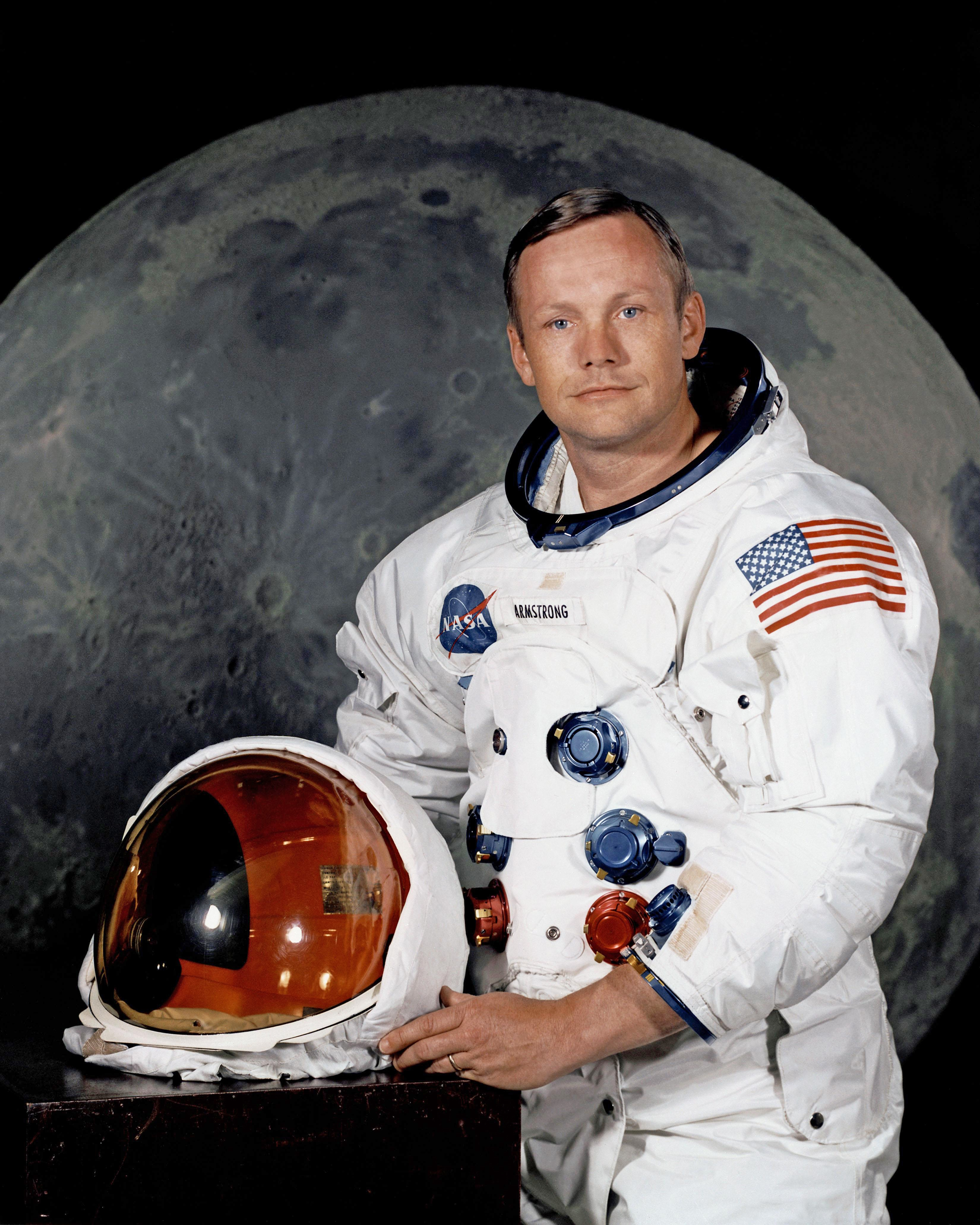
Holloway Plan alumnus Neil Armstrong

While directing the navy's demobilization, Holloway also chaired an influential board that laid the foundation for the postwar Naval Reserve Officer Training Corps (NROTC). Named for its chairman, the Holloway Board was charged with "the development of the proper form, system, and method of education of officers in the postwar United States Navy." Its members included Williams College president James P. Baxter III, Illinois Institute of Technology president Henry T. Heald, Cornell University provost Arthur S. Adams, Rear Admiral Felix L. Johnson, Rear Admiral Stuart H. Ingersoll, Captain Charles D. Wheelock, Captain John P. W. Vest, Commander Charles K. Duncan, and Commander Douglas M. Swift. The report of the Holloway Board became known as the Holloway Plan, and it dramatically expanded the avenues by which officer candidates could enter the regular Navy.

Described as one of the most attractive educational opportunities ever offered, the Holloway Plan broke the Naval Academy's monopoly as a source for naval officers by offering students at fifty-two colleges and universities the same opportunities for a commission in the regular Navy and free education at government expense that was provided to Naval Academy midshipmen, without requiring a hard-to-obtain Congressional appointment. In return for a three-year service commitment, the federal government paid for officer candidates to obtain undergraduate degrees at accredited institutions, commissioning them upon graduation into the Naval Reserve. Unlike previous reservists, NROTC graduates could transfer their commissions into the regular Navy, allowing them to compete on the same basis as Naval Academy graduates. NROTC was intended to provide about half of the Navy's new officers every year, with the other half coming from the Naval Academy. There were two main tracks: the standard four-year course for line officers, and a seven-year Naval Aviation College Program (NACP) for naval aviators.

Submitted to Congress for approval, the Holloway Plan spent the summer of 1946 stagnating as draft legislation in the House Naval Affairs Committee. Finally, with only two months before colleges were scheduled to begin their autumn classes, Holloway made a pilgrimage to the Georgia farm of committee chairman Carl Vinson, and the bill was placed on the House Calendar the following week. It passed by unanimous vote and was signed into law by President Harry S. Truman on August 13, 1946.

During its early years, critics complained that the Holloway Plan was a waste of taxpayer money because many reservists enrolled in the program only for the free college education, and quit the Navy after serving the minimum three-year commitment. Holloway himself anticipated that NROTC graduates would be less committed to a naval career than Naval Academy graduates, given that "The Naval Academy is an undergraduate institution which no man should enter unless he wishes to make the Navy a life career." He was convinced that Annapolis remained the surer but tougher path to a successful Navy career, but argued that the Navy should not risk "putting all our eggs in one basket insofar as methods of initial [officer] procurement are concerned." Annapolis loyalists objected that if NROTC graduates were given the same career opportunities and chances for promotion as Naval Academy graduates, there would be no advantage to attending the Naval Academy and the quality of its midshipmen would plummet because the better officer candidates could opt for an easy commission at a civilian university that lacked the rigor of Naval Academy discipline. A popular Annapolis chant went: "Keep your car, keep your gal, keep your pay—be an officer the 'Holloway'!" Officers in the fleet quipped: "Did you get your commission the hard way or the Holloway?"

Nevertheless, the Holloway Plan quickly became a popular and effective program, and within five years its major features had been copied by the Army and the Air Force. Early Holloway Plan alumni included future astronaut Neil A. Armstrong and future four-star admiral George E. R. Kinnear II.

Forty years later, Holloway's son was responsible for interviewing the eminent lawyers, businessmen, and government officials who applied for membership in the exclusive Metropolitan Club of the City of Washington between 1988 and 1992. "I was truly amazed at the number of these prospective members who asked if I were any relation to the admiral who founded the Holloway Plan," recalled the younger Holloway, by then a famous admiral in his own right. "When I answered yes, they would tell me that they wouldn't be sitting there today if it weren't for the Holloway Plan....It had put them through college—schools like Princeton, Duke University, Caltech, and Stanford. After the Korean War and Vietnam, the opportunities were so great on the outside that many of them left the service and became quite successful in their civilian careers."

=== Superintendent of the U.S. Naval Academy ===
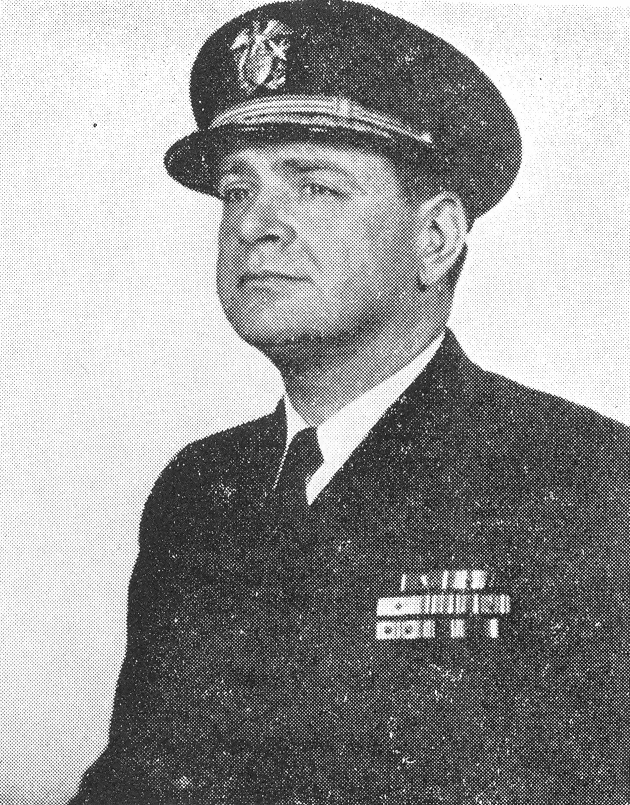
As superintendent of the United States Naval Academy, circa 1947.

On January 15, 1947, Admiral James L. Holloway Jr. became the 35th superintendent of the United States Naval Academy, succeeding Vice Admiral Fitch. At 48, Holloway was the youngest superintendent in fifty years, having been handpicked by Secretary of the Navy Forrestal to implement the academic changes suggested by the Holloway Board, which had recommended that the Naval Academy curriculum move away from rote recitation and continuous crams "to give a stronger emphasis to basic and general education, rendering more fundamental and less detailed instruction in strictly naval material and techniques."

In his first year as superintendent, Holloway revised the curriculum to promote a balanced program of mutually supporting courses, including a newly expanded leadership course on human relations problems, for which half of the textbook was written by psychology experts from Johns Hopkins University and the other half by Holloway himself. He also procured modern equipment for the ordnance, gunnery, and marine engineering departments and instituted annual faculty symposia to "explore and confirm methods employed in both education and training." Midshipmen were thoroughly indoctrinated "in all aspects of naval aviation" as a graduation requirement.

To compensate for the increased academic expectations, Holloway loosened the regulations restricting midshipman activities, allowing first classmen to own cars, go on leave every other weekend, store civilian clothing in dormitory rooms, and stay up until 11:00 PM every night. Some of these liberties were later revoked by Holloway's successor, Vice Admiral Harry W. Hill. The first class was also delegated greater responsibility for student governance, and attempted to purge "flagrant violations of mature personal dignity" from midshipman hazing rituals, with mixed success.

Despite his energetic reforms and personal popularity among the midshipmen, Holloway's three-year tour as superintendent ultimately was too brief to reverse the Naval Academy's entrenched cultural bias against academic achievement. A more durable legacy was the series of yawl races Holloway initiated to promote seamanship and competitive sailing, dubbed the Holloway trophy races after the award for the winning midshipman skipper. Holloway also addressed the dismal living conditions of the enlisted men based at the Academy by upgrading their quarters from trailer parks to a village of Wherry housing units on the north shore of the Severn River. He declared that a midshipman's first lesson must be a concern for enlisted men's welfare and that Annapolis of all places must set the example.

=== Educational unification ===
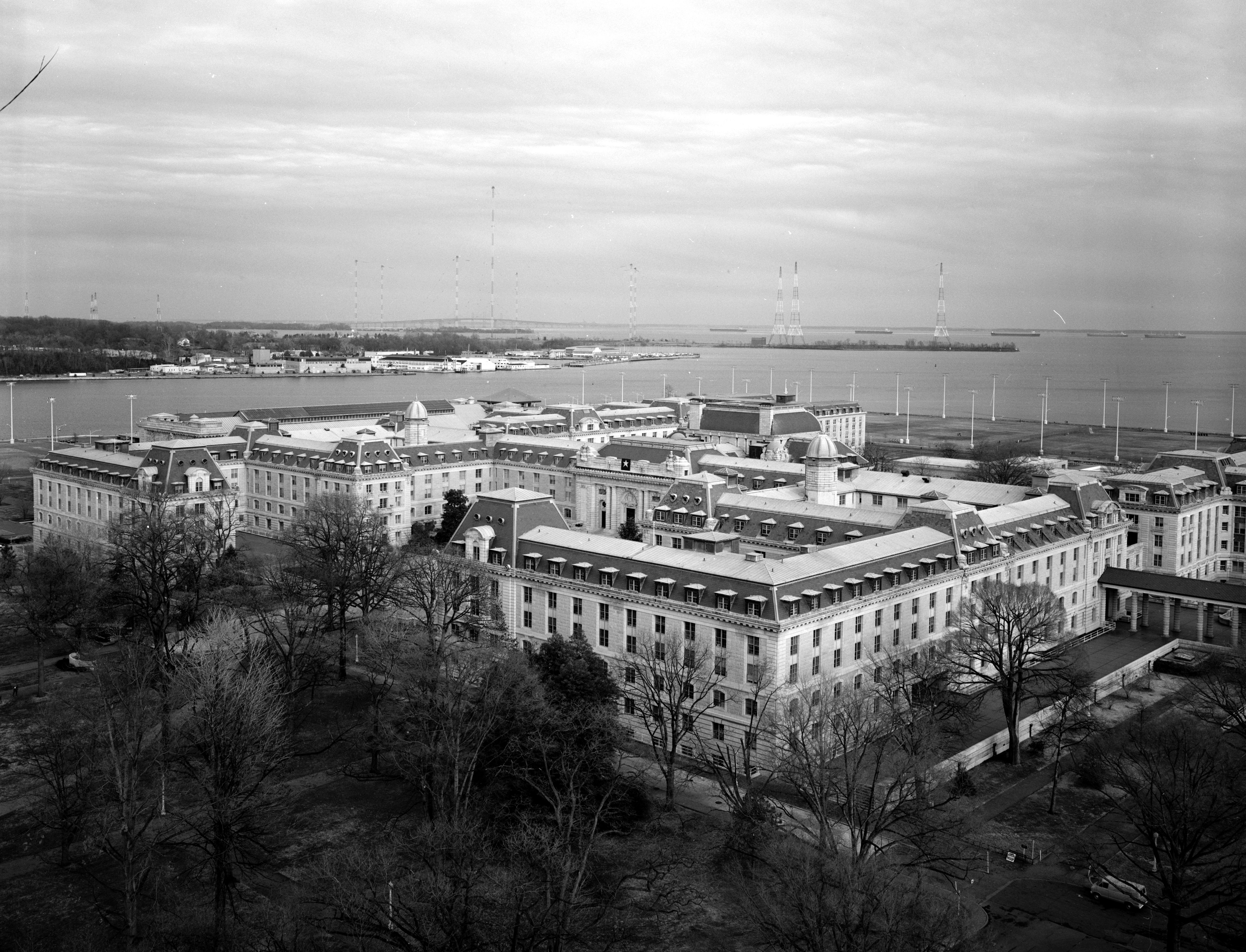
Bancroft Hall, United States Naval Academy, Annapolis, Maryland.

Throughout his career, Holloway vigorously defended the Naval Academy's special role as the preeminent source of naval officers in the U.S.

As chairman of the Holloway Board, Holloway helped fend off proposals to downgrade the importance of Annapolis by converting the Academy into a two-year postgraduate school for students who had already completed at least three years of college, a plan that would double the number of officers that could be produced by halving the time spent at the Academy. The Holloway Board also rejected another proposal, popular among local politicians, to expand enrollment by establishing satellite Naval Academies in other coastal cities. "It was deemed wiser that the Naval Academy at Annapolis, with its history and traditions, be the single institution representing...the ultimate in personal and professional standards, and a principal binding force...in the Navy as a whole."

In January 1947, less than two weeks after becoming Academy superintendent, Holloway rebuffed a proposal by Army Chief of Staff Dwight D. Eisenhower to essentially unify the Naval Academy with the United States Military Academy at West Point. Eisenhower believed the curricula of West Point and Annapolis should be as close to identical as possible and proposed a full-scale exchange program in which West Point cadets and Annapolis midshipmen would each spend their third year at the other service's academy. Holloway's bluntly phrased rejection drove a furious Eisenhower to complain to Chief of Naval Operations Chester W. Nimitz that Holloway considered his idea "the ultimate in ridiculousness." Colonel and President of Georgia Tech Blake R Van Leer later defended Holloway's plans for training and education for naval officers. President Harry S. Truman and Holloway would later appoint Van Leer to the visitor board and have him assist with creating programs and advising on the curriculum.

In March 1949, Holloway was the junior member of the Stearns-Eisenhower Board, convened to consider the topic of educational unification among the services. Chaired by University of Colorado president Robert Stearns, the board was initially inclined to recommend that officer candidates from all services study the same core academic curriculum at a single unified academy, as favored by the new Secretary of Defense, Louis Johnson, with Annapolis and West Point being reduced to specialized training campuses. To everyone's surprise, Holloway persuaded the other members to adopt the diametrically opposite recommendation that the existing service academy system be not only preserved but expanded by adding a new service academy for the Air Force.

In 1954, Holloway's loyalty to the Naval Academy landed him in professional trouble for the only time in his career. Testifying before a congressional committee in favor of the proposed creation of the United States Air Force Academy, Holloway declared that he was sick and tired of sending Naval Academy graduates to the Air Force and admitted that he did everything possible to prevent such "desertions." Called to account by an infuriated Deputy Secretary of Defense Roger M. Kyes, Holloway stood by his words. "What's wrong with that?" he demanded. "We don't want our boys going to the Air Force. We teach them things we don't want used against us later."

== Chief of Naval Personnel ==
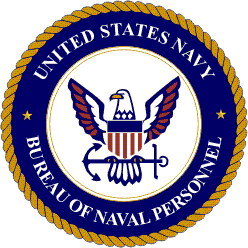
Bureau of Naval Personnel seal.

After completing his tour as superintendent in 1950, Holloway served 30 months as Commander, Battleship-Cruiser Force, Atlantic (COMBATCRULANT) before being promoted to vice admiral on February 2, 1953, and appointed chief of the Bureau of Naval Personnel (BuPers). He served as Chief of Naval Personnel from 1953 to 1957, longer than any other BuPers chief in 75 years. Charged by statute with the selection and assignment of all naval personnel, his hiring philosophy was, "We should get the best people we can for these jobs and make them play over their heads."

As Chief of Naval Personnel, Holloway managed a variety of personnel issues arising from the end of the Korean War, such as promotions for returned prisoners of war and improvement of housing facilities, as well as the desegregation of the Navy. He abolished the policy of separate recruitment of black and white sailors that had tended to channel white recruits into mainstream branches but relegate black recruits to menial commissary and steward functions.

"Keeps a taut ship," remarked contemporaries at the Pentagon, but also "keeps a tight lip," despite a reputation for florid speech and unusually lengthy prepared statements before Congressional committees. For example, when asked by a House Appropriations subcommittee whether it was Navy policy to promote personnel on discharge even if they had been discharged because of Communist affiliations, a charge Senator Joseph R. McCarthy had leveled against the Army, Holloway replied, "It is not. I am not saying that in criticism of anyone else...Sometimes, in the best of families, the right hand does not know what the left hand doeth. But it is certainly not the policy in the Navy, and it is one we abjure."

=== Hyman G. Rickover ===
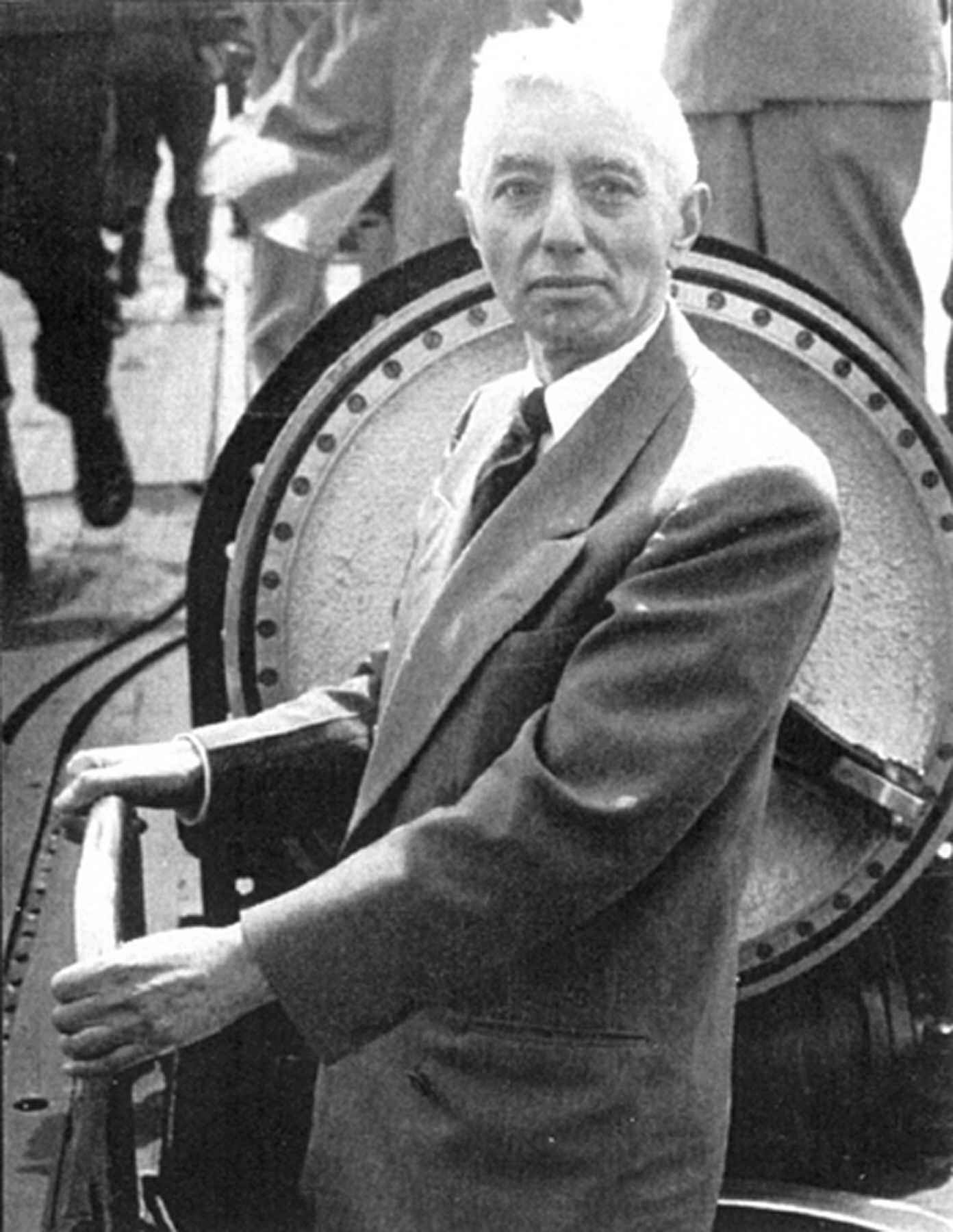
Rear Admiral Hyman G. Rickover

Holloway was an early ally of Rear Admiral Hyman G. Rickover, the controversial father of the Navy's nuclear propulsion program. To induce promising line officers to submit to the rigors of nuclear training, Rickover insisted that only nuclear-qualified officers be allowed to command a nuclear vessel. Holloway agreed with Rickover's concept and allowed Rickover to screen the candidate pool from which BuPers would select officers for nuclear training. Rickover retained this absolute control over nuclear candidate selection until his retirement in 1982.

In June 1953, Rickover faced mandatory retirement after being passed over by the rear admiral selection board, and Holloway was one of the few flag officers to push for his promotion.

Well, they passed him over, and there was a hell of a roar on the Hill. I talked to [Senator] Henry Jackson, whom I know very well, and he said, "Admiral, I know he's probably obnoxious to a lot of people, but that fellow's got a following." And I said, "I ... agree with you." So I went to Bob Anderson, the Secretary of the Navy, and I said, "There is machinery in the law which is very strict about the promotion and the Secretary can't dictate, but there is a way that you can write in a precept a certain qualification that you want, and we can write it so strongly that they can't accept anybody but Rickover." So I wrote a precept for a board of six line [officers] and three EDOs and ... tied it up so that the qualification was such that only Rickover could qualify.

Rickover was promoted to rear admiral by the next selection board in July. "This is the end of the selection system," mourned one of Holloway's friends. "No, it isn't," Holloway replied. "It isn't the end...because we've used a law to promote him...to make the will of the Secretary felt. When we're too hidebound and reactionary, there's room in the law for the Secretary to get his way. If you don't do that, you'd have a special law in Congress which would really be the end of the selection system." Only a couple of weeks later, Congress proved Holloway's point by attaching a provision to the annual defense appropriations bill that promoted Brigadier General Robert S. Moore to major general, after the Army had refused to advance him through the normal system. "This sort of thing is what we must guard against," complained General Herbert B. Powell, Holloway's counterpart in the personnel section of the Army staff at the time. "We must follow the system set up and prescribed by law.”

== Commander in Chief, U.S. Naval Forces, Eastern Atlantic and Mediterranean ==
On October 26, 1957, President Dwight D. Eisenhower named Holloway to succeed Admiral Walter F. Boone as Commander in Chief, U.S. Naval Forces, Eastern Atlantic and Mediterranean (CINCNELM), Holloway assumed command in November 1957, and was promoted to full admiral on January 1, 1958. with additional duty as Commander, Subordinate Command U.S. Atlantic Fleet (COMSCOMLANTFLT), and later as U.S. Commander Eastern Atlantic (USCOMEASTLANT). As CINCNELM, Holloway commanded all U.S. naval forces in Europe, including the Sixth Fleet commanded by Vice Admiral Charles R. Brown.

In November 1957, the Joint Chiefs of Staff instructed Holloway to establish a specified command, the first in Eisenhower's defense reorganization program. In the event of an emergency in the Middle East, he was to transfer his flag from London to the Mediterranean as Commander in Chief, Specified Command, Middle East (CINCSPECOMME).

=== Lebanon crisis of 1958 ===
On July 14, 1958, the Hashemite dynasty in Iraq was overthrown by a military coup d'état. Fearing that he would be next, Lebanese president Camille Chamoun appealed for American military aid within 48 hours to settle domestic unrest in his own country, invoking the Eisenhower Doctrine, which stated that the United States would intervene upon request to stabilize countries threatened by international communism. Holloway, who happened to be serving on a Selection Board in Washington at the time, promptly met with Chief of Naval Operations Arleigh A. Burke, who warned that a deployment order was imminent but that commitments in East Asia precluded any reinforcements from the Seventh Fleet. Retorted Holloway, "I don't need any help. I can take over all of the Lebanon if you say the word." As one of Burke's few remaining peers in the Navy, Holloway took the opportunity to tease the CNO. "But I've already had another proposition....From some Britisher. He thinks, if there's action, I should go up and take the port of Tripoli to protect their oil installations there." The famously mercurial Burke cursed him out.

At 6:23 p.m. on July 14, President Eisenhower ordered that the American intervention force begin to arrive at Beirut by 9:00 a.m. on July 15, when he planned to announce the intervention on national television. Burke relayed the order to Holloway at 6:30 p.m., adding, "Join your flagship now. Sail all Sixth Fleet eastward." Holloway had been given less than fifteen hours to establish a beachhead. He immediately flew back to his London headquarters, where he stopped just long enough to assemble his staff and activate Operation Bluebat, a preplanned scenario for suppressing a coup d'état in Lebanon, before flying on to Beirut.

On July 15, only four minutes behind schedule, the first wave of Marines landed on a tourist beach near Beirut. In one of the most colorful episodes in Marine Corps history, a delighted crowd of curious spectators and bikini-clad sunbathers waved and cheered as a battalion of Marines waded ashore in full battle gear and stormed the beach. Soft drink vendors and ice cream carts appeared playing nickelodeon music while small boys swam out to the landing craft and offered to help the Marines carry their equipment. After herding the civilians out of the way, the Marines secured the landing site and seized Beirut International Airport. Holloway flew into the airport from London at 4:00 a.m. on July 16 and boarded his flagship Taconic in time to supervise the next wave of landings, which he summarized for Burke in one word: "Flawless."

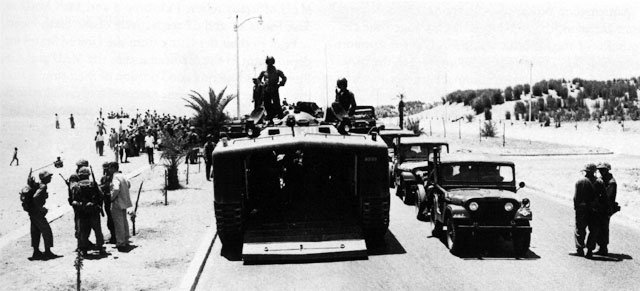
U.S. Marines moving into Beirut, July 16, 1958.

At 10:30 a.m. on July 16, as the Marines prepared to move into Beirut, it was discovered that Lebanese Army tanks had blocked the road from the airport, with orders to prevent the Marines from entering the city. Holloway raced to the scene, arriving at the roadblock at the same time as the American ambassador to Lebanon, Robert M. McClintock, and the general in chief of the Lebanese Army, General Fuad Chehab. Adjourning to a nearby schoolhouse for an impromptu conference, they devised a compromise whereby the Lebanese Army would escort the Marines into the city. Holloway insisted that they start moving right away, "tootey-sweetey".

This done, [the Marine] battalion moved out once more, but this time with Lebanese jeeps at intervals in the American column, the whole being led by two official cars containing the American ambassador to Lebanon, the general in chief of the Lebanese Army, the American task force commander, the commander of the Fast Carrier Strike Force, and the commander of the Marine task force. It was one of the more unusual politico-military processions in American history, and its progress marked the passing of the crisis of the American intervention in Lebanon.

"We were really sitting on a powder keg," Holloway said later, "but fortunately there were no incidents. We just got in a car—Ambassador McClintock and I—and led the column straight through." Once the column entered the city, Chehab departed and Holloway "assumed personal tactical command," directing individual units to their respective billeting areas in the city—"my first and last experience in field officer grade with land forces."

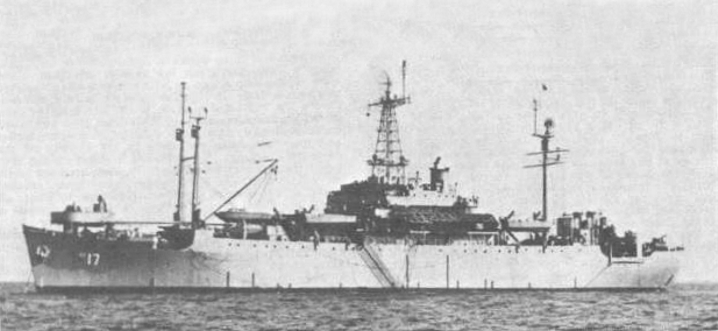
Taconic, Holloway's flagship at Beirut.

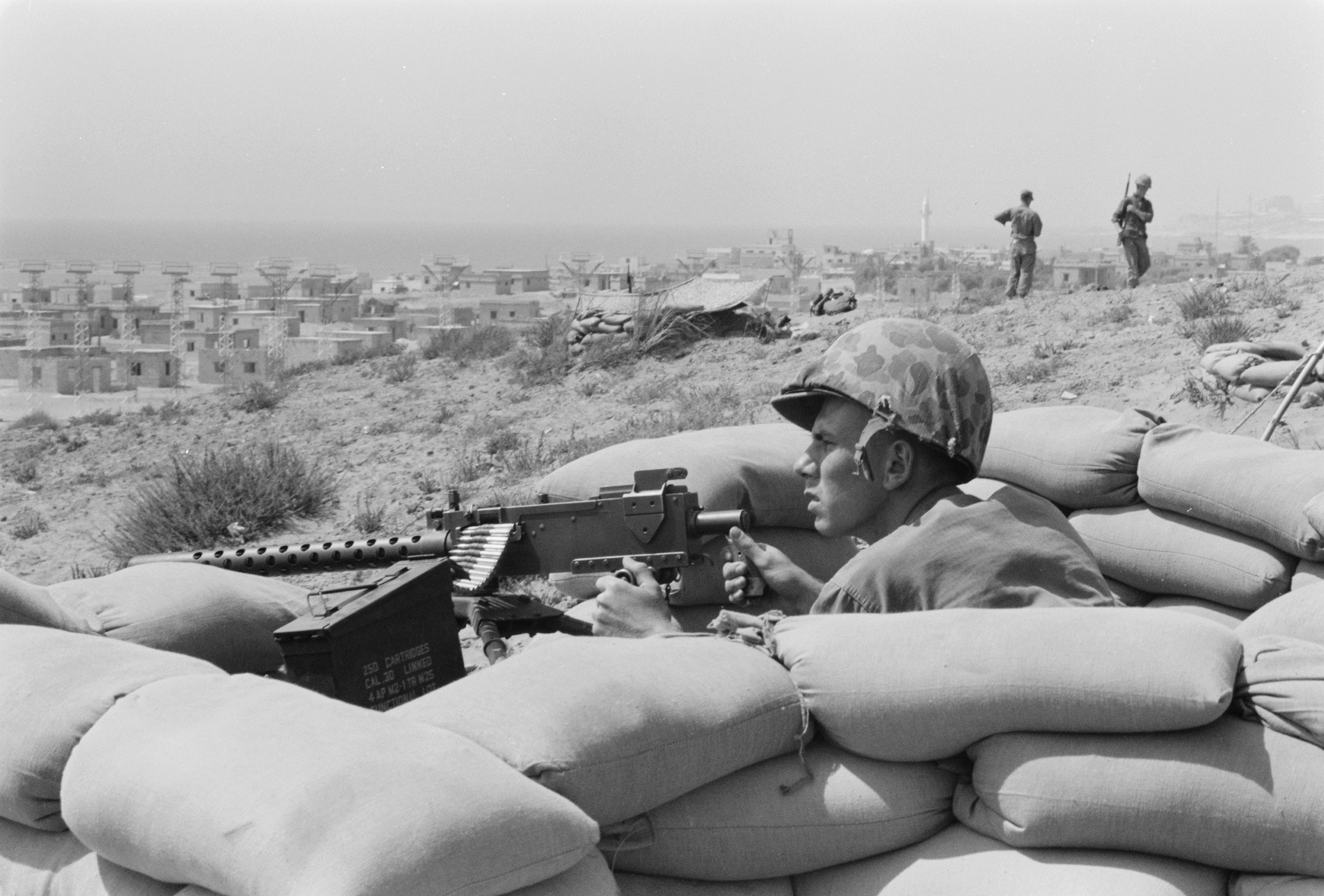
U.S. Marine in a foxhole overlooking Beirut, July 1958.

On July 17, Deputy Under Secretary of State Robert D. Murphy arrived in Beirut as President Eisenhower's personal representative, charged with resolving the political situation. Conferring daily with Holloway, Murphy quickly concluded that the decision to intervene had been based on faulty assumptions. "We agreed that much of the conflict concerned personalities and rivalries of a domestic nature, with no relation to international issues." In particular, Holloway and Murphy felt that the insurrection had nothing to do with international communism and that Chamoun's presidency was doomed for purely domestic reasons. Murphy decided that the only solution was to elect a new president who would ask that the American forces be removed as soon as possible. He brokered a deal between the dissident factions to allow a new presidential election, which General Chehab won on July 31.

With the Lebanese government nominally stabilized, Holloway was directed on August 5 to begin planning a withdrawal schedule, which he submitted for approval on August 11. The first Marine battalion began reembarking immediately. United Nations diplomat Rajeshwar Dayal observed the Marines' departure, "a process which seemed more difficult of accomplishment than the landing. It was evident that the gallant Admiral Holloway, sceptical from the start about the wisdom of the whole exercise, felt an infinite sense of relief at the prospect of an early departure." President Chehab took office on September 23 and a unity government was formed on October 23. The last American troops left Lebanon two days later.

In the end, Operation Bluebat sent nearly 15,000 American troops to Lebanon from commands in Europe and the continental United States, including 6,100 Marines and 3,100 Army airborne troops armed with nuclear artillery; the 76 ships of the Sixth Fleet; and a 200-plane Composite Air Task Force based out of Incirlik Air Base, Turkey. The intervention forces remained in Lebanon for 102 days, at a cost of over $200 million, acting as an urban security force and losing only one American soldier to hostile fire.

Holloway professed satisfaction with the near-perfect outcome. "The proof of the pudding is in the eating. The operation would appear to stand as an unqualified success." Nevertheless, Operation Bluebat came to be viewed as a case study in how not to plan an operation. According to one history, "Virtually every official report opens with the caveat that had Operation Bluebat been opposed, disasters would have occurred, and argues that problems encountered during the operation's course could have been solved well before the order to execute was given."

Holloway inadvertently created one of these problems himself when he ordered Major General David W. Gray to establish an Army base in a large olive grove just east of the airport. Said Gray, "I asked, 'Isn't that private property? Whom should I see about it?' I shall never forget [Holloway's] answer. Waving his arms in characteristic fashion, he replied, 'Matter of military necessity. Send the bills to the Ambassador.' Of course, it didn't work out exactly that way...." It turned out that the olive grove was the largest in Lebanon and vital to the local economy, but the Lebanese women who harvested the olives refused to enter the grove while American troops were present, risking the loss of the entire crop and severe unemployment. Holloway wryly observed that when his forces finally departed, they left behind a constitutionally elected president, a united army, peace in the area, and "a few legal beagles to pay for damage to the olive groves."

Holloway's superiors on the Joint Chiefs of Staff (JCS) introduced complications of their own, recalled Gray. "One day I walked in on Admiral Holloway to find him sputtering. He said, 'Do you know what I just told the JCS? I am sixty-years old, I have thirty-five years of service, I have a physical infirmity that will allow me to retire tomorrow, and I will do it if you don't leave me alone and let me do my job.'"

== Retirement ==
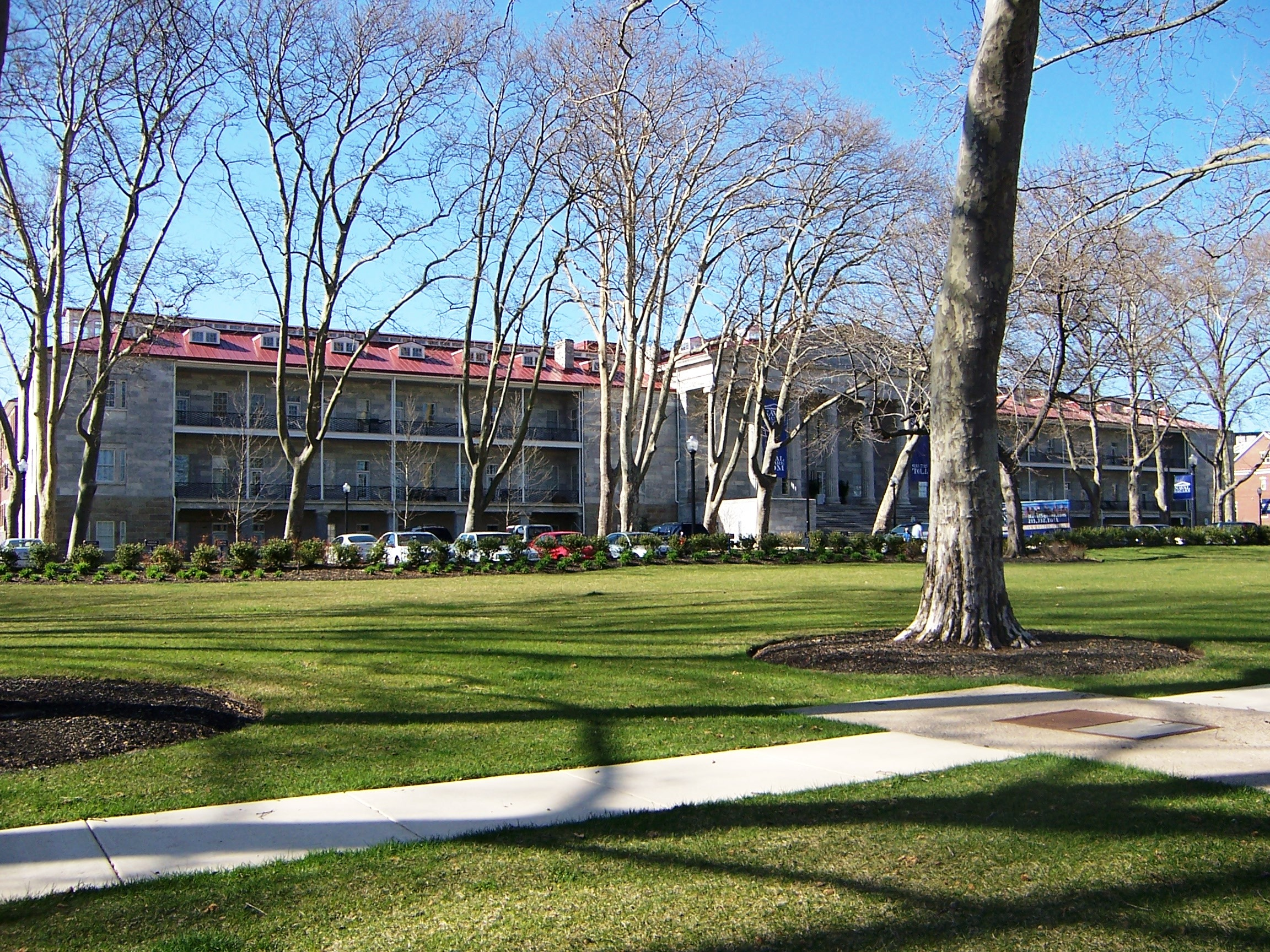
United States Naval Home, Philadelphia, Pennsylvania

Holloway was relieved as CINCNELM by Admiral Robert L. Dennison in March 1959. Returning to Washington for his well-attended retirement ceremony a month later, Holloway declared that he definitely would not follow the example of other high-ranking military retirees in that he was actually going to retire, not start a second career in business. After his retirement from the Navy, he served as Governor of the United States Naval Home in Philadelphia, Pennsylvania, from 1964 until 1966.

In later life, he moved to Carl Vinson Hall, a Navy retirement home in McLean, Virginia. He died on January 11, 1984, of an aortic aneurysm at Fairfax Hospital in Falls Church, Virginia.

== Personal life ==
Holloway was a husky, round-faced man with blue eyes and brown hair who stood six feet tall, weighed 190 pounds, and spoke in a light southern drawl. He was nicknamed "Lord Jim", as much for his reputation as a strict disciplinarian as for the aristocratic affectations that Time dubbed "a suave, diplomatic air that sometimes spills over into pomposity":

In civvies he sports a Malacca cane. He is something of a connoisseur of wines. He interlards his conversation with phrases out of Dickens or Thackeray, loves to write what he calls "erudite letters" (favorite word: vouchsafe). "If he will ever be known for any command, it will be for his command of the English language," said one officer who served on his staff, and Holloway adds to the impression when he tells his officers, in a neo-British accent, to "go bird-dog this thing," or "go with the speed of a deer and do it," or "let's get our tails over the dashboard on this thing." His Navy nickname is "Gentleman Jim." His press nickname is "Lord Jim." His private Navy nickname is "Lord Plushbottom."

United Nations diplomat Rajeshwar Dayal described Holloway as "a gentleman to the core" during his interactions with the United Nations Observation Group in Lebanon (UNOGIL) in 1958. "He was a man of impressive presence and courtly ways and fully deserved his sobriquet of 'Lord Jim'. ... We found him a charming and engaging personality and a man of his word." Major General David W. Gray, who commanded the Army contingent during the initial stages of the Lebanon intervention, recalled:

My first meeting with Adm. James Holloway was some experience. I had asked to brief him on our plan for Jordan and was shown to his office. He was reclining on a sofa and remained that way throughout the session. When I would make a particular point, he would exclaim, 'Atta boy,' or 'That's it. Give'm hell'—a one-man cheering section, so to speak. It was quite the most incredible briefing I ever gave. I learned later that he suffered from some ailment at the time, which required him to take these rest sessions. He impressed me as a 'big picture' type, not too interested in details, but I left his office feeling that here was a man for whom you would make that extra effort and take that extra step.

Holloway was widely admired within the Navy, although he was identified so strongly as being a deskbound staff officer that when he assumed operational command of Operation Bluebat in 1958, other officers joked, "Oh, he's finally gone to sea." Los Angeles Times columnist Bill Henry observed, "When President Eisenhower announced that our leader of United States forces in the Middle East would be an officer named Adm. Holloway, there was a sort of 'Who dat?' reaction. James Lemuel Holloway Jr. has not been a dashing, spectacular figure. He has, however, compiled a steady record of uncanny ability as an organizer which has overshadowed a fine combat record in two world wars."

While chief of the Bureau of Personnel, Holloway summarized his philosophy to a group of young naval officers: "You men probably do not think of it in this way, but I do. To be commissioned in the Navy, you had to be appointed by the President with the approval of Congress. This is the procedure and requirement for the seating of a Supreme Court judge or an ambassador. This is why a naval officer must have his chin out at all times." Admiral Elmo R. Zumwalt Jr., a lieutenant commander in BuPers from 1953 to 1955, remembered Holloway as "the superior who most impressed me when I was a young officer."

=== Family ===
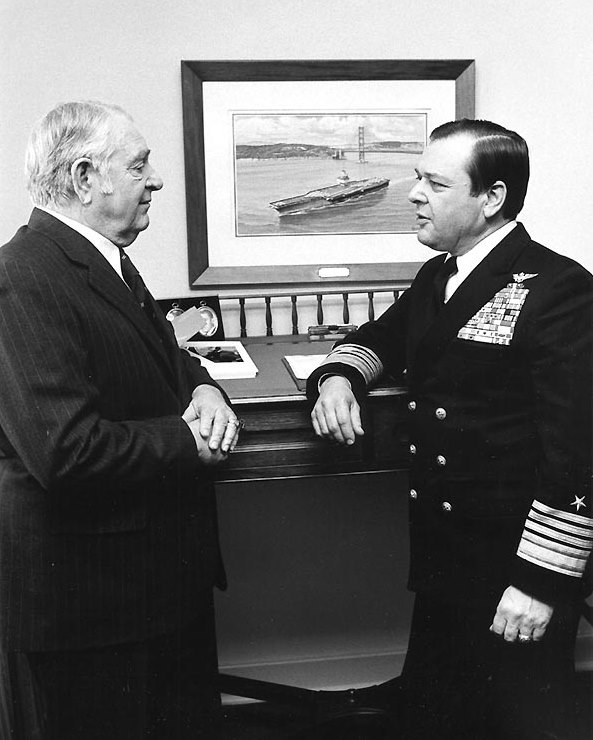
Retired (left), with his son, Chief of Naval Operations James L. Holloway III, 1974

Holloway married the former Jean Gordon Hagood, daughter of U.S. Army Major General Johnson Hagood, of Charleston, South Carolina, on May 11, 1921. They had two children: son James Lemuel Holloway III, who also attained the rank of four-star admiral as Chief of Naval Operations from 1974 to 1978; and daughter Jean Gordon Holloway, whose husband, Rear Admiral Lawrence Heyworth Jr., was the first commanding officer of the aircraft carrier America and briefly served as the 45th superintendent of the U.S. Naval Academy.

Holloway's wife Jean died of cancer in October 1956 after a three-year illness. After her death, he remarried to the former Josephine Cook Kenny, widow of a Navy captain who had served with him in BuPers, on January 16, 1958. Stepdaughter Josephine Cook Fraser married Mercury Seven astronaut Walter M. Schirra Jr.

Holloway's father, James Lemuel Holloway Sr., served as superintendent of schools in Fort Smith, Arkansas, before entering Washington University School of Medicine in 1900 for training in osteopathy, which he practiced in Dallas, Texas, for forty years. In 1952, at the age of 92, Holloway Sr. wrote to the chairman of the Joint Chiefs of Staff to inquire whether Holloway Jr. was falling short in his performance of duty as a rear admiral such that he might not be promoted to vice admiral; if so, he wanted to give his son some helpful advice. President Harry S. Truman wrote back to assure the worried father that his son was not neglecting his duties.

In 1960, Holloway Sr. celebrated his centennial in Dallas, having seen his son achieve the rank of four-star admiral. Fourteen years later, Holloway Jr. would see his own son achieve the same rank when Holloway III was sworn in as Chief of Naval Operations in 1974. (James Lemuel Holloway IV, son of Holloway III, died in a car accident in 1964.)

As of 2008, Holloway Jr. and Holloway III remain the only father and son to both serve as four-star admirals in the U.S. Navy while on active duty; the other two four-star admirals who fathered four-star sons were either promoted to that rank posthumously, in the case of Admiral John S. McCain Sr., or upon retirement, in the case of Admiral David W. Bagley.

In his memoirs, Holloway III complained that "there has often been a tacit presumption that my father was in a position to advance my career as I gained seniority in the Navy. On the contrary, as a retired officer he had little or no influence over his own future, much less mine." As an example of this presumption, when President Richard M. Nixon approved Holloway III's nomination to succeed Admiral Elmo R. Zumwalt Jr. as Chief of Naval Operations, Zumwalt believed that Nixon acquiesced mainly to avoid overruling the recommendation of his secretary of defense, but that, "In addition, and I really think this was a factor, Mr. Nixon remembered Jimmy's father from his own period of naval service."

=== Awards ===
Holloway's decorations included the Legion of Merit, awarded for organizing the DD-DE Shakedown Task Force of the Atlantic Fleet operational training command, with Gold Star in lieu of a second award for commanding the battleship Iowa in the Pacific theater; the Navy Commendation Ribbon, awarded for leading Destroyer Squadron 10 during the landings at Casablanca, with star in lieu of a second ribbon for serving as director of training in the Bureau of Naval Personnel; the Victory Medal with Destroyer Clasp; the American Defense Service Medal with Fleet Clasp; the American Campaign Medal; the European-African-Middle Eastern Campaign Medal with star; the Asiatic-Pacific Campaign Medal with stars; the World War II Victory Medal; and the Philippine Liberation Medal. He was appointed Grand Officer of the Order of Leopold by the government of Belgium.

Holloway received the honorary degrees of Doctor of Laws from Muhlenberg College in 1944, and later from the University of Notre Dame; and Doctor of Humane Letters from Villanova College in 1948.

The Admiral James L. Holloway Jr. Award is presented annually by the Navy League of the United States to the outstanding NROTC midshipman in the nation and consists of an engraved watch and a certificate. The RADM James L. Holloway Jr. Trophy honors the Naval Academy midshipman who has contributed the most to Varsity Offshore J/24 sailing through his leadership, dedication to the team, and sailing skills.

Holloway recorded an oral history that is archived at the Columbia University Oral History Research Office.

=== Dates of rank ===
- Midshipman – 1915 (class rank 149/199)
- Ensign – June 7, 1918
- Lieutenant, Junior Grade – September 21, 1918
- Lieutenant – June 3, 1922
- Lieutenant Commander – June 30, 1933
- Commander – July 1, 1939
- Captain – June 17, 1942
- Rear Admiral – September 4, 1945
- Vice Admiral – February 2, 1953
- Admiral – January 1, 1958

== External resources ==
- James L. Holloway Papers at Syracuse University
- TIME Magazine cover, August 4, 1958
- United States Naval Aviation: The Brown Shoes Project – The Holloway Plan
- McClintock, Robert (October 1962), "The American Landing in Lebanon", U.S. Naval Institute Proceedings, pp. 64–79 (includes photo of Holloway and Ambassador McClintock negotiating with General Chehab at the roadblock near Beirut)

Military offices
Preceded by Walter F. Boone	Commander in Chief, United States Naval Forces, Eastern Atlantic and Mediterranean; November 1957 – March 1959	Succeeded by Robert L. Dennison
Academic offices
Preceded by Aubrey W. Fitch	Superintendent of the United States Naval Academy; January 15, 1947–1950	Succeeded by Harry W. Hill
