= Admiral Boone =

Admiral Boone may refer to:

- Joel Thompson Boone (1889–1974), U.S. Navy vice admiral
- Walter F. Boone (1898–1995), U.S. Navy admiral

== See also ==
- Thomas Boone (character), fictional U.S. Navy rear admiral in the TV series, JAG
