= Robert Scurlark Moore =

United States Army general

- Nickname: Bobby
- Born: September 8, 1895; Paris, Texas
- Died: January 27, 1978 (aged 82) Washington, D.C.
- Allegiance: United States
- Branch: United States Army
- Service years: 1917–1968
- Rank: Major general
- Conflicts: World War I World War II
- Awards: Distinguished Service Medal; Legion of Merit; Purple Heart

Robert Scurlark Moore (September 5, 1895 – January 27, 1978) was a major general in the United States Army Finance Corps who served as a military liaison officer to the Senate and House Appropriations Committees for nearly three decades. When the Army refused to make him a general officer, Congress twice used appropriations bills to promote him anyway.

== Career ==
Moore was born in Paris, Texas on September 8, 1895, to Robert Scurlark Moore and Estelle (Lanier) Moore, and grew up in Ada, Oklahoma. He received a teaching certificate from East Central State Normal School in 1916, and was working as a teacher when the United States entered World War I.

=== World War I ===
Moore enlisted in the Army on June 1, 1917, and served overseas in France as a private and private first class with Company F of the 7th Engineers, eventually rising to battalion sergeant major in the 5th Division headquarters. He was wounded in action while attached to the 27th Division in the Somme offensive. On October 1, 1918, he accepted an infantry officer's commission as second lieutenant in the National Army, which was the temporary volunteer force that augmented the permanent Regular Army for the duration of the war. The volunteers were disbanded at the end of the war, and Moore was honorably discharged from the National Army on April 7, 1920.

=== Infantry officer ===
After the war, Moore decided to make a career of the Army. He accepted an infantry commission in the Regular Army on September 21, 1920, with a promotion to first lieutenant backdated to July 1, 1920, and was assigned to the 29th Infantry at Camp Benning, Georgia, on November 17, 1920. He was detached in 1921 to take the Infantry School Basic Course. Upon graduating in 1922, he returned to the 29th Infantry, where he remained until 1924.

On March 1, 1924, Moore began pilot training at the Air Service Primary Flying School at Brooks Field, Texas, but his detail to the Air Service was terminated on June 11, 1924, only ten weeks into the six-month curriculum, and he did not graduate. Resuming his infantry career, Moore was assigned to the 13th Infantry in Boston, Massachusetts, first as commanding officer of a recruit center at the regimental headquarters at Fort Warren, and in 1925 becoming battalion and post adjutant for the 1st Battalion, 13th Infantry at Fort Strong.

Moore married the former Adrienne Marot in Dorchester, Boston, on Thanksgiving Day 1925, and the couple moved to New Jersey, where Moore was attending the Signal School at Fort Monmouth. He graduated the next year, and the newlyweds took several months leave to visit the bride's native France, before moving to Fort McPherson, Georgia, for what would be Moore's final infantry assignment, as a communications officer in the 22nd Infantry from 1927 to 1929.

=== Finance officer ===
Moore transferred to the Finance Department of the War Department on December 12, 1929, and was assigned as Chief of the Appropriations Language Branch, War Department Budget Division. He graduated from the Finance School in 1930, and was assigned to the U.S. Army finance office in Brooklyn, New York. In 1931 he was briefly posted to the Ninth Corps Area headquarters at the Presidio of San Francisco, California, and then he and his wife embarked for a three-year assignment overseas in the Philippine Department headquarters in Manila, where he served as a disbursing officer. He returned to Washington, D.C., in 1934 to attend the Army Industrial College. He was finally promoted to captain on October 1, 1934, after 14 years as a first lieutenant.

After graduating from the Army Industrial College in 1935, he spent the next fifteen years in key Army budgeting billets in Washington, D.C., except for a period as deputy finance officer, U.S. Army, in Brooklyn, New York from 1939 to 1940. Returning to the capital in 1940, he assumed the role of War Department liaison to the Senate and House appropriations committees, a duty he would retain in various forms for the next 28 years. He was promoted to major on July 1, 1940, and temporary lieutenant colonel on September 15, 1941.

=== World War II ===
During World War II, Moore was responsible for preparing the language of military appropriation bills, and defending that language before the Bureau of the Budget and Congress. Over the course of the war, Congress appropriated $160 billion to the Army, and Moore was also charged with ensuring that the entire sum could be spent legally through the obligation and expenditure process.

He was promoted to temporary colonel on February 1, 1942, and permanent lieutenant colonel on December 11, 1942. From March 25, 1942, to July 6, 1943, he was chief of the Legislative Reference Section of the Fiscal Division in the headquarters of the Services of Supply, and Special Assistant to the budget officer for the War Department, for which service he was awarded the Legion of Merit. He was detailed to the General Staff Corps from July 12, 1943, to December 1, 1943.

After the war, Moore participated in negotiating hundreds of millions of dollars in settlements with the military governments of Germany and Korea, and with the civilian governments of Austria and Czechoslovakia. He was promoted to permanent colonel on March 11, 1948. By 1949, he was deputy chief of the budget division, and considered one of the foremost experts in military budgeting.

=== Congressional liaison ===
In January 1950, Wilfred J. McNeil, the newly appointed Assistant Secretary of Defense (Comptroller), hired Moore to be his personal liaison with Congress, and specifically with the House and Senate Appropriations Committees. Moore received the title of special assistant to the Comptroller of the Department of Defense, and was promoted to brigadier general on October 5, 1950. According to Henry E. Glass, Economic Advisor to the Comptroller, Moore achieved “extraordinary success” in this role. Glass described Moore as a “peculiar, not particularly articulate” person who was loved and trusted by the committee and its staff, and would spend as much as a thousand dollars of his own money to take congressional staffers to lunch.

Moore, whose duties had included congressional liaison since 1940, developed a knack for cultivating powerful admirers on both sides of the partisan divide. Democratic Senator John C. Stennis said, “I first became acquainted with General Moore in 1949 and soon became impressed by his abilities to analyze a problem and carry into speedy execution a workable solution. Since that time, as a member of the Defense Department Subcommittee of the Senate Appropriations Committee and, more particularly, during the years when I was chairman of the Military Construction Subcommittee, I learned that my evaluation was correct.” Republican Senator Milton Young said, “I first became personally acquainted with Bobby in 1951, when I was appointed to the Armed Services Subcommittee of the Senate Appropriations Committee….I cannot begin to enumerate, within my own experience on the Appropriations Committee, how many times we have called on Bobby Moore to straighten out vexing problems in the defense area….And it does not matter whether the problem is large or small, involving a simple question of a constituent or the utilization of billions of dollars, Bobby may always be depended on to come up with the answer.” After Moore was promoted to brigadier general and major general by Congressional legislation, Senate Appropriations Committee chairman Kenneth D. McKellar and House Appropriations Committee chairman George H. Mahon were remembered as being his primary supporters. Moore liked to observe that “the Democrats were in power at the time of his first promotion and the Republicans at the time of his second."

Moore's fellow officers eventually came to believe that he belonged more to Congress than to the Army. According to General Herbert B. Powell, “He was older, unfit for field service, but worked hard and stayed on the job so long that he became a staff officer for the committee and not a representative of the Army. Every time we tried to relieve and replace him, the committee chairman would stop us…. The last time I saw him he was dressed in a blue uniform ballooning over his stomach, trying to get on an airplane and go to Europe with the [Armed Forces] subcommittee of the Senate Appropriations Committee.” As a member of that subcommittee, Senator Young warmly endorsed Moore's participation in such trips, saying, “I found him to be extremely knowledgeable on such occasions, not only in a broad defensewide understanding, but also in his detailed familiarity with individual installations. I grew to know him, respect him, and cherish him as a valued friend. He is one of the greatest personalities I have ever known.”

=== Retirement ===
Moore received his final promotion, to major general, on May 1, 1954. Three months later, he voluntarily retired from the Army on August 31, 1954, but was recalled to active duty at the request of Congress on September 7, 1954, and continued as special assistant to the Department of Defense comptroller for another 14 years. In 1961 he was described as a former sergeant major who “has participated in the spending of more money than any other person in U.S. military history.”

By then, even Secretary of Defense Robert S. McNamara could not dislodge Moore from his liaison role. Every year, the annual defense appropriations bill was coordinated through the Comptroller's office, with Moore being the Defense Department's point of contact with the House and Senate Appropriations Committees. However, all other defense-related legislation, including the authorization bills produced by the House and Senate Armed Services Committees, was handled by the Assistant to the Secretary of Defense for Legislative Affairs. McNamara repeatedly tried to consolidate legislative operations into a single office, but Congress always blocked him. “We were never able to do that,” said David E. McGiffert, McNamara's Legislative Affairs Assistant from 1962 to 1965, “because one of the two Appropriations Committees wanted Bobby Moore to remain as the liaison individual and wanted that individual to remain in the comptroller’s office because the committee was used to being able just to pick up the telephone and call Bobby, or somebody else in the comptroller’s office, on technical points, and they were fearful that any reorganization would sever, to some degree, that channel. And no matter how much we told them that that wasn’t the intention, they were unwilling to really believe that that wouldn’t happen, intended or not.” The result was that McGiffert could schedule McNamara's appearances before every Congressional committee except one. For Appropriations Committee hearings, “I’d always have to go to Bobby to find out when McNamara was supposed to go. A silly situation, which, as I say, we never fixed.”

Moore completed 50 years of military service on November 13, 1967, an event memorialized by Senators John C. Stennis and Milton Young on the floor of the Senate. "He has served every Secretary of Defense and every Comptroller of Defense since the creation of the Department of Defense,” said Stennis. “He has acted as liaison with the Congress longer than any other individual. And he has probably written more legislative proposals than any other military man in our history." Young added, “In this role, he has perhaps done more than any other individual in bringing about harmonious and understanding working relationships between the Congress and the Department of Defense.”

Moore retired permanently from the Defense Department in 1968, and was awarded the Distinguished Service Medal by Army Chief of Staff Harold K. Johnson.

== Promotion by appropriations bill ==
Moore was the only American military officer to be promoted twice in appropriations bills, from colonel to brigadier general in 1950, and from brigadier general to major general in 1954. This was doubly unusual, in that his promotions were initiated by Congress instead of the Defense Department, and by the Appropriations Committees instead of the Armed Services Committees.

=== Background ===
Military promotions in the United States require the consent of both the executive branch and the legislative branch of the federal government. Promotions are almost always initiated by the executive branch and approved by the legislative branch, when the Department of Defense nominates candidates for promotion and the Senate confirms the nominees. In rare cases, promotions may be initiated by the legislative branch and approved by the executive branch, when Congress passes a bill containing language to that effect and the President signs the bill into law. For example, Colonel Fred C. Ainsworth was promoted in 1901 when a section of an Army reorganization law increased the rank of the Chief of the Pensions and Records Office to brigadier general, and again in 1904 when an Army appropriations bill merged the Pensions and Records Office with the Adjutant General's Department to create a new organization headed by a Military Secretary with the rank of major general.

Congressional legislation is divided between two sets of committees: the legislative committees like the House and Senate Armed Services Committees that write the authorization bills that establish, continue, or modify agencies or programs; and the House and Senate Appropriations Committees that write the appropriations bills that fund them. In principle, the jurisdiction of the appropriations committees is limited strictly to funding measures, and all other legislation is reserved for the legislative committees. In practice, these lines have often been crossed, especially between 1899 and 1921, when the Military and Naval Affairs Committees were responsible for both authorization and appropriations for the Army and Navy, and could write a single measure to both fund and reorganize the War Department, which is how Ainsworth was promoted in an appropriations bill. However, after the Budget and Accounting Act of 1921 again separated authorization from appropriation, any action that could promote an officer in an appropriations bill was viewed as infringing on the territory of the legislative committees. Such trespasses were often overlooked due to overlapping membership between the legislative and appropriations committees, but in 1959 the Armed Services Committees began asserting their jurisdiction more strictly with respect to the Appropriations Committees, passing the first annual National Defense Authorization Act in 1961, and modern Congressional rules make it unlikely that an officer would again be promoted by the Appropriations Committees instead of the Armed Services Committees.

=== Brigadier general ===
In the early 1950s, Army officer promotions were governed by the Officer Personnel Act of 1947. The Secretary of the Army could only nominate candidates for promotion if they had been selected by a board of higher ranking Army officers, mostly from the combat arms branches, who were unlikely to pick a Finance Corps colonel like Moore who had spent the entire last decade as a congressional liaison officer in Washington, D.C., including all of World War II.

“He was a colonel and had no chance of promotion,” said Herbert B. Powell, who was a brigadier general acting as chief of the personnel section of the Army general staff at the time. “Finally, one year the Army Appropriation Bill came out of the Congress, went to the White House and at the end of it there was a one line entry which said, 'Colonel Bobby So and So, Finance Corps, is promoted to the grade of brigadier general.'” Another general then serving on the Army staff, Robert W. Colglazier Jr., also recounted this incident. “We found a paragraph where this colonel had written that the committee recommended that he be promoted immediately to brigadier general. He had literally written this in, and his buddies on the committee had accepted it….I'll say this much for him, he had such a standing with the committee that when the chips were down and the Army rejected this recommendation, the committee wrote in that he would be given the title. They didn't say promoted. The word promotion wasn't used this time.”

Instead, the Supplemental Appropriations Act of 1951, signed into law on September 27, 1950, stated that “a commissioned officer on the active list of the Army not below the grade of colonel, assigned as special assistant to the Comptroller, Department of Defense, shall...be considered to hold the grade of brigadier general for all purposes and shall receive the pay and allowances of an officer of that grade.” Since Moore had been assigned as special assistant on September 20, the effect was to elevate him to brigadier general for as long as he held the job. The most recent similar promotion was a 1948 law that advanced Colonel Peter A. Feringa by assigning the rank of brigadier general to his post of Assistant to the Chief of Engineers in charge of civil works.

Moore was promoted to brigadier general on October 5, 1950, much to the dismay of the Army staff. "Well, we were fit to be tied," said Powell, "and finally we issued an order saying, 'This officer is invested with a rank of brigadier general, in accordance with section so and so of a certain Act of Congress.' So help me, one year later there was a one line entry at the last of the Appropriation Bill which promoted this officer to major general." (In fact, this happened three years later.)

=== Major general ===
In 1953, Captain Hyman G. Rickover, the father of the nuclear Navy, faced mandatory retirement after being passed over by the rear admiral selection board, and Congress was threatening to change the selection board system in order to promote Rickover anyway. Vice Admiral James L. Holloway Jr., the Navy personnel chief, was determined that Rickover be promoted within the existing system, instead of bypassing it the way Moore had. Although a selection board could not be directly ordered to promote a particular individual, it had to follow criteria provided by the Secretary of the Navy. Holloway helped Navy Secretary Robert B. Anderson write a precept that could only describe Rickover, who was duly promoted by the next selection board in July. To justify his intervention, Holloway claimed the selection system could either bend to political pressure or break. "When we're too hidebound and reactionary, there's room in the law for the Secretary to get his way. If you don't do that, you'd have a special law in Congress which would really be the end of the selection system."

Only a couple of weeks later, on August 1, 1953, Congress proved Holloway's point by promoting Moore to major general in a provision of the Department of Defense Appropriation Act for 1954. Unlike his previous promotion, which was tied to his job, this law promoted Moore personally, stating that “the officer of the Army now assigned as special assistant to the Comptroller, Department or Defense, shall, effective May 1, 1954, be considered to hold the grade of major general for all purposes….” Powell railed, “This sort of thing is what we must guard against. We must follow the system set up and prescribed by law.”

Five years later, Congress was again pressuring a reluctant Navy to promote Rickover, this time to vice admiral. Senator Clinton P. Anderson cited Moore's promotion to major general as "the most recent and best precedent" for Congress to force the Navy to make Rickover a vice admiral, going so far as to draft sample legislation that would promote Rickover personally to vice admiral using the same phrasing that had made Moore a major general. Faced with another Congressional end run, the Navy chose to promote Rickover the normal way by designating his position to carry the grade of vice admiral and submitting his promotion to be confirmed by the Senate.

== Personal life ==
Moore died at his home in Washington, D.C., on January 27, 1978, of a heart ailment, and was survived by his wife Adrienne and four sisters. His wife, Adrienne (Marot) Moore, a native of France, was awarded the Medal of French Gratitude in 1947 by the French government for her work with American Aid to France, a civilian relief organization. A younger brother, retired Army colonel Dennis Milton (“Dinty”) Moore, had survived the Bataan Death March and commanded the 15th Infantry in the Battle of Chosin Reservoir during the Korean War.

He was a 50-year Master Mason and a member of the Shriners Almas Temple in Washington, D.C. He was a member of the University Club of Washington, D.C, and the Army Navy Country Club in Arlington, Virginia.

== Dates of rank ==
Note that the date indicated is the date of rank. In some cases, the promotion was accepted at a later date.

Insignia	Rank	Temporary		Permanent	
Insignia	Rank	Component	Date	Component	Date
	Private	National Army	Jun. 1, 1917		
	Private first class	National Army			
	Battalion sergeant major	National Army			
	Second lieutenant	National Army	Sep. 25, 1918	Regular Army	Jul. 1, 1920
	First lieutenant			Regular Army	Jul. 1, 1920
	Captain			Regular Army	Oct. 1, 1934
	Major			Regular Army	Jul. 1, 1940
	Lieutenant colonel	Army of the United States	Sep. 15, 1941	Regular Army	Dec. 11, 1942
	Colonel	Army of the United States	Feb. 1, 1942	Regular Army	Mar. 11, 1948
	Brigadier general	Army of the United States	Oct. 5, 1950		
	Major general	Army of the United States	May 1, 1954	Retired list	Aug. 31, 1954

== Awards and decorations ==
Army Distinguished Service Medal
Legion of Merit (with oak leaf cluster)
Purple Heart
