= James L. Holloway III =

American admiral (1922–2019)

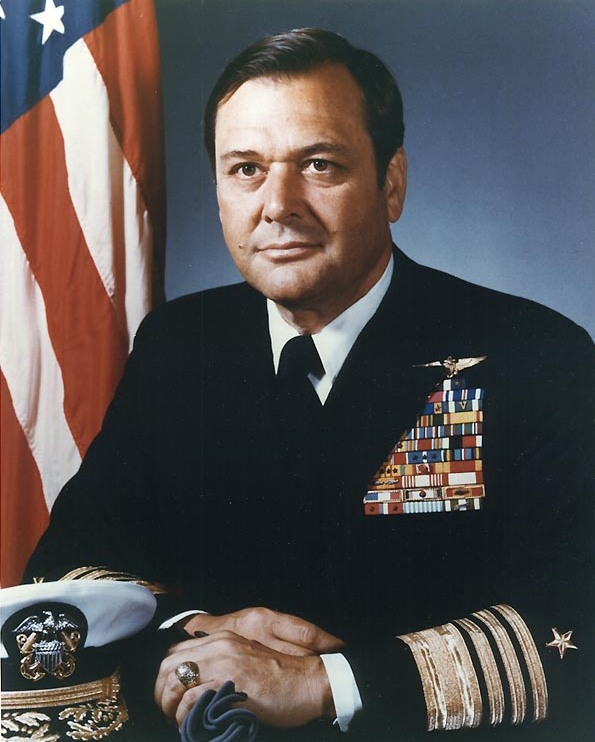
- Admiral James L. Holloway III; 20th Chief of Naval Operations
- Born: James Lemuel Holloway III; February 23, 1922; Charleston, South Carolina, U.S.
- Died: November 26, 2019 (aged 97); Alexandria, Virginia, U.S.
- Burial place: United States Naval Academy Cemetery, Annapolis, Maryland
- Relatives: Admiral James L. Holloway, Jr. (father)
- Military career
- Branch: United States Navy
- Service years: 1943–1978
- Rank: Admiral
- Commands: Chief of Naval Operations; United States Seventh Fleet; Task Force 60; Carrier Division Six; USS Enterprise (CVAN-65); USS Salisbury Sound (AV-13); VF-83; VF-52
- Conflicts: World War II; Korean War; Vietnam War
- Awards: Defense Distinguished Service Medal (2); Navy Distinguished Service Medal (4); Legion of Merit (2); Distinguished Flying Cross; Bronze Star Medal
- Other work: Technical advisor for Top Gun; Chairman Emeritus, Naval Historical Foundation

James Lemuel Holloway III (February 23, 1922 – November 26, 2019) was a United States Navy admiral and naval aviator who was decorated for his actions during World War II, the Korean War, and the Vietnam War. After the Vietnam War, he was posted to The Pentagon, where he established the Navy's Nuclear Powered Carrier Program. He served as Chief of Naval Operations from 1974 until 1978. After retiring from the Navy, Holloway served as President of the Naval Historical Foundation from 1980 to 1998 and served another ten years as its chairman until his retirement in 2008 when he became chairman emeritus. He was the author of Aircraft Carriers at War: A Personal Retrospective of Korea, Vietnam, and the Soviet Confrontation published in 2007 by the Naval Institute Press.

== Early life ==
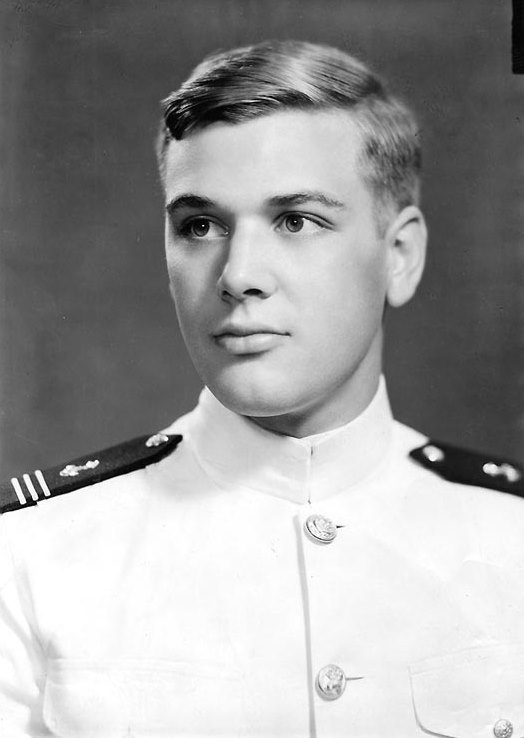
Midshipman Holloway, 1941.

Holloway was born in Charleston, South Carolina, on February 23, 1922, the son of Jean Gordon (Hagood) and then-Lieutenant (Junior Grade) James L. Holloway, Jr. (1898–1984), later a full admiral. His maternal grandfather was Major General Johnson Hagood. He graduated from Saint James School, Maryland in 1939 and was appointed to the United States Naval Academy in that year as a member of the Class of 1943. Holloway graduated from the Naval Academy in June 1942 as a member of the first three-year class accelerated by World War II.

== Naval career ==
In World War II, Holloway served in destroyers on North Atlantic convoy duty, in North African waters and in the Pacific where he participated in the Battle of Saipan, Battle of Tinian, Battle of Palau and the Battle of Leyte Gulf. He was gunnery officer of the destroyer Bennion, which at the Battle of Surigao Strait took part in a night torpedo attack which sank the Japanese battleship Yamashiro, assisted in the destruction of the destroyer Asagumo, attacked the cruiser Mogami with torpedoes, and then the following day shot down two Japanese Zeroes at short range. For this service, he received the Bronze Star Medal and Navy Commendation Medal.

After World War II, Holloway became a naval aviator. He made two carrier tours to Korea, flying Grumman F9F-2 Panther jets on combat missions against the North Korean and Chinese Communists. He assumed command of VF-52 when his commanding officer was shot down. He was awarded the Distinguished Flying Cross and three Air Medals during the Korean War, and shared in a Navy Unit Commendation awarded to the aircraft carrier Valley Forge.

Cmdr Holloway, commanding officer, VA-83.

In 1958, as commanding officer of VA-83, flying Douglas A-4 Skyhawks from the carrier Essex, Holloway covered the Marine landings in Lebanon and flew patrols in support of U.S. operations there until Essex was redeployed through the Suez Canal to join the Seventh Fleet in the Formosa Straits. There, he flew missions in defense of Quemoy and Matsu against the threat of a Chinese Communist invasion of those offshore islands.

From 1965 to 1967, Holloway commanded the carrier Enterprise, the Navy's first, and at that time, only nuclear-powered aircraft carrier for two combat cruises in the Gulf of Tonkin against the North Vietnamese. Enterprise established a record for the number of combat sorties flown, won the Battle Efficiency "E" award for the best carrier in the fleet, and was awarded a Navy Unit Commendation. Holloway twice received the Legion of Merit for his leadership.

Returning to the Pentagon, in 1968 Holloway established the Navy's Nuclear Powered Carrier Program, building the supercarrier Nimitz and paving the way for nine more supercarriers of this class. He was awarded the Navy Distinguished Service Medal for this achievement.

In 1970, Holloway was commander of the Carrier Striking Force of the Sixth Fleet and deployed to the Eastern Mediterranean to conduct carrier air operations in reaction to the Syrian invasion of Jordan. After the strong U.S. military response brought about the withdrawal of the Syrian forces, his task force covered the evacuation of an Army MASH (Mobile Army Surgical Hospital) unit from Amman, Jordan, by a Marine Expeditionary Group. For his performance of duty Holloway was awarded a second Navy Distinguished Service Medal and shared in a Meritorious Unit Commendation awarded to his flagship, the carrier Independence.

Holloway took command of the Seventh Fleet in 1972 during the Vietnam War, and personally led a cruiser-destroyer gunfire strike force during the Battle of Haiphong Harbor. During Operation Linebacker II, he directed the massive carrier strikes against Hanoi, which were a part of the intensive joint air effort which led to the Vietnam cease-fire in 1973. Under his command, the Seventh Fleet performed the airborne mine clearing operations in North Vietnam ports in accordance with the terms of the Paris Peace Accords. For duty as Commander, Seventh Fleet, he received a third Navy Distinguished Service Medal. He then served as Vice Chief of Naval Operations from 1973 to 1974.

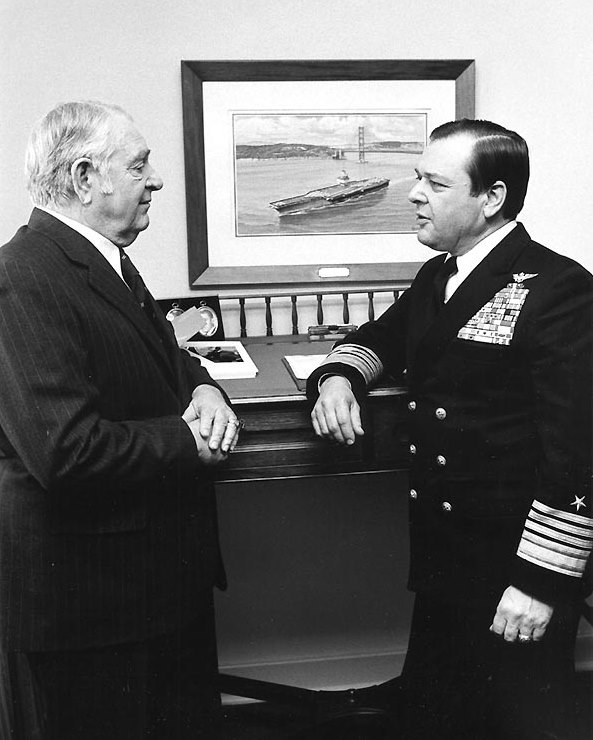
Admiral James L. Holloway, Jr., (left) with his son, Admiral J.L. Holloway, III, CNO, in 1974.

As Chief of Naval Operations (CNO) from 1974 to 1978, Holloway was a member of the Joint Chiefs of Staff (JCS), and served as CNO during the evacuation of Cyprus; the rescue of the merchant ship SS Mayaguez and its crew, and punitive strike operations against the Cambodian forces involved in its seizure; the evacuation of U.S. nationals from Lebanon; and the Korean demilitarized zone incident in August 1976, which led to an ultimatum and an armed standoff between the Allied and North Korean armies before the North Koreans backed down. For this service, Holloway was presented a fourth Navy Distinguished Service Medal and two awards of the Defense Distinguished Service Medal.

=== Post-Navy career ===
After retiring from the navy in 1978, Holloway was a consultant to Paine Webber, Inc. and served until 1988 as president of the Council of American-Flag Ship Operators, a national association of U.S. merchant marine companies. In 1980 he chaired the Special Operations Review Group which investigated the aborted Iranian hostage rescue attempt. In 1985 he served as executive director of Vice President George H. W. Bush's Task Force on Combating Terrorism, and was a member of the President's Blue Ribbon Commission on Defense Management. In 1986, he was appointed as a Special Envoy of the Vice President to the Middle East. Later, he was a member of the Commission on Merchant Marine and Defense and the Defense Commission on Long Term Integrated Strategy. In 1985 Holloway was the technical advisor to the film Top Gun.

Holloway was chairman of the Academic Advisory Board of the United States Naval Academy, chairman of the Association of Naval Aviation, a director of the Olmsted Foundation, a trustee of the George C. Marshall Foundation, served on the Board of Visitors and Governors of St. John's College and served in a presidential appointment as US Representative to the South Pacific Commission. In 1994, he received the triennial Modern Patriot Award from the General Society of the Sons of the American Revolution, and in 1997 the National Navy League Award for Outstanding Civilian Leadership. In 1998, he was elected to the National Amateur Wrestling Hall of Fame. In 2000, he was selected by the US Naval Academy Alumni Association to receive the Distinguished Graduate Award for service to the Navy and the Naval Academy. He was enshrined in the National Museum of Naval Aviation's Hall of Honor in 2004.

Holloway was conspicuous in his personal support for the Navy's official history programs run by the Naval History & Heritage Command. His grant made the Online Dictionary of American Naval Fighting Ships Project possible, thereby opening one of the most important US naval history resources to a worldwide audience. He was chairman emeritus of the Naval Historical Foundation and the Historic Annapolis Foundation, a trustee of Saint James School, and an emeritus member of the board of the Mariners' Museum. He was a member of the Society of the Cincinnati, the Brook Club (New York City), Maryland Club (Baltimore, Maryland), New York Yacht Club, Annapolis Yacht Club, and the Metropolitan Club of Washington, D.C., where he served as president in 1992.

== Awards and decorations ==
Among his more than forty military decorations and medals are the following:

Naval Aviator Badge

Defense Distinguished Service Medal with one bronze oak leaf cluster
Navy Distinguished Service Medal with three gold award stars
Legion of Merit with one award star
Distinguished Flying Cross
Bronze Star with Combat V
Air Medal with two award stars
Navy and Marine Corps Commendation Medal with Combat V
Navy Unit Commendation with one bronze service star
Navy Meritorious Unit Commendation
China Service Medal
American Defense Service Medal with one service star
American Campaign Medal
European-African-Middle Eastern Campaign Medal
Asiatic-Pacific Campaign Medal with four service stars
World War II Victory Medal
Navy Occupation Service Medal
National Defense Service Medal
Korean Service Medal
Armed Forces Expeditionary Medal
Vietnam Service Medal
Order of the Rising Sun (Japan)
Order of Cultural Merit (Korea) 2nd Class
National Order of Vietnam Commander
Vietnam Gallantry Cross with two palms
Order of May of Naval Merit (Argentina, degree unknown)
Order of Naval Merit (Brazil) Knight
French Legion of Honor (degree unknown)
Order of Merit Grand Cross (Germany)
Philippine Presidential Unit Citation
Korean Presidential Unit Citation
Republic of Vietnam Gallantry Cross Unit Citation
Philippine Liberation Medal with two service stars
United Nations Korea Medal
Republic of Vietnam Campaign Medal
Korean War Service Medal

== Death ==
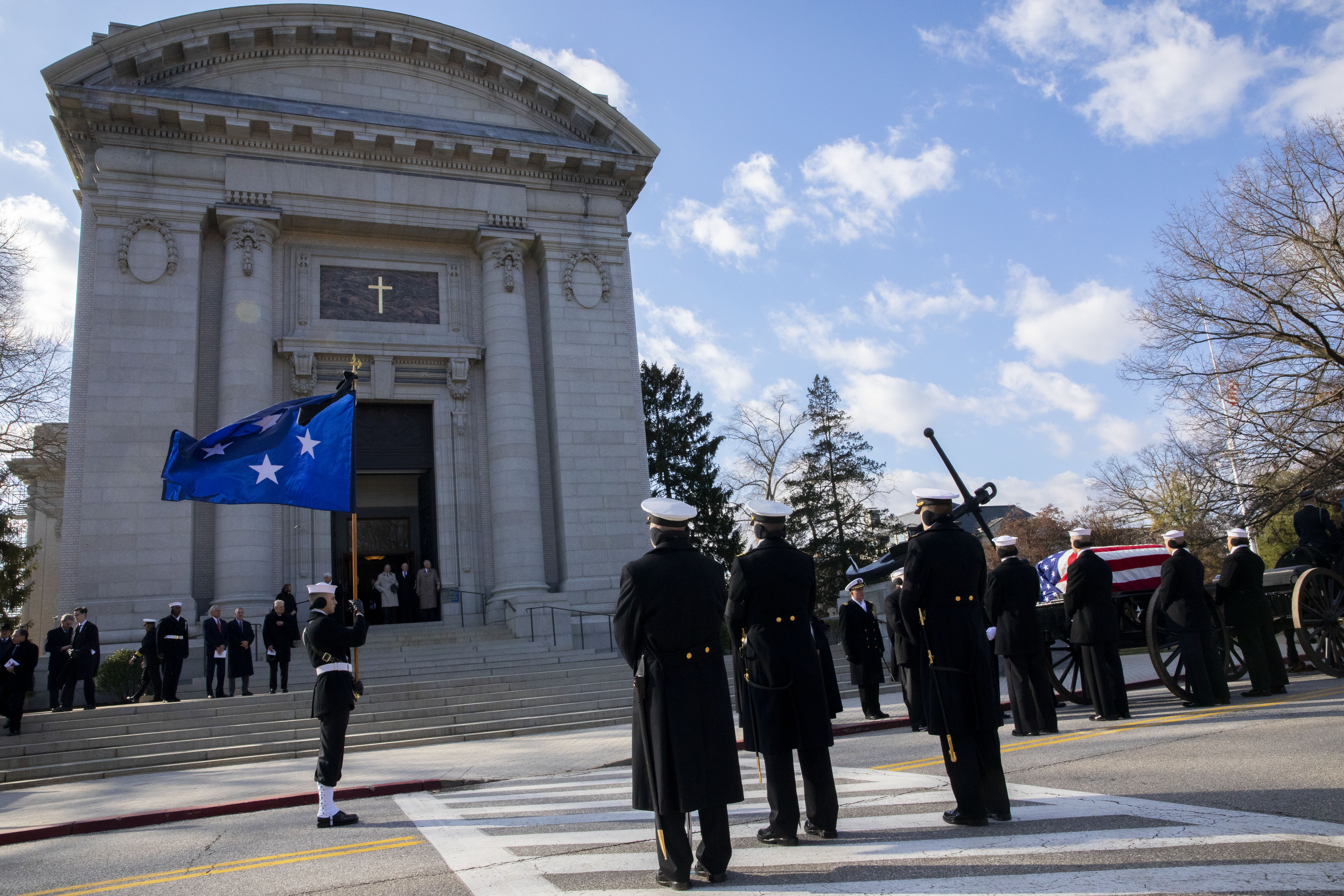
Holloway's funeral procession in December 2019

Admiral Holloway died on November 26, 2019, in Alexandria, Virginia.

== See also ==
- List of USS Enterprise (CVN-65) commanding officers

== Notes ==
Military offices
Preceded by Elmo R. Zumwalt, Jr.	Chief of Naval Operations; 1974–1978	Succeeded by Thomas B. Hayward
Preceded by Maurice F. Weisner	Vice Chief of Naval Operations; 1973–1974	Succeeded by Worth H. Bagley
