= VF-52 =

Fighter Squadron 52
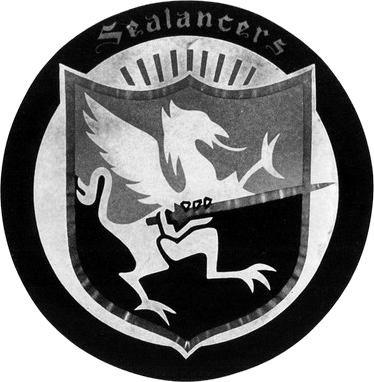
- Active: 1 May 1945 – 23 February 1959
- Country: United States
- Branch: United States Navy
- Role: Fighter aircraft Ground Attack Close Air Support
- Part of: Inactive
- Nickname: Sealancers
- Engagements: Korean War

Aircraft flown
- Fighter: F4U-4 Corsair; TO-1 Shooting Star; F9F-2 Panther; F2H-3 Banshee

Fighter Squadron 52 or VF-52 was an aviation unit of the United States Navy. Originally established as Bombing Fighting Squadron 5 (VBF-5) on 8 May 1945, it was redesignated Fighting Squadron 6A (VF-6A) on 15 November 1946, redesignated as Fighter Squadron 52 (VF-52) on 16 August 1948 it was disestablished on 23 February 1959. It was the third US Navy squadron to be designated as VF-52.

== Operational history ==
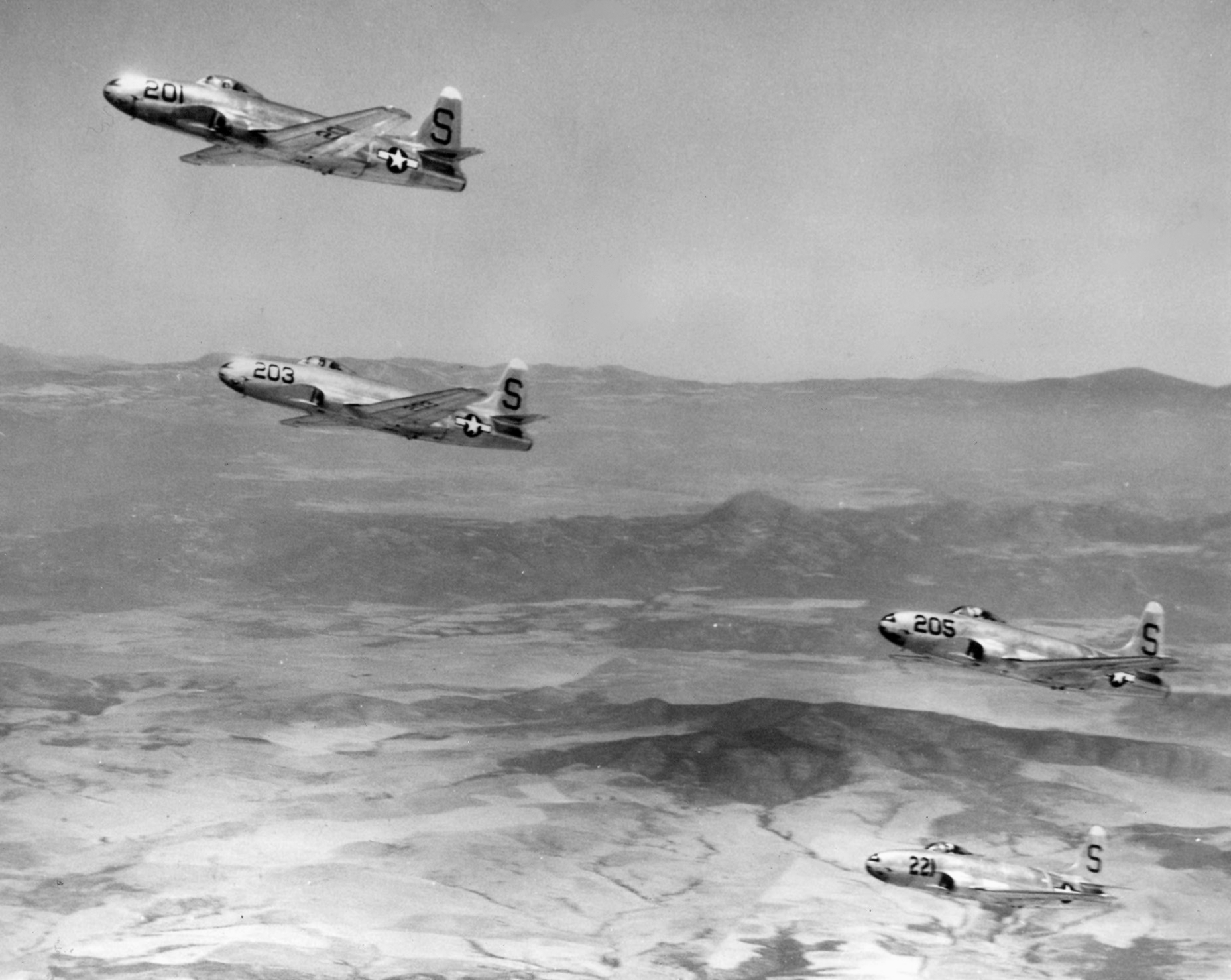
VF-52 TO-1s in 1948

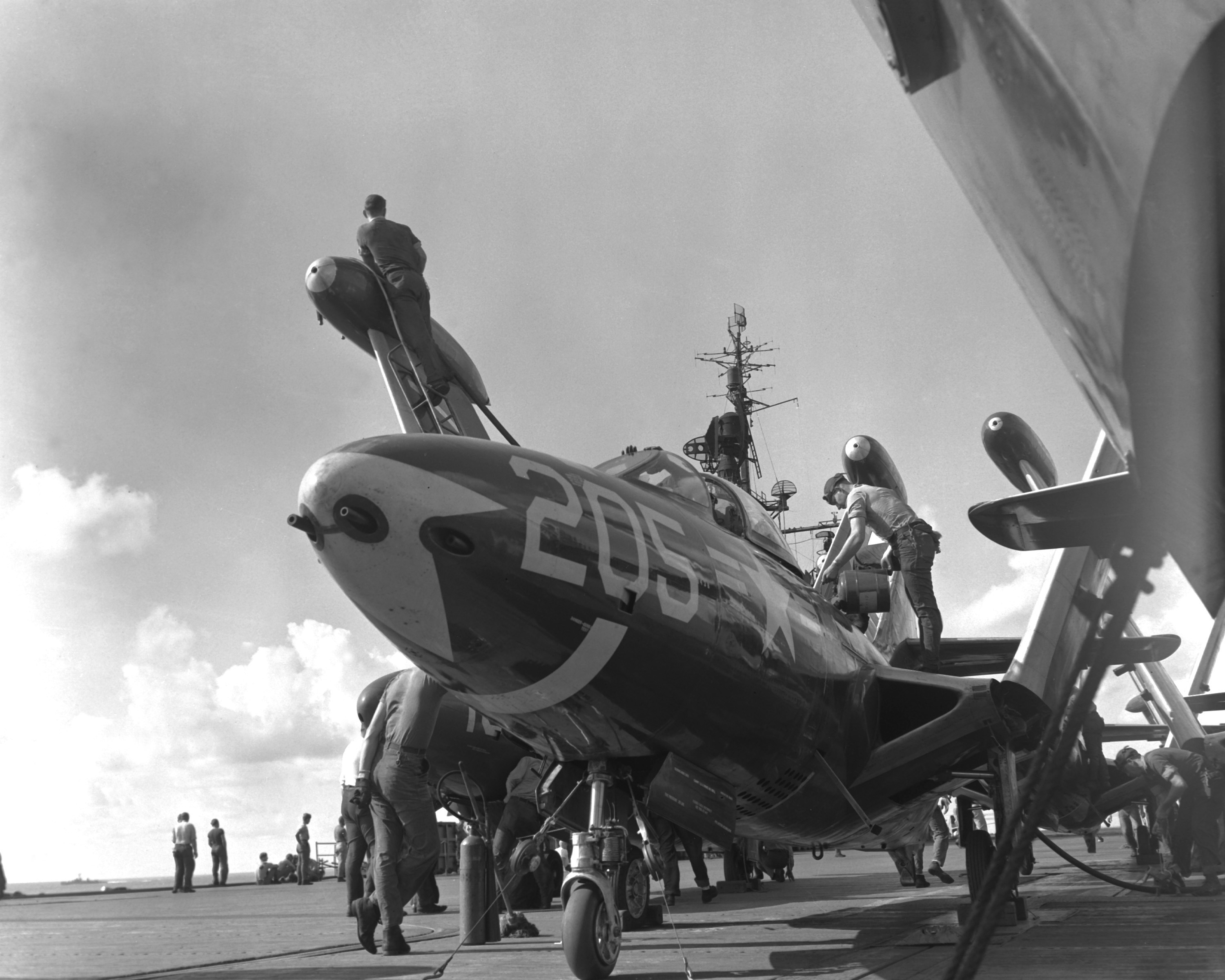
VF-52 F9F-2 on USS Valley Forge in 1950

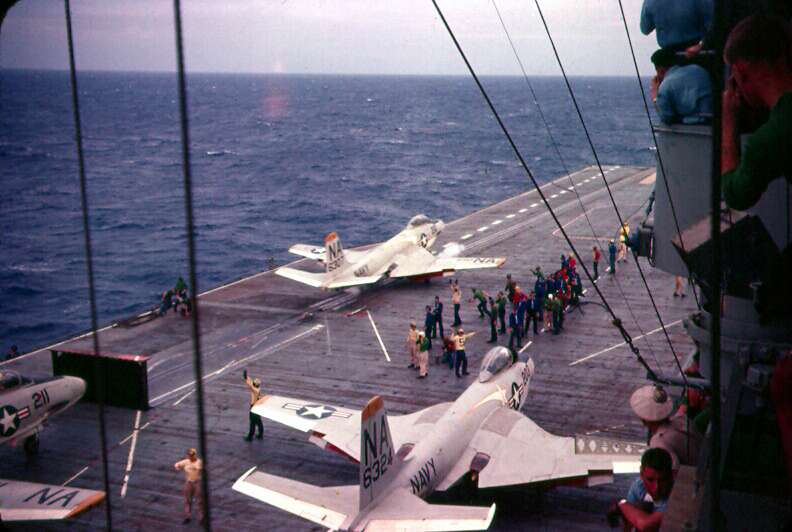
VF-52 F2H-3s prepare to launch from USS Ticonderoga in 1958

VF-52 was the only Navy squadron equipped with the TO-1 Shooting Star, a version of the Air Force's F-80C that was acquired to familiarise Navy pilots with jet aircraft due to delays in developing naval jets.

VF-52 was assigned to Carrier Air Group 5 (CVG-5) on board the USS Valley Forge and was deployed to the Western Pacific and Korea from 1 May to 1 December 1950. VF-52 along with VF-51, where the first Navy jet squadrons to see combat. On 18 November 1950 VF-52 pilot LtCom William E. Lamb was credited with shooting down a Korean People's Air Force MiG-15, this was the Navy's second jet vs jet kill.

VF-52 served its second Korean War deployment assigned to Air Task Group 1 (ATG-1) aboard the USS Valley Forge from 15 Oct 1951 to 3 July 1952.

VF-52 served its third Korean War deployment assigned to Air Task Group 1 (ATG-1) aboard the USS Boxer from 30 Mar 1953 to 28 Nov 1953.

VF-52 embarked on the USS Wasp for a WestPac deployment as part of ATG1 from 1 Sep 1954 to 11 Apr 1955.

VF-52 embarked on the USS Lexington for a Western Pacific deployment from 28 May to 20 December 1956.

VF-52 embarked on the USS Ticonderoga for a Western Pacific deployment from 4 October 1958 to 16 February 1959.

== Home port assignments ==
- NAS North Island

== Aircraft assignment ==
- F4U-4 Corsair
- TO-1 Shooting Star
- F9F-2 F9F-5 Panther
- F2H-3 Banshee

== Notable former members ==
James L. Holloway III

LT John Howard Thayer

== See also ==
- History of the United States Navy
- List of inactive United States Navy aircraft squadrons
- List of United States Navy aircraft squadrons
