= Walter F. Boone =

Admiral in the United States Navy

Walter Fredrick Boone
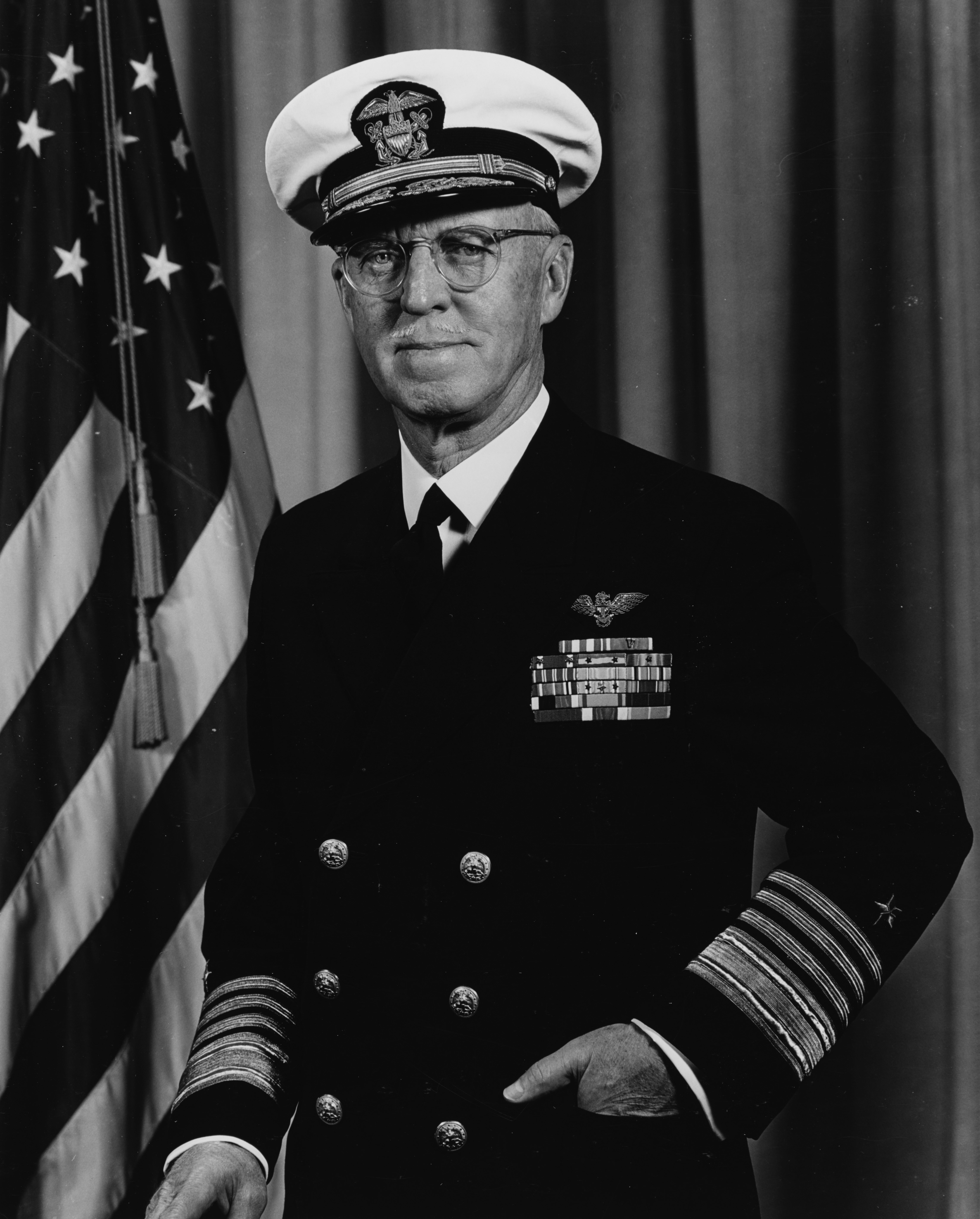
- Born: February 14, 1898; Berkeley, California, U.S.
- Died: March 19, 1995 (aged 97); Walter Reed Army Medical Center, Washington D.C., U.S.
- Military career
- Allegiance: United States of America
- Branch: United States Navy
- Service years: 1917–1960
- Rank: Admiral
- Commands: U.S. Naval Forces, Eastern Atlantic and Mediterranean; Superintendent of the United States Naval Academy, others below
- Conflicts: World War II
- Awards: Navy Distinguished Service Medal; Legion of Merit; Silver Star

Walter Fredrick Boone (February 14, 1898 – March 19, 1995) was an admiral in the United States Navy. Boone was born in Berkeley, California, and joined the Navy in 1917. Participating in World War II, Boone was awarded the Silver Star in 1942 for actions during the Battle of the Santa Cruz Islands. He was later Commander in Chief, U.S. Naval Forces, Eastern Atlantic and Mediterranean from 1956–1958 and U.S. Military Representative, NATO Military Committee from 1958–1960. Boone was also superintendent of the U.S. Naval Academy from August 12, 1954 to March 16, 1956. He retired in 1960. Boone died in 1995 of a heart attack at the age of 97.

Academic offices
Preceded by C. Turner Joy	Superintendent of United States Naval Academy; 1954–1956	Succeeded by William R. Smedberg III
