= President's House (Naval War College) =

Historic house in Rhode Island, United States

- President's House, Naval War College
- U.S. National Register of Historic Places
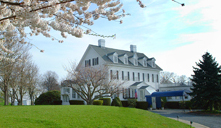
- Location: Newport, Rhode Island
- Coordinates: 41°30′28″N 71°19′40″W
- Built: 1896
- Architect: Creighton Withers
- Architectural style: Colonial revival
- NRHP reference No.: 89001219
- Added to NRHP: September 18, 1989

The President's House (also known as Quarters AA) is the home of the President of the Naval War College in Newport, Rhode Island. The house is a wooden, three-story building in Colonial Revival style located on a hill on Coaster's Harbor Island, overlooking Coaster's Harbor, Dewey Field, and Narragansett Bay.

The house was built in 1896 by local Newport, Rhode Island, architect and builder Creighton Withers at the cost of $16,226. Built originally as "Quarters B" for the commandant of the Naval Training Station, Newport, the first president of the Naval War College to occupy it was Rear Admiral French Ensor Chadwick, in June 1903.

Every Naval War College president except for Charles Stillman Sperry (1903–1906) has lived in the house since that time. Among the most famous residents of the house have been Admirals William Sims, Raymond A. Spruance, Stansfield Turner, and James Stockdale.

It was listed on the National Register of Historic Places in 1989.

== List of occupants ==
- Rear Adm. French Ensor Chadwick June 1903 - Nov 16, 1903
- Rear Adm. John Porter Merrell May 24, 1906 - Oct 06, 1909
- Rear Adm. Raymond Perry Rodgers Oct 6, 1909 - Nov 20, 1911
- Rear Adm. Austin Melvin Knight Dec 15, 1913 - Feb 16, 1917
- Captain William S. Sims Feb 16, 1917 - Apr 28, 1917

From April 28, 1917, to April 11, 1919, the academic activities of the Naval War College were discontinued due to United States participation in World War I. During this period, the reserve force of the Second Naval District used the college buildings and a series of three acting presidents maintained the administrative side of the college.

- Rear Adm. William S. Sims Apr 11, 1919 - Oct 14, 1922
- Rear Adm. Clarence Stewart Williams Nov 3, 1922 - Sept 5, 1925
- Rear Adm. William Veazie Pratt Sept 5, 1925 - Sept 17, 1927
- Rear Adm. Joel Roberts Poinsett Pringle Sept 19. 1927 - May 30, 1930
- Rear Adm. Harris Laning June 16, 1930 - May 13, 1933
- Rear Adm. Luke McNamee Jun 3, 1933 - May 29, 1934
- Rear Adm. Edward Clifford Kalbfus June 18, 1934 - Dec 15, 1936
- Rear Adm. Charles Philip Snyder Jan 2, 1937 - May 27, 1939
- Rear Adm. Edward Clifford Kalbfus June 30, 1939 - June 16, 1942
- Admiral Edward Clifford Kalbfus (Ret.) June 16, 1942 - November 2, 1942
- Rear Adm. William Satterlee Pye Nov 2, 1942 - July 1, 1944
- Vice Adm. William Satterlee Pye (Ret.) July 1, 1944 - Mar 1, 1946
- Admiral Raymond Ames Spruance Mar 1, 1946 - July 1, 1948
- Vice Adm. Donald Bradford Beary Nov 1, 1948 - May 28, 1950
- Vice Adm. Richard L. Conolly Dec 1, 1950 - Nov 2, 1953
- Vice Adm. Lynde D. McCormick May 3, 1954 - Aug 16, 1956
- Rear Adm. Thomas H. Robbins, Jr. Sept 5, 1956 - Aug 1, 1957
- Vice Adm. Stuart H. Ingersoll Aug 13, 1957 - June 30, 1960
- Vice Adm. Bernard L. Austin June 30, 1960 - July 31, 1964
- Vice Adm. Charles L. Melson July 31, 1964 - Jan 25, 1966
- Vice Adm. John T. Hayward Feb 15, 1966 - Aug 30, 1968
- Vice Adm. Richard G. Colbert Aug 30, 1968 - Aug 17, 1971
- Vice Adm. Benedict J. Semmes, Jr. Aug 17, 1971 - Jun 30, 1972
- Vice Adm. Stansfield Turner June 30, 1972 - August 9, 1974
- Vice Adm. Julien J. LeBourgeois Aug 9, 1974 - April 1, 1977
- Rear Adm. Huntington Hardesty April 1, 1977 - Oct 13, 1977
- Vice Adm. James B. Stockdale Oct 13, 1977 - Aug 22, 1979
- Rear Adm. Edward F. Welch, Jr. Aug 22, 1979 - Aug 17, 1982
- Rear Adm. James E. Service Oct 14, 1982 - Jul 12, 1985
- Rear Adm. Ronald F. Marryott August 8, 1985 - Aug 12, 1986
- Rear Adm. John A. Baldwin Sept 2, 1986 - Aug 11, 1987
- Rear Adm. Ronald J. Kurth August 11, 1987 - July 17, 1990
- Rear Adm. Joseph C. Strasser July 17, 1990 - June 29, 1995
- Rear Adm. James R. Stark June 29, 1995 - July 24, 1998
- Vice Adm. Arthur K. Cebrowski July 24, 1998 - Aug 22, 2001
- Rear Adm. Rodney P. Rempt Aug 22, 2001 - July 9, 2003
- Rear Adm. Ronald A. Route July 9, 2003 - August 12, 2004
- Rear Adm. Jacob Shuford October 2004 - Nov 6, 2008
- Rear Adm. James P. Wisecup July 6, 2010 - March 30, 2011
- Rear Adm. John N. Christenson March 30, 2011 - July 14, 2013
- Rear Adm. Walter E. Carter Jr. July 15, 2013 - ca. July 2014
- Rear Adm. P. Gardner Howe, III ca. July 2014 - ca. July 2016
- Rear Adm. Jeffrey A. Harley ca. July 2016 - ca. June 2019
- Rear Adm. Shoshana S. Chatfield ca. August 2019 -

== See also ==
- National Register of Historic Places listings in Newport County, Rhode Island
