= Henry Clay Taylor =

United States Navy admiral (1845–1904)

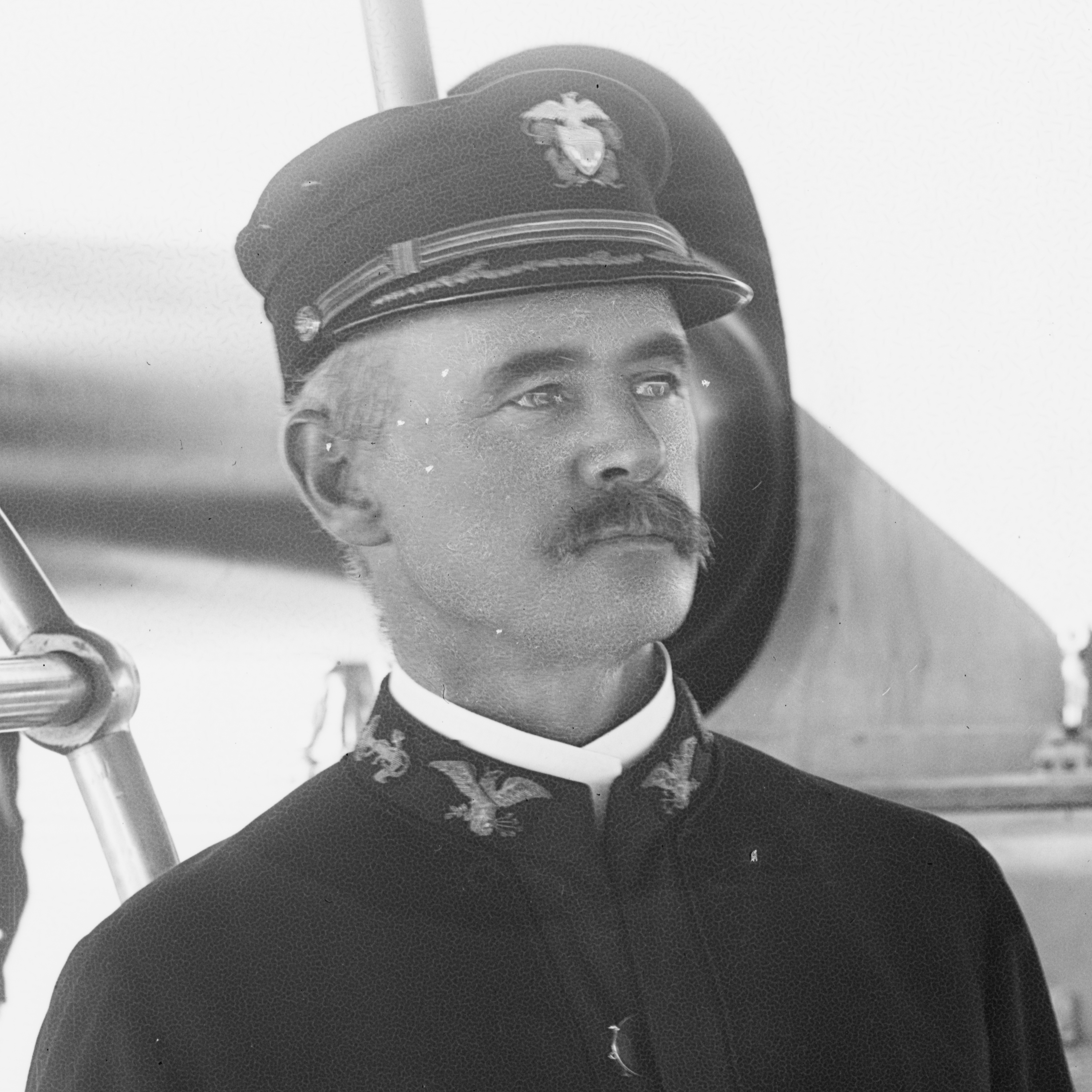
- Henry Clay Taylor commanding the USS Indiana c. 1896-1902
- Born: March 4, 1845; Washington, D.C., U.S.
- Died: July 26, 1904 (aged 59); Ontario, Canada
- Burial place: Arlington National Cemetery
- Military career
- Allegiance: United States of America
- Branch: United States Navy
- Service years: 1860–1904
- Rank: Rear admiral
- Nickname: Harry
- Commands: Hassler; Saratoga; Alliance; Indiana
- Conflicts: American Civil War; Spanish–American War

Henry Clay Taylor (4 March 1845 – 26 July 1904) was a rear admiral in the United States Navy who served in the American Civil War and the Spanish–American War. He also served as Chief of the Bureau of Navigation and President of the Naval War College.

== Early life and Civil War service ==
Taylor was born in Washington, D.C. He was appointed midshipman at the Naval Academy on 28 September 1860. When the Civil War expansion of the Navy engendered a pressing need for junior officers in the fleet, Midshipman Taylor's class was graduated a year early. He was commissioned ensign on 28 May 1863 and posted to the steam sloop Shenandoah operating with the North Atlantic Blockading Squadron. In 1864, he was transferred to the sloop-of-war Iroquois, in which he visited the Mediterranean and participated in the hunt for the Confederate raider CSS Shenandoah.

== Postwar service ==
After the Civil War, Taylor served in a succession of ships on various stations. In 1866 and 1867, he was in Rhode Island with the North Atlantic Squadron, and he was assigned to Susquehanna from 1867 to 1868. His next tour of duty, in 1868 and 1869, was with the European Squadron in the storeship Guard.

Between 1869 and 1880, Taylor sandwiched two tours at sea in between two periods of shore duty. His first assignment ashore—in 1869, 1870, and 1871—was at the Naval Academy. Following that, he was executive officer of Saranac, the flagship of the Pacific Squadron, from 1872 to 1874. Over the next three years, Lieutenant Commander Taylor commanded the United States Coast Survey steamer Hassler. In 1877, he came ashore once more, this time assigned to the Hydrographic Office. From there, he went to the Washington Navy Yard where he was serving at the time of his promotion to commander in December 1879.

In 1880, Commander Taylor resumed sea duty as the commanding officer of Saratoga. In 1884 and 1885, he was on special duty at New York City. From 1885 to 1887, Taylor served as a member of the Board of Inspection and then took a leave of absence in 1888. In 1890, he returned to duty to command Alliance on the Asiatic Station until September 1891 when he took another leave of absence until December 1892. After six months' special duty in 1893, Taylor became President of the Naval War College.

== Spanish–American War ==
In April 1894, he was promoted to captain. Captain Taylor assumed command of USS Indiana (Battleship No. 1) in December 1894. His ship was assigned to the North Atlantic Squadron, and he commanded her through the Spanish–American War in 1898.

== Flag assignments ==
In the fall of 1899, Taylor was detached from Indiana and assigned to shore duty. In March 1900, he became a member of the General Board and, 11 months later on 11 February 1901, he was promoted to rear admiral. On 29 April 1902, he assumed the post of Chief of the Bureau of Navigation, which he held until his death.

Admiral Taylor was a member of the Maryland Society of the Cincinnati and companion of the California Commandery of the Military Order of the Loyal Legion of the United States.

== Namesakes ==
Three U.S. Navy vessels have been named Taylor. The first Taylor (DD-94) was named for Rear Admiral Henry Clay Taylor, the second Taylor (DD-468) commemorates Rear Admiral William Rogers Taylor, and the third ship USS Taylor (FFG-50) commemorates Commander Jesse Junior Taylor.

== Burial ==
Admiral Taylor and his wife Mary Virginia are buried at Arlington National Cemetery.

Military offices
Preceded by Charles Herbert Stockton	President of the Naval War College; 1893–1896	Succeeded by Caspar F. Goodrich
