= USS Monterey (CVL-26) =

Independence-class light aircraft carrier of the US Navy

Coordinates: 6°13′N 151°19′E

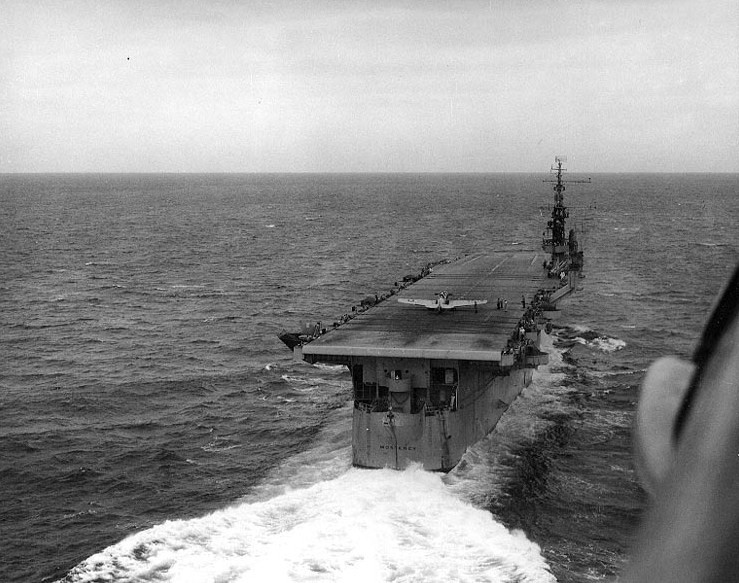
- USS Monterey (August 1951)

History

United States
- Name: Monterey
- Namesake: Battle of Monterey
- Builder: New York Shipbuilding Corporation
- Laid down: 29 December 1941
- Launched: 28 February 1943
- Commissioned: 17 June 1943
- Decommissioned: 11 February 1947
- Recommissioned: 15 September 1950
- Decommissioned: 16 January 1956
- Reclassified: CV-26, 27 March 1942; CVL-26, 15 July 1943; AVT-2, 15 May 1959
- Stricken: 1 June 1970
- Fate: Sold for scrap May 1971

General characteristics
- Class & type: Independence-class aircraft carrier
- Displacement: 11,000 tons
- Length: 622.5 ft (189.7 m)
- Beam: 71.5 ft (21.8 m) (waterline), 109 ft 2 in (33.27 m) (overall)
- Draft: 26 ft (7.9 m)
- Speed: 31.6 knots (58.5 km/h; 36.4 mph)
- Complement: 1,569 officers and men
- Armament: 26 × Bofors 40 mm guns, 20 × Oerlikon 20 mm cannons
- Aircraft carried: 45

USS Monterey (CVL-26) was an Independence-class light aircraft carrier of the United States Navy, in service during World War II and used in training for several years thereafter.

Originally laid down as light cruiser Dayton (CL-78) on 29 December 1941 by New York Shipbuilding, Camden, New Jersey, the ship was reclassified CV-26 on 27 March 1942 and renamed Monterey four days later, launched on 28 February 1943, sponsored by Mr. Patrick N. L. Bellinger, and commissioned on 17 June 1943, Captain Lestor T. Hundt in command. It was the third US Navy vessel to be named after the Battle of Monterey. Future U.S. President Gerald R. Ford served aboard the ship during World War II.

== Service history ==
=== World War II ===
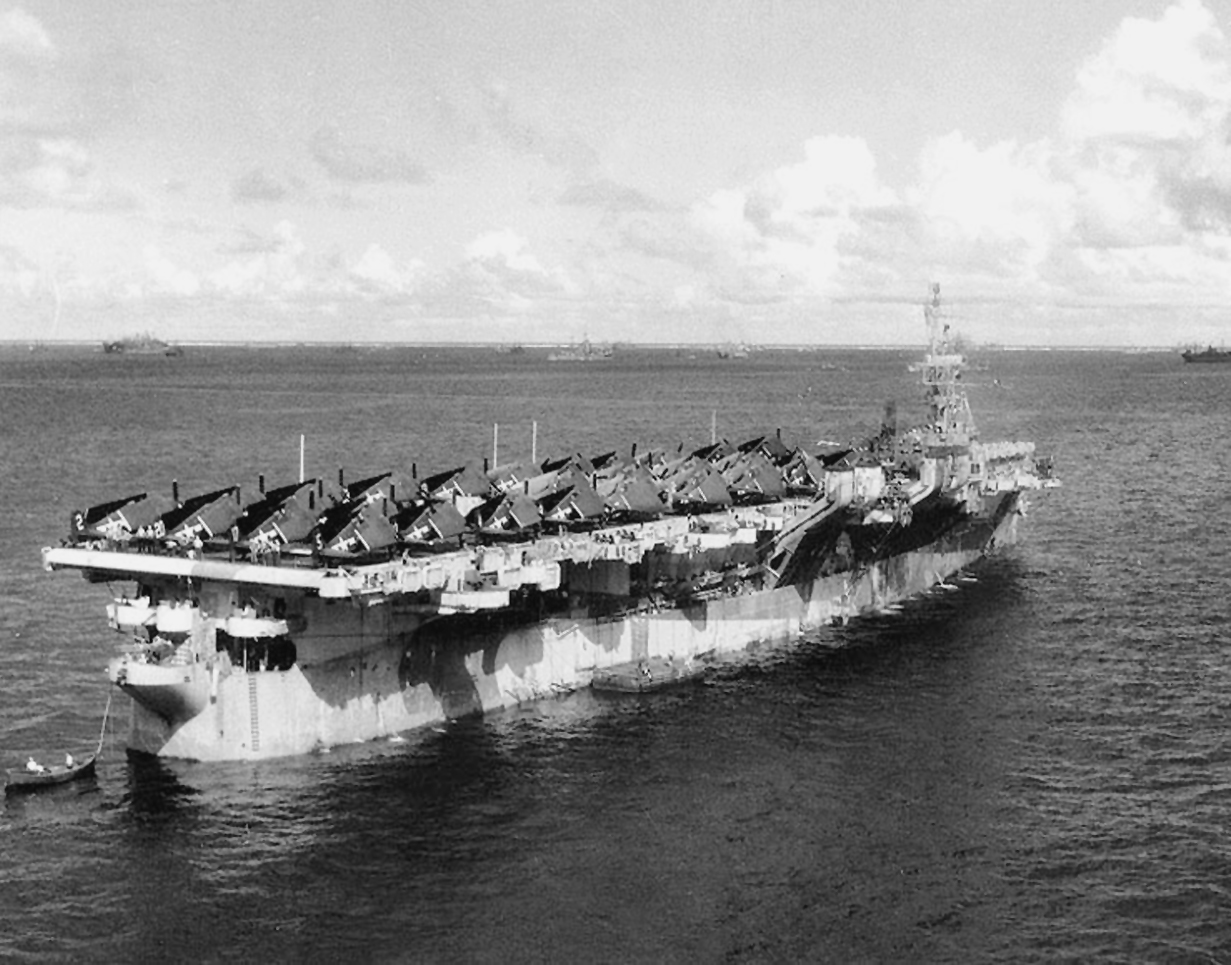
Monterey in 1944

Monterey was reclassified CVL-26 on 15 July 1943, shortly before commissioning, and after shakedown, departed Philadelphia for the western Pacific. She reached the Gilbert Islands on 19 November 1943, in time to help secure Makin Island. She took part in strikes on Kavieng, New Ireland, on 25 December, as part of Task Group 37.2, and supported the landings at Kwajalein and Eniwetok until 8 February 1944. The light carrier then operated with Task Force 58 (TF 58) during raids in the Caroline Islands, Mariana Islands, northern New Guinea, and the Bonin Islands from February–July 1944. During this time, she was also involved in the Battle of the Philippine Sea on 19–20 June.

Monterey then sailed to Pearl Harbor for overhaul, departing once again on 29 August. She launched strikes against Wake Island on 3 September, then joined TF 38 and participated in strikes in the southern Philippines and the Ryukyus. October through December 1944 were spent in the Philippines, supporting first the Leyte, and then the Mindoro landings.

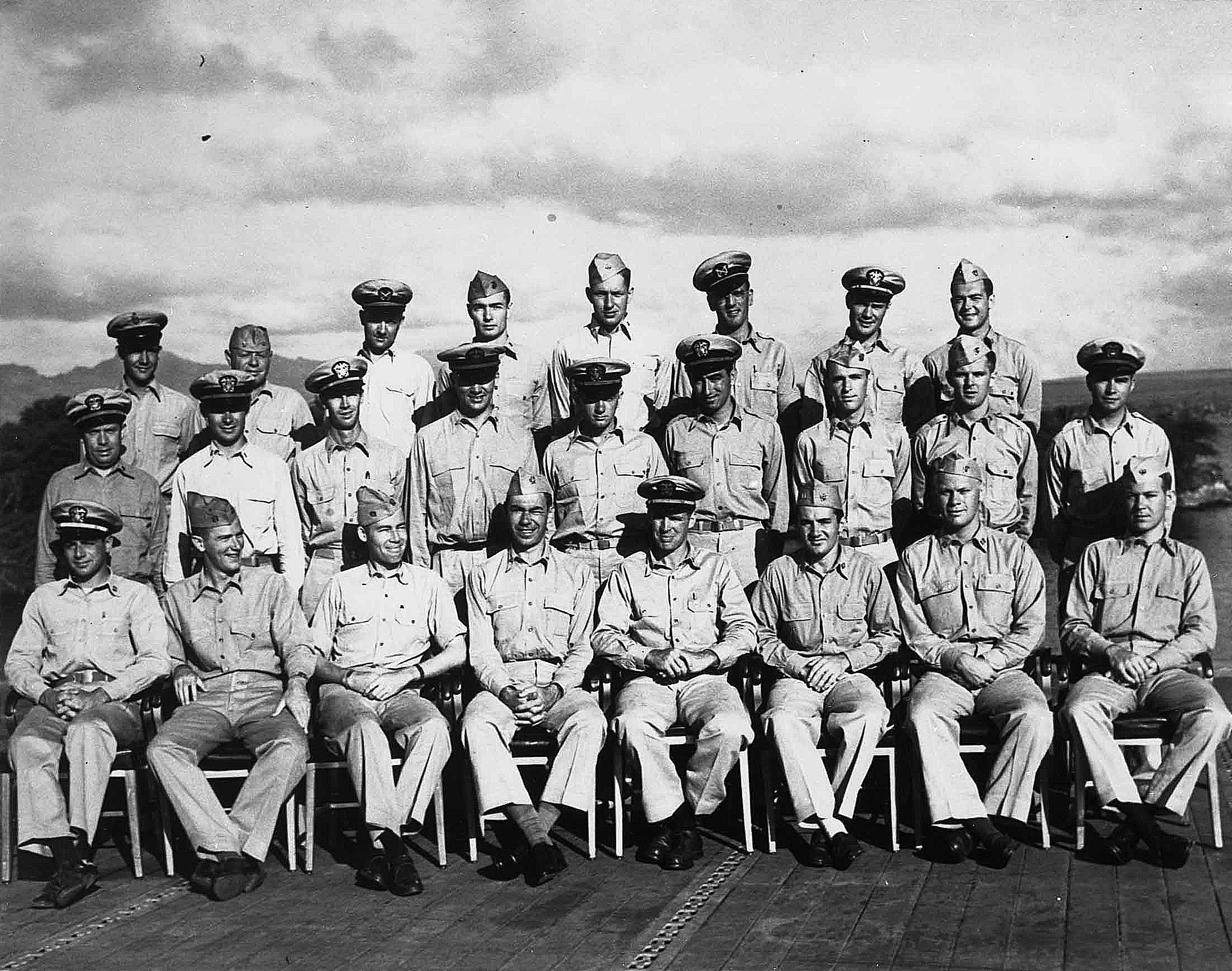
The gunnery officers of USS Monterey. Gerald R. Ford is second from the right, in the front row.

Though enemy planes had been unable to damage Monterey, she did not complete her first full year of service unscathed. In December, she steamed into the path of Typhoon Cobra, with winds over 100 knots (185 km/h; 115 mph). At the height of the storm, which lasted two days, several planes tore loose from their cables, causing several fires on the hangar deck. During the storm, future US President Gerald Ford, who served on board the ship, was almost swept overboard. Ford, serving as general quarters officer of the deck, was ordered to go below to assess the raging fire. He did so safely, and reported his findings back to the ship's commanding officer, Captain Stuart Ingersoll. The ship's crew was able to contain the fire, and the ship got underway again.

Monterey arrived Bremerton, Washington, for overhaul in January 1945. She rejoined TF 58 and supported Okinawa operations by launching strikes against Nansei Shoto and Kyūshū from 9 May to 1 June. She rejoined TF 38 for the final strike against Honshū and Hokkaidō from 1 July to 15 August.

=== After the war ===
Monterey departed Japanese waters on 7 September, having embarked troops at Tokyo, and steamed home, arriving in New York City on 17 October. Monterey left behind an impressive and enviable war record. Her planes sank five enemy warships and damaged others. She was responsible for the destruction of thousands of tons of Japanese shipping, hundreds of planes, and vital industrial complexes. She was assigned "Magic Carpet" demobilization duty, and made several voyages between Naples and Norfolk. She was decommissioned on 11 February 1947, and was assigned to the Atlantic Reserve Fleet, Philadelphia Group.

=== Korea ===
With the outbreak of hostilities in the Korean War, Monterey was recommissioned on 15 September 1950. She departed Norfolk on 3 January 1951, and proceeded to Pensacola, Florida, where she operated for the next four years under Naval Training Command, training thousands of naval aviation cadets, student pilots, and helicopter trainees. Monterey was relieved as a training carrier by Saipan, which had previously served at Pensacola as a training carrier in 1946 and 1947. From 1 to 11 October 1954, she took part in a flood rescue mission in Honduras. She departed Pensacola on 9 June 1955 and steamed to rejoin the reserve fleet. She was decommissioned on 16 January 1956. Reclassified AVT-2 on 15 May 1959, she remained berthed at Philadelphia until she was sold for scrapping in May 1971.

== Awards ==
Monterey received 11 battle stars for World War II service.

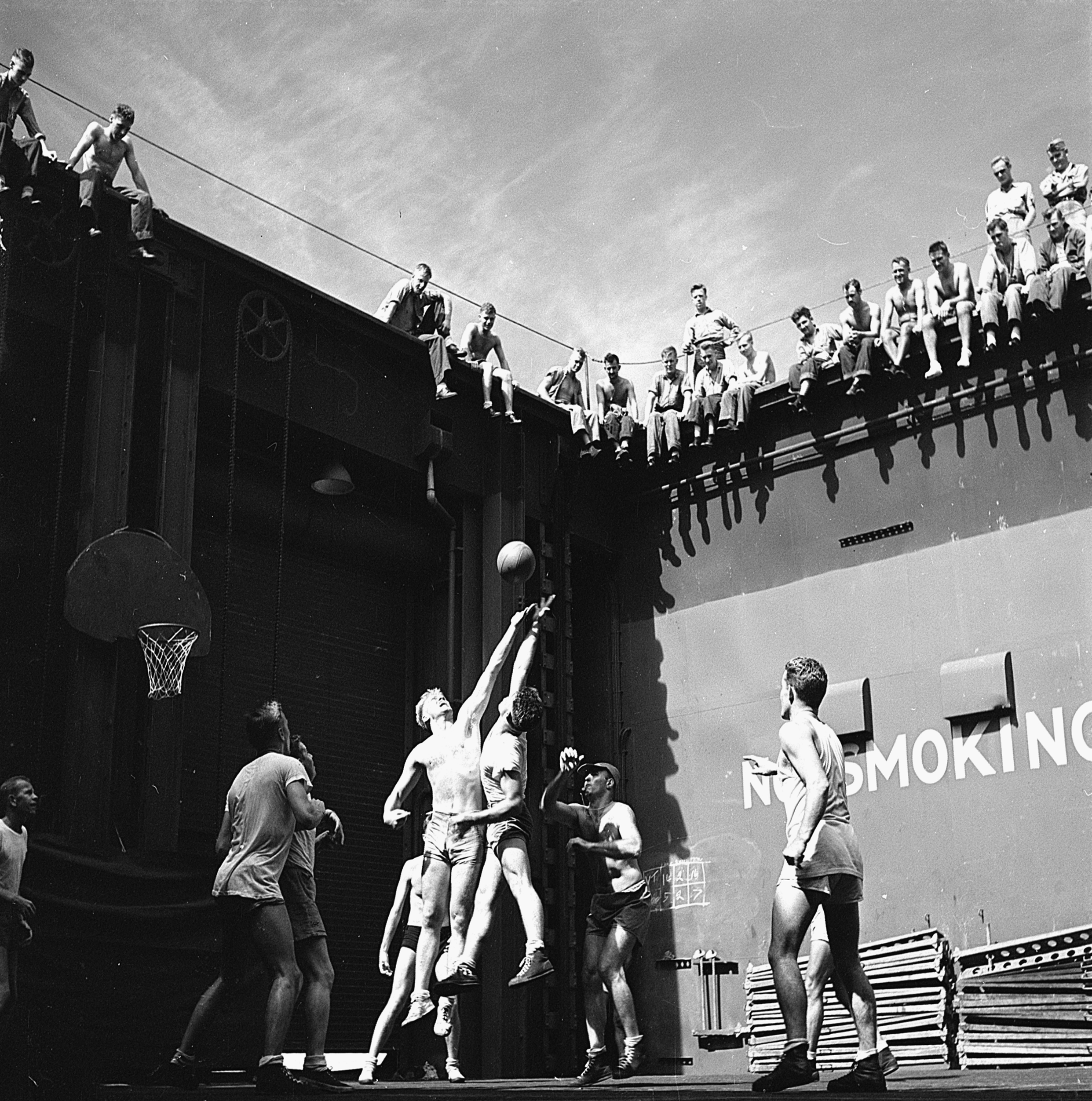
Navy junior officers in forward elevator well playing basketball. Jumper at left is Gerald R. Ford, mid-1944
