= John Porter Merrell =

American soldier (1846–1916)

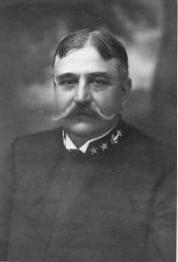
- Born: 7 September 1846; Auburn, New York, US
- Died: 8 December 1916 (aged 70); New London, Connecticut, US
- Burial place: United States Naval Academy Cemetery, Annapolis, Maryland
- Military career
- Allegiance: United States
- Branch: United States Navy
- Service years: 1867–1909
- Rank: Rear Admiral
- Commands: Naval Station New Orleans; USS Oregon (BB-3); President of the Naval War College
- Conflicts: Spanish–American War

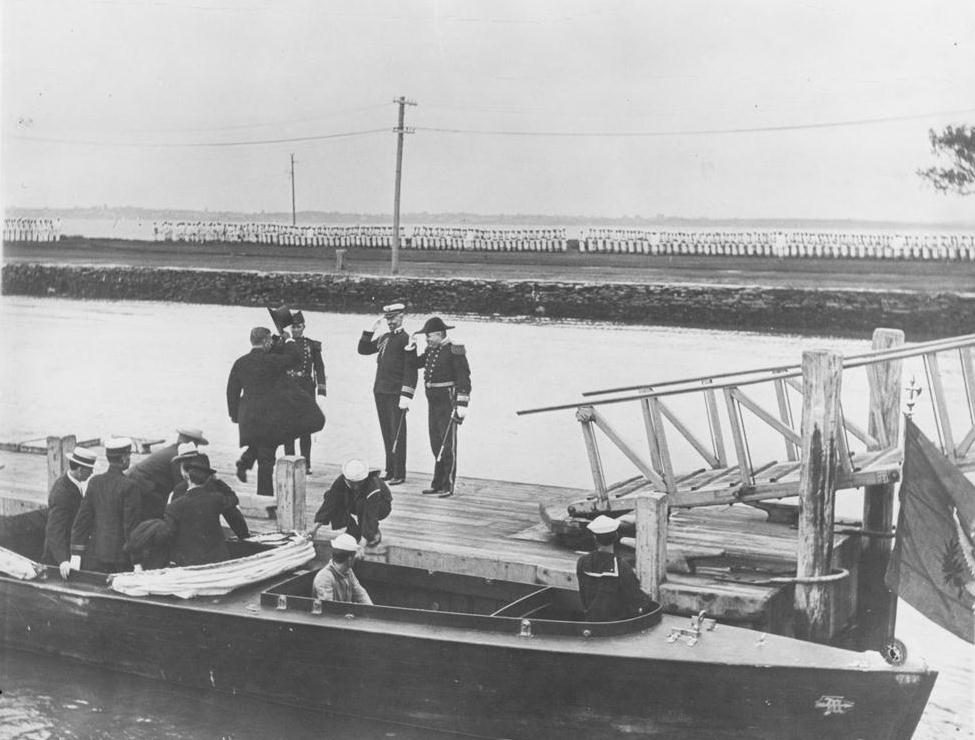
Merrell (standing farthest right on pier) salutes President Theodore Roosevelt (at left, back to camera, tipping his top hat) as Roosevelt steps off the barge from the presidential yacht USS Mayflower onto the pier at the Naval War College in Newport, Rhode Island, on 22 July 1908 to spend the day as chairman of the ongoing Battleship Conference there. Roosevelt's naval aide, Commander William S. Sims, standing next to Merrell, also salutes Roosevelt.

Rear Admiral John Porter Merrell (7 September 1846 – 8 December 1916) was an officer in the United States Navy. He served in the Spanish–American War and as the 11th President of the Naval War College.

== Naval career ==
Merrell was born in Auburn, New York, on 7 September 1846, the son of John Camp Merrell and the former Jane A. Allen. He entered the United States Naval Academy on 20 July 1863, graduating in June 1867.

Merrell's first assignment was to the European Squadron from 1867 to 1870. While there, he served aboard the screw sloop-of-war USS Ticonderoga from 1867 to 1868, was promoted to ensign on 18 December 1868, and served aboard the screw sloop-of-war USS Plymouth from 1869 to 1870.

Merrell returned from Europe in 1870 and performed signals duty in Washington, D.C. He was promoted to master on 21 March 1870. From 1870 to 1871, he participated in the Darién Surveying Expedition, which attempted to survey a route for a canal across the Isthmus of Panama.

After returning from the expedition, Merrell – who was promoted to lieutenant on 21 March 1871 – served at the Naval Torpedo Station in Newport, Rhode Island, from 1872 to 1875, then aboard the screw frigate USS Swatara in the North Atlantic Squadron from 1875 to 1877. He was the officer-in-charge of the Naval Ordnance Proving Ground from 1877 to 1879.

In 1879, Merrell returned to sea, serving aboard the third-rate screw steamer USS Marion in the North Atlantic Squadron and South Atlantic Squadron until 1881, when he transferred to the screw sloop-of-war USS Shenandoah in the North Atlantic Squadron, remaining aboard her until 1882.

After leaving Shenandoah, Merrell taught mathematics, physics, mechanics, and chemistry at the U.S. Naval Academy from 1882 to 1887, then returned to sea from 1887 to 1889 as a member of the staff of the commander-in-chief of the European Squadron, embarked consecutively aboard the steamer USS Pensacola, the screw corvette USS Quinnebaug, and the screw sloop-of-war USS Lancaster as each of those ships served as flagship. He was promoted to lieutenant commander during this tour on 28 May 1888.

Merrell again taught mathematics at the U.S. Naval Academy from 1889 to 1893, serving as head of the Applied Mathematics Department from 1890 to 1893. He then served in the Asiatic Squadron aboard the protected cruiser USS Baltimore from 1893 to 1895, and from 1895 to 1896 was a member of the State Department Commission charged with investigating anti-foreign riots in Sichuan in the Chinese Empire.

Merrell was promoted to commander on 1 November 1896 and was inspector in the 13th Lighthouse District from 1896 until January 1898, when he joined the staff of the Naval War College in Newport, Rhode Island. After the Spanish–American War broke out in April 1898, he transferred in May 1898 to the North Atlantic Squadron, where he served aboard the steamer USS Scipio and the stores ship USS Glacier.

Leaving Glacier, he became the equipment officer at the New York Navy Yard in Brooklyn, New York, in October 1898. He then served aboard the protected cruiser USS Montgomery from 1899 until 1900, when he became equipment officer at the Norfolk Navy Yard in Portsmouth, Virginia. Promoted to captain on 26 September 1901, he served as Commandant of Naval Station New Orleans in New Orleans, Louisiana, from 1901 to June 1903, then returned to the staff of the Naval War College until October 1903, when he resumed his commandant duties at New Orleans. He returned to the Asiatic Squadron in 1904 as commanding officer of the battleship USS Oregon.

Relinquishing command of Oregon, Merrell returned to Newport, Rhode Island, to become the 11th President of the Naval War College on 24 May 1906. While president, he was promoted to rear admiral on 19 March 1907. The most notable event of his presidency was the suspension by direction of President Theodore Roosevelt of the 1908 summer course on 8 July so that the General Board of the United States Navy, the bureau chiefs of the United States Department of the Navy, and the college's staff and students could participate in a "Battleship Conference" at the college, with Roosevelt himself visiting to chair the conference for a day on 22 July 1908. Secretary of the Navy Victor H. Metcalf closed the conference on 1 September 1908.

Merrell was placed on the retirement list on 7 September 1908, but at the request of Secretary of the Navy Metcalf remained on active duty for an additional 13 months until 6 October 1909, when his college presidency ended and he left active Navy service.

== Personal life ==
Merrell married Sarah Frances Tyler on 22 January 1872. The couple made their home in her home town, Marshall, Michigan.

Merrell was a life member of the United States Naval Institute, as well as a member of the Army and Navy Club in Washington, D.C., the Naval Academy Club in Annapolis, Maryland, and the Army and Navy Club in Manila in the Philippine Islands.

== Death ==
Merrell fell ill while visiting his daughter and son-in-law in New London, Connecticut, late in 1916, and died in their apartment on 8 December 1916. He is buried at the United States Naval Academy Cemetery.

== Notes ==
Military offices
Preceded by Charles S. Sperry	President of the Naval War College; 24 May 1906 – 6 October 1909	Succeeded by Raymond P. Rodgers
