= Caspar F. Goodrich =

United States admiral

Caspar Frederick Goodrich
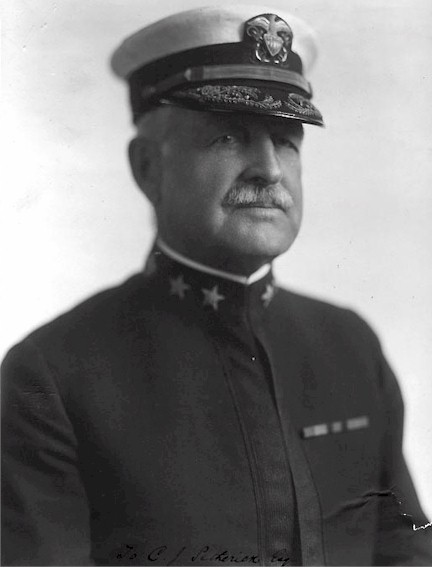
- Rear Admiral Caspar F. Goodrich, USN portrait photograph by Harris & Ewing, Washington, D.C., taken c. 1904–1909
- Born: 7 January 1847; Philadelphia, Pennsylvania, U.S.
- Died: 26 January 1925 (aged 78); Princeton, New Jersey, U.S.
- Military career
- Allegiance: United States of America
- Branch: United States Navy
- Service years: 1864–1919
- Rank: Rear Admiral
- Conflicts: Spanish–American War

Caspar Frederick Goodrich (7 January 1847 – 26 January 1925) was an admiral of the United States Navy, who served in the Spanish–American War and World War I.

== Biography ==
Goodrich was born in Philadelphia, Pennsylvania. He was the son of William and Sarah A. Bearden Goodrich. He applied from Connecticut and was graduated from the United States Naval Academy in 1864, he spent 2 years in Colorado and Frolic; 3 years in Portsmouth and Lancaster; and 3 years at the Naval Academy. Between 1874 and 1881 he had duty on board the USS Tennessee and USS Kearsarge followed by a tour at the Naval Torpedo Station, Newport, R.I. After serving as executive officer of Lancaster, flagship for the European Squadron, and Inspector of Ordnance at the Washington Navy Yard, Goodrich became Officer in Charge of the Newport Torpedo Station in 1886. From 1891 until 1896, he commanded successively Jamestown, Constellation, and Concord before he spent a year as President of the Naval War College at Newport. Originating the Coast Signal Service in 1898, he then served as director.

During the Spanish–American War in 1898, he commanded the USS St. Louis and Newark, and received the surrender of Manzanillo, Cuba, following that city's bombardment on 12 August. In the years following, Goodrich commanded Iowa, Richmond, Minneapolis, and Puritan at sea and served as Commandant of the Philadelphia Navy Yard (1900) and the Portsmouth Navy Yard (1903) on land before his promotion to the rank of Rear Admiral 17 February 1904 and his appointment for 3 years as the Commander-in-Chief of the Pacific Squadron. After the 1906 San Francisco earthquake he went with his fleet to San Francisco to help extinguish the fire, especially by spraying water on the flames from ships anchored in the port. After duty as commandant of the New York Navy Yard 1907 to 1909, he retired 7 January 1909.

Goodrich was a member of the Naval Order of the United States and served as Commander of the New York Commandery from 1907 to 1908. In 1914 he was admitted as an honorary member of the Connecticut Society of the Cincinnati.

Recalled to active duty in World War I, Admiral Goodrich served as officer-in-charge of the Pay Officers' Material School at Princeton until 8 November 1919 when he again stepped down from active duty, ending a 50-year naval career. In 1873 he married Eleanor Milnor. They had a large house in Pomfret, Connecticut called "Gladwyn". He died in Princeton.

In 1945, the destroyer USS Goodrich (DD-831) was named in honor of Goodrich and his son Lieutenant Caspar Goodrich.

== Published works ==
- Torpedoes—Their Disposition and Radius of Destructive Effect [Washington, D.C., 1882].
- Report of the British Naval and Military Operations in Egypt, 1882. By Lieutenant-Commander Caspar F. Goodrich. Washington, Gov't print. off., 1883, 1885.
- In Memoriam, Stephen Bleecker Luce: Rear Admiral, United States Navy, Born 1827, Died 1917, a Tribute. New York City: The Naval History Society, 1919.
- Rope Yarns from the Old Navy. New York, The Naval History Society, 1931.

Military offices
Preceded by Alfred Thayer Mahan	President of the Naval War College; 1889–1892	Succeeded by Alfred Thayer Mahan
Preceded by Henry Clay Taylor	President of the Naval War College; 1896–1898	Succeeded by Charles Herbert Stockton
Preceded by Henry Glass	Commander-in-Chief, Pacific Squadron; 1905–1906	Succeeded by William T. Swinburne
