= President of the Naval War College =

High-ranking administrator and policy advisor in the US Navy

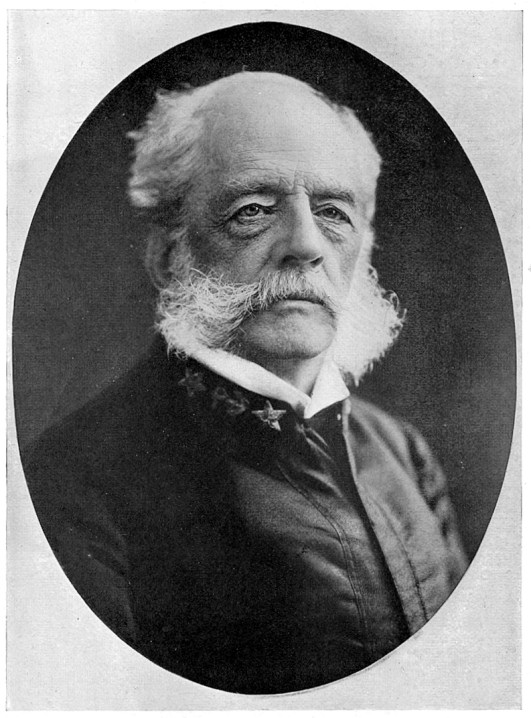
Stephen B. Luce, first president of the Naval War College.

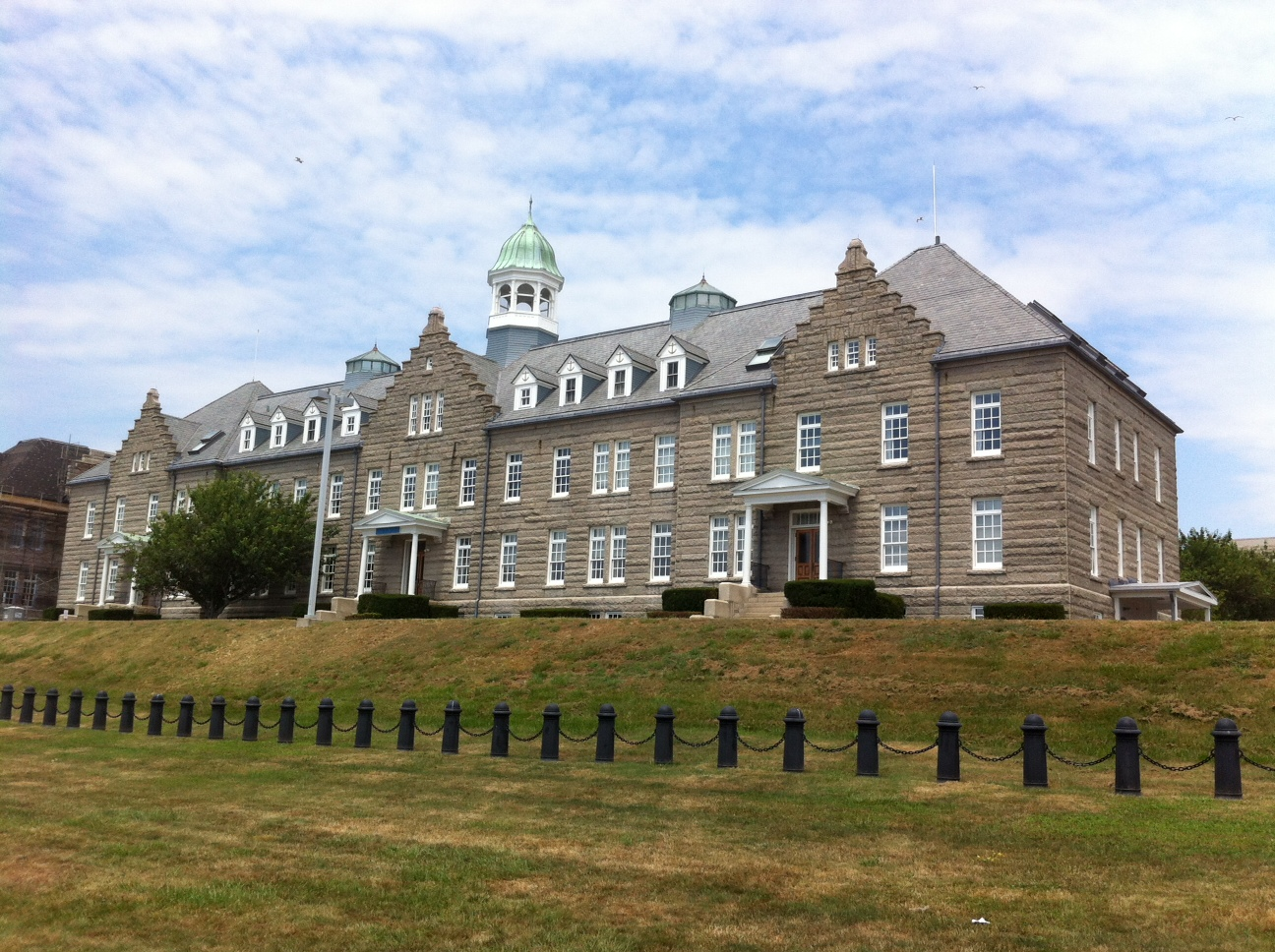
Luce Hall at Naval War College.

The president of the Naval War College is a flag officer in the United States Navy. The President's House in Newport, Rhode Island is their official residence.

The functions of the president of the Naval War College actually predate the establishment of the institution. As Commandant of the Newport Naval Station and then as Commodore of the Atlantic Squadron, Stephen B. Luce established enlisted education and training with the Apprentice School along the shores of the Narragansett Bay. Luce had earlier delivered lectures on naval strategy and command from the facilities of the Naval Torpedo Station on Goat Island before he spearheaded efforts to procure the building and surrounding grounds on Coaster's Harbor Island, which still stands as the location of the Naval War College. The office of the president was formally created along with the Naval War College as a whole by U.S. Navy General Order 325, signed by Secretary of the Navy William E. Chandler on 6 October 1884. The order stipulated that a commissioned officer of the Navy no lower in grade than commander command the institution. Initially, the Navy Department registered the officer in command as the "commandant," which Commodore Stephen B. Luce rather chose to use the title of "president." Eventually, the Navy Department formally listed the officer in command of the Naval War College as "president." Although the original General Order establishing the Naval War College also directed that the president serve presiding officer of a board consisting of the president and the officers assigned, successive presidents of the institution influenced the establishment of the General Board of the Navy by 1900. Thus, the President of the Naval War College and the staff assigned had an interrelated role in the deliberations of the General Board which also determined the yearly focus of the curriculum within the college. This system influenced the early development of the Naval War College in the era of the First and Second World Wars. The unification of the joint services after 1947 and then the Goldwater-Nichols Act legislation subsequently changed the curricular functions of the Naval War College.

General Order 325 identified the college's first president as Commodore Stephen B. Luce, who took office on the day Chandler signed the order. The last captain to serve as president left the position in 1913, after which all presidents have been flag officers. Since 1948, all presidents of the Naval War College have been vice admirals or rear admirals.

While college activities were suspended during the Spanish–American War, the presidency was vacant. When activities were again suspended during World War I, and during periods since World War I between the departure of an outgoing president and the arrival of a successor, acting presidents have administered the college until a new president reported for duty.

The college counts individuals who serve more than once as president as a separate president for each tour for purposes of chronological numbering of the presidents. Acting presidents are not counted.

The presidency of the Naval War College is one of only four positions in the United States Navy which has an official portrait associated with it, the others being the secretary of the Navy, the chief of naval operations, and the superintendent of the United States Naval Academy. The Naval War College Museum holds in its collection the official portraits of all but ten of the presidents, including all presidents since 1939.

== Presidents ==
Presidents of the Naval War College in chronological order.

	Rank	Name	Photo	Term Began	Term ended	Highlights of Term
1	Rear Admiral	Stephen Luce		6 October 1884	22 June 1886	Founder of and driving force behind the Naval War College; "Intellectual Leader of the 'New Steel Navy'"; saw the college as the highest level of professional naval education and "place of original research on war ... statesmanship connected with war, or the prevention of war."
2	Captain	Alfred Thayer Mahan		22 June 1886	12 January 1889	First of two terms as president. His 1886 and 1887 lectures at the college formed the basis of his internationally influential 1890 naval strategy book The Influence of Sea Power Upon History: 1660–1783. Mahan was suddenly reassigned from duty at the Naval War College, as efforts to close the institution unfolded in Washington.
3	Captain	Caspar F. Goodrich		12 January 1889	22 July 1892	Through the efforts of Luce and other supporters, Goodrich supervised the construction of the college's first purpose-built building which was later to be christened, Luce Hall. During his first of two tours as President of the Naval War College, Goodrich also worked in close conjunction with the General Board of the Navy to synthesize the curriculum with operational innovation in an era of transition from wooden-hulled to steel armored warships, submarines, and automotive torpedoes. Goodrich also helped organize undersea salvage and mine warfare organizations at this time.
4	Captain	Alfred Thayer Mahan		22 July 1892	10 May 1893	The first person to serve a second term as college president. His 1892 lectures at the college formed the basis of his two-volume 1892 naval strategy book The Influence of Sea Power Upon the French Revolution and Empire: 1793–1812.
5	Commander	Charles Herbert Stockton		10 May 1893	13 November 1893	First of two terms as college president. Although the Department of the Navy authorized no course at the college in 1893, he and the college's other two staff members prepared one anyway. Discussed the possible closure of the college with Bowman H. McCalla, who in turn wrote to Lieutenant Benjamin H, Buckingham, the commanding officer of the gunboat USS Dolphin, which was scheduled to transport Secretary of the Navy Hilary A. Herbert to Newport in August 1893. Herbert planned to close the college during the visit, but changed his mind after Buckingham gave him Mahan's The Influence of Sea Power Upon the French Revolution and Empire: 1793–1812 to read.
6	Captain	Henry Clay Taylor		15 November 1893	31 December 1896	Established the curriculum the college would use until 1919; made wargaming part of the curriculum and established the use of case studies in studying international law.
7	Captain	Caspar F. Goodrich		31 December 1896	23 April 1898	Second of two terms as college president. Led the college's advocacy of advanced rational contingency planning. During this period, Goodrich also hosted the Assistant Secretary of the Navy, Theodore Roosevelt. In 1897, Roosevelt delivered a speech to the Naval War College to articulate a vision for the future of American sea power, which he later characterized under the title, "Our Navy, The Peacemaker."
–	–	–	–	22 March 1898	2 November 1898	Naval War College served as a venue for the General Board of the Navy to meet during the Spanish–American War.
8	Captain	Charles Herbert Stockton		2 November 1898	25 October 1900	Second of two terms as college president. Defended the college against attempts to sabotage it by collocating it with the United States Naval Academy in Annapolis, Maryland. Argued against Bureau of Navigation insistence that it had no officers to detail to the college for the 1899 course, responding that "There is no more important duty on shore, except the absolutely essential professional administrative work, than the study of naval warfare," and circumvented the Bureau's opposition by arranging with the commander of the North Atlantic Squadron, Rear Admiral William T. Sampson, for Sampson's ships to spend the summer of 1899 anchored off Newport while their officers took the course.
9	Rear Admiral	French Ensor Chadwick		25 October 1900	16 November 1903	Oversaw the 1901 introduction of battle problems to be wargamed and studied as part of the curriculum and the 1901 publication of the first Naval War College "blue book" on international law. Became first occupant of the President's House in June 1903.
10	Captain	Charles S. Sperry		16 November 1903	24 May 1906	Developed an extensive knowledge of international law. To emphasize the professional character of the college rather than its function as a school, ordered in 1904 that when describing the college's academic activities, the words "course" and "class" were to be dropped and the term "conference" was to be used instead. Oversaw the opening of the college's new library (now Mahan Hall) in 1904 and the appointment of the college's first librarian in 1905.
11	Rear Admiral	John Porter Merrell		24 May 1906	6 October 1909	1908 summer course suspended by direction of President Theodore Roosevelt on 8 July 1908 so that the General Board of the United States Navy, the bureau chiefs of the United States Department of the Navy, and the college's staff and students could participate in a "Battleship Conference" at the college, with Roosevelt himself visiting to chair the conference for a day on 22 July 1908. Otherwise, Merrell chaired the conference. Secretary of the Navy Victor H. Metcalf closed the conference on 1 September 1908.
12	Rear Admiral	Raymond Perry Rodgers		6 October 1909	20 November 1911	Acting on a suggestion by Captain William Ledyard Rodgers – who had learned it at the United States Army War College – Raymond P. Rodgers introduced the "applicatory system" or "estimate of the situation" into Navy war planning, requiring that planning be developed through a four-step process involving "statement of mission, assessment of enemy forces and intentions, assessment of own forces, and evaluation of possible courses of action." The first edition of the college pamphlet Estimate of the Situation published under his direction in 1910 to teach the applicatory system to students. Established a 16-month "long course" to complement the four-month summer course at the college and allow sufficient time for in-depth study. Tended to favor more cautious approaches in planning for war with Japan. In 1911, Secretary of the Navy George von Lengerke Meyer removed war planning functions from the college, placing all planning responsibilities in the more aggressive General Board of the United States Navy.
13	Captain	William Ledyard Rodgers		20 November 1911	15 December 1913	Described the goal of his presidency as to broaden "the scope of the work to include studies of national policy as the foundation for laying out naval plans of expansion and also of logistics, organization, and administration of navies as the basis of strategy and tactics of battle." Second edition of the college pamphlet Estimate of the Situation published under his direction in 1911–1912. In 1913, instituted a three-course plan of instruction, consisting of a two-week elementary course, followed by a four-month preparatory course and then the long course instituted by Raymond P Rodgers but renamed the "War College Course." Introduced an option of taking the elementary course as a correspondence course to ease the detailing of officers to the college. Under his presidency, the college issued its first diplomas in 1913. Last non-flag officer to serve as college president, and the only president after 1906 who was not provided with the use of the President's House for his living quarters.
14	Rear Admiral	Austin Melvin Knight		15 December 1913	16 February 1917	Oversaw the abolition of the elementary and preparatory courses and the replacement of the 16-month "long course" with a 12-month "long course." Doubted the battle readiness of the fleet, viewing the Navy as operating at only 50 percent of efficiency, and advocated that "every effort of the fleet and every effort of the department [i.e., the United States Department of the Navy] in connection with the fleet should have for its sole aim the war efficiency of the fleet. Every effort which does not directly contribute to this end is in itself a wasteful expenditure of energy, and so far as it is a diversion from this end, is distinctly harmful." Also criticized the U.S. Navy, the United States Congress, and the American public as a whole for "asking, not what do we need for efficiency? but what can we afford to spend for efficiency?”" Encouraged the discussion of topics of international law and the effects of World War I on that law. Third edition of the college pamphlet Estimate of the Situation published under his direction in 1915.
15	Rear Admiral	William S. Sims		16 February 1917	28 April 1917	First of two terms as college president. Sims reported in the rank of captain, but was verbally authorized to wear the rank of rear admiral for the purposes of a secret mission to the United Kingdom in late March 1917. He arrived four days after the American declaration of war on 10 April 1917, thus thrusted into the role of enabling cooperation between the Royal Navy and United States Navy without significant guidance from the Navy Department. Largely by default, Sims received three-star rank in June of 1917 and then four-star rank in December of 1918 after the United States formally associated with the Entente Powers of World War I.
–	–	–	–	28 April 1917	10 April 1919	Naval War College served as a venue for supporting coastal defense planning and maritime strategy during World War I; notably Imperial Russian Navy Admiral Alexandr Kolchak met with the Commander Rufus Z. Johnson, USN, and the staff at the Naval War College during planning efforts to support operations on the European front in the First World War. This work later served as the basis for American expeditionary operations into Siberia during the Russian Revolution and subsequent civil war. Among other administrators presiding at the college: Commander (ret.) Charles P. Eaton, 1 May 1917 – 21 November 1917; Commodore (ret.) James P. Parker, 21 November 1917 – 17 March 1919; and Captain Reginald R. Belknap, 17 March 1919 – 11 April 1919.
16	Rear Admiral	William S. Sims		11 April 1919	14 October 1922	Having remained in the billet as college president while serving the temporary duty as commander, U.S. Naval Forces in Europe between 1917 and 1919, Sims requested orders to return to Newport. He fell out of step with the secretary of the Navy, Josephus Daniels, and the CNO, Admiral William S. Benson, during the so-called "Battle of Paris" which culminated in the Treaty of Versailles, but Sims still held the confidence of the assistant secretary of the Navy, Franklin D. Roosevelt. Returning to Newport, Sims arrived from Europe in four-star rank, but assumed two-stars upon resuming his presidency at the Naval War College. In this role, Sims recognized opportunities to learn from the experience of the First World War and, to this end, Sims drew from the ideas of Sir Julian Corbett. Sims established a "Historical Section" under his chief of staff for strategy, Captain Dudley W. Knox, and his former intelligence officers, reserve lieutenants Tracy Barrett Kittredge and Philip Whelpley in 1919. In addition, Sims joined efforts with Admiral Henry T. Mayo on the General Board of the Navy to sponsor the naval education board, which was composed of Knox, Captain Ernest J. King, and Commander William S. Pye. Using his position as President of the Naval War College, Sims championed efforts to reorganize the navy and make the war college a prerequisite for promotion to higher command. As a result, Sims again stood at odds of Navy Secretary Daniels. Seeking to learn from mistakes of the past, Sims openly challenged the propaganda narrative of Daniels by criticizing American naval performance in the First World War. His views appeared between the lines of his Pulitzer Prize-winning 1920 memoir The Victory at Sea. Sims also influenced the views articulated in the foreword by Rear Admiral Bradley Fiske in Tracy Barrett Kittredge's critique of Daniels, as published in the original documentary compilation Naval Lessons of the Great War. .
–	–	–	–	14 October 1922	3 November 1922	Captain DeWitt Blamer served as acting president between the departure of Sims and the arrival of Williams.
17	Rear Admiral	Clarence Stewart Williams		3 November 1922	5 September 1925	Oversaw establishment of the Junior Course, which in the 1950s would be renamed the Command and Staff Course. Fifth edition of the college pamphlet Estimate of the Situation published under his direction in 1924.
18	Rear Admiral	William V. Pratt		5 September 1925	17 September 1927	Made significant changes to the college's focus, expanding the course of study to encompass the totality of modern warfare rather than only strategy and tactics. Sixth edition of the college pamphlet Estimate of the Situation published under his direction in 1926.
19	Vice Admiral	Joel Robert Poinsett Pringle		19 September 1927	30 May 1930	Modified the college curriculum to reflect his belief that tactics flow from national, military, and naval strategy and that strategic and tactical decisions drive operations. Combined the college's logistics division with strategy and tactics to create an operations department that studied strategy, tactcs, and logistics as an integrated whole. Seventh edition of the college pamphlet Estimate of the Situation published under his direction in 1929.
–	–	–	–	30 May 1930	16 June 1930	Captain Samuel W. Bryant served as acting president between the departure of Pringle and the arrival of Laning.
20	Rear Admiral	Harris Laning		16 June 1930	13 May 1933	Placed an emphasis on the study of fleet tactics in the college curriculum with particular attention to the tactical operation of particular types of ships – i.e., battleships, cruisers, destroyers, and aircraft carriers – and later to tactical aerial bombing, as well as to historical study of the tactical use of each ship type and of bombing. Championed the use of statistics in the study of fleet tactics and established a research department for statistical studies at the college. Demanded "hard, perceptive, and innovate thinking" by students, but warned students that most of them did not achieve this because they appeared to view thinking about warfare as being complete by the time of their arrival at the college and limited themselves to "rehash[ing] the obvious" in their theses. Eighth edition of the college pamphlet Estimate of the Situation published under his direction in 1932.
–	–	–	–	13 May 1933	3 June 1933	Captain Adolphus Andrews served as acting president between the departure of Laning and the arrival of McNamee.
21	Rear Admiral	Luke McNamee		3 June 1933	29 May 1934	Fulfilled Sims's unrealized goal of establishing the Advanced Course for officers who had completed the senior course; taught by prominent educators rather than college staff, the Advanced Course studied matters of "international relations, major strategy, and the broader aspects of warfare, with particular attention to German and Japanese aspirations." Secured funding for the construction of Pringle Hall, which opened in 1934 and served as the college's wargaming center until 1957.
–	–	–	–	29 May 1934	18 June 1934	Captain H. D. Cooke served as acting president between the departure of McNamee and the arrival of Kalbfus.
22	Rear Admiral	Edward C. Kalbfus		18 June 1934	15 December 1936	First of two terms as college president. Staunch advocate of the college's value to the U.S. Navy. Exhibited great effort during both this term and his 1939–1942 term to further the college's objectives in the Navy and to increase its stature locally in the City of Newport, Rhode Island. Revised and expanded the college pamphlet Estimate of the Situation to create the textbook Sound Military Decision, which superseded the pamphlet.
–	–	–	–	15 December 1936	2 January 1937	Captain H. D. Cooke served as acting president between the departure of Kalbfus and the arrival of Snyder.
23	Rear Admiral	Charles Philip Snyder		2 January 1937	27 May 1939	Revised Sound Military Decision and issued his own version in May 1938. Started subscription campaign to fund a portrait of Alfred Thayer Mahan for Mahan Hall.
–	–	–	–	27 May 1939	30 June 1939	Captain John W. Wilcox, Jr. served as acting president between the departure of Snyder and the arrival of Kalbfus.
24	Admiral	Edward C. Kalbfus		30 June 1939	2 November 1942	Second of two terms as college president; he returned to complete his work on Sound Military Decision. Continued the advocacy for the college he had displayed in his first term and oversaw the college's 1942 production of Sound Military Decision. As a collateral duty, Kalbfus assumed duty as Director of Naval History by the direction of the Chief of Naval Operations, Admiral Ernest J. King, in June 1942. In this role, Kalbfus fused the efforts of the Historical Section of retired Captain Dudley W. Knox to synthesize the educational and research functions of the Naval War College strategic analysis functions of the Office of Naval Intelligence World War II. Kalbfus worked in close conjunction with his relief, Vice Admiral William S. Pye, to infuse historical analysis with wartime intelligence functions. At the recommendations of Kalbfus and Pye, the Combat Intelligence Division within the headquarters of Admiral King also materialized in the spring of 1943. The following year, Kalbfus established the Office of Naval History as a coequal function to the Office of Naval Intelligence and War Plans Division. His deputy, Knox, coincidentally received promotion to the wartime rank of commodore on the retired list. Together, Kalbfus and Knox also drove a subscription campaign in conjunction with the Naval Historical Foundation to fund a portrait of Alfred Thayer Mahan.
25	Vice Admiral	William S. Pye		2 November 1942	1 March 1946	Served as Naval War College President during the World War II years. During his tenure, the college conducted abbreviated courses that trained officers in the practical requirements for duty on a staff or in command while serving at sea or with the shore establishment. In March 1944, United States Secretary of the Navy Frank Knox appointed Pye to head a board of officers – referred to as the "Pye Board" – to study naval professional military education; it recommended, among other things, that the Navy establish three levels of officer education at the college and vastly increase the number of officers attending the college. The Navy approved little of what the Pye Board recommended, but a subsequent board headed by Rear Admiral James L. Holloway, Jr., took into account the work of the Pye Board. Pye remained on active service on the retired list as a vice admiral while assisting the development of the Army-Navy Staff College (ANSCOL) at the Naval War College. Foreign naval officers from the Allied navies also completed the ANSCOL curriculum during the war. The renowned maritime historian, Dr. Robert G. Albion, and Commodore Dudley W. Knox also provided lectures and advisory support to Pye as the Naval War College directly supported the functions of the Chief of Naval Operations, Admiral King. Having been the key architect of the Combat Intelligence Division within King's headquarters, Pye built upon the precedence set by the Historical Section in the Sims era and the functions of the Office of Naval History to organize what became the Battle Studies Group. Pye relinquished command upon the arrival of four-star Admiral Raymond A. Spruance on 1 March 1946.
26	Admiral	Raymond A. Spruance		1 March 1946	1 July 1948	Assigned while awaiting promotion to five-star rank, which failed to materialize due to the unification debates ongoing in Congress, which later culminated in the so-called 'Revolt of the Admirals' and the subsequent suicide of the former Navy Secretary - Secretary of Defense James Forrestal. Placing an emphasis on the practical importance of education for naval professionals, Spruance expanded the curriculum; established academic chairs for a distinguished civilian historian and a political scientist. Among others, Samuel Eliot Morison and Robert G. Albion frequently participated in college activities, as did retired Commodore Dudley W. Knox. Spruance also set administrative foundations for what would become the Naval War College Press and Naval War College Review
–	–	–	–	1 July 1948	1 November 1948	Rear Admiral Allen Edward Smith served as acting president between the departure of Spruance and the arrival of Beary.
27	Vice Admiral	Donald B. Beary		1 November 1948	28 May 1950	Building upon experience as the chief architect of the Antisubmarine University system in World War II, Beary fused the functions of the Office of Naval History with those of the Naval War College to foster Global Strategy Discussions of the 1950s and Current Strategy Forum. In addition, Beary solicited funding from the retired five-star admirals to establish chairs in their names for the college to host scholars and enliven debates within the classroom setting of the Naval War College. Beary specifically dedicated these reforms to Fleet Admiral Ernest J. King in the 1949 booklet Prospectus of the Naval War College.
–	–	–	–	28 May 1950	1 December 1950	The college had two acting presidents – Rear Admiral Thomas R. Cooley from 28 May 1950 to 17 October 1950 and Captain Harry D. Felt from 17 October 1950 to 1 December 1950 – between the departure of Beary and the arrival of Conolly.
28	Vice Admiral	Richard L. Conolly		1 December 1950	2 November 1953	Made major reforms to allow the college to build on the insights gained during World War II, and restored the civilian academic chairs of history and political science originally created by Spruance. When the Chief of Naval Operations dissolved the Office of Naval History in 1952, Conolly responded by soliciting Fleet Admirals Ernest J. King, Chester W. Nimitz, William D. Leahy, and William F. Halsey, Jr. Retired admirals Kalbfus and Pye also operated in conjunction with Commodore Knox and the Naval Historical Foundation to assist efforts in the formal establishment of became the King Chair of Maritime History, the Nimitz Chair of Political Economy, the Leahy Chair of Diplomacy, and the Halsey Chair of Naval Strategy and Command. In addition, Conolly championed efforts to write legislation under Title 10 to empower the Secretary of the Navy to appoint civilian scholars under the provisions of Excepted Service at the recommendation of the president of the Naval War College.
–	–	–	–	2 November 1953	3 May 1954	Rear Admiral Thomas H. Robbins served as acting president between the departure of Conolly and the arrival of McCormick. Notably, Robbins also formally implemented Conolly's plans to appoint "named" chairs for history, political economy, diplomacy, and naval strategy and command.
29	Vice Admiral	Lynde D. McCormick		3 May 1954	16 August 1956	Having qualified in submarines in the First World War era, McCormick served as to the staff of Chief of Naval Operations Ernest J. King as assistant chief of naval operations for logistics plans, with additional duty as chairman of the Joint Logistics Committee of the Joint Chiefs of Staff during the Second World War. He assisted efforts to implement reconstruction during the initial stages of occupation in Japan and through the initial stages of the Chinese Civil War. McCormick then served in four-star rank as the global commander of antisubmarine forces before assuming duty as Commander in Chief, Atlantic Fleet. From this experience, McCormick continued efforts to synthesize the Naval War College curriculum with global reconstruction strategy by working in close conjunction with Retired Rear Admiral Henry Eccles to educate senior-ranking officers of foreign navies. To these ends, McCormick used the newly concluded provisions of Title 10 to enact the Excepted Service appointments of civilian scholars. While civilians had served at the Naval War College in the commissioned naval rank of professor before the establishment of the Department of Defense in 1947, the provisions articulated in the newly ratified legal provisions under Title 10 of U.S. Code enabled McCormick to make the first Excepted Service appointments under his delegated authority in 1954. McCormick's tenure proved truly significant, although he became the first Naval War College president to die in office.
–	–	–	–	16 August 1956	5 September 1956	Rear Admiral Thomas H. Robbins served as acting president between the death of McCormick and his own assumption of the presidency as McCormick's successor.
30	Rear Admiral	Thomas H. Robbins, Jr.		5 September 1956	1 August 1957	Instituted the senior foreign officer course created by his deceased predecessor McCormick
31	Vice Admiral	Stuart H. Ingersoll		13 August 1957	30 June 1960	Brought a broad background in post-World War II planning and leadership in unified commands to the college; oversaw the changeover of the college's wargaming from manual to computerized processes. Served on the Civil War Centennial Commission while at the college, beginning in autumn 1957.
32	Vice Admiral	Bernard L. Austin		30 June 1960	31 July 1964	Four-year presidency was the longest in the college's history at the time; played a key role in creating the Naval Command College for senior foreign naval officers; served in 1963 as president of a board of inquiry looking into the loss of the submarine USS Thresher (SSN-593).
33	Vice Admiral	Charles L. Melson		31 July 1964	25 January 1966	Supported a greater emphasis on basic naval subjects; expanded the use of the Naval Electronic Warfare Simulator (NEWS) in the college's wargaming; oversaw the construction of an addition to Mahan Hall for an expanded library collection
–	–	–	–	25 January 1966	15 February 1966	Rear Admiral Francis D. Nuessle served as acting president between the departure of Melson and the arrival of Hayward.
34	Vice Admiral	John T. Hayward		15 February 1966	30 August 1968	Introduced a program to realign the college's curriculum along the lines of civilian colleges; began a program for appropriate physical facilities that would lead to the construction of Spruance Hall, Conolly Hall, and Hewitt Hall during the 1970s
35	Vice Admiral	Richard G. Colbert		30 August 1968	17 August 1971	Consolidated and strengthened the curriculum established by his predecessor; set in motion the construction of Spruance, Conolly, and Hewitt Halls; laid the groundwork for a Naval Staff College course for intermediate-level foreign officers; established the Naval War College Foundation; instituted the International Seapower Symposia, a biennial international meeting of the chiefs of navies
36	Vice Admiral	Benedict J. Semmes, Jr.		17 August 1971	30 June 1972	Shifted the college's emphasis from foreign and international affairs to management concepts
37	Vice Admiral	Stansfield Turner		30 June 1972	9 August 1974	Charged by Chief of Naval Operations Admiral Elmo Zumwalt to change the college radically by establishing a rigorous and challenging curriculum which would give military officers understanding outside their own narrow specialities and improve their ability to analyze problems effectively; created the three-course curriculum still in use at the college; required the analysis of historical case studies; established a full-time teaching and research faculty with credentials from the best universities
38	Vice Admiral	Julien J. LeBourgeois		9 August 1974	1 April 1977	Consolidated and refined his predecessor's radical curriculum changes; laid the groundwork for the creation of the Center for Advanced Research; initiated the establishment of a museum of naval history and the U.S. Navy's regional history in Founders Hall
39	Rear Admiral	Huntington Hardisty		1 April 1977	13 October 1977	During his six-month presidency – the shortest in the college's history – he worked conscientiously to carry out the academic programs his predecessor had initiated
40	Vice Admiral	James B. Stockdale		13 October 1977	22 August 1979	Expanded the college's elective course offerings, including courses unrelated to naval warfare; taught a course on military ethics inspired by his own experience as a prisoner-of-war during the Vietnam War
41	Rear Admiral	Edward F. Welch, Jr.		22 August 1979	17 August 1982	Emphasized fleet operations in the college's curriculum and wargaming; instituted the Global Wargame; established a program under which naval officer students could earn master's degrees working with other colleges and universities in the area
–	–	–	–	17 August 1982	14 October 1982	Captain David Self served as acting president between the departure of Welch and the arrival of Service.
42	Vice Admiral	James E. Service		14 October 1982	12 July 1985	Presided over the college's centennial, the opening of an enlarged museum in Founders Hall after a two-year renovation, and the publication of Sailors and Scholars, a history of the college's first 100 years
–	–	–	–	12 July 1985	8 August 1985	Captain Robert Watts served as acting president between the departure of Service and the arrival of Marryott.
43	Rear Admiral	Ronald F. Marryott		8 August 1985	12 August 1986	Promoted the college's role in developing strategic ideas and refining concepts
–	–	–	–	12 August 1986	2 September 1986	Captain Robert Watts served as acting president between the departure of Marryott and the arrival of Baldwin.
44	Rear Admiral	John A. Baldwin, Jr.		2 September 1986	11 August 1987	Initiated the process for accreditation of the college to grant master's degrees, which it would receive in 1991; established the Institute for Strategic Studies to facilitate accreditation and retain talented faculty; and restored the college library after a fire inflicted serious damage on it.
45	Rear Admiral	Ronald J. Kurth		11 August 1987	17 July 1990	Testified before the United States Congress about the effect on military education of the Goldwater-Nichols Act; conceived the idea that would lead to the accreditation of the college to grant master's degrees; began the long-term effort to construct a new building
46	Rear Admiral	Joseph C. Strasser		17 July 1990	29 June 1995	During a historic five year tenure as President of the Naval War College; oversaw the college's transition from the Cold War era as the Warsaw Pact and Soviet Union collapsed; achieved accreditation of the college by the New England Association of Schools and Colleges to grant a Master's degree in National Security and Strategic Studies; acquired Congressional approval for the construction of the Strategic Maritime Research Center, McCarty-Little Hall; inaugurated combined Russia-United Kingdom-United States (RUKUS) wargames
47	Rear Admiral	James R. Stark		29 June 1995	24 July 1998	Reorganized the curriculum of the College of Continuing Education to allow officers to complete the course in a single shore tour; oversaw the construction of McCarty-Little Hall; began planning for a new library and administration building; incorporated the Naval Warfare Development Center into the college's operations
48	Vice Admiral	Arthur K. Cebrowski		24 July 1998	22 August 2001	Introduced network-centric warfare into the college's curriculum and research and Information Age warfighting concepts into its wargaming; introduced "transformation" to the college so that the college could serve as an agent of change for Navy leadership grappling with rapid changes in warfare; shifted the college's geographic focus of study to Asia and the Pacific Ocean
49	Rear Admiral	Rodney P. Rempt		22 August 2001	9 July 2003	Refocused the college's efforts against threats made apparent by the terrorist attacks of 11 September 2001; initiated homeland security games involving local, state, and United States Government agencies; raised the college's prominence and increased the number of students in its various programs; conducted a wide-ranging review of U.S. Navy graduate and professional education policy that resulted in many changes; oversaw the college's production of a series of influential point papers for the senior leadership of the United States and the United States Armed Forces
50	Rear Admiral	Ronald A. Route		9 July 2003	12 August 2004	Sharpened the college's focus on mission and relevance; initiated research, analysis, and wargaming to address key operational concerns of the U.S. Navy such as ballistic missile defense and antisubmarine warfare and established the Halsey Scholars, an advanced research program for selected students; facilitated discussions between retired Soviet Navy officers and their American counterparts on Cold War naval history
51	Rear Admiral	Jacob L. Shuford		12 August 2004	6 November 2008	Directed extensive restructuring of the basic curriculum; initiated the Joint Force Maritime Component Commander Course for flag officers, the Maritime Staff Operators Course, and the Operational Planner Course; led the college as it played the key role in designing the process for establishing a new national maritime strategy and in providing the geostrategic analysis to support it; reinstituted Title 10 wargaming; initiated concept-development efforts to explore important warfare issues such as maritime ballistic missile defense, antisubmarine warfare, homeland defense organization, and the command and control of maritime forces; engaged in extensive diplomacy to establish an international network of naval colleges that could collaborate on the study of maritime security issues
52	Rear Admiral	James P. "Phil" Wisecup		6 November 2008	30 March 2011	Inaugurated the Chinese-language library for the China Maritime Studies Institute, hosted the Current Strategy Fora, co-hosted the Nineteenth International Seapower Symposium – the largest gathering of naval leadership in world history – and oversaw the college's 125th anniversary commemoration.
53	Rear Admiral	John N. Christenson		30 March 2011	2 July 2013	Stimulated War College innovation, broke new ground in Navy leader education, expanded international outreach, and increased support to fleet operational-level training through his promotion of faculty research and war-gaming. During his tenure, the college provided hands-on assistance to fleet staffs in venues such as the Fleet Synchronization Conference, Current Strategy Forum, Leader Development Strategy, and the International Seapower Symposium.
54	Rear Admiral	Walter E. Carter Jr.		2 July 2013	8 July 2014	Designated by the Chief of Naval Operations to oversee all leadership and ethics training throughout the U.S. Navy, his white paper "Ethics in the Navy."
55	Rear Admiral	P. Gardner Howe, III		8 July 2014	25 July 2016	First Navy SEAL to lead the Naval War College. Focused the college on preparing leaders for the challenges of an increasingly complex operational environment and the rise of near-peer competitors, including the reinvigoration of a sense of the Navy as a profession and leading the Navy's initiatives to improve leader development.
56	Rear Admiral	Jeffrey A. Harley		25 July 2016	10 June 2019	Rear Admiral Jeffrey Harley focused on fixing problems of Professional Military Education (PME) as a leading advisor to the Secretary of the Navy's "Education for Seapower" vision. He simultaneously emphasized the Chief of Naval Operations directive to fix administrative problems within the Naval War College. During his three-year tenure in Newport, Harley coordinated efforts to advance the future of Professional Military Education (PME), as articulated in the Secretary of the Navy's "Education for Sea Power" and the Chief of Naval Operations "Design for Maintaining Maritime Superiority." Coincident with the transition from the Global War on Terror to global maritime stabilization operations, Harley's efforts at the Naval War College focused upon what he called, "navalizing," international and joint discussions of policy, strategy, and command. He organized a new future-focused curriculum for cyber and space education. Harley also took particular interest in the writings of his previous Naval War College presidents in an ongoing effort to synthesize the past with contemporary discussions of future strategy and command. In particular, the historical works Mahan and Sims became a focus of his effort to reorganize the functions of the Naval War College archives and museum to support original historical research with an applied focus on issues of immediate concern to contemporary fleet practitioners. Inspired by the example of Sims and the "Historical Section" of the Naval War College of the 1920s and 1930s, Harley considered history to be an "operational function" which enabled the formulation of current plans, or what he called an "unclassified way of coordinating intelligence with a strategic end in mind." Harley was the first president to host a member of the Japanese royal family when Princess Akikko of Mikasa visited for research collaboration with historians at the Naval War College. Harley also concluded formal agreements for continued historical collaborations with the Japanese Self-Defense Force, Royal Australian Navy, and the War Studies Department at King's College London in conjunction with the Corbett 100 global historical initiatives. Through these efforts, Harley fostered global collaboration and future fleet requirements through ongoing operational collaborations with foreign navies and the CNO International Fellows Program. At CNO direction, Harley established the International Maritime Staff Officers Course. The CNO, Admiral John Richardson, formally highlighted these achievements after Harley's retirement after nearly forty years on active service. Having earlier served as an enlisted sailor, Harley commanded multiple warships and then earned the Bronze Star Medal for his service in combat and in multinational operations at sea and ashore. After he attained flag rank, Harley served as Officer in Charge of the White House Situation Room. Harley's tenure at the Naval War College inspired his effort to complete doctoral studies in history. Following his retirement, Harley earned his PhD in Politics and International Affairs from the University of Reading in 2021 and also served as a Senior Fellow at the Center of Maritime Security.
–	–	–	–	10 June 2019	1 August 2019	Provost Lewis Duncan served as acting president between the departure of Harley and the arrival of Chatfield.
57	Rear Admiral	Shoshana S. Chatfield		1 August 2019	23 June 2023	The 57th President of the Naval War College, Rear Admiral Shoshana S. Chatfield completed an extended four-year tenure during a period of significant uncertainty as punctuated by the 2019 Coronavirus Pandemic (COVID-19). Chatfield earned her wings as a Naval Aviator and completed multiple squadron tours with deployments to the western Pacific and greater Middle East regions. Her service ashore included assignments to the Joint Staff, the North Atlantic Treaty Organization (NATO), and then in an educational capacity at the U.S. Air Force Academy. Having earned her master's degree at the Kennedy School of Government at Harvard University while ashore, she also subsequently earned Education Doctorate (Ed.D) at the University of San Diego. Promoted to flag rank in 2015, Chatfield commanded Joint Region Marianas in Guam before reporting as the first woman to serve as President of the Naval War College in 2019. Chatfield managed the challenges associated with the COVID-19 pandemic, using cybernetic means for sustained operations in the virtual classroom setting. Chatfield also drove efforts to foster a shared understanding of the complex and dynamic global security environment through examination of women’s influence and experience as stakeholders and catalysts of change alongside men in conjunction with the Women, Peace, and Security (WPS) initiatives. Given infrastructure and building maintenance priorities, Chatfield closed the institution's archives and associated historical collections to enable construction projects to proceed on the National Historic District of Coaster's Harbor Island in 2020. Chatfield also focused upon modernization and infrastructure improvements for the facilities on and around the Naval War College campus. As the COVID-19 pandemic subsided during her closing months in office, Chatfield then refocused efforts to expand global strategic partnerships and the expansion of NATO following the Russian invasion of Ukraine in 2022. Chatfield's subsequent nomination for promotion to the rank of vice admiral also coincided with her assignment to serve as representative to the NATO Military Committee in 2023.
58	Rear Admiral	Peter A. Garvin		23 June 2023	9 August 2024	As a graduate with merit from the United States Naval Academy with the Class of 1989, Garvin earned a Bachelor of Science in Aerospace Engineering (Astronautics) before earning qualification as a Naval aviator. He is a 2005 graduate of the National War College, earning a Master of Science in National Security Strategy and a 2015 alumnus of the Massachusetts Institute of Technology Seminar XXI. His operational assignments include service with the “Pelicans” of Patrol Squadron (VP) 45, where he was the 1995 Association of Naval Aviation Pilot of the Year; department head with the “Mad Foxes” of VP-5; navigator aboard USS Kearsarge (LHD 3), where he served as flag navigator for the embarked Amphibious Squadron (PHIBRON) 6; executive and 59th commanding officer of the “Fighting Tigers” of VP-8; and commander of Patrol and Reconnaissance Wing (CPRW) 10. His shore assignments include flag lieutenant to Commander, Patrol Wings Atlantic (CPWL), Commander, Task Force (CTF) 84; instructor pilot at the P-3 fleet replacement squadron, VP-30; Washington placement officer at the Bureau of Naval Personnel (PERS 441); executive officer for the director, Operational Plans and Joint Force Development Directorate (J-7), Joint Staff; federal executive fellow at the Council on Foreign Relations (CFR); undersea warfare branch head in the assessments division (N81) and deputy director, unmanned warfare systems (N99) on the Office of the Chief of Naval Operations staff; and executive assistant to the vice chairman, Joint Chiefs of Staff. As a flag officer, he served as the 22nd commander of Navy Recruiting Command, commander, Patrol and Reconnaissance Group and Patrol and Reconnaissance Group Pacific, and most recently as the 20th commander, Naval Education and Training Command. Having relieved Vice Admiral Shoshana Chatfield in June 2023, Garvin received nomination for promotion to Vice Admiral and detached as President of the Naval War College in August 2024. Gavin subsequently assumed the Presidency at National Defense University in conjunction with his confirmation to his present three-star rank of vice admiral.
59	Rear Admiral	Darryl L. Walker		9 August 2024	Incumbent	Airpower defined the enlisted experience of Darryl "D-Day" Walker, as he earlier enlisted in the United States Air Force in 1985 as an Air Traffic Controller. He subsequently received his commission in the United States Navy through the Naval Aviation Officer Candidate School and was designated a Naval Flight Officer in 1992. He is a graduate of Embry-Riddle Aeronautical University and the United States Naval War College. D-Day fulfilled various operational tours in the Pacific and Arabian Gulf, include service as the Commander and Executive Officer of the “Cougars” VAQ-139, deployed onboard USS Ronald Reagan (CVN 76), as well as the Commodore and Deputy Commodore of the Electronic Attack Wing United States Pacific Fleet, flying the EA-18G Growler. He has amassed an impressive 3900 flight hours and 696 carrier-arrested landings throughout his career. Walker’s shore assignments include deputy director, PERS-43; NAE Diversity Director; Chief of Naval Operations Strategic Studies Group; chief of staff to the Chief Information Officer, Secretary of Defense; Executive Assistant to the 11th Vice Chairman of the Joint Chiefs of Staff; and Executive Assistant to the 32nd Chief of Naval Operations. As a Flag Officer, Walker served as the Deputy Director of Operations (J-3), U.S. Cyber Command, and most recently as the Deputy Commander of Joint Force Headquarters-Cyber (Navy), United States TENTH Fleet. In August 2024, Walker assumed duty as the president of the Naval War College.
