= Charles Stockton =

Charles Herbert Stockton
- Charles H. Stockton
- Born: October 13, 1845; Philadelphia, Pennsylvania, U.S.
- Died: May 31, 1924 (aged 78); Washington, D.C., U.S.
- Military career
- Allegiance: United States
- Branch: United States Navy
- Service years: 1865–1907
- Rank: Rear Admiral
- Commands: USS Thetis; USS Yorktown; USS Kentucky
- Other work: President of the George Washington University; Lecturer in International Law

Charles Herbert Stockton (October 13, 1845 – May 31, 1924) was a rear admiral in the United States Navy and the U.S. Navy's first uniformed expert in international law. Stockton served as the President of the Naval War College, and later served as President of the George Washington University from 1910 to 1918

== Early life and education ==
The son of Reverend William Rodgers Stockton and his wife, Emma Trout Gross Stockton, Charles Stockton was educated at Germantown Academy and Freeland Academy before entering the United States Naval Academy, then temporarily located at Newport, Rhode Island. He graduated from the academy in 1865.

== Naval career ==
Stockton served on the North Pacific Station, 1865–69, then in the sloop Brooklyn, flagship of the European Squadron, 1870–73. After instruction at the Naval Torpedo Station at Newport, Rhode Island, in 1873, he had a variety of ship and shore duties relating to that area, served at the Hydrographic Office, 1875–76, and lectured at the Naval War College, 1887–88. In 1890–91, he commanded the steam whaler Thetis, the first vessel to follow the entire coastline of Alaska, and published an article (1890) on this cruise in the new National Geographic Magazine as well as technical papers on Bering Strait ice conditions, before cruising off El Salvador and Guatemala during the 1890 war.

In 1891, he became President of the Naval War College and supervised construction of its first purpose-built building, Luce Hall. In 1892–93, he handed the completed building over to its returning president, Alfred Thayer Mahan, and became the college's lecturer in international law, completing Harvard Professor Freeman Snow's unfinished book on the subject in 1895. After commanding the gunboat Yorktown on the Asiatic Station, 1895–97, he returned to become president, Naval War College, 1898–1900. Recognized as the U.S. Navy's first uniformed expert on international law, he remained at the college until 1901 to write the first code of Law of Naval Warfare.

He commanded the battleship Kentucky, 1901–03, and served as U.S. naval attaché in London, 1903–05.

== Civilian career ==
Stockton retired as a serving naval officer in 1907, and, in 1908–09, was appointed as First U.S. Delegate to the London Naval Conference that resulted in the London Declaration concerning the Laws of Naval War. Upon his return from London, he became president, The George Washington University, 1910–1918. On stepping down from that post, Stockton continued as lecturer in International Law at The George Washington University until 1921. He is commemorated in Stockton Hall at The George Washington University and in the academic chair occupied by the Charles H. Stockton Professor of International Law at the U.S. Naval War College.

== Personal life ==
Stockton married Cornelia Carter on 23 June 1875. Less than a year later, on 1 July 1876, Cornelia died, the day after giving birth to their daughter, Cornelia Carter Stockton. Stockton married Pauline Lethilhon on 23 November 1880, and had two further children; Herbert King Stockton (b. 1882) and Helen King Stockton (b. 1886).

== Dates of rank ==
- Midshipman - 14 November 1861.
- Graduated Naval Academy - September, 1865.
- Ensign - 1 December 1866.
- Master - 12 March 1868.
- Lieutenant - 26 March 1869.
- Lieutenant Commander - 15 November 1881.
- Commander - 3 April 1892.
- Captain - 8 July 1899.
- Rear Admiral - 7 January 1906
- Retired List - 13 October 1907

== See also ==
- Fort Stockton (San Diego, California)

Military offices
Preceded by Alfred Thayer Mahan	President of the Naval War College; 1893-1893	Succeeded by Henry Clay Taylor
Preceded by Caspar F. Goodrich	President of the Naval War College; 1898-1900	Succeeded by French Ensor Chadwick
