= Stuart H. Ingersoll =

United States Navy admiral

Stuart Howe Ingersoll
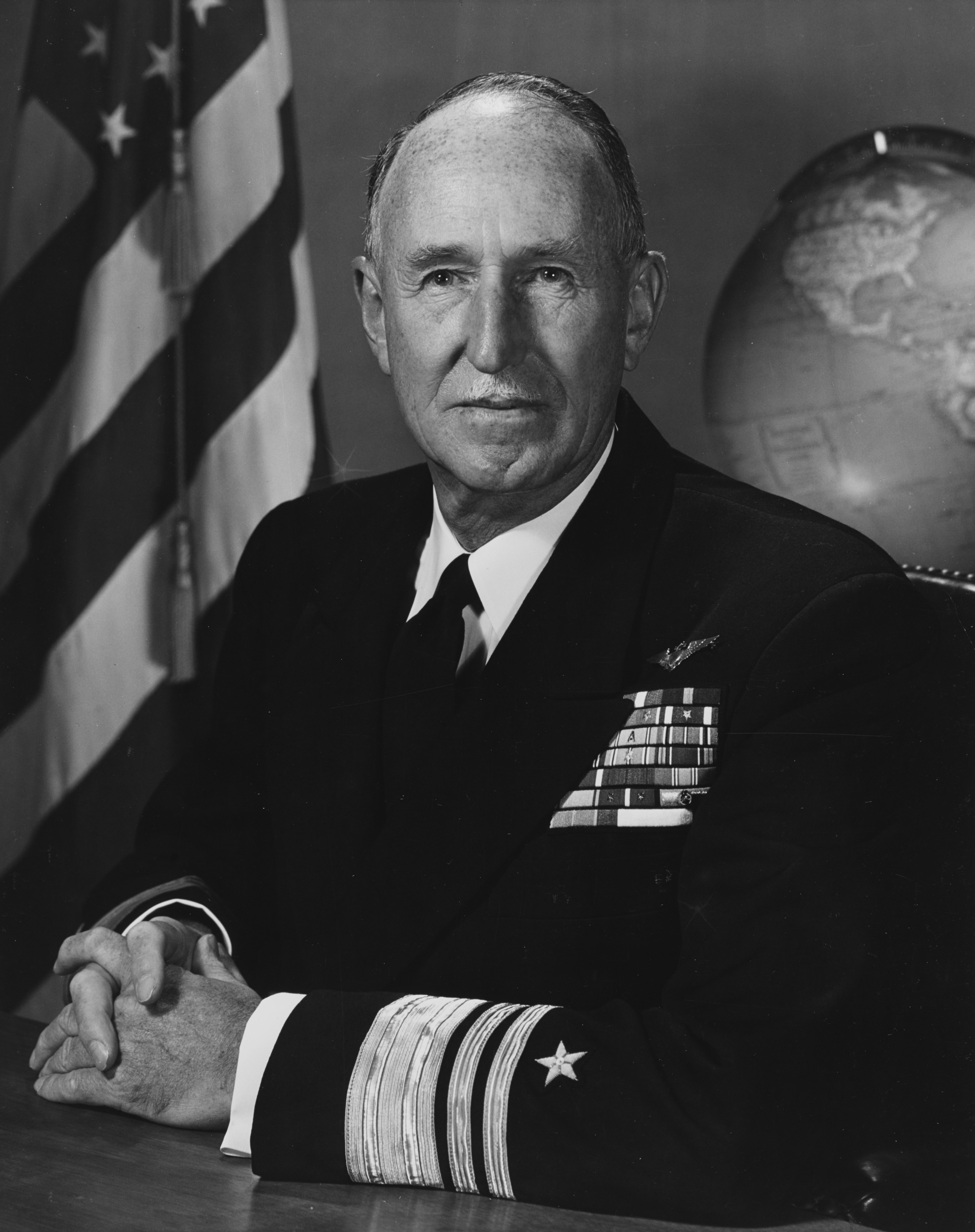
- Ingersoll in 1955
- Born: June 3, 1898; Springfield, Massachusetts, US
- Died: January 29, 1983 (aged 84); Newport, Rhode Island, US
- Military career
- Allegiance: United States
- Branch: United States Navy
- Service years: 1920–1960
- Rank: Vice Admiral
- Commands: Patrol Squadron 18/13/26 (VP-18/13/26) (see text); USS Monterey (CVL-26); Fleet Air Wing 2; Carrier Division 4; United States Seventh Fleet; United States Taiwan Defense Command; President of the Naval War College
- Conflicts: World War II; Battle of the Atlantic; Pacific War; Battle of the Philippine Sea; Battle of Guam; Leyte Campaign; Battle of Leyte Gulf; Cold War
- Awards: Navy Cross; Distinguished Service Medal (two awards); Legion of Merit (two awards) with "V" Device; Navy Commendation Medal (two awards); World War I Victory Medal with Escort Clasp; American Defense Service Medal with Atlantic Clasp; American Campaign Medal; European-African-Middle Eastern Campaign Medal (two awards); Asiatic-Pacific Campaign Medal (three awards); World War II Victory Medal; National Defense Service Medal; Philippine Liberation Medal (three awards); Order of the British Empire

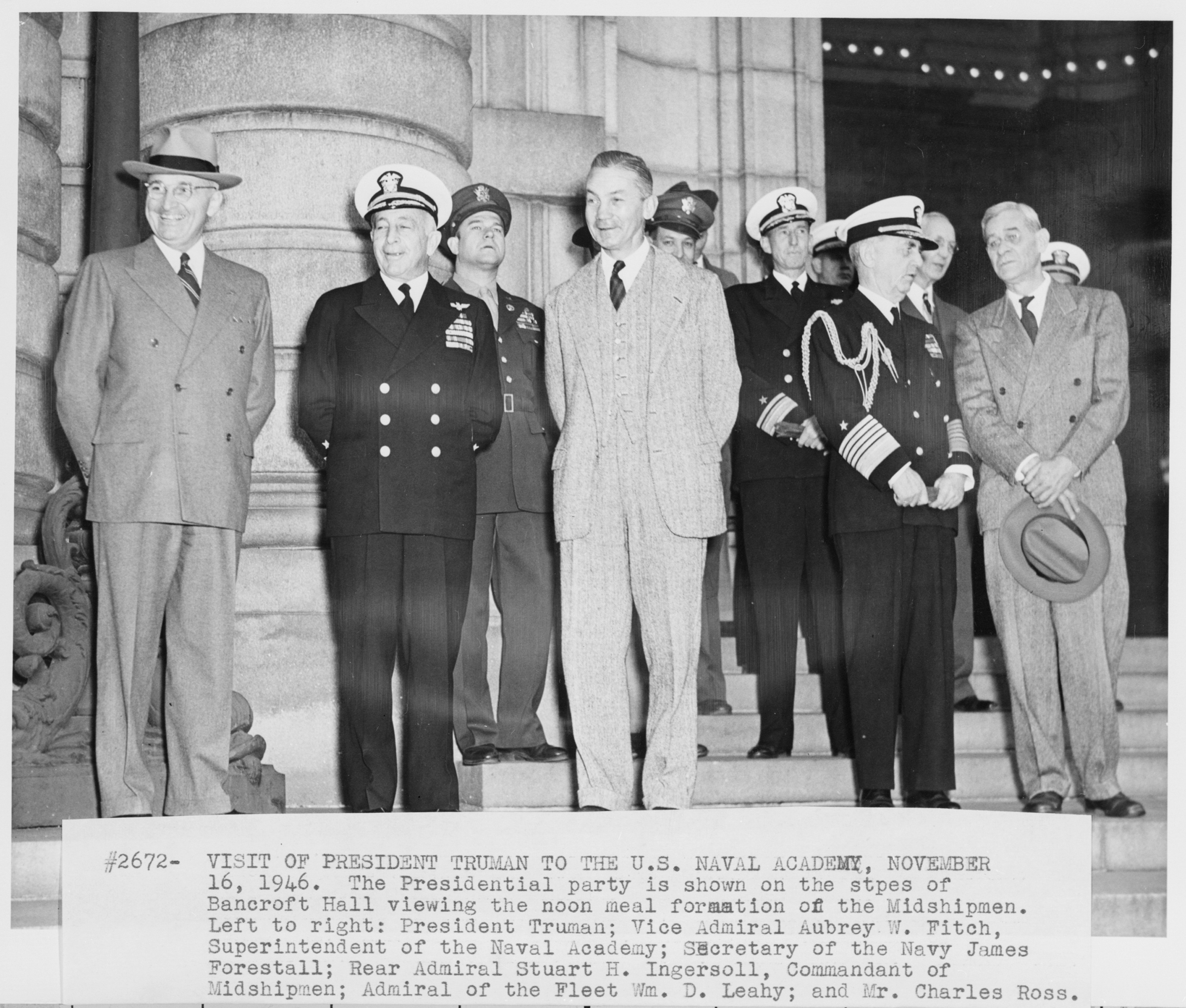
Ingersoll as a rear admiral and United States Naval Academy Commandant of Midshipmen during a visit by President Harry S Truman on 16 November 1946. Left to right are Truman, Academy Superintendent Vice Admiral Aubrey W. Fitch, presidential physician General Wallace Graham, Secretary of the Navy James Forrestal, Ingersoll, Fleet Admiral William D. Leahy, and Presidential press secretary Charlie Ross.

Stuart Howe Ingersoll (June 3, 1898 – January 29, 1983) was a vice admiral of the United States Navy. He was a naval aviator whose career included service as an aircraft carrier commander during World War II and tours as commander-in-chief of the United States Seventh Fleet, President of the Naval War College, and Commandant of Midshipmen at the United States Naval Academy.

== Early life ==
Ingersoll was born on 3 June 1898 in Springfield, Massachusetts. Appointed from Maine to the United States Naval Academy at Annapolis, Maryland, he was admitted to the school on 19 July 1917. The United States entered World War I on 6 April 1917, and he arrived at the academy as a member of the Class of 1921 at a time when the school's student body and staff were growing rapidly to meet the need for naval officers in the expanding wartime navy. On 4 March 1917, the United States Congress authorized the academy to shorten its four-year program to three years, with the school year starting earlier than usual, the second class (i.e., junior year) deleted, and instruction normally held that year taught in the plebe (i.e., freshman) or first class (i.e., senior year) instead. The top 286 members of the Class of 1921 — Ingersoll among them — graduated after only three years, on 3 June 1920, and were commissioned as ensigns on 5 June 1920, while the other 280 members of the class graduated in 1921 as the academy returned to its four-year curriculum. Ingersoll's Naval Academy years included a cruise on the battleship USS Missouri (BB-11).

== Naval career ==
=== Pre-World War II ===
Ingersoll reported aboard the battleship USS North Dakota (BB-29) on 8 July 1920 to begin his first tour of duty as a naval officer. In 1921, he transferred to the destroyer USS Cassin (DD-43). After Cassin was decommissioned in 1922, he transferred to the destroyer USS Hopkins (DD-249), which operated from Constantinople in the waters of the Ottoman Empire during his tour. Promoted to lieutenant (junior grade) on 5 June 1923, he was serving aboard the destroyer USS Sicard (DD-346) in the United States Asiatic Fleet by the beginning of 1924. During his tour, Sicard supported the first aerial circumnavigation of the world by four United States Army Air Service Douglas World Cruiser aircraft in 1924. He transferred to the destroyer USS Borie (DD-215) in 1925.

Detaching from Borie in July 1925, Ingersoll reported to Naval Air Station Pensacola in Pensacola, Florida, on 1 August 1925 for aviation training. He qualified as a naval aviator, was promoted to lieutenant on 1 July 1926, and on 1 September 1926 reported for duty as a pilot with Bombing Squadron 1 (VB-1). Before the end of 1926 he began duty aboard the seaplane tender USS Wright (AV-1), and in 1927 he left Wright to become a pilot in Torpedo Squadron 1 (VT-1), remaining with the squadron until 1928. By the beginning of 1929 he was a pilot in Bombing Squadron One (VB-1B) in the Battle Fleet. He left the squadron that year to serve aboard the battleship USS Maryland, detaching from her in June 1929.

Ingersoll reported for duty at Naval Support Activity Hampton Roads at Naval Air Station Norfolk in Norfolk, Virginia, on 28 July 1929. On 1 July 1931, he returned to sea, beginning a tour aboard the aircraft carrier USS Langley (CV-1). Detaching from Langley in June 1933, he returned to Naval Air Station Norfolk on 29 June 1933 for another tour there. He returned to the fleet on 26 July 1935, beginning a tour with Bombing Squadron 5B (VB-5B). He was promoted to lieutenant commander on 1 July 1936, by which time he had completed the Naval War College correspondence course in naval strategy and naval tactics.

Leaving VB-5B in December 1936, Ingersoll reported on 31 December 1936 for duty in connection with the new aircraft carrier USS Yorktown (CV-5), then fitting out at Newport News Shipbuilding and Drydock Company in Newport News, Virginia. He detached from Yorktown prior to her commissioning, and on 30 September 1937 he assumed command of Patrol Squadron 18 (VP-18), a new squadron established at Naval Air Station Seattle in Seattle, Washington on 1 September 1937. Under his command, the squadron took delivery of its first aircraft, 15 Consolidated P2Y-3 flying boats, on 15 January 1938, was redesignated Patrol Squadron 13 (VP-13) on 1 July 1939, and was redesignated Patrol Squadron 26 (VP-26) on 11 December 1939.

Ingersoll left the squadron in July 1940 and began a tour with the Bureau of Aeronautics in Washington, D.C. Promoted to commander on 1 April 1941. he became the assistant naval attache in London 16 April 1941.

=== World War II ===
The United States entered World War II on 7 December 1941. Early in 1942, Ingersoll was the air operations officer on the staff of Rear Admiral Arthur L. Bristol Jr., who was commander of the U.S. Navy Support Force at Argentia in the Dominion of Newfoundland, the force responsible for U.S. Navy convoy escort of Allied and neutral shipping in the North Atlantic Ocean west of Iceland. During this period, U.S. Navy PBO Hudson patrol aircraft from Argentia sank the first two German submarines (U-boats) sunk by the United States Armed Forces during World War II. Advanced to the temporary rank of captain on 20 June 1942, Ingersoll had shore duty at Naval Air Station Anacostia in Washington, D.C., from 1942 to 1943, when he transferred to the escort aircraft carrier USS Card (CVE-11), which operated as flagship of Task Group 21.14, a hunter-killer group operating against German submarines in the North Atlantic. In October 1943, he received the Legion of Merit for his tour aboard Card, the citation reading in part:

...During a period of intense anti-submarine activities in the North Atlantic, Captain Ingersoll was responsible for detailed supervision of convoy escort operations. Through superior knowledge and seamanship, he contributed materially to the steady decline in shipping losses.

On 10 April 1944 Ingersoll became the commanding officer of the light aircraft carrier USS Monterey (CVL-26), which operated in the Pacific Ocean in the United States Third and Fifth Fleets. He commanded Monterey during the Battle of the Philippine Sea in June 1944 the Battle of Guam in July–August 1944, air strikes by the Fast Carrier Task Force against Formosa in mid-October 1944, and the Leyte campaign and Battle of Leyte Gulf later in October 1944. He received the Navy Cross for his actions during the Formosa raids and the Battle of Leyte Gulf, the citation reading in part:

...for extraordinary heroism and distinguished service in the line of his profession as Commanding Officer of the Light Aircraft Carrier U.S.S. MONTEREY (CVL-26), in the face of tremendous enemy opposition during action against enemy Japanese forces off Formosa during the period 29 August 1944 through 30 October 1944. When the MONTEREY came under heavy Japanese aerial attack while boldly penetrating the hazardous waters off Formosa on 13–14 October [1944], Captain Ingersoll fearlessly held his courage and, hurling the full fighting strength of his planes, despite terrific odds succeeded in blasting a number of hostile aircraft from the sky with no damage to his own vessel. During the Battle for Leyte Gulf on 25–26 October 1944, he inflicted heavy damage and destruction upon capital ships of the Japanese fleet in a bitterly fought, decisive engagement. Captain Ingersoll's inspiring leadership and the valiant devotion to duty of his command contributed in large measure to the outstanding success of these vital missions.

During the extremely dangerous Typhoon Cobra of December 1944, aircraft on Monterey's hangar deck broke loose and wrought destruction as they slid across the deck while the ship rolled heavily, igniting a fire. Urged to abandon ship by United States Third Fleet commander Admiral William F. Halsey Jr., Ingersoll exhibited determination to save Monterey in ignoring the order as he directed his crew – which included future U.S. U.S. President Gerald R. Ford – to extinguish the fire and displayed excellent seamanship in saving the ship. Ingersoll relinquished command of Monterey on 28 January 1945. In March 1945, he took up duties as Commandant of Midshipmen at the U.S. Naval Academy.

=== Post-World War II ===
After World War II, Ingersoll remained commandant of midshipmen until 1947. Future U.S. President Jimmy Carter, class of 1946, was a midshipman at the academy during his tenure. On 2 November 1945, the United States Senate confirmed his promotion to the temporary rank of rear admiral, with a date of rank backdated to 9 March 1944. In 1947 he became commander, Fleet Air Wing 2, and in December 1947 he became chief of staff and aide to the Commander-in-Chief, U.S. Pacific Fleet.

By January 1950, Ingersoll was Director of Strategic Plans in the office of the Deputy Chief of Naval Operations for Operations. He remained in that position as of May 1951, but by May 1952 he was the Assistant Chief of Naval Operations for Operations.

Ingersoll returned to sea as the commander, Carrier Division Four, then in June 1953 became chief of staff and aide to the Commander-in-Chief, United States Atlantic Fleet. Promoted to vice admiral on 7 September 1955, he was commander of the United States Seventh Fleet from 19 December 1955 to 28 January 1957, also serving as commander, United States Taiwan Defense Command, from December 1955 to July 1957. Ingersoll received the Distinguished Service Medal for his Seventh Fleet and Taiwan Defense Command tour, the citation reading in part:

...as Commander SEVENTH Fleet and Commander United States-Taiwan Defense Command from December 1955 to June 1957...Under his leadership the SEVENTH Fleet was maintained at a high state of combat readiness as a stabilizing element in the Far East. As Commander United States-Taiwan Defense Command, Vice Admiral Ingersoll was directly responsible for carrying out United States policy in cooperation with the Chinese nationalist government in the defense of Taiwan.

Ingersoll became the 31st President of the Naval War College in Newport, Rhode Island, on 13 August 1957, bringing a broad background in post-World War II planning and leadership in unified commands to the college. During his presidency, he oversaw the changeover of the college's wargaming from manual to computerized processes, and on 13 November 1958, the Naval Electronic Warfare Simulator (NEWS) was commissioned in Sims Hall. He also served on the Civil War Centennial Commission while at the college, beginning in the autumn of 1957. His presidency concluded on 30 June 1960. He received a gold star in lieu of a second award of the Distinguished Service Medal for his tour at the college, the citation reading in part:

...while serving as President, United States Naval War College, from August 1957 to July 1960. Under his astute direction, the Naval War College has maintained a special and proper emphasis upon naval power within the concepts of national strategy and has recognized and incorporated into the various curricula the implications of the rapid technological advances and Cold War requirements.

== Personal life ==
Ingersoll's first marriage was to the former Josephine Springman (d. 1964), with whom he had a son, Stuart H. "Mike" Ingersoll II, and two daughters, Mary Josephine and Sally Ann. He later married Elinore Dorrance Hill (d. 1977).

== Death ==
Ingersoll died on 29 January 1983 at the Naval Regional Medical Center in Newport, Rhode Island.

== Decorations ==
=== Navy Cross citation ===
His official Navy Cross citation reads:

General Orders: Bureau of Naval Personnel Information Bulletin No. 345 (December 1945)
Action Date: August 29 - October 30, 1944
Name: Stuart Howe Ingersoll
Service: Navy
Rank: Captain
Company: Commanding Officer
Division: U.S.S. Monterey (CVL-26)
Citation: The President of the United States of America takes pleasure in presenting the Navy Cross to Captain Stuart Howe Ingersoll, United States Navy, for extraordinary heroism and distinguished service in the line of his profession as Commanding Officer of the Light Aircraft Carrier U.S.S. MONTEREY (CVL-26), in the face of tremendous enemy opposition during action against enemy Japanese forces off Formosa during the period 29 August 1944 through 30 October 1944. When the MONTEREY came under heavy Japanese aerial attack while bolding penetrating the hazardous waters off Formosa on 13–14 October, Captain Ingersoll fearlessly held his courage and, hurling the full fighting strength of his planes, despite terrific odds succeeded in blasting a number of hostile aircraft from the sky with no damage to his own vessel. During the Battle for Leyte Gulf on 25–26 October 1944, he inflicted heavy damage and destruction upon capital ships of the Japanese fleet in a bitterly fought, decisive engagement. Captain Ingersoll's inspiring leadership and the valiant devotion to duty of his command contributed in large measure to the outstanding success of these vital missions and reflect great credit upon the United States Naval Service.

=== Ribbon bar ===
Here is vice admiral Stuart H. Ingersoll's ribbon bar:

Naval Aviator Badge
1st Row	Navy Cross		
2nd Row	Navy Distinguished Service Medal w/ gold star	Legion of Merit w/ gold star and "V" Device	Navy Commendation Medal w/ gold star
3rd Row	World War I Victory Medal w/ Escort Clasp	American Defense Service Medal w/ Atlantic Clasp	American Campaign Medal
4th Row	European-African-Middle Eastern Campaign Medal w/ one service star	Asiatic-Pacific Campaign Medal w/ two bronze service stars	World War II Victory Medal
5th Row	National Defense Service Medal	Philippine Liberation Medal w/ two stars	Order of the British Empire

== Notes ==
Military offices
Preceded by Thomas H. Robbins Jr.	President of the Naval War College; 13 August 1957–30 June 1960	Succeeded by Bernard L. Austin
