= Ronald A. Route =

United States admiral (born 1949)

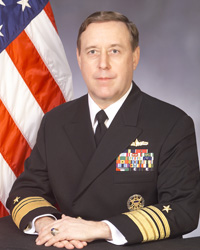
- Born: October 24, 1949 (age 76); Denver, Colorado, U.S.
- Military career
- Allegiance: United States of America
- Branch: United States Navy
- Service years: 1971–2008
- Rank: Vice Admiral
- Commands: USS Dewey (DDG-45); USS Lake Erie (CG-70); Cruiser-Destroyer Group Two; USS George Washington (CVN-73) Carrier Battle Group; Navy Warfare Development Command; President of the Naval War College; Naval Inspector General
- Conflicts: Cold War; Operation Desert Storm; Operation Enduring Freedom
- Awards: Distinguished Service Medal; Legion of Merit (six awards) with one Silver Star; Defense Meritorious Service Medal; Meritorious Service Medal (four awards); Navy Commendation Medal (three awards) with two Gold Stars; Navy Achievement Medal (two awards) with Gold Star

Ronald A. Route (born October 24, 1949) is a retired Vice Admiral and former Naval Inspector General of the United States Navy and a former President of the Naval War College. On July 16, 2013, Vice Admiral Route was named President of the Naval Postgraduate School.

== Naval career ==
A native of Denver, Colorado, Route graduated from the United States Naval Academy in 1971, and subsequently completed a series of command and leadership assignments both within the Navy and in the Joint Service arena. He commanded the guided-missile destroyer USS Dewey (DDG-45), the guided-missile cruiser USS Lake Erie (CG-70), Cruiser-Destroyer Group Two, and the USS George Washington (CVN-73) Carrier Battle Group. In addition to his afloat commands, he served at sea with Cruiser-Destroyer Group Two and Destroyer Squadron Four, and aboard the guided-missile cruiser USS Halsey (CG-23), the frigate USS Roark (FF-1053), the guided-missile cruiser USS Wainwright (CG-28), and the destroyer USS Barry (DD-933).

Ashore, Route commanded the Navy Warfare Development Command (NWDC). From 9 July 2003 to 12 August 2004, he was the 50th officer to serve as President of the Naval War College since the college's founding in 1884. During his tour as president, he sharpened the college's focus on mission and relevance; initiated research, analysis, and wargaming to address key operational concerns of the U.S. Navy such as ballistic missile defense and antisubmarine warfare and established the Halsey Scholars, an advanced research program for selected students; and facilitated discussions between retired Soviet Navy officers and their American counterparts on Cold War naval history. Route assumed his duties as Naval Inspector General in August 2004 after leaving the presidency of the Naval War College. His other flag assignments included two tours on the Chief of Naval Operations staff, first as Director, Politico-Military Affairs Division (N52) and later as Director, Navy Programming Division (N80), where he developed and prioritized a multi-year spending plan for the Navy's $80–$100 billion annual budget.

Route's Pentagon assignments also included Executive Assistant to the Assistant Secretary of the Navy (Manpower and Reserve Affairs) for three assistant secretaries in two presidential administrations, Long-Range Planner and Surface Ship Readiness analyst in the Chief of Naval Operations's Program Resource Appraisal Division (now N81), and Naval Warfare Analyst in the Joint Analysis Directorate (now part of J8), within the Organization of the Joint Chiefs of Staff.

Route retired from the Navy in January 2008 after more than 36 years on active duty. In October 2013, Route became the second civilian president of the Naval Postgraduate School. He presided over the university as it rose from restrictions resulting from a Naval Inspector General's report. Route's accomplishments in moving NPS forward are highly significant. He retired from NPS in January 2019 having made NPS a much stronger university educating military officers, first responders, and Pentagon civilians with masters and doctoral degrees.

== Education ==
Route holds a Bachelor of Science degree in Systems Engineering from the U.S. Naval Academy and a Master of Science degree in Operations Research from the Naval Postgraduate School. Selected for a Navy Federal Executive Fellowship in 1996, he completed a year-long assignment as a military fellow at the Council on Foreign Relations in New York City and subsequently was invited to become a Council member in June 1998.

== Awards and decorations ==
Route's personal decorations include the Distinguished Service Medal, the Legion of Merit (six awards), the Defense Meritorious Service Medal, the Meritorious Service Medal (four awards), the Navy Commendation Medal (three awards), and the Navy Achievement Medal (two awards).

- Navy Distinguished Service Medal
- Legion of Merit with one Silver Star
- Defense Meritorious Service Medal
- Meritorious Service Medal
- Navy and Marine Corps Commendation Medal with two Gold Stars
- Navy and Marine Corps Achievement Medal with Gold Star

== See also ==
Military offices
Preceded by Rodney P. Rempt	President of the Naval War College; July 9, 2003–August 12, 2004	Succeeded by Jacob L. Shuford
Preceded by Albert T. Church	Naval Inspector General; August 2004–November 2007	Succeeded by Anthony L. Winns
