= French Ensor Chadwick =

American naval officer (1844–1919)

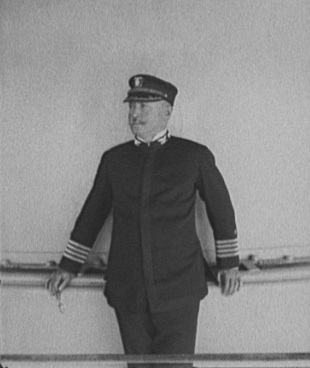
- Born: February 29, 1844; Morgantown, Virginia (now West Virginia)
- Died: January 27, 1919 (aged 74)
- Military career
- Allegiance: United States of America
- Branch: United States Navy
- Rank: Rear admiral
- Commands: Office of Naval Intelligence
- Battles/incidents: American Civil War; Spanish–American War: Battle of Santiago de Cuba
- Awards: Sampson Medal; Civil War Campaign Medal; West Indies Campaign Medal

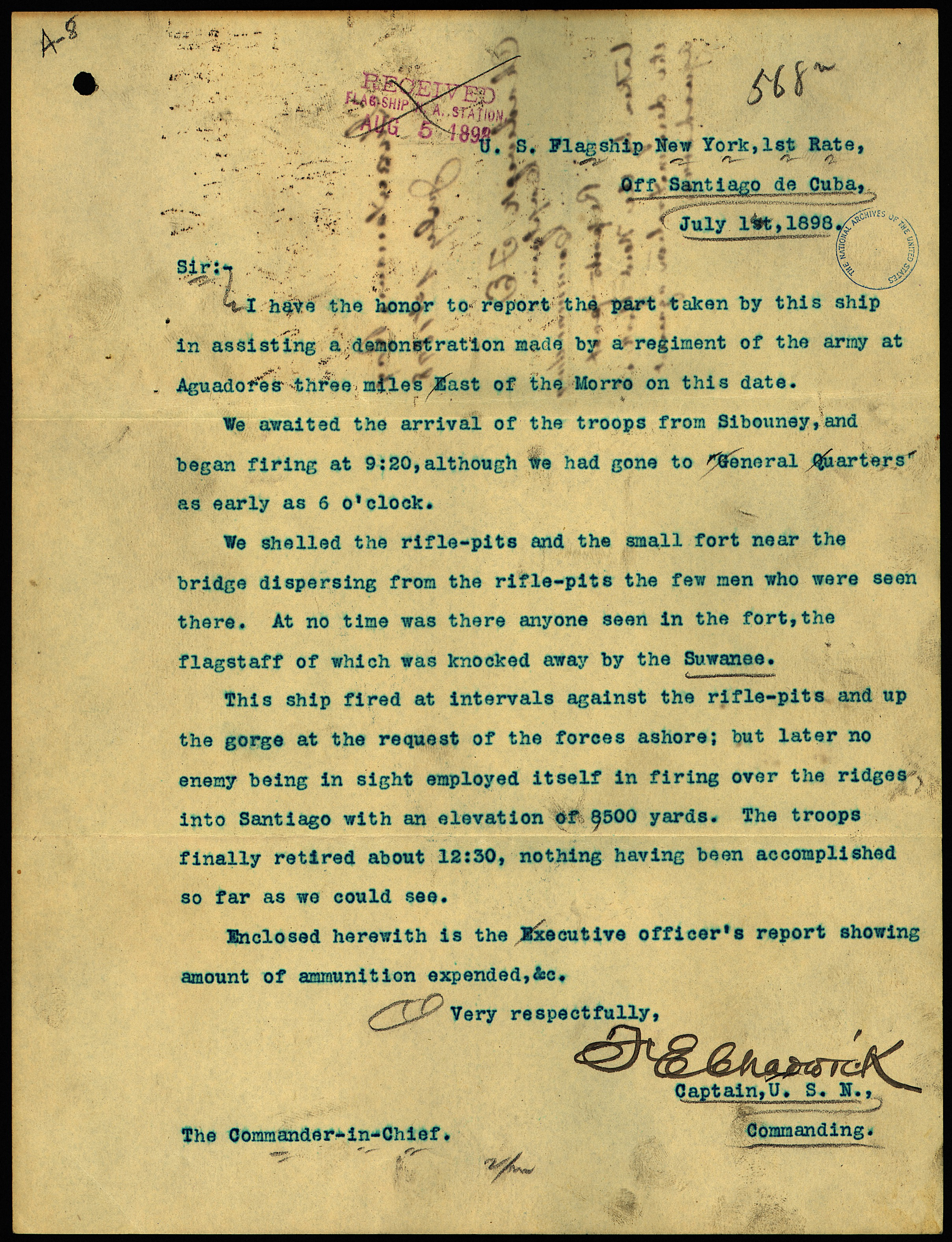
An 1898 battle report from Captain Chadwick, regarding naval operations in support of the Battle of Santiago

Rear Admiral French Ensor Chadwick USN (February 29, 1844 – January 27, 1919) was a United States Navy officer who became prominent in the naval reform movement of the post-Civil War era. He was particularly noted for his contributions to naval education, and served as President of the Naval War College from 1900 to 1903.

A native of Morgantown, West Virginia, he attended the United States Naval Academy from 1861 to 1864, then temporarily relocated from Annapolis, Maryland, to Newport, Rhode Island during the Civil War due to concerns about Maryland's secessionist sympathy as a border state. Graduating fourth in his class, his first sea assignment was to the gunboat USS Marblehead.

From 1865 to 1870, he served successively in four warships in the South Atlantic and Caribbean: the sidewheel steam frigate USS Susquehanna in which he was promoted to Ensign in 1866, the sloop of war USS Juniata, the frigate Sabine in which he was promoted to Lieutenant in 1868, and the screw sloop USS Tuscarora in which he was promoted to Lieutenant Commander a year later. Following a brief assignment to the newly established Naval Torpedo Station in Newport, Rhode Island, during 1870, Chadwick served in the screw sloop of war USS Guerriere with the European Squadron until 1872. At that point, he was assigned to the U.S. Naval Academy as an instructor in mathematics. On leaving the academy in 1875, he reported to the sidewheel steam frigate USS Powhatan as the ship's executive officer. On his detachment from that ship, he took a leave of absence from the Navy. During this period, he married Cornelia Jones Miller, the daughter of a U.S. Consular official in 1878 and carried out a study on how sailors were trained in Britain, France, and Germany. This document proved useful to Captain Stephen B. Luce in developing a training squadron and station at Newport, Rhode Island. In 1881, Lt Commander Chadwick led the investigation into the fog signals at Little Gull Island Light in Long Island Sound after the Galatea ran around in the fog during the evening of May 12, 1881.

Major sea commands included the gunboat USS Yorktown, commissioned in 1889. He served in the Spanish–American War, fighting at the Battle of Santiago de Cuba.

As commander of the South Atlantic Squadron he played a major part in the Perdicaris incident of 1904 in Morocco.

He was also a noted historian who wrote several published books, including a noted work on The Causes of the Civil War.

In a 1917 speech, he complained that American women were not having enough children compared to immigrants, and that "soon the older American stock will be replaced completely." He also charged that boys were being made effeminate due to exposure of female public-school teachers.

== Portrayal ==
Chadwick was portrayed by Roy Jenson in the 1975 film The Wind and the Lion.

== Awards ==
- Civil War Campaign Medal
- Sampson Medal
- West Indies Campaign Medal
- Spanish Campaign Medal

Preceded by Charles Henry Davis	Head of the Office of Naval Intelligence (Chief Intelligence Officer); September 1892 – June 1893	Succeeded by Frederick Singer
Preceded by Charles Herbert Stockton	President of the Naval War College; 1900–1903	Succeeded by Charles S. Sperry
