= John A. Baldwin Jr. =

American admiral

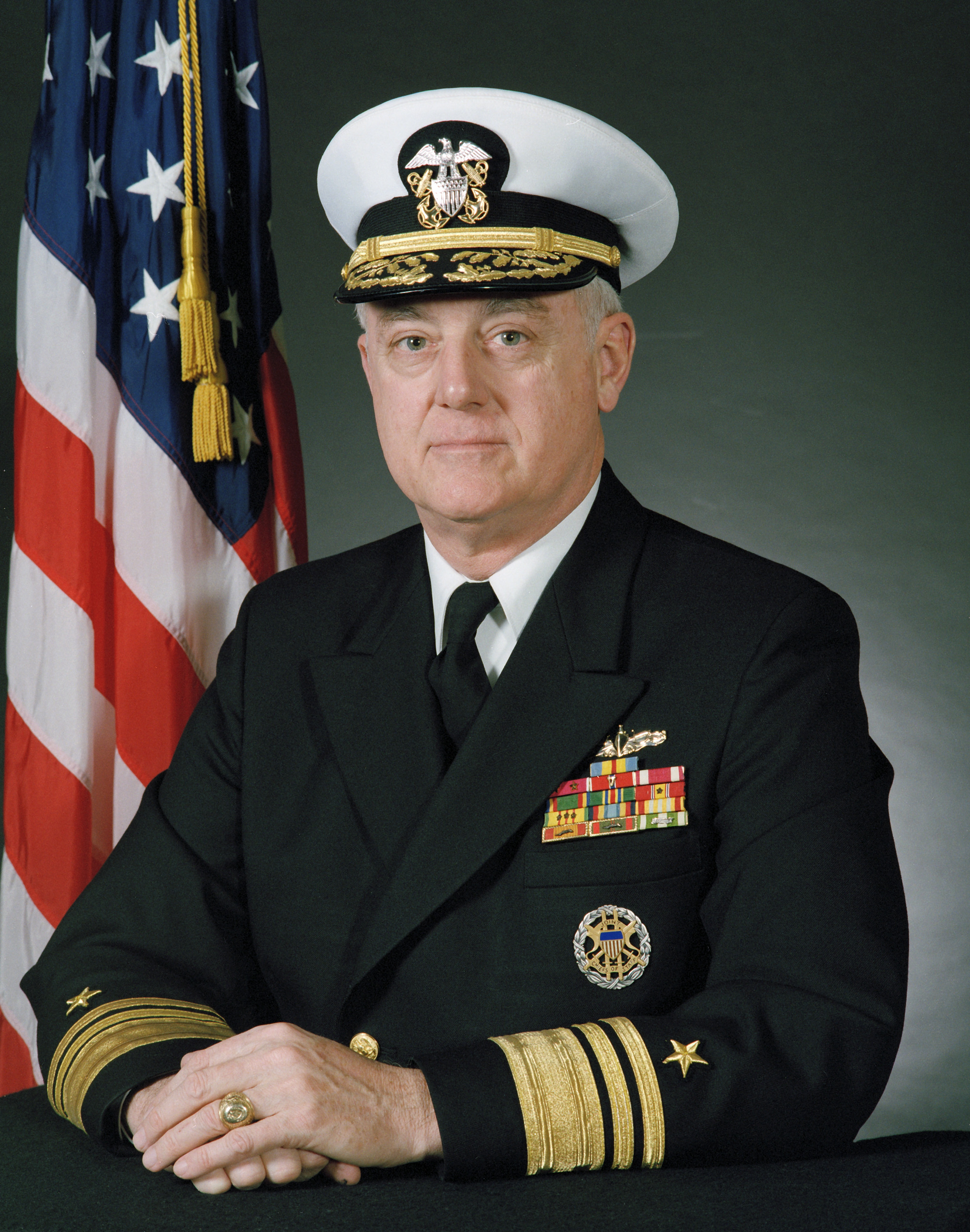
- Born: April 20, 1933 (age 93); Baltimore, Maryland, U.S.
- Military career
- Allegiance: United States of America
- Branch: United States Navy
- Service years: 1955-1992
- Rank: Vice Admiral
- Commands: USS Marysville (EPCER-857); USS John R. Perry (DE-1034); USS Meyerkord (DE-1058); Destroyer Division 33; Cruiser-Destroyer Group 3; USS Kitty Hawk (CV-63) Battle Group; President of the Naval War College; President of the National Defense University
- Conflicts: Vietnam War; Cold War

John Ashby Baldwin Jr. (born April 20, 1933) is a retired vice admiral of the United States Navy active during much of the Cold War. He commanded destroyers and a carrier battle group, saw service in the Vietnam War, served on the staffs of the Chief of Naval Operations, the Joint Chiefs of Staff, the Secretary of the Navy, and the Secretary of Defense, and was President of the Naval War College and of the National Defense University.

== Naval career ==
Baldwin was born in Baltimore, Maryland, and graduated from Kent School in 1950 and the United States Naval Academy in 1955. After being commissioned as an ensign, he had duty on the destroyers USS Dennis J. Buckley (DD-808) and USS Gainard (DD-706), at the Naval Small Craft Facility at Annapolis, Maryland, and at the Coronado Naval Amphibious School in Coronado, California. From 1962 to 1964, he was assigned to the Naval Reserve Officer Training Corps unit at the University of Washington, and while there did postgraduate studies in oceanography before being transferred to the Naval Oceanographic Office in March 1964.

Over the following seven years Baldwin served as executive officer of the destroyer USS Johnston (DD-821) and as commanding officer USS Marysville (EPCER-857), the destroyer escorts USS John R. Perry (DE-1034) and USS Meyerkord (DE-1058) and had a two-year tour in the Office of the Oceanographer of the Navy.

After a brief assignment to Mare Island Inshore Operations Training Center in California in 1971, Baldwin became Senior Advisor, Military Region II, with U.S. Naval Forces Vietnam during the Vietnam War. In January 1973, he joined the Office of the Chief of Naval Operations (CNO) in Washington, D.C., as Head, Surface Warfare Analysis, and Head, Sea Control Branch. In 1975, after more than two years with the Office of the CNO, he became Commander, Destroyer Division 33, remaining there until August 1977.

Following his tour with Destroyer Division 33, Baldwin returned to Washington, D.C., serving in the Office of the Secretary of the Navy. He subsequently joined the staff of the Secretary of Defense as Military Assistant to the Deputy Secretary of Defense. Following this, he served from 1981 to 1982 as Director of the Systems Analysis Division in the Office of the CNO.

From 1982 to 1986, Baldwin served in the Pacific. His first assignment was as Commander Cruiser-Destroyer Group 3 and commander of the USS Kitty Hawk (CV-63) Carrier Battle Group during a deployment to the western Pacific and Indian Ocean. In October 1984, he reported to the Commander in Chief, United States Pacific Fleet, as Deputy Chief of Staff for Operations and Plans.

From 2 September 1986 to 11 August 1987, Baldwin served as the 44th President of the Naval War College in Newport, Rhode Island, overseeing senior education and wargaming for the Navy. During his presidency, he initiated the process for accreditation of the college to grant master's degrees (which it would receive in 1991), established the Institute for Strategic Studies to facilitate accreditation and retain talented faculty, and restored the college library after a fire inflicted serious damage on it.

Baldwin next served as Director of the Strategic Plans and Policy Division (J-5) on the Joint Staff, responsible to the Chairman of the Joint Chiefs of Staff for the strategic direction of the United States Armed Forces.

Baldwin's last assignment was as President of the National Defense University, where for three years he was responsible for senior education for the Departments of Defense and State. The University, comprising four colleges, including the National War College and the Industrial College of the Armed Forces, and two specialized institutes, including the Institute for National Strategic Studies, increased its faculty by over 25 percent while reducing staff by 15 percent during his tenure. Additionally, he gained approval from the Department of Defense and Department of Education to seek accreditation for the university to award master's degrees.

Baldwin retired from active duty on 1 October 1992 after 37 years as a naval officer.

== Attribution ==
This article includes public domain text from the Naval History and Heritage Command Web site's page Papers of Vice Admiral John A. Baldwin, Jr., USN, 1975-1989

Military offices
Preceded by Ronald F. Marryott	President of the Naval War College; 2 September 1986–11 August 1987	Succeeded by Ronald J. Kurth
