= General Board of the United States Navy =

Former advisory body of the US Navy

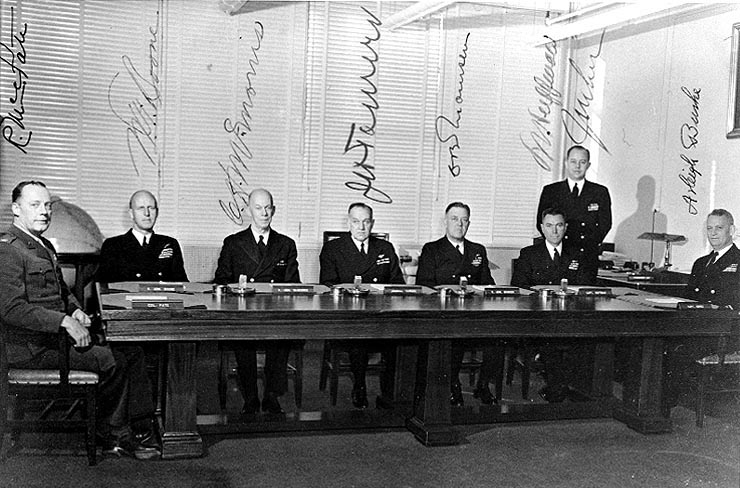
The General Board of the U.S. Navy in November, 1947. From left to right: Colonel Randolph M. Pate; Admiral Walter F. Boone; Admiral Charles H. McMorris; Admiral John H. Towers; Rear Admiral Charles B. Momsen; Captain Leon J. Huffman; Commander J. M. Lee; Captain Arleigh A. Burke

The General Board of the United States Navy was an advisory body of the United States Navy, somewhat akin to a naval general staff. The General Board was established by general order 544, issued on March 13, 1900 by Secretary of the Navy John Davis Long. The order was officially recognized by Congress in 1916. The General Board was disbanded in 1951.

== Origins ==
"The war with Spain had underlined the need for adequate staff work and the success of the War Board had pointed the way for the future. Among the most persistent advocates of a general staff for the Navy was Captain Henry C. Taylor. He had first laid plans for such a staff before Roosevelt in May 1897; now in 1900 he brought the idea once more to the attention of Secretary Long. Long, however, was reluctant to risk a fight with his entrenched bureau chiefs, hesitant about allowing the professional officers wide powers outside civilian control, and rightly dubious whether Congress could be brought to approve the scheme. Consequently he compromised, and in March 1900 created a Board, known as the General Board, which possessed no executive functions, but was to serve as a purely advisory council which was constitutionally confined to considering such problems of strategy as the secretary of the Navy might refer to it."

== Purpose and composition ==
The General Board was composed of senior admirals, most near the end of their careers, who could be relied upon to "deliberate selflessly and objectively on matters ranging from strategy to ship characteristics". "These senior officers, some in the twilight of their careers, without line responsibilities, and other members on an ex officio basis, not only brought considerable expertise to bear, they also had the time to devote to problem solving without the press of day-to-day decision making."

"The board had two categories of members – the full time executive committee and ex officio members, senior officers holding specifics posts, who attended monthly board meetings. ... the ex officio members of the board included the president of the Naval War College, the director of naval intelligence, and the chief of the Bureau of Navigation. The general board was a watered-down version of the naval general staff proposed by a line officer, Captain Henry C. Taylor, in February 1900."

"Originally consisting of nine officers, the membership of the board was changed frequently – in 1902 to 10; in 1904 to 14; in 1905 to seven; and in 1909 back to nine."

The board was headed by a chairman (also known as its president). George Dewey chaired the board from its inception until 1917, although a stroke in 1914 limited his abilities in the last three years of his tenure.

"The role that the General Board of the Navy played was the critical organizational dynamic in linking the treaty system and innovation in the fleet. Particularly astonishing, given the hierarchical nature of the U.S. Navy, was the General Board's tolerant and consensus-driven process which led to an environment highly favorable to creativity and innovation."

== Dissolution ==
In its beginning years, the General Board of the United States Navy was effectively a naval general staff, but started to lose its influence with the creation of the Chief of Naval Operations (OpNav). "The creation of the office of Chief of Naval Operations in 1915 reduced some of the importance of the board, but even until the beginning of World War II some of the most senior admirals on the active list and some very experienced retired admirals were assigned to the General Board. ... During the latter years of its life – particularly since World War II, the establishment of the Joint Chiefs of Staff, and the Unification Act – the General Board was put to less and less use." In 1945 the board's role as the coordinator between Navy materiel bureaus of 'ship characteristics' was transferred to the Ship Characteristics Board / SCB within OpNav, leaving the board with long range policy and strategy functions only; this change was made due to the board having been seen as ineffective in a series of earlier Navy bureau miscoordinations. The board was inactivated by order of Chief of Naval Operations Forrest Sherman in April 1951 and abolished the following month.
