= John N. Christenson =

American naval admiral

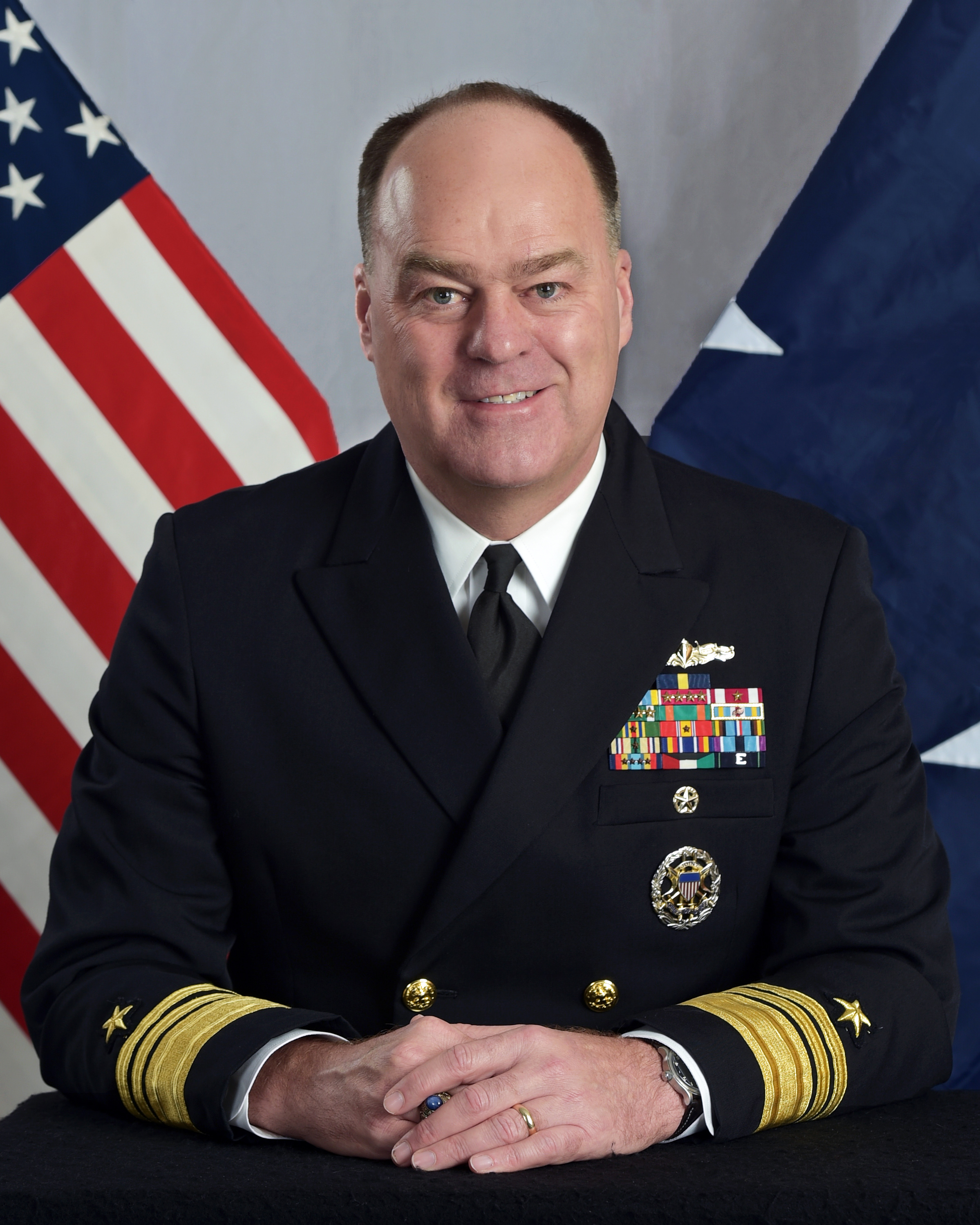
- Christenson in 2017
- Born: 1958 (age 67–68); Carmel, California, U.S.
- Military career
- Allegiance: United States of America
- Branch: United States Navy
- Service years: 1981–2018
- Rank: Vice admiral
- Commands: USS McClusky (FFG-41); Destroyer Squadron 21; Carrier Strike Group 12; President of the Board of Inspection and Survey; Surface Warfare Officers School; Naval Mine and Antisubmarine Warfare Command; President of the Naval War College
- Awards: Navy Distinguished Service Medal; Defense Superior Service Medal (two awards); Legion of Merit (five awards); Meritorious Service Medal (two awards); Navy and Marine Corps Commendation Medal (five awards); Navy and Marine Corps Achievement Medal

John Nels Christenson (born 1958) is a retired vice admiral in the United States Navy who last served as the United States Military Representative to the NATO Military Committee, in Brussels, Belgium. He was the 53rd President of the Naval War College in Newport, Rhode Island from March 2011 to July 2013.

== Early years ==
The fourth of six sons of a U.S. Navy Douglas A-1 Skyraider pilot and a Navy nurse, Christenson graduated from the United States Naval Academy in 1981. He graduated with distinction and first in his class from the Naval War College in March 1993, earning his master's degree in national security and strategic studies. He was also a Navy Federal Executive Fellow at the Fletcher School of Law and Diplomacy at Tufts University.

== Naval career ==
At sea, Christenson commanded the guided-missile frigate USS McClusky (FFG-41); Destroyer Squadron 21 aboard the aircraft carrier USS John C. Stennis (CVN-74); and Carrier Strike Group 12 in the USS Enterprise (CVN 65) Carrier Strike Group. He also served as the antisubmarine warfare officer and main propulsion assistant aboard the frigate USS Cook (FF-1083); aide to the Commander of Cruiser-Destroyer Group 1 aboard the guided-missile cruiser USS Long Beach (CGN-9); weapons officer aboard the frigate USS Downes (FF-1070); Destroyer Squadron 21 combat systems officer aboard the aircraft carrier USS Nimitz (CVN-68); and as executive officer aboard the destroyer USS Harry W. Hill (DD-986). He deployed eight times on seven ships and twice in command of McClusky.

Ashore, he commanded the Surface Warfare Officers School in Newport, and as a new flag officer he served as Commander, Naval Mine and Antisubmarine Warfare Command at Corpus Christi, Texas. He also served at the U.S. Naval Academy as a company officer, celestial navigation instructor, assistant varsity soccer coach, and member of the admissions board; at Headquarters, United States Marine Corps in the Strategic Initiatives Group; on the Joint Staff, J5, and as executive assistant to the assistant chairman.

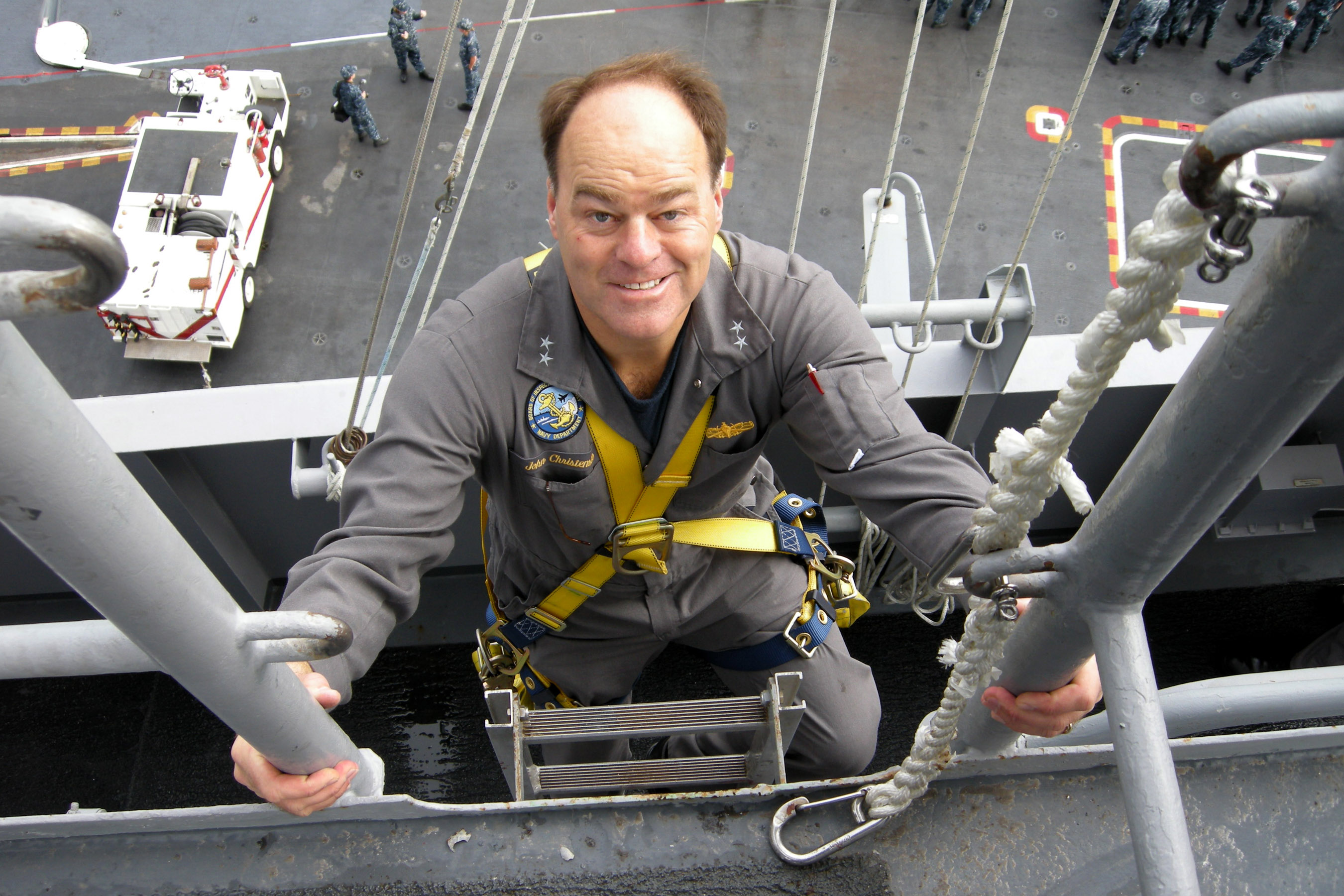
Christenson climbs a ladder in October 2010 to inspect the mast of the aircraft carrier USS Carl Vinson (CVN-70).

Christenson served as president of the Board of Inspection and Survey from 2009 to 2011. He became the 53rd president of the Naval War College on 30 March 2011 and served in that position until 2 July 2013, when he was appointed deputy United States military representative to the NATO Military Committee, in Brussels, Belgium. After six months in Brussels, he became chief of staff, U.S. European Command in Stuttgart, Germany.

== Decorations and medals ==
Christenson has been awarded the following:

- Navy Distinguished Service Medal
- Defense Superior Service Medal (two awards)
- Legion of Merit (five awards)
- Meritorious Service Medal (two awards)
- Navy and Marine Corps Commendation Medal (five awards)
- Navy and Marine Corps Achievement Medal

Military offices
Preceded by James P. "Phil" Wisecup	President of the Naval War College; March 30, 2011–July 2, 2013	Succeeded by Walter E. Carter Jr.
