= Ronald J. Kurth =

United States Navy admiral (1931–2020)

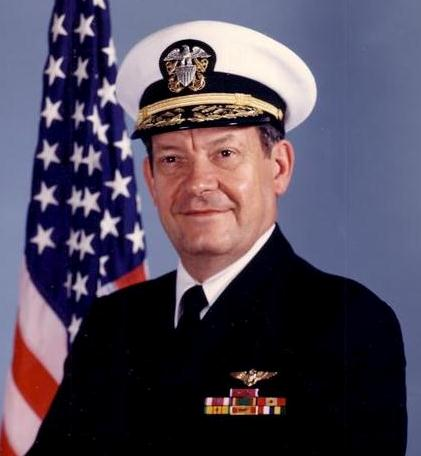
- Born: July 1, 1931; Madison, Wisconsin, U.S.
- Died: April 10, 2020 (aged 88); Jacksonville, Florida, U.S.
- Military career
- Allegiance: United States of America
- Branch: United States Navy
- Service years: 1954–1990
- Rank: Rear Admiral
- Commands: President of the Naval War College
- Conflicts: Cold War; Vietnam War
- Other work: President, Murray State University; Dean of Academic Affairs, Air War College; President St. John's Northwestern Military Academy; Faculty, University of North Florida

Ronald James Kurth (July 1, 1931 – April 10, 2020) was a rear admiral of the United States Navy. His career included service in the Cold War and Vietnam War. A naval aviator and Russian area studies scholar fluent in the Russian language, he served on diplomatic posts in Moscow and on the staff of the Chief of Naval Operations and was President of the Naval War College.

== Naval career ==
Kurth was born in Madison, Wisconsin and graduated from the United States Naval Academy in 1954 with a Bachelor of Science degree in Engineering. He qualified as a naval aviator and later flew missions over Vietnam during the Vietnam War.

A Russian area studies scholar, Kurth earned his master's degree in public administration and his doctorate in political science of the Soviet Union and Russia at Harvard University – where he was a teaching fellow in American National Government – and taught the Russian language as an instructor at the U.S. Naval Academy. He served as U.S. naval attaché in Moscow from 1975 to 1977, followed by one year as Military Fellow at the Council of Foreign Relations from 1977 to 1978. He served in the Office of the Chief of Naval Operations from 1981 to 1983 as Director, Politico-Military Policy and Current Plans Division, and from 1983 to 1984 as Director of Long Range Planning. He returned to Moscow as U.S. defense attaché from 1985 to 1987.

On 11 August 1987, Kurth became the 45th President of the Naval War College in Newport, Rhode Island, overseeing senior education and wargaming for the Navy. During his presidency, he testified before the United States Congress about the effect on military education of the Goldwater-Nichols Act, conceived the idea that would lead to the accreditation of the college to grant master's degrees, and began a long-term effort to construct a new building for the college.

Kurth retired from the Navy at the conclusion of his Naval War College presidency on 17 July 1990 after 36 years of service.

== Retirement ==
In retirement, Kurth remained active in academia. He was president of Murray State University in Murray, Kentucky, from 1990 to 1994, Dean of Academic Affairs at the Air War College in Montgomery, Alabama, from 1994 to 1998, and president of St. John's Northwestern Military Academy in Delafield, Wisconsin, from July 1998 to 2005. He later also taught at the University of North Florida in Jacksonville, Florida. Kurth died in Jacksonville on April 10, 2020.

Military offices
Preceded by John A. Baldwin, Jr.	President of the Naval War College; 11 August 1987–17 July 1990	Succeeded by Joseph C. Strasser
