= Presidential Commission on the Assignment of Women in the Armed Forces =

Jurisdiction
- Purpose: "[A]ssess the laws and policies restricting the assignment of female service members and ... make findings on such matters"
- Policy areas: United States Armed Forces, gender inequality

The role of women in the United States armed services became an important political topic in 1991. Women military personnel had engaged in combat in the most recent U.S. military actions: Grenada in 1983 Panama in 1989, and the Gulf War in 1991. Senator William V. Roth (R-DE) introduced a Senate bill in 1991 to clarify women's roles in the armed forces, including combat.

Representative Patricia Schroeder (D-CO1) and Beverly B. Byron (D-MD6) then convinced the House Armed Services Committee to amend the House bill under consideration for military appropriations for 1992 and 1993 to allow combat roles for military women. In the Senate Armed Services Committee, Senator John Glenn (D-OH) opined that a thorough review and study of the issue of women's role in the armed services would take up to 18 months.

Senator Sam Nunn (D-GA), Chair of the Senate Committee, then introduced several Senate bills—102 S. 1507, 102 S. 1508, 102 S. 1509, and 102 S. 1515—to create just such a commission. The Congressional conference committee chosen to reconcile the House and Senate versions of bills for 1992-1993 military appropriations (of which Sen. Nunn was a member) included creating the Commission in the approved 1992-1993 military appropriations law.

== Official name ==
"Presidential Commission on the Assignment of Women in the Armed Forces"

== Enabling authority ==
- Public Law 102-190, National Defense Authorization Act for FY 1992 -1993 (December 5, 1991). Sections 541 through 549.

== Purposes ==
- "In general, the Commission shall assess the laws and policies restricting the assignment of female service members and shall make findings on such matters"

Specific matters for the Commission to study included

- Combat readiness of armed forces permitting women combat roles

Their physical fitness
The effect of pregnancy and other absences
Unit morale and cohesion

- Public attitudes regarding military women assigned combat roles
- Legal implications of

Draft and conscription of women
Voluntary assignments for women in combat roles
Involuntary assignments for women in combat roles

- Modification of facilities, quarters, vehicles, and equipment for women in combat roles
- Training of women in the combat skills to use these combat materials
- Costs involved in these modifications and training for women for combat roles
- Implications of allowing or restricting women from combat roles on the recruitment

and retention of armed forces personnel

== Membership ==
The President appoints the 15 commission members from among those in the public or private sector the President feels have both distinguished themselves in their own field of endeavor and have "significant experience" in one or more of the commission's areas of concern.

--Retired military personnel
--Academic institutions
--Civilian industry
--Non-defense related government agencies
--The law
--Armed forces combat
--Armed forces combat support
--Armed forces personnel management

Three of the commissioners must be women representing specific groups

Armed Services member
Representative from a women-in-the-armed-services organization
Representative from a women's issues organization

Commissioners

- Robert T. Herres, General, United States Air Force (Ret.) Chairman
- Mary E. Clarke, Major General, United States Army (Ret.)
- Samuel E. Cockerham, Brigadier General, US Army
- Elaine Donnelly,
- Thomas V. Draude, Brigadier General, United States Marine Corps
- Mary M. Finch, Captain, US Army
- William Darryl Henderson, PhD
- James R. Hogg, Admiral, United States Navy (Ret.)
- Newton N. Minow
- Charles C. Moskos, PhD
- Meredith A. Neizer,
- Kate Walsh O'Beirne
- Ronald D. Ray
- Maxwell R. Thurman, General, US Army (Ret.)
- Sarah F. White, Master Sergeant, US Air Force Reserve

== Information gathering by panels ==
Each member of the commission, except for the Chair, was assigned to a panel to collect specific information relating to the commission's purposes.

- Panel One

Commissions members: Ray (Chair), Clarke, Henderson
Assignment: Women's roles in the armed services of other nations; women's roles in domestic law enforcement; the issue of prisoner of war

- Panel Two

Commission members: Cockerham (Chair), Finch, Moskos
Assignment: Physiological and cost issues for training, readiness, clothing, facilities, and equipment; the issue of pregnancy; the issue of combat unit cohesion

- Panel Three

Commission members: Neizer (Chair), Donnelly, Thurman
Assignment: Social and cultural issues, with a focus on the family; concerns about parenthood and child care affecting "deployability"; analysis of the surveys done for the Commission

- Panel Four

Commission members: O'Beirne (Chair), Draude, Hogg, White
Assignment: Legal and management issues; issues surrounding personnel retention and career development in all-volunteer armed services; examine recent : experiences of women in combat in Panama and Grenada

== Survey research ==
- Roper Polls

The commission had this prestigious center conduct two surveys on the roles of women in the U.S. armed services. One survey polled 1,500 adults in the United States via telephone with a 20-minute survey. Those polled split 50-50 when asked if they supported the current policy categorically restricting women from combat assignments. 50% of those polled would allow women assigned to combat only if they volunteered. 50% of those polled favored drafting or conscripting women during national emergencies or wartime. However, 65% of those polled opposed requiring married women with children assigned to combat.

The second survey mailed questionnaires to 8000 members of the U.S. armed services. Overall, 57% of the respondents supported the current policy categorically restricting women from combat assignments. 72% of the respondents currently assigned to combat supported the current policy. 78% of the respondents serving in the Marine Corps supported the current policy.,

- Moskos Survey

Dr. Charles Moskos (a member of the commission) and Ms. Laura Miller, both of Northwestern University, conducted a survey of 1651 U.S. Army soldiers on the roles of women in the U.S. armed services in 1992. Of the women soldiers surveyed, over 70% favored allowing women volunteers to serve in combat roles, but only 12% said they would volunteer.

- Navy Personnel Research and Development Center

The NPRDC conducted longitudinal studies covering 1988, 1990, and 1992 on reasons for time lost from active duty by Navy personnel. They reported to the commission that pregnancy rates among women Naval personnel were similar to those in the civilian population. Their studies found that single parents had negligible effect on naval activities. They further found that naval personnel held the perception that pregnant women adversely affected ship operations.

- Commission Survey of Retired Flag and General Officers

The commission conducted its own survey of the 6,109 known retired flag and general officers in four all branches of the U.S. armed services. Those surveyed were overwhelmingly white males. A little over half responded, with the representation ranging from 70% from the Marine Corps to 41% from the Navy. A majority of respondents opposed assigning combat roles to women. The degree of opposition correlated directly to the age of the respondents; older respondents voiced greater opposition to assigning women to combat than younger respondents. The biggest concern 56%) of the majority was that women's presence would adversely affect combat unit cohesion.

== Fact-finding trips by commission members to Armed Services installations ==
- Air Force = 5 installations visited

--4th Composite Wing internal, Seymour Johnson AFB, NC
--USAF Weapons and Tactics Center, Nellis AFB, NV (2 visits)
--Survival, Evasion, Resistance, and Escape School, Fairchild AFB, WA
--HQ US Central Command, MacDill AFB, FL
--HQ, US Special Ops Command, MacDill AFB, FL

- Army = 5 installations visited

--4th Infantry Division, Fort Carson, CO
--1st Infantry Division, Fort Riley, KS
--24th Mechanized Infantry Division, Fort Stewart, GA
--XVIII Airborne Corps, Fort Bragg, SC
--U.S. Military Academy, West Point, NY

- Foreign Military Representatives = 6 countries consulted

--Canada
--Denmark
--Israel
--Russia
--The Netherlands
--United Kingdom

- Marines = 4 installations visited

--II Marine Expeditionary Force, Camp Lejeune, NC
--Marine Corps Recruit Depot, Parris Island, SC
--USMC Air-Ground Combat Center Twentynine Palms, CA
--USMC Officer Candidate and Basic Schools, Quantico, VA

- Navy = 9 installations visited

--U.S. Naval Academy, Annapolis, MD
--Norfolk Naval Station, Norfolk, VA
--Navy Fighter Weapons School, NAS Miramar, CA
--Navy Surface Fleet, Pacific, Naval Station 32nd Street, CA
--Navy Special Warfare Command, Naval Amphibious Base, CA
--Aircraft Static Display, Naval Air Station Glenview, IL
--Carrier Air Wing 3, USS John F. Kennedy
--Submarine Group Ten, NSB Kings Bay, GA
--Commander Submarine Fleet Atlantic (ComSubLant), Naval Station, Norfolk, VA

- Others = 2 installations

--General Dynamics, Ft. Worth, TX
--Aeromedical Seminar, San Antonio, TX

== Formal commission meetings ==
(Dates, location, and simple description)

March 25, 1992 Washington, DC

Initial meeting

March 26, 1992 Washington, DC

Survey of existing research

April 6–7, 1992 Washington, DC

Defense Dept. physical fitness standards, demographics of armed services personnel, status of women in the Army, Navy, Marine Corps, and Air Force

May 4–5, 1992 Washington, DC

Review information resources from the GAO, media, public opinion, "think tanks", Congress, and legal writings.

June 8–9, 1992 Washington, DC

Testimony on women's in "non-traditional roles"; service specific definition of "combat"; prisoners of war issues; 5 other discussion topics

June 25–26, 1992 Washington, DC

Members of Congress testimony; 8 sets of witnesses on various personnel issues

July 13–15, 1992 Chicago, IL

Midwest perspectives; theological perspectives; mixed-gender armed services units' perspectives

August 6–8, 1992 Los Angeles, CA

West Coast perspectives; theological perspectives; single-gender armed services units' perspectives; perceived combat "role" for each armed service

August 27–29, 1992 Dallas, TX

Women's rights advocates; Southern perspectives; theological perspectives; legal implication of any Commission recommendations; review fact-finding reports; witnesses on aircraft: bombers, fighters, helicopters; witnesses on combat support and combat service support; witnesses on field artillery

September 10–12, 1992 Washington, DC

Review Commission panel findings; theological perspectives; Commissioner-generated testimonies; surveys of Army women and women Army officers

October 1–3, 1992 Washington, DC

Miscellaneous reports; review Commission panel findings; review surveys' findings; Commissioners discuss final report formats

October 22–24, 1992 Washington, DC

Approve findings; discuss issues

November 1–3, 1992 Washington, DC

Discuss, deliberate, and vote on Recommendations

November 9–10, 1992 Washington, DC

Review and approve final draft of report

November 15, 1992 Washington, DC

Final Report transmitted to the President

December 15, 1992 Washington, DC

Final Report transmitted to Congress

== Findings and recommendations ==
A. Quotas and Goals

Quotas should be avoided at all costs as they tend to be biased and discriminatory. "Best qualified" should be the sole criterion for assignments open to both genders.
Commission vote—Yes=9, No=6, Abs=0

B. Voluntary vs. Involuntary Duty

A voluntary assignment policy would hinder combat readiness and effectiveness. A gender-neutral assignment policy for qualified persons should be used. The term "qualified" is determined solely by law and policy.
Commission vote—Yes=10, No=2, Abs=3

C. Fitness/Wellness Standards

Current good health practices are not linked either to specific assignments or gender but rather to the highest levels of general fitness/wellness for the armed services.
Commission vote—Yes=12, No=0, Abs=1, NV=2

D. Occupational Physical Requirements

The armed services should adopt specific requirements for those occupational specializations requiring muscular strength, endurance, or cardio-vascular capacity without regard to gender.
Commission vote—Yes=9, No=4, Abs=2

E. Basic Training Standards

Entry-level physical training may be gender-specific as necessary for specific assignments.
Commission vote—Yes=8, No=6, Abs=1

F. Pre-Commissioning Standards

Physical training in the military academies, officer candidate schools, and the Reserve Officer Training Corps already have appropriate gender-neutral and gender-specific programs in place. These programs do not appear to compromise either combat performance or combat readiness.
Commission vote—Yes=10, No=4, Abs=1

G. Gender-Related Occupational Standards

Gender-neutral muscular strength, endurance, and cardiovascular capacity requirements may be adopted for those specialties for which they are relevant.
Commission vote—Yes=14, No=0, Abs=0, NV=1

H. Parental and Family Police

The Defense Department should review all policies regarding single and dual-service parents. Policies on recruitment, retention, deployment, and child care for such personnel require either new policies or better implementation of existing policies.
Commission vote—Yes=9, No=0, Abs=1, NV=5

I. Pregnancy and Deployability Policies

Consistency of application and force readiness should drive Defense Department policies regarding pregnancy. Current pregnancy rates among women aviators do not hamper unit performance or readiness.
Commission vote—Yes=8, No=0, Abs=2, NV=5

J. Combat Roles for Women

While circumstances exist where female personnel may be assigned to combat situations, unit readiness for combat should be the main policy concern.
Commission vote—Yes=8, No=1, Abs=1, NV=5

K. Ground Combat

Women may not be assigned to direct land combat units.
Commission vote—Yes=10, No=0, Abs=2, NV=5

L. Combat Aircraft

Women may not be assigned to fly in combat-mission aircraft. "The one vote margin by which this issue was resolved illustrates the deeply divided views that exist to the assignment of women to combat aircraft"
Commission vote—Yes=8, No=7, Abs=0

M. Combatant Vessels

Women may be assigned to all naval vessels except amphibious craft and submarines. The navy should modify vessels to accommodate women when needed as part of normally scheduled maintenance.
Commission vote—Yes=8, No=6, Abs=1

N. Special Operations

Retain the existing policies excluding female personnel from assignment to Special Forces.

Commission vote—Yes=14, No=0, Abs=0, NV=1

O. "Risk Rule"

The "risk rule" is standard operating procedure whereby the exposure of women members of the armed services to situations involving injury, death, or capture is avoided. The "risk rule" should be retained except for women serving on naval vessels.
Commission vote—Yes=9, No=4, Abs=2

P. Transition Process

The further integration of female personnel into existing military units should be done according to an individual's physical and professional qualifications for the assignment. This transition period should proceed in a timely fashion adhering to best operating procedures. Modifications of existing equipment and facilities for women personnel should be carried out during scheduled routine maintenance
Commission vote—Yes=11, No=3, Abs=1

Q. Conscription

Women should be excluded from any draft or conscription for required military service.
Commission vote—Yes=11, No=3, Abs=0, NV=1

== Alternative views ==
Five members of the commission — Cockerham, Donnelly, O'Beirne, Ray, and White - wrote a 38 page section in the Final Report entitled "The Case Against Women in Combat". They argued that the proponents of assigning women to combat did not prove the necessity of their case. The five members repeated and emphasized the evidence and personal testimony the Commission collected that cast doubt on combat roles for women. "Most importantly", they stated, "(combat roles for women) would overturn two centuries of settled law and military policy based on deeply held and commonly shared cultural assumptions defining how men should treat women".

== See also ==
- Women in the Military: United States
- Women in warfare (1945-1999)
- Women in warfare (2000-present)

== Sources ==
- The Presidential Commission on the Assignment of Women in the Armed Forces: Report to the President, November 15, 1992. Washington, DC: GPO, 1992. 1 volume of various pagination. Cited in the text as "Final Report"
- Encyclopedia of Governmental Advisory Organizations Detroit, MI: Gale, 1998-1999. Entry number 1958.
