= Elaine Donnelly =

American conservative activist and anti-feminist

- Occupation: Conservative activist
- Writing career
- Genre: Non-fiction
- Subject: Feminism

Elaine Donnelly is an American conservative activist and anti-feminist principally concerned with preserving the traditional culture of the U.S. military. She is a contributing editor at Human Events magazine. She is the founder of the Center for Military Readiness which opposes the service of gay and transgender people and favors limiting the positions open to women in the military. It has been described as a right-wing organisation by the Southern Poverty Law Center and other sources.

Elaine Chenevert Donnelly attended Schoolcraft College and the University of Detroit. She lives in Livonia, Michigan, with her husband, Terry, and is the mother of two daughters.

== Activism and employment ==
Donnelly spent several years as an activist in opposition to the Equal Rights Amendment as National Media Chair of Phyllis Schlafly's Eagle Forum and then founded the Michigan Stop-ERA Committee. She was active in Ronald Reagan's presidential campaign. She told an interviewer that her political engagement began with concern that initiatives to extend the rights of women would result in drafting women like her own daughter into the military and developed to the broader issue of women's participation in the military.

In 1984, Secretary of Defense Caspar Weinberger appointed her to a three-year term on the Defense Department Advisory Committee on Women in the Services.

In 1992, she served as a member of the Presidential Commission on the Assignment of Women in the Armed Forces, a presidential commission that considered whether women should be allowed to fly combat missions, and joined the 8–7 majority that opposed such an expanded role in combat for women. In 2009, she maintained that opposition when the roles available to women were expanding during combat in Afghanistan and Iraq.

English professor and folklorist Carol Burke, in her 2004 study of the culture of the U.S. military, says:

Elaine Donnelly, a protege of Phyllis Schlafly's, organized a concerted effort to inhibit women's advancement into nontraditional roles. Through her Center for Military Readiness, Donnelly staunchly fought any progress in this area and singled out for special attack the Defense Advisory Committee on Women in the Services ...

== Views on women in the military ==
Donnelly opposes the idea that women should be considered interchangeable with men in direct ground combat (see Women in combat).

Donelly argues that reducing requirements in terms of female recruits' ability to handle physically demanding tasks may reduce the effectiveness of the whole unit, and stated that "... there are separate gender-specific standards for the throwing of hand-grenades, primarily because comprehensive tests at Parris Island in 1987 and 1990 found that 45% of female Marines could not throw a live grenade safely beyond the 15 meter bursting radius". Another opponent of gender norming, economist Walter E. Williams, states that "[o]fficers who insist that females be held accountable to the same high standards as males are seen by higher brass as obstructionist and risk their careers".

Donnelly cited as evidence that the military was applying a "double standard" to men and women in the military the case of Lamar S. Owens Jr., a United States Naval Academy student expelled in 2007, though found innocent of rape and sentenced to "no punishment" for conduct unbecoming an officer, while his female accuser was not punished. She has said that "the concept of equality does not fit in combat environments... Women in combat units endanger male morale and military performance." She has objected to allowing women to serve on submarines because the air quality poses "a high-risk cause of birth defects in unborn children—particularly in the early weeks of gestation when a woman may not even know she is pregnant". She said admiral Michael Mullen was "thoughtlessly pushing for co-ed submarines, apparently to please military and civilian feminists".

== Views on LGBT people in the military ==
Donnelly opposes allowing LGBT people to openly serve in the military. In 2006, she called the growing effort to repeal the U.S. military's "Don't ask, don't tell" (DADT) policy that prohibited service by open LGBT people, "a big P.R. campaign". She said that "the law is there to protect good order and discipline in the military, and it's not going to change." In March 2009, Donnelly gathered the signatures of more than a thousand retired military officers in opposition to the repeal of DADT, a letter cited by senator John McCain in Senate hearings.

== Views of her critics ==
The Palm Center's Aaron Belkin, who opposes Donnelly's positions on military personnel issues, has written that she "runs the brilliantly named Center for Military Readiness out of her living room in Livonia, Michigan." He called her "the most prominent purveyor of the politics of paranoia" and an "archconservative who has spent years vilifying both gays and women in the military."

Writing about a report that Donnelly compiled from stolen documents in the Kara Hultgreen case, Susan Barnes, an attorney for another female pilot mentioned in the report, stated that "the Report MISREPRESENTS the content of those training records. I know. I have read the Report and have compared it to the content of the training records.” She also described the CMR as "a radical right front for a woman named Elaine Donnelly who has a long, and very public, record of opposition to military women.”

Donnelly has deposited some of her papers at the University of Michigan's Bentley Historical Library.

== Select works ==
- "Constructing the Co-Ed Military". Duke Journal of Gender Law & Policy. 14. May 2007.
- "Defending the Culture of the Military". Attitudes Aren't Free: Thinking Deeply about Diversity in the US Armed Forces. Defense Department Social Policy Perspectives (Air University Press). 2010. ISBN 978-0982018521.
