= Michael H. Miller =

United States Navy Vice Admiral

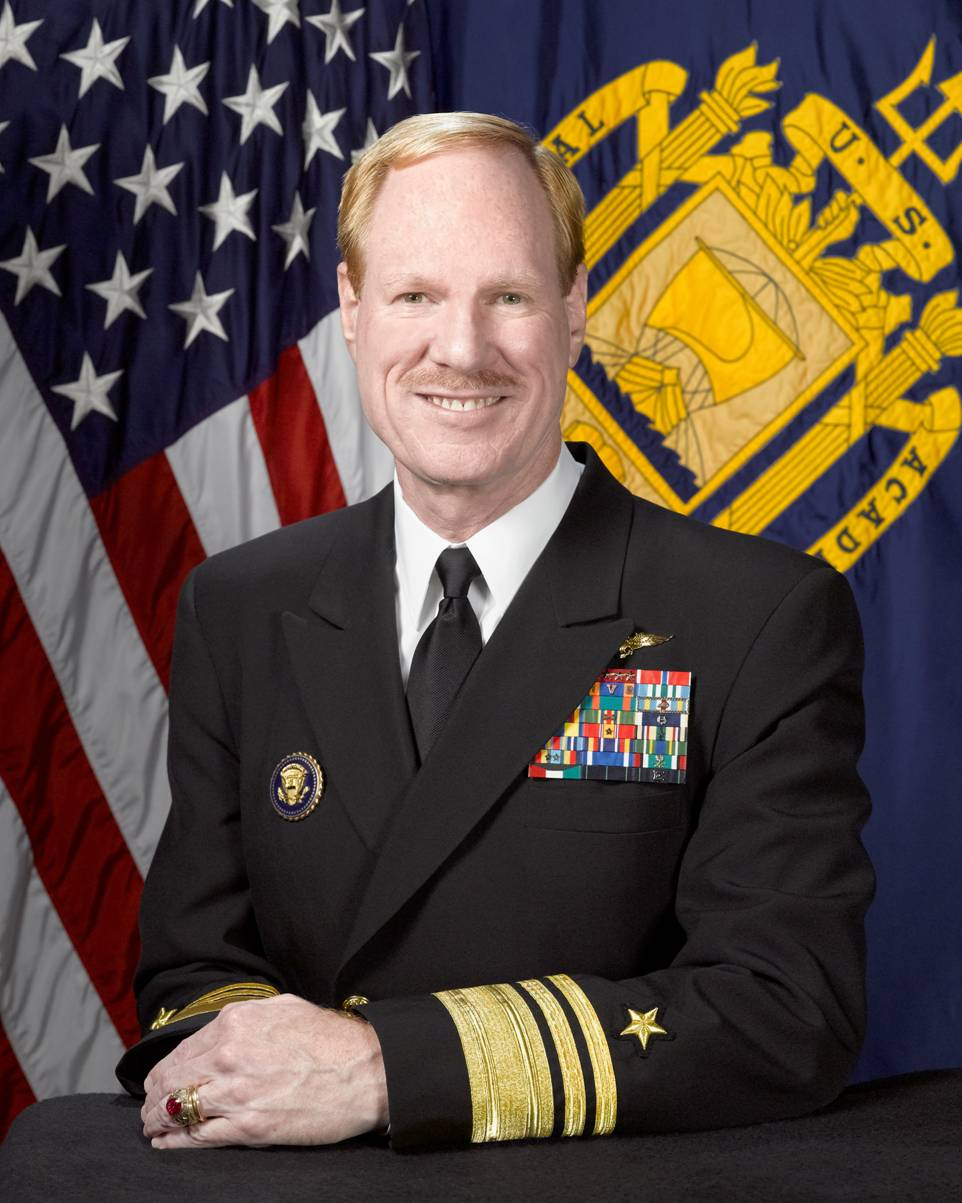
- Official portrait, 2010

61st Superintendent of the United States Naval Academy
- In office 3 August 2010 – 23 July 2014
- Preceded by: Jeffrey Fowler
- Succeeded by: Walter E. Carter Jr.

Personal details
- Born: 9 July 1952 (age 74) Minot, North Dakota, U.S.
- Military career
- Alma mater: United States Naval Academy (BS)
- Allegiance: United States of America United States Navy
- Service years: 1974–2015
- Rank: Vice Admiral
- Commands: USS John F. Kennedy (CV-67); USS Coronado (AGF-11); Carrier Strike Group Seven; Ronald Reagan Carrier Strike Group
- Awards: Defense Distinguished Service Medal; Navy Distinguished Service Medal; Legion of Merit (6 awards); Bronze Star; Air Medal; Meritorious Service Medal (3 awards)

Michael Harold "Mike" Miller (born 9 July 1952) is a former Vice Admiral in the United States Navy, and was the first active-duty officer to direct the White House Military Office. He was the 61st Superintendent of the United States Naval Academy.

== Education and early career ==
Miller was awarded a Bachelor of Science degree and commissioned at the United States Naval Academy in 1974. He earned his "Wings of Gold" and was designated a Naval Aviator at Pensacola in January 1976. Subsequent flying tours were primarily out of NAS Cecil Field, Florida, flying the S-3A/B Viking on deployments around the world, including combat operations against Libya, the Achille Lauro incident, and squadron command of VS-24 in the Persian Gulf during Desert Shield/Desert Storm.

Miller's shore assignments include duty as Flag Lieutenant and Aide to the Deputy Commander in Chief, U. S. Atlantic Fleet (1979), Chief Staff Officer to Sea Strike Wing One (1986), and Executive Assistant to the Commander, Naval Air Forces Pacific (1994).

Miller has served at sea as Air Operations Officer for Commander, Carrier Group 8, Executive Officer on board USS John F. Kennedy (CV-67), and in command of the Third Fleet Flagship, USS Coronado (AGF-11). During this tour, he was responsible for a state-of-the-art technology infusion into the command ship for the eastern Pacific.

== Career ==
Following Coronado, Miller was assigned as the Operations Officer for the Seventh Fleet on board USS Blue Ridge (LCC-19), home ported in Yokosuka, Japan. He returned to John F. Kennedy in August 1999 as her 23rd Commanding Officer, and left almost immediately for an extended deployment to the Persian Gulf. He reported for duty as the deputy director of the White House Military Office (WHMO) in November 2000. Miller was commissioned as a Deputy Assistant to the President and the first-ever active duty Director of the White House Military Office in November 2002.

Miller assumed command of Carrier Strike Group Seven/Ronald Reagan Strike Group on 15 April 2005. His next posting in 2008 was as Chief of the Navy's Office of Legislative Affairs.

=== Superintendent ===
On 3 August 2010, Miller relieved Vice Admiral Jeffrey Fowler as Superintendent of the United States Naval Academy. On 23 July 2014, Vice Admiral Walter E. Carter Jr. relieved Miller as Superintendent. Secretary of the Navy Ray Mabus presented the Navy Distinguished Service Medal as an end-of-tour award to Miller. During the ceremony, Miller had been slated to retire after 40 years of active naval service.

== Retirement ==
Miller retired from the Navy on 1 August 2015, after over 41 years of service. He and Barbara have decided to stay in Annapolis close to his Alma Mater to see his 2 second sons Brock 29' and Brady 31' graduate from USNA:)

== Awards and decorations ==

Naval Aviator insignia
Defense Distinguished Service Medal
Navy Distinguished Service Medal	Legion of Merit with one silver award star	Bronze Star
Meritorious Service Medal with two award stars	Air Medal with gold award numeral 1, Combat V and bronze Strike/Flight numeral 5	Joint Service Commendation Medal
Navy Commendation Medal with award star	Navy and Marine Corps Achievement Medal	Joint Meritorious Unit Award with one bronze oak leaf cluster
Navy Unit Commendation with one bronze service star	Navy Unit Commendation with two service stars	Navy E Ribbon with wreathed Battle E Device
Navy Expeditionary Medal	National Defense Service Medal with service star	Southwest Asia Service Medal with service star
Global War on Terrorism Expeditionary Medal	Global War on Terrorism Service Medal	Korea Defense Service Medal
Navy Sea Service Deployment Ribbon with six service stars	NATO Medal for the former Yugoslavia	Kuwait Liberation Medal (Saudi Arabia)
Kuwait Liberation Medal (Kuwait)	Navy Rifle Marksmanship Ribbon	Navy Expert Pistol Shot Medal
Presidential Service Badge

Academic offices
Preceded by Jeffrey Fowler	61st Superintendent of United States Naval Academy; 2010–2014	Succeeded by Walter E. Carter Jr.
