= Richard J. Naughton =

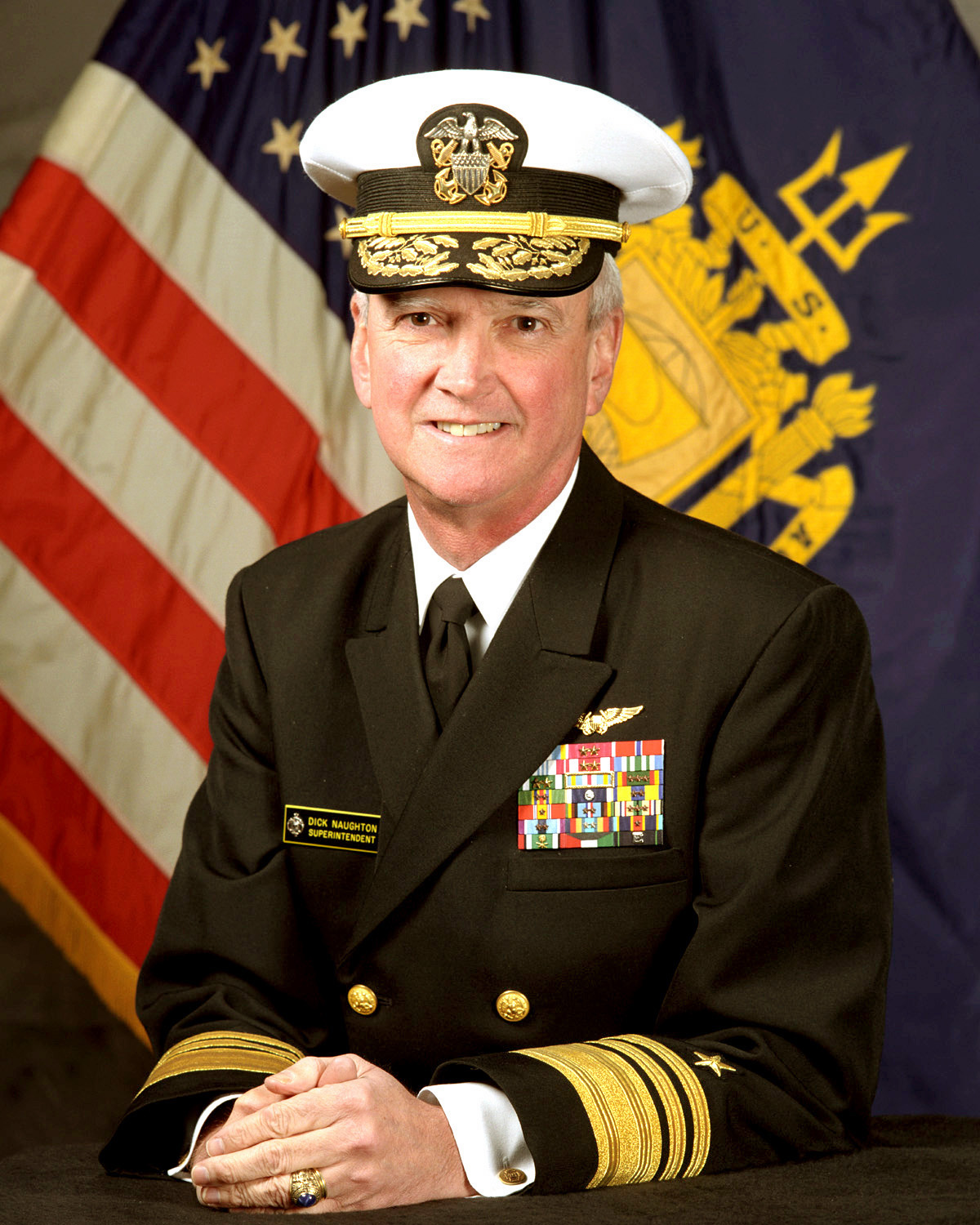
- Naughton as a vice admiral
- Born: October 5, 1946; Cedar Rapids, Iowa, U.S.
- Died: February 25, 2011 (aged 64); San Diego, California, U.S.
- Military career
- Allegiance: United States of America
- Service years: 1968–2003
- Rank: Rear Admiral (reduced from Vice Admiral)
- Commands: Superintendent, U.S. Naval Academy; Commander, Naval Strike and Air Warfare Center, NAS Fallon; Commander, Carrier Group FOUR/Carrier Striking Force
- Conflicts: Gulf War
- Awards: Defense Superior Service Medal; Legion of Merit (two awards); Bronze Star; Defense Meritorious Service Medal; Meritorious Service Medal (two awards); Joint Service Commendation Medal; Navy Commendation Medal (three awards)

Rear Admiral Richard Joseph Naughton (October 5, 1946 – February 25, 2011) was the superintendent of the U.S. Naval Academy from 2002 to 2003.

== Navy career ==
Designated a Naval Flight Officer in 1969, Rear Admiral Naughton was initially assigned to Fighter Squadron 84, for the F-14 Tomcat, and was assigned to Fighter Squadron TWENTY FOUR, where he participated in the squadron's first F-14 deployment in USS Constellation. In 1978, he reported to his next assignment as aide and flag lieutenant to commander, Fleet Air Western Pacific, home ported in Atsugi, Japan.

In 1980, Rear Admiral Naughton reported to Fighter Squadron 111, and made deployments to the Western Pacific and Indian Ocean in USS Kitty Hawk and USS Carl Vinson. Rear Admiral Naughton joined the staff of Commander, Naval Air Forces, US Pacific Fleet in 1983, where he served as Fighter and Airborne Early Warning Training Officer.

Rear Admiral Naughton returned to Fighter Squadron 24 for his next assignment as executive officer. He assumed command of the squadron in April 1985. During this tour, VF-24 made deployments in USS Ranger and again in USS Kitty Hawk. VF-24 was awarded the Meritorious Unit Commendation during his tenure as commanding officer.

Following squadron command, Rear Admiral Naughton reported to Cruiser Destroyer Group FIVE as air operations officer and once again deployed in USS Kitty Hawk. In February 1987, Rear Admiral Naughton began Navy Nuclear Power Training, and reported to USS Enterprise as executive officer in October 1988.

On 5 January 1991, Rear Admiral Naughton assumed command of USS New Orleans. During her nine-month deployment to the Persian Gulf, USS New Orleans landed Marines in Kuwait in support of Operation Desert Storm ground offensive, and served as the United States flagship for coalition minesweeping operations in the harbors of Kuwait. He detached on 29 July 1992 to attend Aircraft Carrier Prospective Commanding Officer (PCO) training.

On 27 August 1993, Rear Admiral Naughton assumed command of USS Enterprise. During his command, he supervised a $2.1 billion refueling of the USS Enterprise nuclear plant. He led a 5,000-man crew through an intense shipyard refit, nuclear qualifications, and a multimillion-dollar ship's force habitability project. He re-energized a shipyard overhaul that was $100 million over budget and behind schedule. Teamed with all levels of Newport News Shipbuilding, the ship was delivered in 15 months and on budget. His shipyard acumen resulted in a comprehensive Navy-wide study for other shipyard projects and, more importantly, phase two of the overhaul was completed 17% ahead of schedule and $30M under budget. Enterprise returned to the fleet with the most modern C4I systems and engineering plant on schedule and under budget. He detached on 2 February 1996.

In 1996, Rear Admiral Naughton reported to the staff of Joint Task Force-South West Asia in Riyadh, Saudi Arabia, where he served as deputy director of operations before assuming duties as deputy commander in 1999.

From 1996 to 1998, he was director for plans and policy (J-5) United States Transportation Command where he developed an innovative strategy for worldwide transportation and supply chain distribution. This included the first application of radio frequency tracking tags for military cargo and distributed in transit visibility by customers. He adjudicated critical concept development for future time phased deployment needs of equipment and resources in times of crisis worldwide and orchestrated the first-ever Voluntary Intermodal Sealift Agreement that gives military access to the Global Intermodal Transportation System at a predetermined cost during time of conflict. Personally awarded the Vice President of the United States Hammer Award for outstanding government and industry cooperation.

From 1998 to 2000, Naughton served as commander, Carrier Group FOUR/Carrier Striking Force where he trained all deploying battle groups (over 100,000 sailors and marines) within the Atlantic area of responsibility and ensured all commanders were fully prepared for any contingency, had maintenance support, supply infrastructure and the proper skills to fight and win around the world. He was responsible for coordinating installations and testing with Sea, Air and Space Systems Commands to ensure configuration control and supply support for every aircraft and ship that deployed. His innovative approach completely changed and streamlined the training process increasing readiness while reducing costs.

From 2000 to 2002, he served as commander, Naval Strike & Air Warfare Center, Naval Air Station Fallon, NV, where he led a team in developing significant skills to fly high performance aircraft in the most difficult environment. He consolidated eleven advanced training organizations, brought online a unique reach back command and control system for deployed war fighters at a fraction of original cost estimates, and trained every deploying Battle Group /Airwing team that served in Afghanistan and Iraq. These initiatives reduced cost and significantly improved readiness.

Naughton's last assignment in the Navy was as Superintendent of the United States Naval Academy, an organization of over 4,000 midshipmen and 3,000 support staff with an annual budget responsibility of $220 million. He was relieved of duty on May 16, 2003, after physically assaulting an enlisted Marine gate guard returning to the academy following a New Year's Eve party in his first year. The decision to relieve him was based on a Navy Inspector General (IG) investigation into the allegation that he grabbed the sentry's wrist. Though a vice admiral at the time, he was reprimanded and retired at the lower rank of rear admiral (upper half).

== Decorations ==
- Defense Superior Service Medal
- Legion of Merit with Gold Star
- Bronze Star
- Defense Meritorious Service Medal
- Meritorious Service Medal with Gold Star
- Joint Service Commendation Medal
- Navy and Marine Corps Commendation Medal with two Gold Stars

== Education ==
- B.S. United States Naval Academy, 1968
- M.S. Aeronautical Engineering, Naval Postgraduate School, 1973
- Aeronautical Engineer Degree, Naval Postgraduate School, 1974
- Industrial College of the Armed Forces, 1993

== Post-Navy Career ==
Naughton became a director of Xenonics Holdings, Inc in May 2004, and later became chief executive officer in April 2005, and then a consultant. He was also president of International Data Security (IDS).

He died February 25, 2011, in San Diego.

== See also ==
- List of superintendents of the United States Naval Academy

Academic offices
Preceded by John R. Ryan	Superintendent of United States Naval Academy; 2002–2003	Succeeded by Rodney P. Rempt
