= G.I. Jane =

1997 film by Ridley Scott

- Theatrical release poster
- Directed by: Ridley Scott
- Screenplay by: David Twohy; Danielle Alexandra
- Story by: Danielle Alexandra
- Produced by: Ridley Scott; Roger Birnbaum; Demi Moore; Suzanne Todd
- Starring: Demi Moore; Viggo Mortensen; Anne Bancroft
- Cinematography: Hugh Johnson
- Edited by: Pietro Scalia
- Music by: Trevor Jones
- Production companies: Hollywood Pictures; Caravan Pictures; Roger Birnbaum Productions; Largo Entertainment; Scott Free Productions
- Distributed by: Buena Vista Pictures Distribution (Select territories); Largo Entertainment (International)
- Release date: August 22, 1997
- Running time: 124 minutes
- Country: United States
- Language: English
- Budget: $50 million
- Box office: $98.4 million

G.I. Jane is a 1997 American action drama film directed by Ridley Scott and starring Demi Moore, Viggo Mortensen, and Anne Bancroft. The film tells the fictional story of the first woman to undergo special operations training similar to the U.S. Navy SEALs.

The film was produced by Scott Free Productions, and Caravan Pictures, and distributed in select territories by Buena Vista Pictures through the Hollywood Pictures label and overseas by Largo Entertainment. Though it received generally favorable reviews and Moore's performance received some praise, she still won the Razzie Award for Worst Actress, which is commonly attributed to her role in the critically panned Striptease the year prior. It opened at No. 1 at the US box office, where it remained for two weeks, ultimately grossing $98.4 million worldwide on a $50 million budget. The film grossed over $22 million in VHS and DVD rentals. In her autobiography Inside Out, Moore called G.I. Jane her proudest professional achievement.

== Plot ==
A Senate Armed Services Committee interviews a candidate for the position of Secretary of the Navy. Senator Lillian DeHaven from Texas criticizes the Navy for not being gender-neutral. Behind the curtains, a deal is struck: if women compare favorably with men in a series of test cases, the military will integrate women fully into all occupations of the Navy.

The first test is the training course of the U.S. Navy Combined Reconnaissance Team. Senator DeHaven selects topographical analyst Lieutenant Jordan O'Neil because she is physically more feminine than the other candidates.

To make the grade, O'Neil must survive a grueling selection program in which almost sixty percent of candidates wash out, most before the fourth week, with the third week being particularly intensive ("hell week"). The enigmatic Command Master Chief John James Urgayle runs the training program that involves 20-hour days of tasks designed to wear down recruits' physical and mental strength, including pushing giant ship fenders up beach dunes, working through obstacle courses, and hauling landing rafts. Even though O’Neil outranks Urgayle, he is in charge of training, and O’Neil has to fight for her spot like all the others.

Given a 30-second "gender-norming" allowance in an obstacle course, O'Neil demands to be held to the same standards as the male trainees. The master chief observes O'Neil helping the other candidates by allowing them to climb on her back to make it over the wall obstacle course. Eight weeks into the program, during SERE training in Captiva, Florida, the Master Chief ties her to a chair with her hands behind her back, grabs hold of her and slams her through the door, picks her up off the floor, and repeatedly dunks her head in ice-cold water in front of the other crew members. O'Neil retaliates and is successful in causing him some injury, despite her immobilized arms. In so doing, she acquires respect from him, as well as from the other trainees.

Navy leaders, confident that a woman would quickly drop out, become concerned. The media learn of O'Neil's involvement, and she becomes a sensation known as "G.I. Jane" and "Joan of Arc." Soon, she must contend with trumped-up charges that she is a lesbian and is fraternizing with women. O'Neil is told that she will be given a desk job during the investigation and, if cleared, will need to repeat her training from the beginning. She decides to "ring out" (ringing a bell three times, signaling her voluntary withdrawal from the program) rather than accept a desk job.

It is later revealed that the photo evidence of O'Neil's alleged fraternization came from Senator DeHaven's office. DeHaven never intended for O'Neil to succeed; she used O'Neil as a bargaining chip to prevent military base closings in her home state of Texas. O'Neil threatens to expose DeHaven, who then has the charges voided and O'Neil restored to the program.

The final phase of training, an operational readiness exercise, is interrupted by an emergency that requires the CRT trainees' support. The situation involves a reconnaissance satellite powered by weapons-grade plutonium that fell into the Libyan desert. A team of U.S. Army Rangers is dispatched to retrieve the plutonium, but their evacuation plan fails, and the trainees are sent to assist the Rangers. The Master Chief's shooting of a Libyan soldier to protect O'Neil leads to a confrontation with a Libyan patrol. During the mission, O'Neil, using her experience as a topographical analyst, realizes when she sees the team's map that the Master Chief is not going to use the route the others believe he will in regrouping with the others. She also displays a definitive ability in leadership and strategy while rescuing the injured Master Chief, whom she and McCool pull out of an explosives-laden "kill zone." With helicopter gunships delivering the final assault to the defenders, the rescue mission is a success.

Upon their return, all those who participated in the mission are accepted to the CRT. Urgayle gives O'Neil his Navy Cross and a well-worn copy of Selected Poems by D. H. Lawrence, containing a short poem, "Self-pity", as acknowledgment of her accomplishment and in gratitude for rescuing him.

== Cast ==
- Demi Moore as Lieutenant Jordan O'Neil
- Viggo Mortensen as Command Master Chief John "Jack" James Urgayle
- Jason Beghe as Lieutenant Commander Royce Harper
- Scott Wilson as Captain Salem
- Anne Bancroft as Senator Lillian DeHaven
- Lucinda Jenney as Lieutenant Blondell
- Morris Chestnut as Lieutenant McCool
- Josh Hopkins as Ensign F. Lee "Flea" Montgomery
- Jim Caviezel as "Slov" Slovnik
- Angel David as Newberry
- Boyd Kestner as Lieutenant "Wick" Wickwire
- Kevin Gage as Instructor Max Pyro
- David Vadim as Sergeant First Class Cortez
- Gregg Bello as Miller
- Stephen Ramsey as Stamm
- Daniel Von Bargen as Secretary of the Navy Theodore Hayes
- David Warshofsky as Instructor Johns
- John Michael Higgins as Chief of Staff
- Dimitri Diatchenko as Trainee

== Release ==
Release of G.I. Jane had been delayed by a week by Buena Vista Pictures and the film opened up against the comedy Money Talks from New Line Cinema. Both studios predicted their film would earn $11.1 million and be number 1 at the box office. Buena Vista held sneak previews to generate positive word of mouth for the film. Phil Barlow, president of distribution for Buena Vista, said: "We knew from the research that people loved the movie". He further said: "All we had to do was get them in." Variety attributed audience reticence to the declining popularity of actress Demi Moore.

== Reception ==
=== Box office ===
G.I. Jane in the U.S opened at number one, grossing $11 million in its opening weekend, playing at a total of 1,945 theaters. In its second weekend, the film stayed at number one, grossing $10.1 million. In the end the film played in a widest release of 2,043 theaters and grossed $48.1 million domestically, falling slightly short of its $50 million production budget. The film managed to break even with the worldwide box office gross, totalling almost $99 million.

=== Critical response ===
On Rotten Tomatoes, G.I. Jane has an approval rating of 54% based on reviews from 39 critics, with an average rating of 5.7/10. The site's critical consensus was: "Demi Moore admirably does her duty, but G.I. Jane's well-intentioned message is obscured by stylistic bombast and an overload of jingoism." On Metacritic, the film has a score of 62 out of 100 based on reviews from 21 critics, indicating "generally favorable" reviews. Audiences surveyed by CinemaScore gave the film a grade "A−" on scale of A to F.

Todd McCarthy of Variety called it "A very entertaining get-tough fantasy with political and feminist underpinnings." Roger Ebert of the Chicago Sun-Times wrote: "The training sequences are as they have to be: incredible rigors, survived by O'Neil. They are good cinema because Ridley Scott, the director, brings a documentary attention to them, and because Demi Moore, having bitten off a great deal here, proves she can chew it." Owen Gleiberman of Entertainment Weekly wrote: "Were women put on earth to be warriors? Demi Moore certainly was. The role of Jordan fits her as snugly as a new layer of muscle."

Deborah Brown of Empire magazine wrote: "In spite of a catalogue of downsides, including clunky dialogue, fuzzy morals and preposterous story lines, G.I. Jane does offer a perverse level of enjoyment."

Screenwriter David Twohy later reflected on Demi Moore’s performance, telling Yahoo! Entertainment: "It's the performance of her career. The movie rises or falls on her performance, and that required her to have a total, unflinching commitment to that part. And she had that commitment — I think she f***ing nailed it." He also noted that the film’s critical reception was negatively affected by the release of Striptease, adding: "She should have been nominated for G.I. Jane, and I think she would have been, too, if not for Striptease. That tainted her chances and maybe everyone's chances."

Looking back at the film, Moore herself said: "I loved working with Ridley Scott on G.I. Jane. Probably one of my favorite experiences." She added: "Being of the generation I'm from, I really wanted to find an action-oriented film, and I felt like the response I got was polite, but like I was crazy."

In a 2025 interview with Letterboxd, director Ridley Scott praised the film, declaring: “With Demi, we made a very, very good film with G.I. Jane. I think it is the best pro-women film honestly ever made, even better than Thelma & Louise. Think about what she does. And not only that—the bad guy’s Anne Bancroft, who assumes you’re going to lose. Are you kidding me?”

=== Accolades ===
Demi Moore won the Razzie Award for Worst Actress for her performance in the film. Viggo Mortensen was nominated for Worst Fake Accent at the 1997 Stinkers Bad Movie Awards but lost to Jon Voight for Anaconda and Most Wanted.

=== Home media ===
G.I. Jane was released on VHS and DVD on April 22, 1998. The only extra feature was a theatrical trailer. It was released on Blu-ray on April 3, 2007, with no extra features aside from trailers for other movies. The film was also released on LaserDisc; this release featured an audio commentary by director Ridley Scott. The film grossed $22,122,300 in rentals.

== See also ==
- Military-entertainment complex
- List of films featuring the United States Navy SEALs
- United States Navy SEAL selection and training#Women
- Chris Rock–Will Smith slapping incident, which involved a joke that referenced this film
