= Center for Military Readiness =

The Center for Military Readiness is a tax-exempt, non-profit organization founded by Elaine Donnelly, which opposes the service of gay and transgender people and favors limiting the positions open to women in the United States military. It has been described as a right-wing organisation by the SPLC and other sources.

The Center was established in 1993 following the implementation of the "Don't ask, don't tell" policy under President Bill Clinton. It is headquartered in Livonia, Michigan. Its board members include Allan C. Carlson, Frank Gaffney, David Horowitz, Frederick Kroesen, John Lenczowski, Kate O'Beirne, Carlisle Trost, Claudius E. Watts III, Faith Whittlesey, and Walter E. Williams, among others. Other members at large have included Linda Chavez, Beverly LaHaye, Phyllis Schlafly, and Wally Schirra.

It opposes allowing gay and transgender persons to serve in the military and aims to limit the number of women in the military as well as the positions open to them. Founder and president Donnelly has argued that "[w]omen in combat units endanger male morale and military performance." A 2004 study of the role of women in the U.S. military called it "the most significant organization... representing the interests of individuals opposed to the expansion of women's military opportunities that might affect troop readiness."

According to The Washington Post, after the death of pilot Kara Hultgreen "Donnelly in January 1995 began circulating leaked copies of Lohrenz's confidential records in news releases and center reports. At the time, Lojrenz was referred to as 'Pilot B.'" She then published a report that alleged that the Navy showed favoritism toward one of the first female combat pilots during training. Susan Barnes, Lohrenz's attorney stated that "the Report misrepresents the content of those training records. I know. I have read the Report and have compared it to the content of the training records." She also described the CMR as "a radical right front for a woman named Elaine Donnelly who has a long, and very public, record of opposition to military women". The pilot subsequently brought a suit for defamation against the Center, but lost because the court determined that, by virtue of her status as one of the first women to attempt to qualify as a carrier combat pilot, she was a "public figure" and needed to prove malice on the part of those who published the charge of favoritism. She appealed but the appeal was denied, with a statement that "Our conclusion about Lt. Lohrenz's public figure status does not suggest that she was not a good Naval aviator trying to do her job, and it does not penalize her for acting with 'professionalism".

In 2011 the Center boycotted the Conservative Political Action Conference due to the participation of GOProud, an LGBT membership group within the Republican Party.

== See also ==
- Sexual orientation and gender identity in the United States military
- Sexual orientation and military service
- LGBT rights opposition
- Gender norming
