= Frederick Kroesen =

American Army general (1923–2020)

Frederick Kroesen Jr.
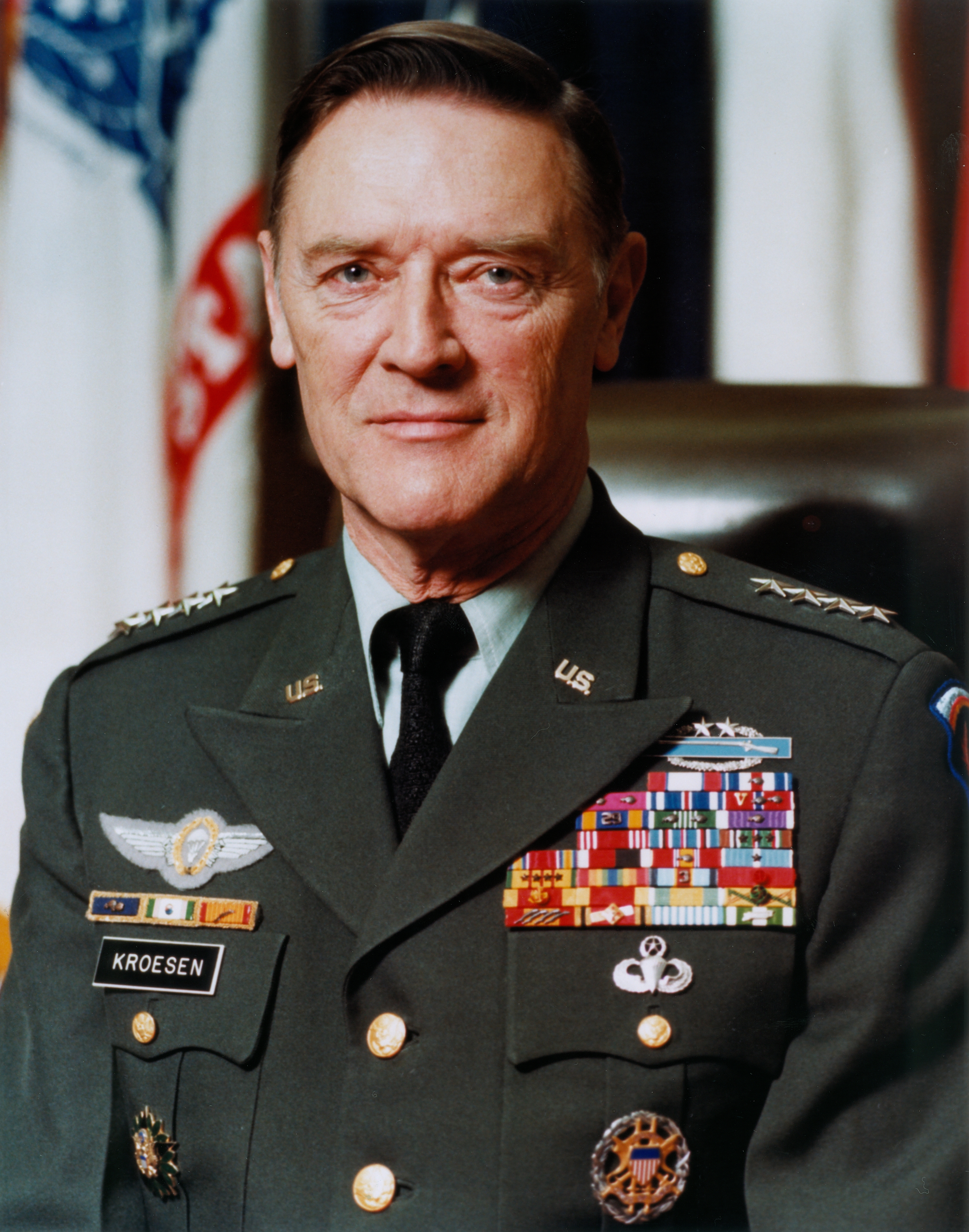
- Kroesen as commander of NATO Central Army Group
- Born: 11 February 1923; Phillipsburg, New Jersey, U.S.
- Died: 30 April 2020 (aged 97); Alexandria, Virginia, U.S.
- Burial place: Arlington National Cemetery
- Military career
- Allegiance: United States
- Branch: United States Army
- Service years: 1943–1983
- Rank: General
- Commands: NATO Central Army Group; United States Army Europe; United States Seventh Army; Vice Chief of Staff of the United States Army; United States Army Forces Command; VII Corps; 82nd Airborne Division; 23rd Infantry Division; 196th Light Infantry Brigade
- Conflicts: World War II; Korean War; Vietnam War
- Awards: Defense Distinguished Service Medal; Army Distinguished Service Medal; Silver Star (2); Legion of Merit (3); Distinguished Flying Cross; Bronze Star Medal with "V" (3)
- Other work: Chairman, Military Professional Resources Inc

Frederick James Kroesen Jr. (11 February 1923 – 30 April 2020) was a United States Army four-star general who served as the Commanding General of the Seventh United States Army and the commander of NATO Central Army Group from 1979 to 1983, and Commanding General, United States Army Forces Command from 1976 to 1978. He also served as Vice Chief of Staff of the United States Army from 1978 to 1979. He commanded troops in World War II, the Korean War, and the Vietnam War, enabling him to be one of the very small number who ever was entitled to wear the Combat Infantryman Badge with two Stars, denoting active combat in three wars.

== Early life ==
Kroesen was born in Phillipsburg, New Jersey, the son of Jean (Shillinger) and Frederick Kroesen, who worked for the New Jersey state government. His paternal ancestor, Garret Dircksen Kroesen (1638–1680) arrived in America (New Netherland) from the Netherlands around 1661. Kroesen moved to the Lawrenceville section of Lawrence Township, Mercer County, New Jersey as a child and he attended Trenton Central High School. A 1944 graduate of Rutgers University, he earned a Bachelor of Science degree in agriculture. He earned Bachelor of Arts (1962) and Master of Arts (1966) degrees in international affairs at George Washington University. In addition, he was also a member of Delta Upsilon fraternity to which his membership traces back to his days at Rutgers University.

== Military career ==
=== World War II ===
In 1944 Kroesen was commissioned through the Infantry Officer Candidate School at Fort Benning, Georgia, then fought in World War II with the 254th Infantry Regiment of the 63rd Infantry Division. He was a company grade officer, serving as platoon leader and company commander, in the fighting in the Colmar Pocket and into Germany. On the 26 and 27 January 1945, he participated in the particularly tough fighting in Jebsheim.

=== Korean War ===
During the Korean War Kroesen served in Korea with the 187th Airborne Regimental Combat Team.

=== Vietnam War ===
Kroesen was the commander of the 196th Light Infantry Brigade of the 23rd Infantry Division in 1968. He was an adviser to the assistant chief of staff, J-3, in Vietnam, and then served there as commander of the 23rd Infantry Division; deputy commander, XXIV Corps; and commanding general, First Regional Assistance Command.

=== Post-Vietnam ===
After returning from Vietnam, Kroesen served as Deputy Commander, XXIV Corps (1972), Commanding General, 82nd Airborne Division (1972–1974), Deputy Commanding General, V Corps (1974–1975) and Commanding General, VII Corps (1975–1976).

In 1976 Kroesen was promoted to the rank of four star general (O-10), becoming the first Officer Candidate School (OCS) graduate to hold that rank. He then served as Commanding General, United States Army Forces Command (1976–1978) and Vice Chief of Staff of the United States Army (1978–1979).

=== Red Army Faction attack ===
From 1979 to 1983 Kroesen served as commander of United States Army Europe and a commander of the Seventh United States Army.

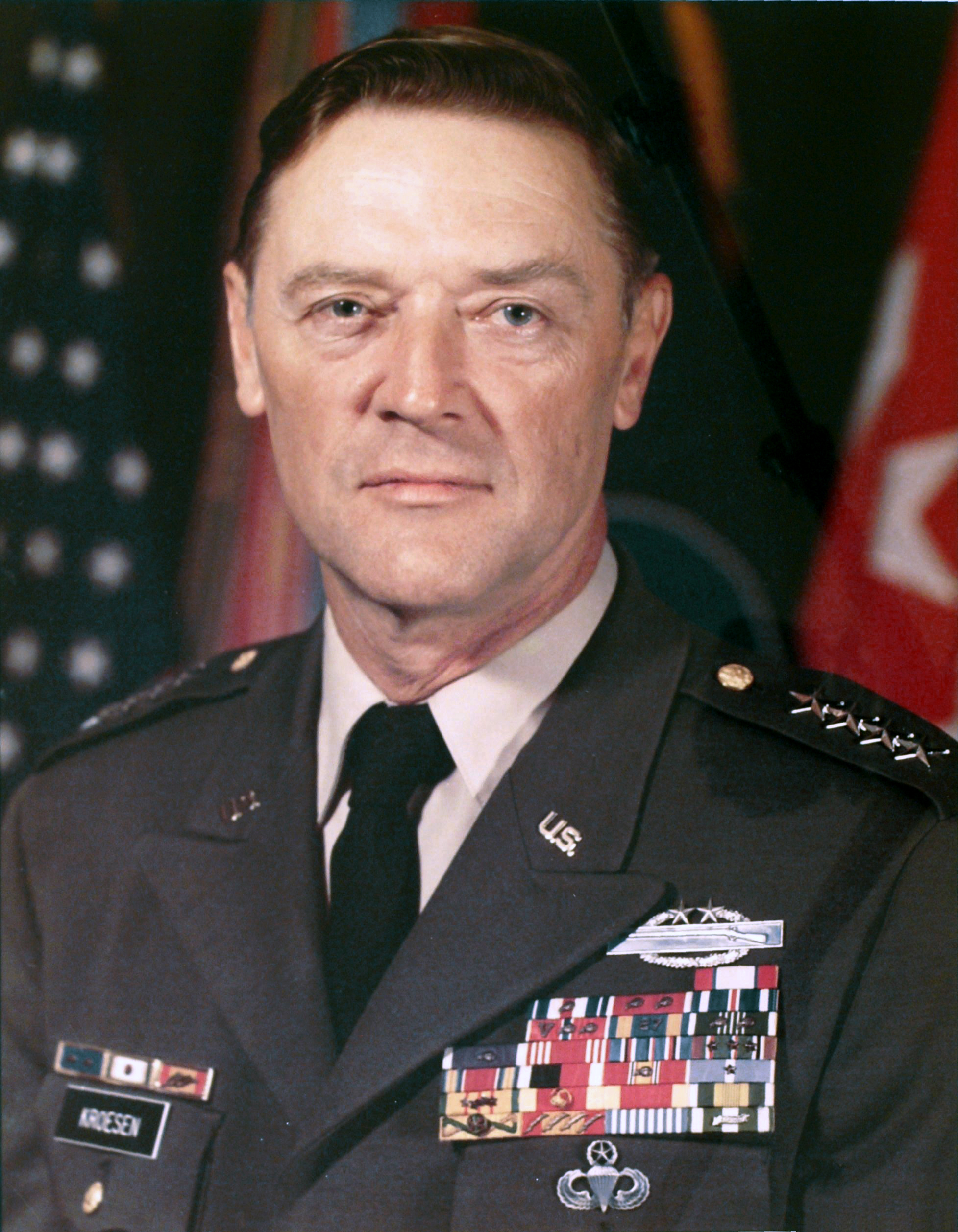
As Commander of the United States Army Forces Command

Kroesen was injured in Heidelberg on 15 September 1981, when his armoured Mercedes was targeted with an RPG-7 anti-tank rocket. Responsibility for the attack was claimed by the "Kommando Gudrun Ensslin" of the Red Army Faction (aka Baader-Meinhof Gang). In 1991, West German prosecutors announced that former East German secret police leader Erich Mielke had been indicted for collusion with the attack.

== Later life ==
After retiring from the army in 1983, Kroesen became a businessman. He was chairman of the board of Military Professional Resources Inc. (incorporated in 1987) and a senior fellow at the Institute of Land Warfare of the Association of the United States Army. He was a vice-president of the American Security Council Foundation. General Kroesen was a Compatriot of the George Washington Chapter of the Virginia Society of the Sons of the American Revolution based on the service of his ancestor, Johannes Kroesen, who served as a second lieutenant in the Bucks County Pennsylvania Militia during the Revolutionary War. Kroesen also served on the board of advisors for the Center for Military Readiness.

Kroesen died in Alexandria, Virginia, on 30 April 2020, at the age of 97 after a long illness. He was buried in Arlington National Cemetery.

== Military education ==
- Infantry Officer Candidate School, Fort Benning, Georgia, 1944
- Command and General Staff College, Fort Leavenworth, Kansas, 1956
- Armed Forces Staff College, Norfolk, Virginia, 1959
- United States Army War College, Carlisle Barracks, Pennsylvania, 1962

== Senior assignments ==
- Commanding officer, 196th Light Infantry Brigade (1968–1969)
- Adviser to the assistant chief of staff (J3), Military Assistance Command, Vietnam (1969–1970)
- Assistant chief of staff (J3), Military Assistance Command, Vietnam (1970–1971)
- Commanding general, 23rd Infantry Division (1971)
- Commanding general, First Regional Assistance Command (1971–1972)
- Deputy gommander, XXIV Corps (1972)
- Commanding general, 82nd Airborne Division (1972–1974)
- Deputy commanding general, V Corps (1974–1975)
- Commanding general, VII Corps (1975–1976)
- Commanding general, United States Army Forces Command (1976–1978)
- Vice Chief of Staff of the United States Army (1978–1979)
- Commanding general, Seventh United States Army, United States Army Europe and NATO Central Army Group (1979–1983)

== Awards and decorations ==
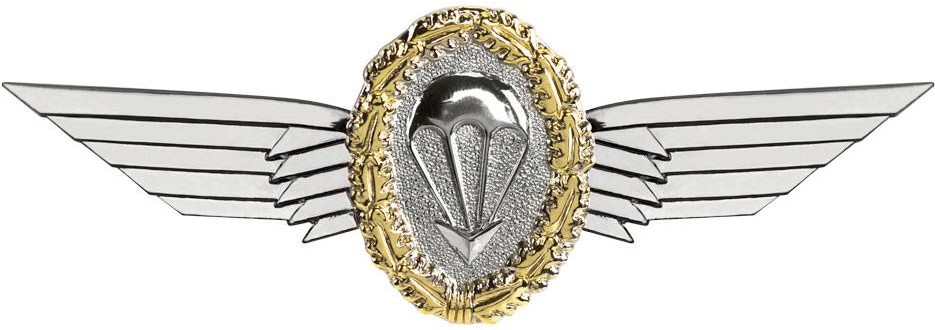
Combat Infantryman Badge, third award
Master Parachutist Badge
Silver German Parachutist Badge
Army Staff Identification Badge
Office of the Joint Chiefs of Staff Identification Badge

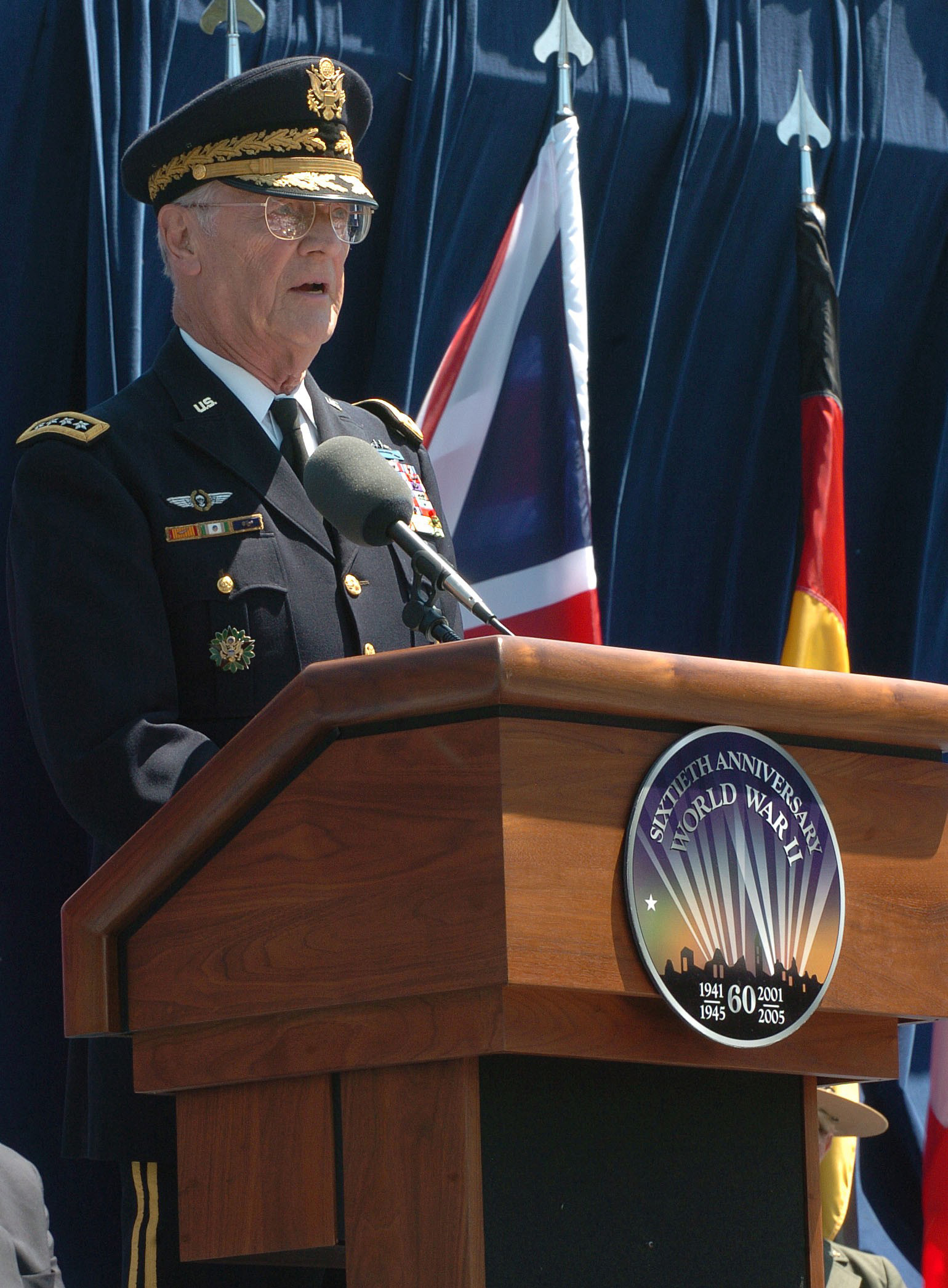
Kroesen in 2005

Defense Distinguished Service Medal
Army Distinguished Service Medal
Silver Star with one oak leaf cluster
Legion of Merit, with two oak leaf clusters
Distinguished Flying Cross
Bronze Star, with v device & two oak leaf clusters
Air Medal, with bronze award numeral 29
Army Commendation Medal, with two oak leaf clusters
Purple Heart, with one oak leaf cluster
Army Presidential Unit Citation, with two oak leaf clusters
Army Good Conduct Medal
American Campaign Medal
European-African-Middle Eastern Campaign Medal, with three service stars
World War II Victory Medal
Army of Occupation Medal
National Defense Service Medal with oak leaf cluster
Korean Service Medal, with one service star
Vietnam Service Medal, with eight service stars
Army Service Ribbon
Army Overseas Service Ribbon, with award numeral 3
French Legion of Honour (Officer)
National Order of Vietnam (Officer)
National Order of Vietnam (Knight)
Vietnam Military Merit Medal
Vietnam Army Distinguished Service Order, 1st Class
Vietnam Gallantry Cross with palm (four awards)
Order of Merit of the Federal Republic of Germany (Knight Commander's Cross)
Korean Presidential Unit Citation
Vietnam Gallantry Cross Unit Citation
United Nations Korea Medal
Vietnam Campaign Medal
Korean War Service Medal

=== Other honors ===
- Association of the United States Army Abrams Award, 2005
- West Point Association of Graduates Sylvanus Thayer Award, 2007
- American Veterans Center Audie Murphy Award, 2013
- Sons of the American Revolution Gold Good Citizenship Medal, 2013
- Honorary Sergeant Major of the Army, 2017
- Namesake of the American Security Council Foundation General Frederick Kroesen Leadership Award
- Chairman Emeritus of the board of MPRI
- Life Member Emeritus, United States Army Officer Candidate School Alumni Association

== Works ==
- General Thoughts: Seventy Years with the Army. Publisher: Institute of Land Warfare, Association of the United States Army, 2003

Military offices
Preceded by Walter T. Kerwin, Jr.	Vice Chief of Staff of the United States Army; 1978–1979	Succeeded by John William Vessey, Jr.
Preceded by George S. Blanchard	Commanding General of United States Army Europe; 1979–1983	Succeeded by Glenn K. Otis
