= Arthur K. Cebrowski =

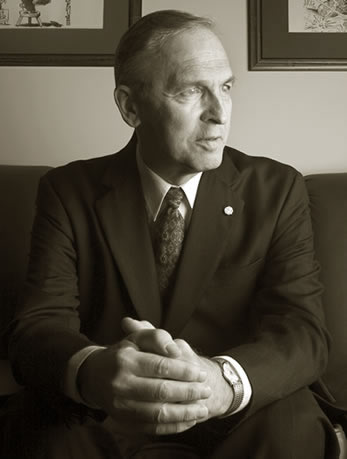
- Arthur K. Cebrowski, Director of the Office of Force Transformation
- Born: August 13, 1942; Passaic, New Jersey, U.S.
- Died: November 12, 2005 (aged 63)
- Burial place: Arlington National Cemetery
- Military career
- Allegiance: United States of America
- Branch: United States Navy
- Service years: 1964–2001
- Rank: Vice Admiral
- Commands: President, Naval War College; USS Guam; USS Midway
- Conflicts: Vietnam War; Operation Desert Storm

Vice Admiral (ret.) Arthur Karl Cebrowski (August 13, 1942 – November 12, 2005) was a United States Navy admiral. He also who served from October 2001 to January 2005 as Director of the Office of Force Transformation in the U.S. Department of Defense. In this position, he was responsible for serving as an advocate, focal point, and catalyst for the transformation of the United States military.

== Early life and naval career ==
Cebrowski was born in Passaic, New Jersey to a Polish American family. He was a 1964 graduate of Villanova University, held a master's degree in computer systems management from the Naval Postgraduate School and attended the Naval War College.

He entered the navy through the Reserve Officers Training Corps in 1964.

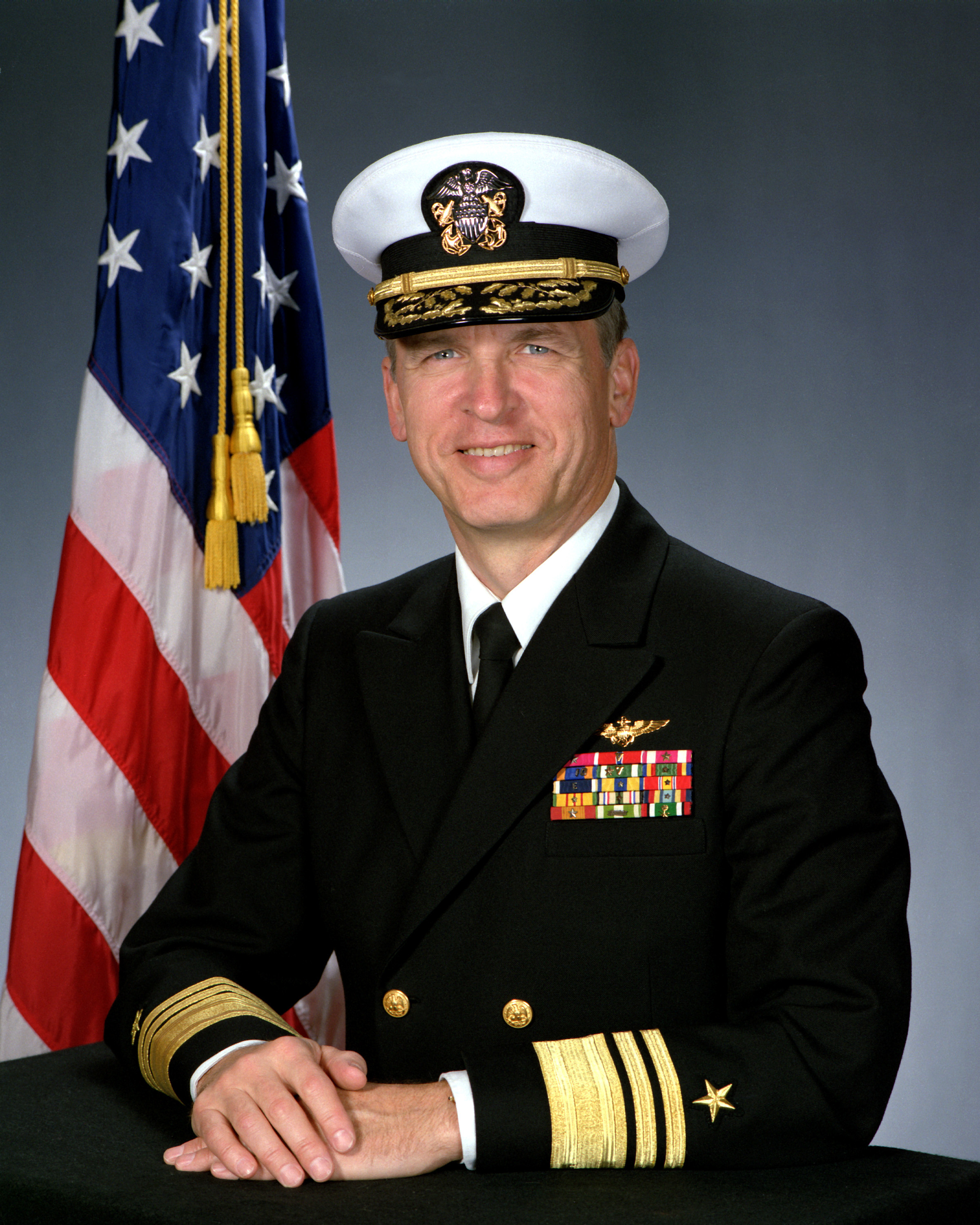
Vice Adm. Cebrowski in 1994

Cebrowski was a naval aviator and commanded Fighter Squadron 41 (VF-41) and Carrier Air Wing 8. He commanded the assault ship USS Guam, the aircraft carrier USS Midway, and, as a Rear Admiral (Lower Half) in December 1993, Carrier Group 6, whose flagship was the USS America (CV-66).

He had combat experience in Vietnam and during Desert Storm. His joint assignments included service as the Director, Command, Control, Communications and Computers (J-6), Joint Staff.

In October 1993, after several weeks supporting United Nations peacekeeping efforts in Bosnia, orders came on four hours notice for Carrier Group Six, under Rear Admiral (lower half) Arthur Cebrowski, to move quickly. The group was to transit the Suez Canal and relieve USS Abraham Lincoln (CVN-72) on Groundhog Station, 90 miles north of the equator in the Indian Ocean, supporting UNOSOM II in Somalia. The flagship USS America (CV-66) transited the Suez Canal on 29 October 1993. She was followed, on 1 November, by members of her battle group, USS Simpson (FFG-56) and the replenished oiler USS Savannah (AOR-4). The transit took America over 2,500 miles in a week. The turnover from Abraham Lincoln permitted the west-coast carrier to return to Alameda, California, thereby ending a scheduled six-month deployment on time. Upon arrival, Rear Adm. Cebrowski, as carrier group commander, took command of Naval Battle Force Somalia (CTF 156). The I Marine Expeditionary Force (I MEF)-led "Unified Task Force" had turned over control a few months before to UNOSOM II. There were Marine forces from I MEF (referred to as MARFOR Somalia) and Army forces from the 10th Mountain Division as well as Air Force and Navy; and personnel and units from other Member States of the United Nations. Other U.S. naval and Marine Corps forces included USS Simpson (FFG-56), USS New Orleans (LPH-11), USS Denver (LPD-9), USS Comstock (LSD-45), USS Cayuga (LST-1186), and the 13th Marine Expeditionary Unit.

Admiral Cebrowski retired from the Navy on October 1, 2001, with over 37 years of service, after serving as the President of the Naval War College in Newport, Rhode Island.

== Office of Force Transformation ==
The Secretary of Defense called for the creation of the Office of Force Transformation in support of President George W. Bush's broad mandate to transform the nation's military capabilities. The transformation was intended to challenge the status quo with new concepts for American defense to ensure an overwhelming and continuing competitive advantage for America's military for decades to come. Cebrowski was appointed by Secretary of Defense Donald Rumsfeld, effective October 29, 2001, reporting directly to the Secretary and Deputy Secretary of Defense.

As Director of Force Transformation, Admiral Cebrowski worked to link transformation to strategic functions, evaluated the transformation efforts of the military departments, and promoted synergy by recommending steps to integrate ongoing transformation activities. Among his primary responsibilities, Admiral Cebrowski monitored service and joint experimentation programs and made policy recommendations to the Secretary and Deputy Secretary of Defense.

Vice Admiral Cebrowski died on November 12, 2005, aged 63. He was buried in Arlington National Cemetery on January 9, 2006.

== See also ==
- Network-centric warfare
- Gray Eagle Award

Military offices
Preceded by James R. Stark	President of the Naval War College; July 24, 1998–August 22, 2001	Succeeded by Rodney P. Rempt
