= Lamar Owens =

American football player and coach (born 1983)

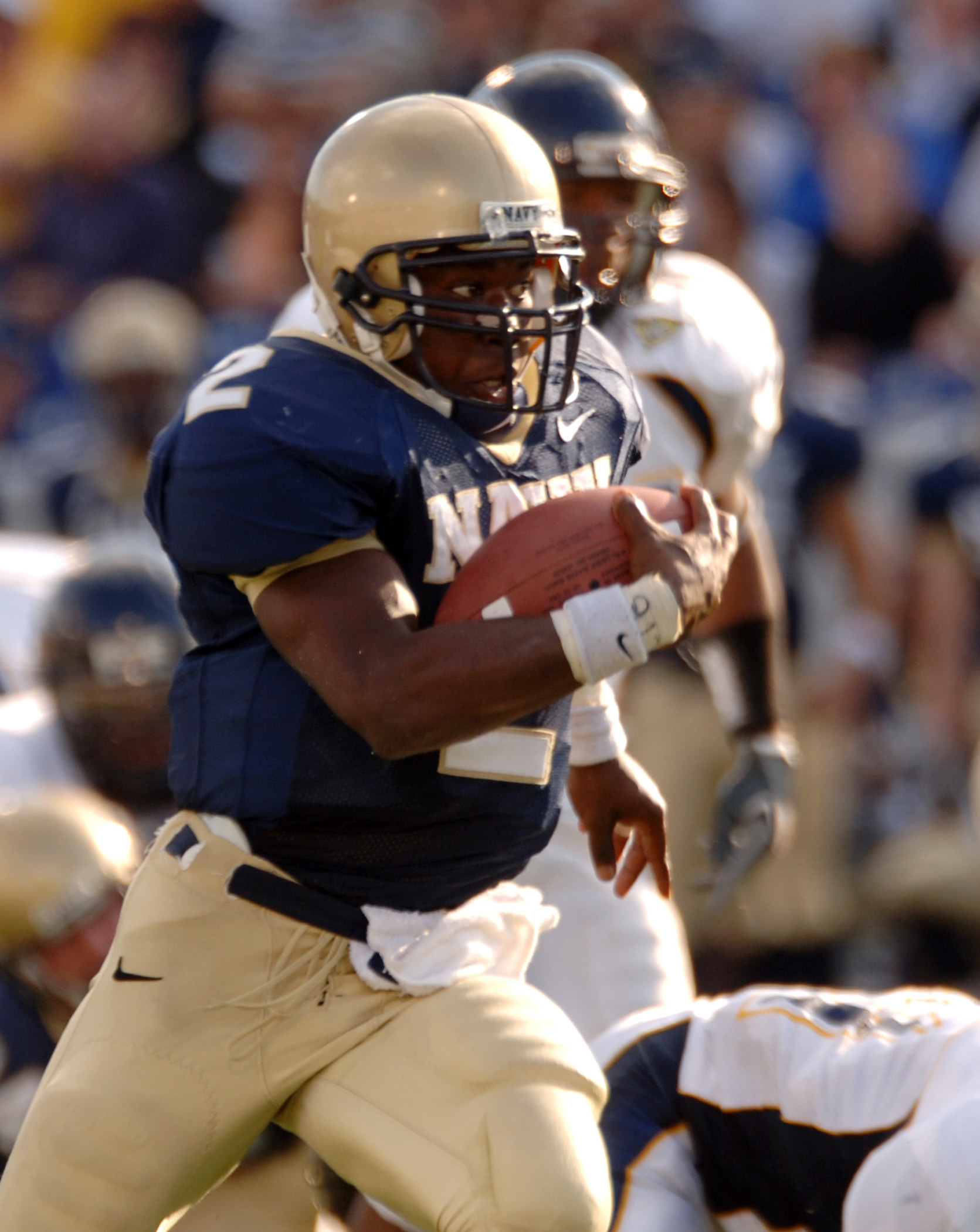
- Owens in 2005

Current position
- Title: Offensive Coordinator
- Team: The Citadel
- Conference: SoCon

Biographical details
- Born: September 6, 1983 (age 43); Savannah, Georgia, US

Playing career
- 2002–2005: Navy
- Position: Quarterback

Coaching career (HC unless noted)
- 2008–2009: Georgia Tech (assistant)
- 2010–2018: Georgia Tech (AB)
- 2016: Georgia Tech (AB/ST)
- 2017–2018: Georgia Tech (AB/ST/RC)
- 2019: Georgia Southern (WR)
- 2023–2023: The Citadel (CB)
- 2024: The Citadel (co-OC/WR)
- 2025–present: The Citadel (OC/WR)

Lamar S. Owens Jr. (born September 6, 1983) is an American football coach and former midshipman who was the starting quarterback at the United States Naval Academy. He is the current offensive coordinator for The Citadel. He formerly coached at Georgia Tech and Georgia Southern. Owens grew up in Savannah, Georgia, and attended Benedictine Military School, a parochial all-male academy for grades 9-12.

Lamar Owens was a 22-year-old senior at the United States Naval Academy while charged under the Uniform Code of Military Justice (UCMJ) with raping a fellow female midshipman within the school's dormitory (Bancroft Hall) on January 29th 2006. The trial took place in a Military General Court Martial at the Washington Navy Yard in July 2006. A jury panel composed of five active-duty naval officers, all whom were stationed aboard the U.S. Naval Academy, found MIDN 1/C Lamar Owens not guilty of rape, but guilty of conduct unbecoming an officer and violating a direct order.

== United States v. MIDN First Class Lamar S. Owens Jr., USN ==
Presiding military judge Commander John A. Maksym found an appearance of unlawful command influence based on emails sent by the superintendent of the Naval Academy, Vice-Admiral Rodney P. Rempt. This granted MIDN 1/C Owens' defense counsel additional peremptory challenges during jury selection.

The prosecution's case was deficient in probative evidence required to sustain the allegation. It was the digital forensic evidence that materially contributed to the acquittal on the charge of rape. Prior to trial, the Government's case rested almost exclusively upon the uncorroborated testimony of the female midshipman. Shortly after the allegation was reported, the Naval Criminal Investigative Service (NCIS) seized the computers and additional electronic devices belonging to both parties. Upon completion of its forensic examination, NCIS determined that material elements of the accuser’s account were contradicted by the recovered digital evidence — specifically, her reconstructed timeline of events, her characterization of the accused as only a mere acquaintance, and most importantly, her assertion that he had entered her room without invitation. The exculpatory value derived principally from records of the America Online Instant Messenger (AIM) platform, the contents of which impeached and effectively contradicted the accuser’s corroborating account.

Amid accusations of bias, Vice-Admiral Rodney P. Rempt recused himself from further consideration of the legal case, and the post-trial review was passed to Vice Admiral Paul E. Sullivan, commander of Naval Sea Systems Command. On January 19, 2007, Vice Admiral Paul E. Sullivan, affirmed the jury's decision to clear Owens of raping a female midshipman and impose no punishment for convictions of conduct unbecoming an officer and violating a military protective order.

The court martial convicted Owens of two violations of the UCMJ, but sentenced him to "no punishment". He was not allowed to graduate, a decision that stirred significant controversy.

The decision on Owens's future in the naval service was handled administratively. Owens appealed to Secretary of the Navy Donald C. Winter, and hundreds of alumni—including Heisman Trophy winners Roger Staubach and Joe Bellino— all who wrote letters in support of Owens graduating and to commission as an officer in the U.S. Navy. Secretary Donald C. Winter ruled his conduct "unsatisfactory" and ordered Owens to be discharged. On April 12, 2007, Owens was expelled. His education was valued at close to $136,000, but his debt was reduced to approximately $91,000 "in recognition of his noteworthy professional conduct" from the time the allegation was made until his expulsion, the Navy stated in a written statement.

== Asymmetry of outcome ==
Owens was acquitted of the only serious charge while sentenced to “no punishment” by the panel. Owens lost his degree, his commission, and roughly $90K through an administrative channel the court-martial did not control. There was legitimate criticism that the punitive result was reimposed through a “side door” after the criminal process declined to punish Owens, driven substantially by the “sex in Bancroft” conduct violation that would rarely end a potential career so totally.

Owens’ attorney, Reid Weingarten, stated that the accuser and other midshipmen who had violated academy rules faced no comparable consequences and were proceeding to graduation.

Heavy criticism of Owens’ post-trial administrative treatment was further escalated when Vice-Admiral Rodney P. Rempt referenced Owens’ two other court-martial convictions along with demerits accumulated at the academy, a poor military aptitude score in his final semester, and the allegation of stored pornography on his computer as justifiable reasons to recommend Owens’ expulsion and administrative separation Critics accused Vice-Admiral Rodney P. Rempt of succumbing to civilian (and military) political pressure. Many blamed Vice-Admiral Rodney P. Rempt in taking an outwardly obtuse position in Owens’ post-trial treatment. A former graduate and Marine Corps officer close to the matter, while choosing to remain anonymous said: “so now he gets kicked out because he had sex in a no-sex area? Because he had too many accumulated demerits? I used to have more demerits than him. Because his military aptitude was low? Whose aptitude would be high while undergoing a career implicating criminal investigation with a looming court martial? Because porn was on his computer? I suppose Admiral Rempt has never seen a playboy magazine and surely, no one else at the academy has porn on their computer, right?"

== Coaching career ==
In 2010, Owens became an assistant coach at Georgia Tech under head coach Paul Johnson. During his time at Georgia Tech, Owens served as the Community Service Director for the football team. In 2009 and 2010, Owens hosted summer camps in his hometown of Savannah. For the past three years he has hosted a one-day summer camp, named Fundamentals on the Field on Georgia Tech's campus in partnership with the Chick-fil-A Foundation and Fellowship of Christian Athletes.

Owens also earned a Lean Six Sigma Black Belt from Scheller School of Business at Georgia Tech in August 2014. He has applied six sigma methodologies in every aspect of his coaching duties.

On February 19, 2016, Owens began attending the NCAA and NFL Coaches Academy in Tampa, FL.

In 2019, Owens became the wide receivers coach at Georgia Southern. In December, Owens resigned his post as wide receivers coach at Georgia Southern.

In 2023, Owens became the cornerbacks coach for The Citadel.

In 2024, Owens was promoted to and is the current Offensive Coordinator for The Citadel.
