= Joseph C. Strasser =

United States Navy admiral (1940–2019)

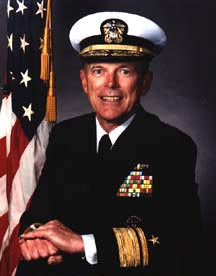
- Born: September 3, 1940; Camden, New Jersey, U.S.
- Died: June 21, 2019 (aged 79); Voorhees, New Jersey, U.S.
- Military career
- Allegiance: United States of America
- Branch: United States Navy
- Service years: 1963-1995
- Rank: Rear Admiral
- Commands: USS O'Callahan (FF-1051); Destroyer Squadron 35; Cruiser-Destroyer Group 3; USS Enterprise (CVN-65) Carrier Battle Group; President of the Naval War College
- Conflicts: Cold War
- Awards: Defense Distinguished Service Medal; Distinguished Service Medal; Defense Superior Service Medal; Legion of Merit (three awards); Meritorious Service Medal (two awards)
- Other work: Dean, Pennsylvania State University Commonwealth Campus; Director, USAA; Executive Director, Naval War College Foundation

Joseph Charles Strasser (3 September 1940 - 21 June 2019) was a rear admiral of the United States Navy. His career included service in destroyers during the Cold War, two tours as executive assistant to senior military leaders, and a tour as President of the Naval War College.

== Naval career ==
Strasser was born on 3 September 1940 in Camden, New Jersey, the son of Edward J. Strasser and the former Mary Blake, and raised in Collingswood, New Jersey. He graduated in 1958 from Camden Catholic High School in Cherry Hill, New Jersey. He attended La Salle College in Philadelphia, from 1958 to 1959, then entered the United States Naval Academy in 1959, graduating in June 1963. In 1962, he was an exchange officer aboard the Argentine Navy training ship Libertad, a tall ship, and was aboard her on her maiden voyage, during which she visited four continents.

Strasser served aboard the destroyer USS Buck (DD-761) from 1964 to 1966. He later attended the Fletcher School of Law and Diplomacy at Tufts University, from which he received a master's degree in international relations in 1969, a master's degree in international law and diplomacy in 1970, and a doctorate in political science in 1971. He then attended the Naval War College in Newport, Rhode Island, graduating with distinction in 1972.

During his career, Strasser was commanding officer of the frigate USS O'Callahan (FF-1051) from 11 October 1977 to 19 October 1979, and later of Destroyer Squadron 35, Cruiser-Destroyer Group 3, and the USS Enterprise (CVN-65) Carrier Battle Group.

Strasser also was a battalion officer at the U.S. Naval Academy, later served two tours on the staff of the Chief of Naval Operations in the Strategy, Plans, and Policy Division, and was executive assistant to the Commander-in-Chief, United States Pacific Command, and executive assistant to the Chairman of the Joint Chiefs of Staff, Admiral William J. Crowe, traveling around much of the world with Crowe during the assignment.

Strasser's penultimate tour was as Commander of Cruiser-Destroyer Group 3, embarked aboard the guided-missile cruiser USS Valley Forge (CG-50). Relieved of this command on 6 July 1990, he moved on to become the 46th President of the Naval War College from 17 July 1990 to 29 June 1995. During his five-year presidency; the longest in the college's history; he oversaw the college's transition from the Cold War era as the Warsaw Pact and Soviet Union collapsed, achieved accreditation of the college by the New England Association of Schools and Colleges to grant a master's degree in National Security and Strategic Studies, acquired approval of the United States Congress for the construction of the college's Strategic Maritime Research Center, McCarty-Little Hall, and inaugurated combined Russia-United Kingdom-United States (RUKUS) wargames.

Upon the conclusion of his college presidency, Strasser retired from the Navy after 32 years of service.

== Retirement ==
In retirement, Strasser was on the staff of Pennsylvania State University from 1995 to 2000, first as campus executive officer at the Penn State DuBois campus at DuBois, Pennsylvania, from 1995 to 1997 and then as the first dean of the university's Commonwealth College, the university's largest college. He then was the Executive Director of the Naval War College Foundation in Newport, Rhode Island, from 2000 to 2006. He was a director of Sturm, Ruger and Company, Inc., from August 2005 to February 2006, and from 1998 through at least 2010 served on the board of directors of USAA.

== Personal life ==
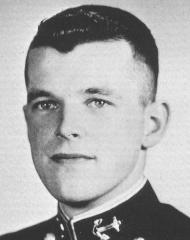
Strasser as a United States Naval Academy midshipman, ca. 1963.

Strasser was married to the former Barbara Wagner. He was inducted into the Camden Catholic High School Hall of Fame in 2009 for achievement in academics. A resident of the Marlton section of Evesham Township, New Jersey, he died on 21 June 2019 in Voorhees Township, New Jersey.

Military offices
Preceded by Ronald J. Kurth	President of the Naval War College; 17 July 1990–29 June 1995	Succeeded by James R. Stark
