= USS North Dakota (SSN-784) =

US Navy Virginia-class submarine

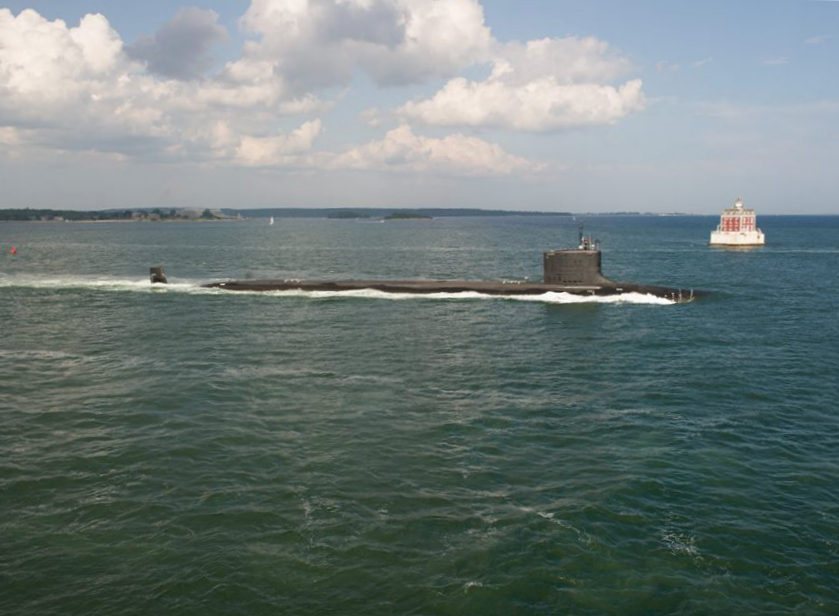
- North Dakota during trials in August 2014

History

United States
- Name: USS North Dakota
- Namesake: The U.S. state of North Dakota
- Awarded: 14 August 2003
- Builder: General Dynamics Electric Boat
- Laid down: 11 May 2012
- Launched: 15 September 2013
- Sponsored by: Katie Fowler
- Christened: 2 November 2013
- Commissioned: 25 October 2014
- Home port: Naval Submarine Base New London
- Motto: Strength from the Soil, Reapers of the Deep
- Status: in active service
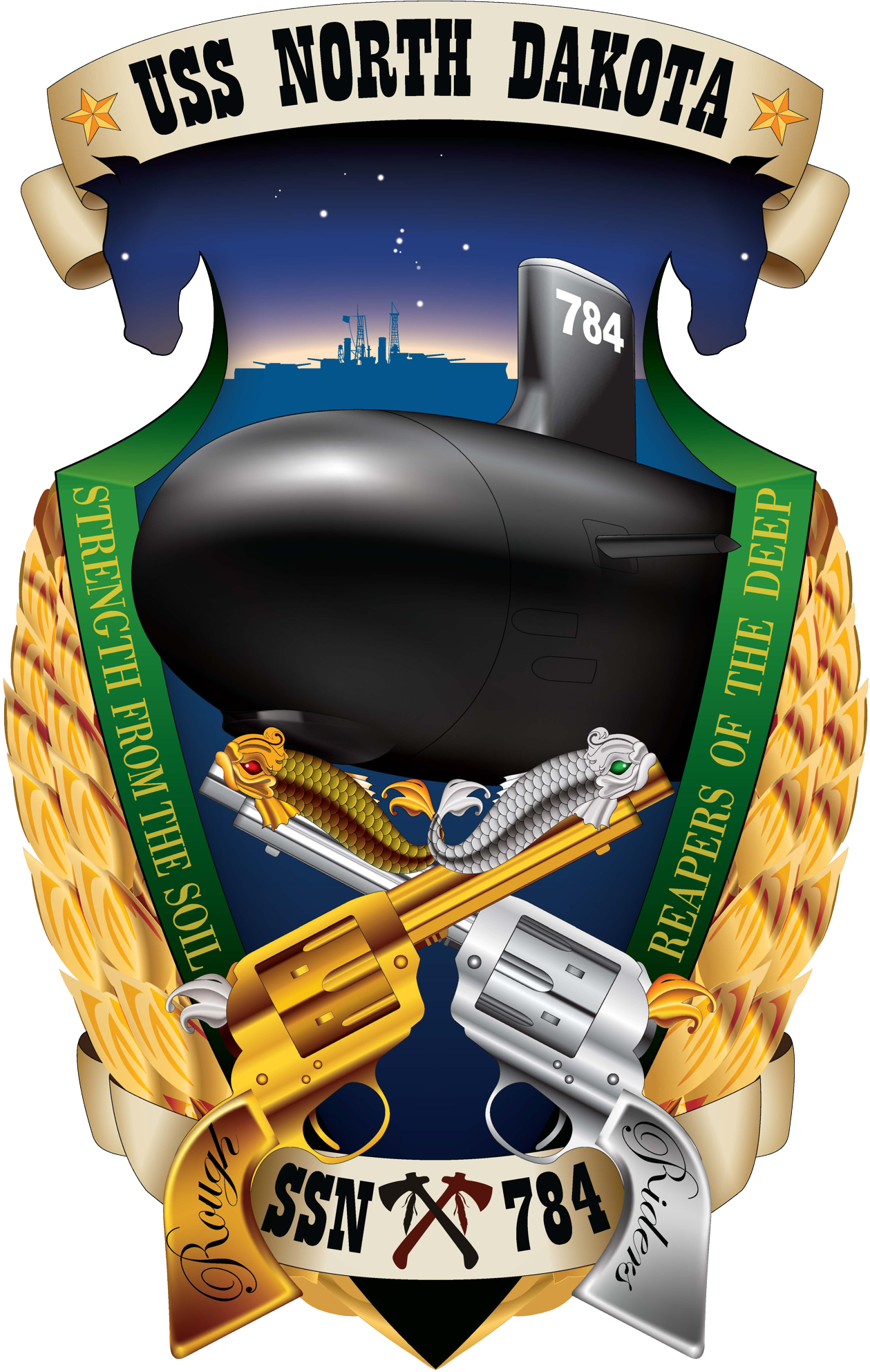
- Badge

General characteristics
- Class & type: Virginia-class submarine
- Displacement: 7800 tons light, 7800 tons full
- Length: 114.9 m (377 ft)
- Beam: 10.3 m (34 ft)
- Propulsion: 1 × S9G PWR nuclear reactor 280,000 shp (210 MW), HEU 93%; 2 × steam turbines 40,000 shp (30 MW); 1 × single shaft pump-jet propulsor; 1 × secondary propulsion motor
- Speed: 25 knots (46 km/h; 29 mph)
- Range: Essentially unlimited distance; 33 years
- Test depth: greater than 800 ft (240 m)
- Complement: 134 officers and men

USS North Dakota (SSN-784) is a Virginia-class nuclear powered attack submarine of the United States Navy. She is the second U.S. Navy vessel to be named for the U.S. state of North Dakota, the first being World War I-era battleship USS North Dakota (BB-29).

== History ==
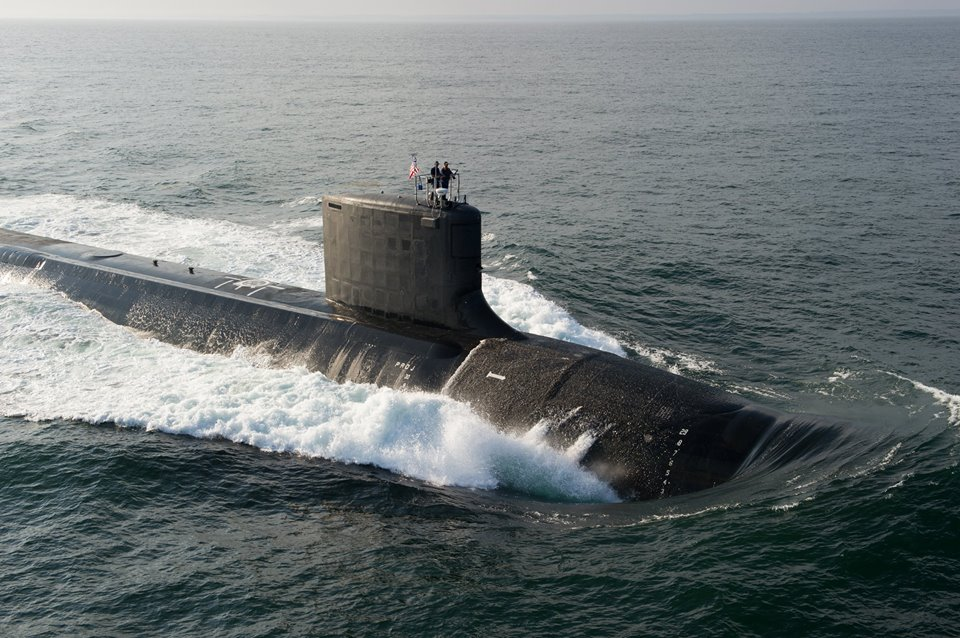
Officers survey the horizon as North Dakota sails along the surface, just after her delivery in August 2014

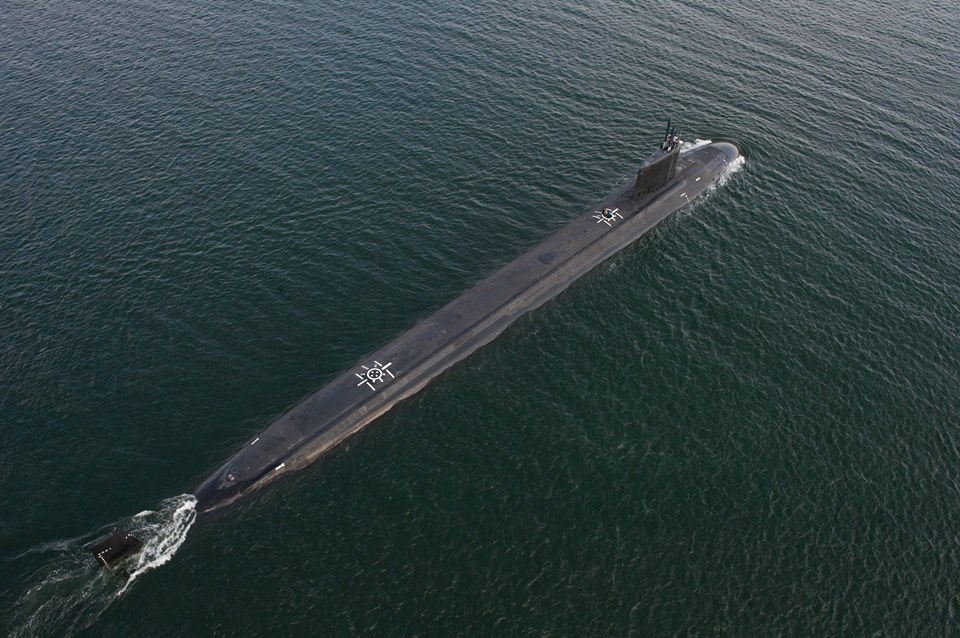
Overhead view of North Dakota cruising in calm waters

The contract to build SSN-784 was awarded to the Electric Boat division of General Dynamics in Groton, Connecticut, on 14 August 2003. Her name was announced on 15 July 2008, and her keel was laid down on 11 May 2012. She was floated on 15 September 2013 and was christened on 2 November 2013, sponsored by Katie Fowler, wife of Vice Admiral Jeff Fowler.

North Dakota became the first of eight Virginia-class Block III boats. Approximately 20 percent of North Dakota was redesigned to lower acquisition cost and increase operational flexibility. The changes include a boat's bow redesign, replacing 12 individual launch tubes with two large-diameter Virginia Payload Tubes, each capable of launching six UGM-109 Tomahawk cruise missiles.

=== Build issues ===
The United States Navy accepted delivery of North Dakota on 29 August 2014, two days prior to her contract delivery date. The submarine successfully completed Alpha, Bravo, and Board of Inspection and Survey (INSURV) trials, which evaluate the submarine's seaworthiness and operational capabilities. During the trials, the crew took the submarine to test depth, conducted an emergency surfacing, and tested the submarine's propulsion plant.

The Navy postponed North Dakota's original commissioning date of May 2014 because of quality issues with vendor-assembled and delivered components that required an unplanned dry-docking to correct. Additional design certification work was also required on the submarine's redesigned bow. North Dakota was commissioned on 25 October 2014 in Groton.

=== Notable incidents ===
In January 2018, North Dakota experienced a medical emergency while at sea, when a petty officer attempted suicide using his service rifle to shoot himself in the chest. The boat dashed for port through rough weather and, by necessity, on the surface so medical advice to the corpsman could be given over communications channels. She met a tug near the mouth of the Thames River in New London, Connecticut, to transfer the injured sailor to hospital. He survived the attempt and was last reported to be improving.

=== Overhaul (2023–2026) ===
North Dakota arrived at Portsmouth Naval Shipyard in Kittery, Maine, in April 2023 for "system upgrades and other maintenance" that were expected to take approximately 33 months. The work was completed in February 2026, some 34 months later.

== Ship's crest ==
The ship's crest was launched on 24 August 2012 by Lt. Gov. Drew Wrigley in the Great Hall at the North Dakota State Capitol. The final crest is the culmination of a design process that started with entries submitted by the boat's crew and North Dakota residents and ended with an impressive and extremely symbolic icon.

North Dakota displays the boat's motto, "Strength from the Soil, Reapers of the Deep." "Strength from the soil" is taken from the state coat of arms of North Dakota and the Governor's Flag representing the connection between North Dakota and the State of North Dakota. "Reapers of the Deep" has a double meaning. It represents both the fighting spirit of the submarine warrior and the ties to the state's farm heritage of reapers, who cut grain in the fields. The green ribbon on which the motto resides represents the agricultural community as well as the colors of the University of North Dakota and North Dakota State University.

The overall shape of the crest is that of an Indian arrowhead, similar to that used on the coat of arms of North Dakota. This represents the American Indian heritage of North Dakota. Flanking the Indian arrowhead shape and acting as its serrated cutting edge is wheat. This represents the North Dakota farming community. Prominently displayed on the crest are gold and silver six-shooter revolvers. The front sights of the revolvers are formed by the gold and silver dolphins, representing the officer and enlisted submarine warfare community. Additionally, the revolvers represent the two UGM-109 Tomahawk payload tubes the boat carries in arsenal. The red and green eyes of the submarine dolphins mounted on the six-shooter revolvers pays tribute to the port and starboard running lights of the professional mariner. Across the revolver hand grips are the words "Rough Riders." This is a salute to the state's connection to President Theodore Roosevelt. The Rough Riders were volunteers from the plains during the Spanish–American War. Members of the North Dakota National Guard as well as Roosevelt's Rough Riders served in combat for one year in the Philippines, supporting its occupation following the Spanish–American War. Across the skyline is the silhouette of the first USS North Dakota (BB-29). BB-29 is additionally represented as one of the two gold stars flanking the words, "USS NORTH DAKOTA." SSN-784, the second warship to bear the name, represents the second gold star in this banner. At the base of the arrowhead outline are two horse heads, representing the Nokota horses that roamed the prairies of North Dakota. In the night sky is the constellation Orion. Orion, the hunter, signifies the warrior heart of the people of North Dakota and the war fighting crew of North Dakota. Wrapping across the crest is a banner with two Native American tomahawks, representing the state's Native American Indian heritage and Tomahawk cruise missiles, one of the weapons capabilities North Dakota can employ. Finally, prominently pushing through the ship's crest is a Virginia-Class submarine representing the sailors who operate this warship.
