= Claudius E. Watts III =

American lieutenant general (1936–2023)

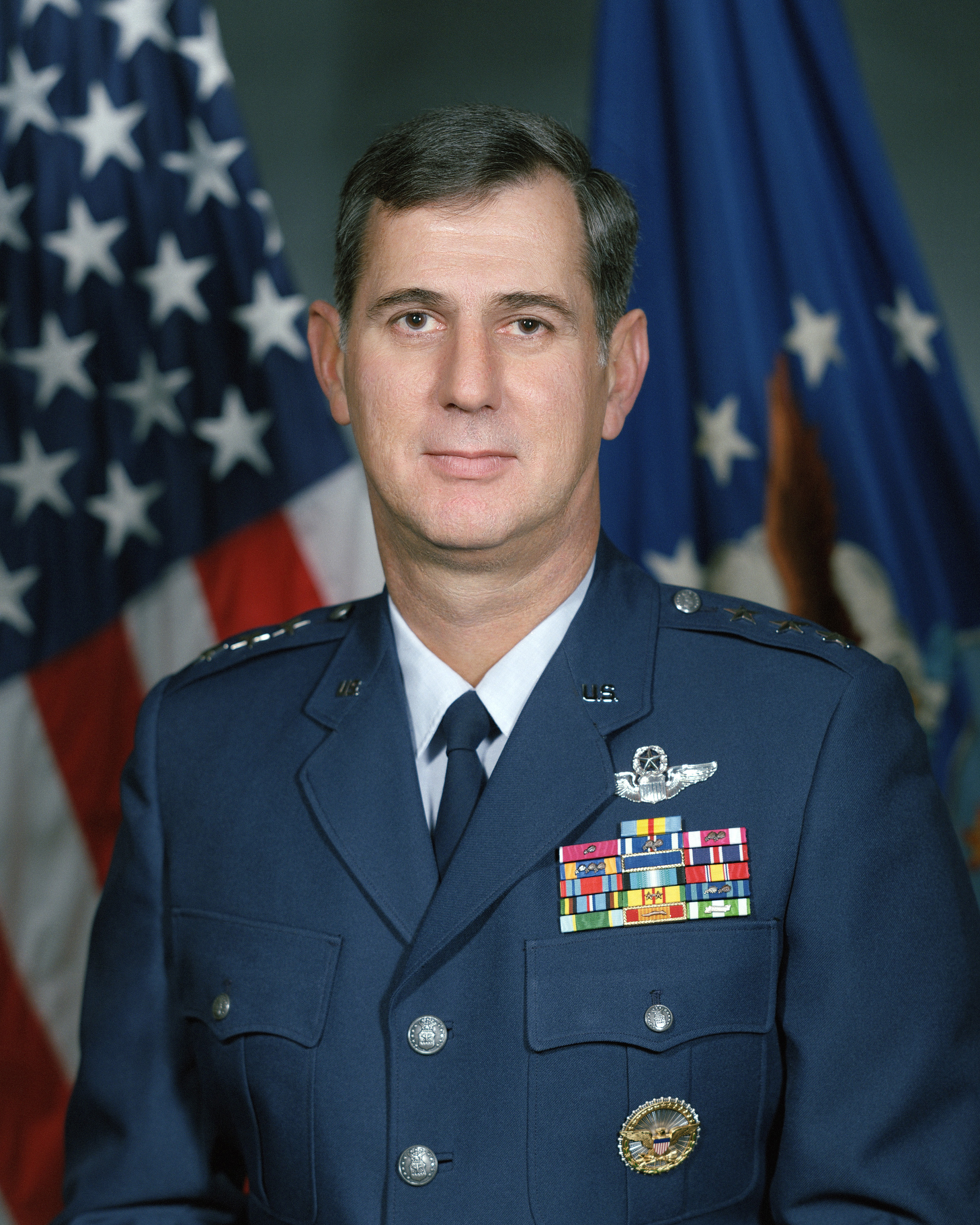
- Watts in 1986
- Born: September 22, 1936; Bennettsville, South Carolina, U.S.
- Died: October 1, 2023 (aged 87); South Carolina, U.S.
- Burial place: Arlington National Cemetery
- Military career
- Allegiance: United States
- Branch: United States Air Force
- Service years: 1958–1989
- Rank: Lieutenant general
- Commands: 63d Military Airlift Wing; 438th Military Airlift Group

Claudius Elmer "Bud" Watts III (September 22, 1936 – October 1, 2023) was a United States Air Force lieutenant general and past president of The Citadel having served from 1989 to 1996. Watts Barracks is named in his honor.

== Biography ==
Born in Bennettsville, South Carolina, he graduated from The Citadel in 1958, and attended the London School of Economics and Political Science as a Fulbright scholar. He later earned an MBA from the Stanford University Graduate School of Business in 1967. He completed Squadron Officer School in 1962, Army Command and General Staff College in 1972, and National War College in 1978. He also completed the program for senior managers in government at Harvard University in 1983.

After completing undergraduate pilot training, he flew the C-124 Globemaster with the 17th Air Transport Squadron at Charleston AFB, South Carolina and saw combat in Vietnam with the 12th Special Operations Squadron. He later served as chief of operations and training for the 1402d Military Airlift Squadron at Andrews AFB, Maryland and commanded both the 438th Military Airlift Group at McGuire AFB, New Jersey and the 63d Military Airlift Wing at Norton AFB, California. His staff tours included tactical intelligence officer and division chief at Headquarters Tactical Air Command; Directorate of Doctrine and Concepts on the Air Staff at the Pentagon; deputy chief of staff for plans at Headquarters Military Airlift Command at Scott AFB, Illinois; director of budget at Air Force Headquarters and senior military assistant to the Deputy Secretary of Defense. He was named Comptroller of the Air Force in 1986 and retired in June, 1989.

Watts sat on the board of the Center for Military Readiness. as well as the board of the Ranch Hand Association.

Watts died in South Carolina on October 1, 2023, at the age of 87.
