= James R. Stark =

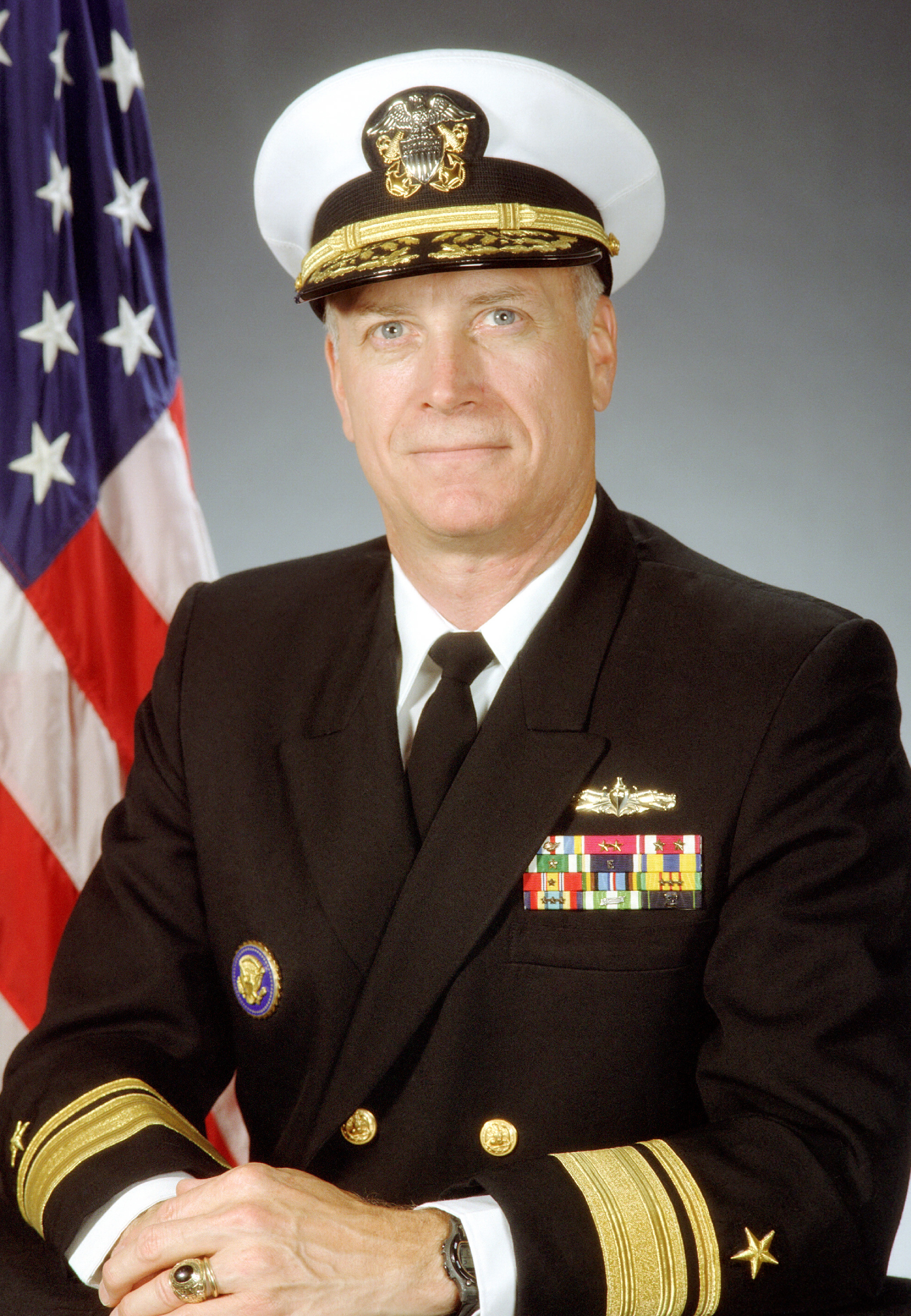
- Born: May 27, 1943 (age 83); Arlington, Virginia, U.S.
- Military career
- Allegiance: United States of America
- Branch: United States Navy
- Service years: 1965-1998
- Rank: Rear Admiral
- Nickname: "Jim"
- Commands: USS Julius A. Furer (FFG-6); USS Leahy (CG-16); Standing Naval Force Atlantic; United States Pacific Fleet Training Command; President of the Naval War College
- Conflicts: Cold War; Vietnam War; Yugoslav Wars
- Awards: Defense Superior Service Medal; Legion of Merit (three awards); Meritorious Service Medal (three awards); Navy Commendation Medal (two awards)
- Other work: Northrop Grumman Electronic Systems; The Spectrum Group; CNA Financial Corporation.

James R. Stark (born May 27, 1943) is a retired rear admiral of the United States Navy who served during the Cold War and in the Vietnam War and oversaw operations related to the Yugoslav Wars of the 1990s. A surface warfare officer, his career included command of ships at sea, senior U.S. Navy and North Atlantic Treaty Organization (NATO) commands, staff assignments with the Chief of Naval Operations and the National Security Council, and a tour as President of the Naval War College.

== Naval career ==
Stark was born in Arlington, Virginia. He graduated with distinction from the United States Naval Academy in 1965 with a Bachelor of Science degree. His initial tour was a short one aboard the destroyer USS Brownson (DD-868), after which he attended the University of Vienna in Vienna, Austria, for one year as a Fulbright Scholar from 1965 to 1966.

After returning to the United States, Stark went back to sea, serving as Combat Information Center officer aboard the destroyer leader USS Wilkinson (DL-5). He then was weapons officer first aboard the destroyer USS Jenkins (DD-447) and then aboard the destroyer USS Higbee (DD-806) and deployed to Southeast Asia aboard both ships for service in the Vietnam War.

In 1970, Stark began graduate studies at the Fletcher School of Law and Diplomacy at Tufts University, from which he received two master's degrees and a doctorate in political science in 1973. He then returned to sea duty as executive officer of the destroyer USS Myles C. Fox (DD-829), followed by a tour as executive officer of the guided-missile cruiser USS Richmond K. Turner (CG-20). He was commanding officer of the guided-missile frigate USS Julius A. Furer (FFG-6) from 1981 to 1983 and of the guided-missile cruiser USS Leahy (CG-16) from 18 July 1987 to 31 October 1989.

In Washington, D.C., Stark had assignments on the Navy Staff, on the National Security Council staff, and as executive director of the Chief of Naval Operations Executive Panel. He was selected in December 1991 for promotion to rear admiral (lower half), and was commander of the United States Pacific Fleet Training Command from June 1992 to March 1994. He assumed command of the North Atlantic Treaty Organization's Standing Naval Force Atlantic on 14 April 1994, and during that tour directed its operations in support of the United Nations embargo of Serbia and Bosnia and Herzegovina during the Yugoslav Wars. He was selected for promotion to rear admiral in December 1994.

On 29 June 1995, Stark became the 47th President of the Naval War College in Newport, Rhode Island. During his presidency, he reorganized the curriculum of the College of Continuing Education to allow officers to complete the course in a single shore tour, oversaw the construction of McCarty-Little Hall, began the college's planning for a new library and administration building, and incorporated the Naval Warfare Development Center into the college's operations. Stark retired from the Navy after 33 years of service upon the conclusion of his college presidency on 24 July 1998.

== Decorations and awards ==
During his career, Stark received the Defense Superior Service Medal, three awards of the Legion of Merit, three awards of the Meritorious Service Medal, and two awards of the Navy Commendation Medal, as well as various campaign and service awards.

== Personal life ==
Stark is married to the former Roswitha Stari. They have a son and a daughter.

== Retirement ==
In retirement, Stark worked in London, England, for Northrop Grumman Electronic Systems for nearly seven years as vice president for European Marketing. He then became an independent consultant as a member of The Spectrum Group. He also has served as a senior advisor to the CNA Financial Corporation.

== Awards ==
- Defense Superior Service Medal
- Legion of Merit (three awards)
- Meritorious Service Medal (three awards)
- Navy Commendation Medal (two awards)

Military offices
Preceded by Joseph C. Strasser	President of the Naval War College; 29 June 1995–24 July 1998	Succeeded by Arthur K. Cebrowski
