= Gender norming =

Gender norming is the practice of adjusting physical tests for men and women to in a way that ensures that they have roughly equal pass-rates for each gender. The objective is to ensure that positions are filled with a balance of both genders, and it requires that women be given less physically challenging tests than men in order to attain the same fitness rating. The US Army adopted gender norming at West Point, calling it a system of "equivalent training".

In Bauer v. Lynch (Decided: January 11, 2016), the United States Court of Appeals for the Fourth Circuit has found that gender norming is permissible under Title VII of the Civil Rights Act of 1964, which covers employment discrimination.

== Opposition ==
David Brinkley, deputy chief of staff for operations at the United States Army's Training and Doctrine Command, told the AP "the men don't want to lower the standards because they see that as a perceived risk to their team", and "the women don’t want to lower the standards because they want the men to know they're just as able as they are to do the same task." Other opponents include Walter E. Williams, who wrote that "officers who insist that females be held accountable to the same high standards as males are seen by higher brass as obstructionist and risk their careers", and Elaine Donnelly, the founder of the Center for Military Readiness.

== Controversy ==
Some commentators have suggested that the military doesn't really have relaxed standards for women. An article in The Hill asserts that "combat roles are already subject to gender-neutral standards." The website Military.com says: "Gender-neutral standards [were] scrapped -- much to the chagrin of some senior Army officials."

== In popular culture ==
In the movie G.I. Jane, female SEAL candidate Jordan O'Neil receives an extra 30 seconds in an obstacle course and is told, "It's called gender norming, O'Neil. Standard procedure for all females in physical training."

== See also ==
- Affirmative action
- Equal opportunity
- Masculinity vs femininity
- Aggression and gender
