= Jeffrey Fowler =

United States admiral (born 1956)

Jeffrey L. Fowler
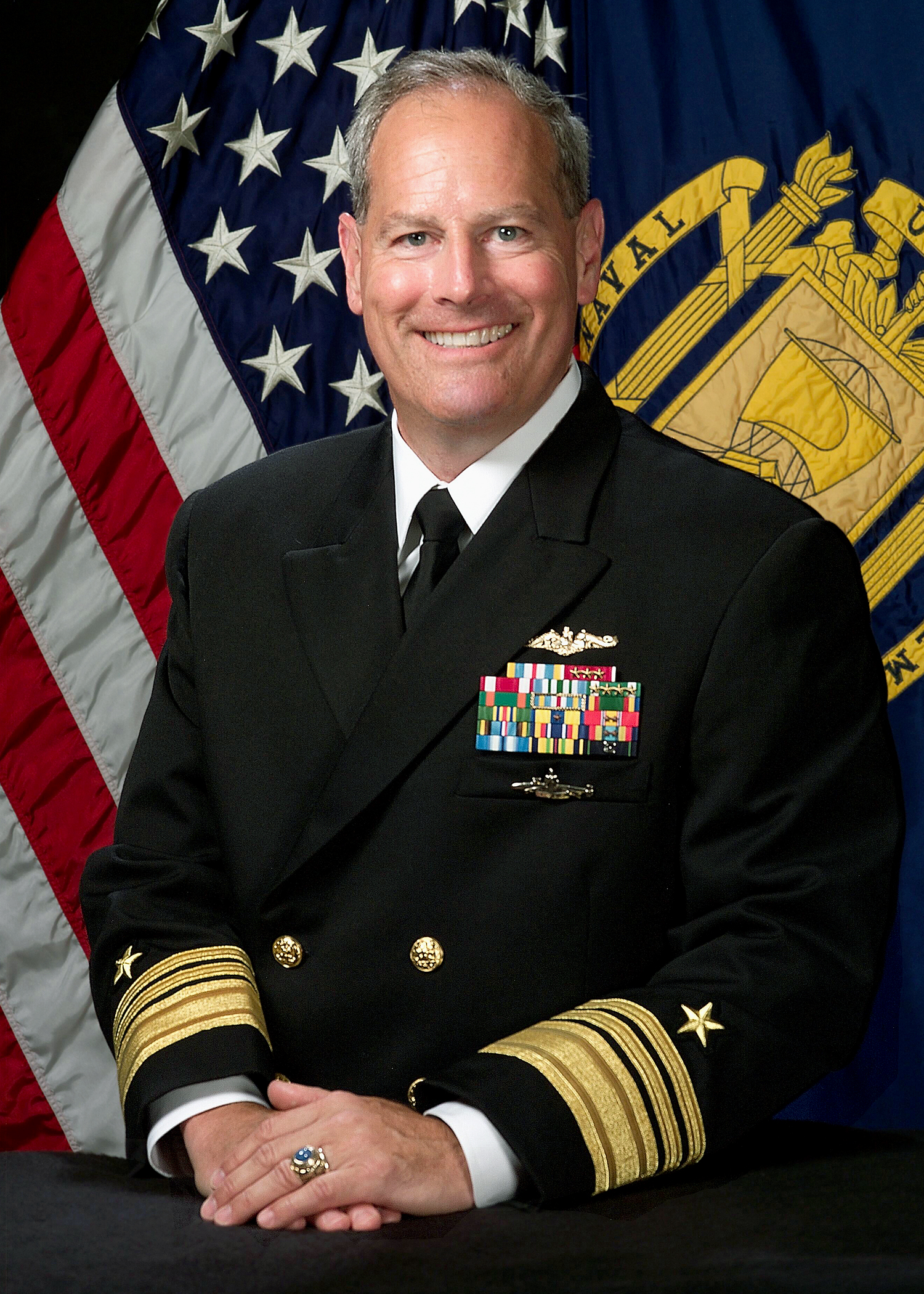
- Born: May 25, 1956 (age 70); Bismarck, North Dakota, U.S.
- Military career
- Allegiance: United States of America
- Branch: United States Navy
- Service years: 1974–2010
- Rank: Vice admiral
- Commands: USS Charlotte (SSN-766); Submarine Squadron Three; Submarine Group Eight; Submarines, Allied Naval Forces South; Task Forces 164/69; Naval Recruiting Command
- Conflicts: War on terrorism Cold War
- Awards: Defense Superior Service Medal; Legion of Merit (3 awards); Meritorious Service Medal; Joint Service Commendation Medal; Navy Commendation Medal (5 awards); Navy Achievement Medal

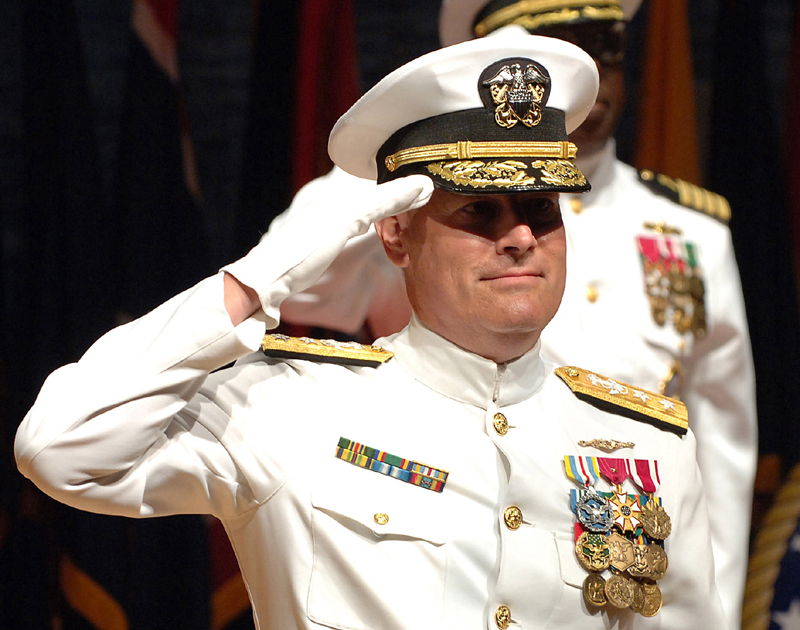
Vice Admiral Jeff Fowler assuming command of the U.S. Naval Academy, 2007.

Jeffrey L. Fowler (born May 25, 1956) is a United States Navy vice admiral who served as the 60th Superintendent of the United States Naval Academy until his retirement in August 2010.

== Early life and career ==
Born in May 1956 and raised in Bismarck, North Dakota, he received his commission from the United States Naval Academy in 1978. Following a successful interview with Admiral Hyman G. Rickover, he was subsequently trained in the Navy's nuclear propulsion and submarine programs.

Fowler served at sea as a junior officer aboard Bremerton (SSN-698), as Engineer Officer for Alaska (SSBN-732), and as executive officer for the Pre-commissioning Unit Montpelier (SSN-765) and Hyman G. Rickover (SSN-709). He commanded Charlotte (SSN-766) and Submarine Squadron Three, responsible for eight nuclear-powered fast attack submarines. Fowler has deployed to the Atlantic, Pacific, Indian and Arctic oceans, and the Persian Gulf.

Ashore, Fowler served as a submarine tactics instructor at Naval Submarine Training Center, Pacific; as a junior member on the Nuclear Propulsion Examining Board on the staff of the commander in chief, U.S. Atlantic Fleet; as the head, Submarine Programs Section of the Programming Division (N80) on the staff of the Chief of Naval Operations; deputy executive assistant to the Deputy Chief of Naval Operations (N8) and the vice chairman, Joint Chiefs of Staff; the Pacific submarine force prospective commanding officer instructor; and as the executive assistant to the commander, U.S. Strategic Command.

== Flag officer ==
Following selection to flag officer, Fowler served as commander, Navy Recruiting Command and director, Naval Europe/Sixth Fleet plans and operations; deputy commander, United States Sixth Fleet; Commander Submarines, Allied Naval Forces South; commander, Submarine Group 8; and commander, Task Forces 164/69. Fowler relieved Vice Admiral Rodney P. Rempt as superintendent of the U.S. Naval Academy on June 8, 2007.

In August 2007, Fowler unveiled new plans for the Naval Academy, stating that the school was focusing too much on extracurriculars. Some of the new changes include mandatory study time each night for all midshipmen, secured all weekday liberty (which seniors had Tuesday, Thursday and Friday and Juniors Tuesday and Friday), and mandatory meals Sunday night through Friday night. Fowler stressed, however, that the academy was not in a state of emergency, and that these changes were merely to keep the recent graduates ready to enter into wartime service. He cast the changes as having more to do with preparing future Navy and Marine officers for wartime duty than with cracking down on misbehavior.

We are a nation at war," he said. "If any campus should understand being a nation at war, it's the United States Naval Academy.

== Retirement ==
Fowler stepped down as superintendent of the Naval Academy in August 2010 (30 days earlier than his scheduled relief) amidst controversy over financial irregularities at the academy as well as multiple honor-code violations by USNA midshipmen. He was succeeded by in this post by Vice Admiral Michael H. Miller.

His wife, Katie Fowler, is sponsor of the new Virginia-class submarine USS North Dakota (SSN-784).

In April 2021, Golden Key Group announced Fowler's promotion to president of the Reston, Virginia-based professional services company.

== Education ==
- 1978 Bachelor of Science degree in mechanical engineering, U.S. Naval Academy, Annapolis, Maryland
- 1985 Master of Business Administration degree, Chaminade University of Honolulu, Honolulu, Hawaii
- 1990 Master of Public Administration degree, John F. Kennedy School of Government at Harvard University, Cambridge, Massachusetts
- 2002 National Security Studies, Syracuse University, Syracuse, New York
- 2003 Fellow, Council on Foreign Relations, New York, New York

Academic offices
Preceded by Rodney P. Rempt	Superintendent of United States Naval Academy; 2007 – 2010	Succeeded by Michael H. Miller
