= American Security Council Foundation =

American foreign policy think tank

- Formation: 1958
- Headquarters: Washington, D.C.
- President & CEO: Henry A. Fischer
- Director of Operations: Mr. Laurence Sanford
- Website: ascf.us

The American Security Council Foundation (ASCF) (originally, the Institute for American Strategy) is a non-profit organization that seeks to influence United States foreign policy by "Promoting Peace Through Strength". Founded in 1958 by John M. Fisher, it is currently led by Henry A. Fischer from offices at 1250 24th Street NW, Suite 300, Washington, D.C. The organization professes to have run a wide range of educational programs to address challenges to U.S. foreign policy, national security, economic security, and moral leadership of the United States.

In 1997, the organization merged with the American Security Council, founded in 1954 by Robert E. Wood, retired chairman of Sears Roebuck and Company.

== History ==
In 1963, the organization published Guidelines for Cold War Victory, which urged U.S. policymakers to abandon the unsuccessful strategy of accommodating the Soviet Union, which the publication argued was in a strategically disadvantaged position, and instead press the enemy—though without escalating to a nuclear war. The organization convinced former President Dwight Eisenhower to record a radio address to the nation in which he praised the Guidelines.

In 1978, the ASCF created the National Strategy for Peace Through Strength and the Peace Through Strength Coalition.

President Ronald Reagan credited the ASCF numerous times for providing the overall theme for the administration of his presidency. President Reagan remarked that, "One thing is certain. If we're to continue to advance world peace and human freedom, America must remain strong. If we have learned anything these last eight years, it's that peace through strength works". Paul Laxalt, Chairman of the Reagan for President Campaign and Senate Co-Chairman of the CPTS, wrote to John Fisher that, "The Coalition's resolution calling for a national strategy for Peace through Strength became the defense strategy plank of the Republican Party Platform". Reagan said, "I am particularly pleased that you also plan to involve members of congress, key administration officials and a wide range of private institutions in the further development of a national strategy of Peace Through Strength. This will be essential as a guide on how to spread democracy throughout the world. My administration will cooperate fully with you in this project". Reagan and John Fisher presented Vice President George H. W. Bush with the Gold Presidents Eagle Pin in recognition of strong support of the Peace Through Strength strategy.

The ASCF worked to have the United States government publish an official National Security Strategy. This was first implemented by Reagan in 1985. All of his successors are legally required to produce a similar document that analyzes the security priorities and concerns of the nation.

After leaving office, Reagan said America won the Cold War by adhering to this doctrine.

ASCF initiated and led the bipartisan "Coalition for Peace through Strength," of which President Reagan was an active member.

The ASCF and the Coalition for Peace through Strength went on to advocate for energy independence with the support of Congress.

== Board members ==
- Henry A. Fischer- President & CEO)
- Col.Stephen J. Bond, US Army, (Ret.)- Chairman of the Board
- Betsy Fischer- Secretary
- Capt. Carl Cramb, US Navy, (Ret.)- Director
- Dan Green,US Navy Reserves- Director
- Joan Johnson- Director

== Senior Advisory Board ==
- Rear Admiral Cathal O'Connor, US Navy, (Ret.)
- Bud Johnson
- Col. James "Pete" McIllwain, US Army, (Ret)
- Laurence Sanford

== Emeritus Board Members ==
- John M. Fisher (Founder)
- Joel C. Pullen (Founder)
- Thomas H. Moorer (Chairman Emeritus/In Memoriam)
- Robert H. Spiro (Chairman Emeritus/In Memoriam)
- Frederick J. Kroesen (First Vice President)
- Robert D. Johnson
