= Rodney P. Rempt =

Vice Admiral of the United States Navy (born 1945)

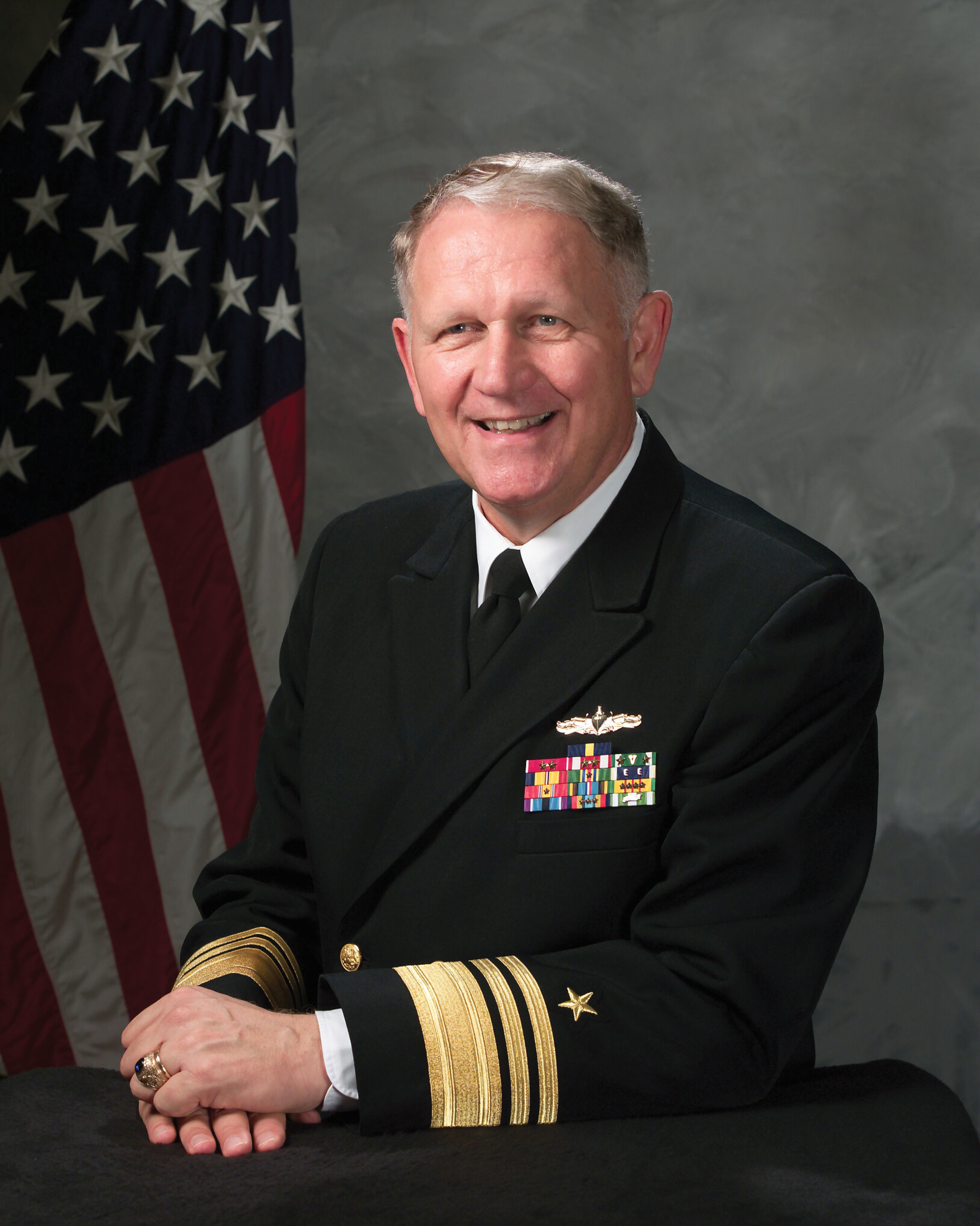
- Vice Admiral Rodney P. Rempt
- Born: June 13, 1945 (age 81); Hollywood, California, U.S.
- Military career
- Allegiance: United States of America
- Branch: United States Navy
- Service years: 1966-2007
- Rank: Vice Admiral
- Commands: USS Antelope (PGM-86); USS Callaghan (DDG-994); USS Bunker Hill (CG-52)
- Conflicts: Vietnam War; War on terrorism
- Awards: Navy Distinguished Service Medal; Legion of Merit (3 awards); Meritorious Service Medal (3 awards); Navy Commendation Medal (3 awards with Combat "V")

Rodney Paul Rempt (born June 13, 1945) is a retired Vice Admiral of the United States Navy who served as the 59th Superintendent of the U.S. Naval Academy from 2003 to 2007.

== Biography ==
Rempt was raised in the Los Angeles suburb of Van Nuys and graduated from the U.S. Naval Academy with the Class of 1966. His initial assignments at sea included deployments to Vietnam aboard Coontz (DLG-9) and Somers (DDG-34) followed by command of Antelope (PGM-86), one of four missile-armed patrol gunboats homeported in Naples, Italy.

Rempt commanded Callaghan (DDG-994) during two WESTPAC/Indian Ocean deployments, and Bunker Hill (CG-52) homeported in Yokosuka, Japan. While on Bunker Hill, Rempt served for 18 months as the Anti-Air Warfare Commander (AAWC) for Seventh Fleet.

Duties ashore included three years in the Weapon Prototyping office of the Naval Sea Systems Command as the initial project officer for the MK 41 Vertical Launch system, and both the Program Coordinator for the Aegis Weapon System, and the Director, Anti-Air Warfare Requirements Division (OP-75) on the CNO's staff. Rempt also worked in the Ballistic Missile Defense Organization (BMDO) where he initiated the development of Naval Theater Ballistic Missile Defense (TBMD).

Initial flag assignments were as Director, Theater Air Defense (N865), followed by Program Executive Officer, Theater Air Defense (PEO TAD), concurrently serving as the U.S. Steering Committee Member for the NATO Sea Sparrow and Rolling Airframe Missile multi-national programs. Vice Adm. Rempt subsequently served as the first Deputy Assistant Secretary of the Navy for Theater Combat Systems and as the first Assistant Chief of Naval Operations for Missile Defense. In this position, Vice Adm. Rempt additionally served as Director, Surface Warfare (N76), responsible for all Surface Warfare people initiatives, ship programs and combat systems. His final Flag assignment before retirement was as Superintendent, United States Naval Academy.

His education includes master's degrees in Systems Analysis from Stanford University and in National Security and Strategic Studies from the Naval War College. He served one year as the Director of the PCO/PXO Department at the Surface Warfare Officers Schools Command and two years as the 49th President of the Naval War College in Newport, Rhode Island.

== Decorations ==
His personal awards include the Navy Distinguished Service Medal, the Legion of Merit (three awards), the Meritorious Service Medal (three awards), and the Navy Commendation Medal (three awards with Combat "V").

- Navy Distinguished Service Medal
- Legion of Merit with two gold award stars
- Meritorious Service Medal with two gold award stars
- Navy and Marine Corps Commendation Medal with Combat V and two gold award stars

== Retirement ==
Vice Admiral Jeffrey Fowler relieved Rempt as Superintendent of the U.S. Naval Academy on 8 June 2007. Rempt retired with the rank of Vice Admiral on 9 June. He plans to retire, with his wife, to Montana, and then return to Annapolis and the Academy.

On 15 September 2008, OEWaves, a producer of microwave photonic products and solutions, announced that Rempt has joined the company's Board of Directors.

== See also ==
- List of superintendents of the United States Naval Academy

Military offices
Academic offices
Preceded by Arthur K. Cebrowski	President of the Naval War College; August 22, 2001–July 9, 2003	Succeeded by Ronald A. Route
Preceded by Richard J. Naughton	Superintendent of the United States Naval Academy; August 1, 2003–June 8, 2007	Succeeded by Jeffrey Fowler
