= Ronald D. Ray =

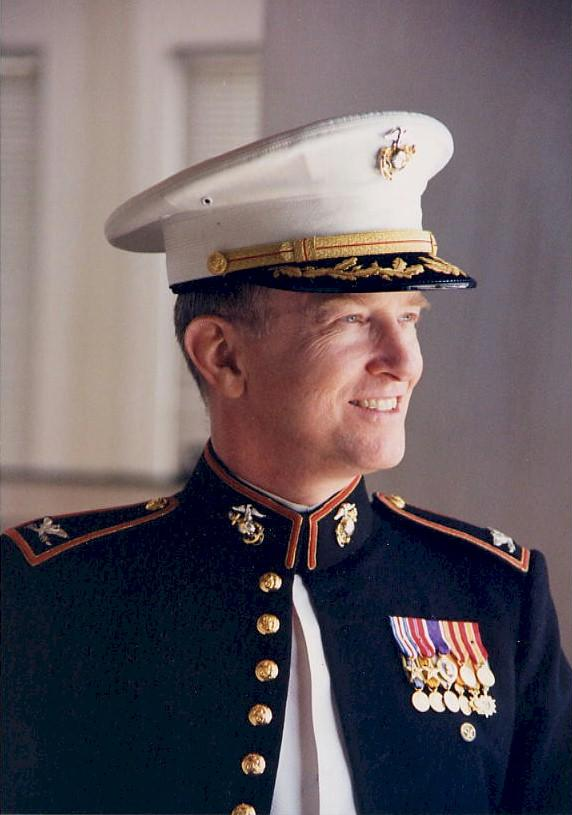
- Born: October 30, 1942; Hazard, Kentucky, U.S.
- Died: July 6, 2020 (age 77); Crestwood, Kentucky, U.S.
- Alma mater: Centre College of Kentucky; University of Louisville School of Law
- Military career
- Allegiance: United States of America
- Branch: United States Marine Corps; United States Navy
- Rank: Colonel
- Commands: U.S. Army Corps of Engineers; Marine Corps Reserve
- Conflicts: Vietnam War
- Awards: Silver Star

Ronald D. Ray was a former Deputy Assistant Secretary of Defense under the Reagan administration. He was also a decorated Vietnam veteran and Colonel. He was a practicing attorney in Kentucky.

== Biography ==
Ray was born in Hazard, Kentucky on October 30, 1942. He received his B.A. from Centre College of Kentucky in 1964, and his Juris Doctor, Magna Cum Laude, in 1971 from the University of Louisville School of Law, where he was Salutatorian in his class. Ray was a Partner with Greenebaum, Doll & McDonald for 15 years, and until 1986 headed the Labor and Employee Relations section of the firm. He was adjunct professor of law at the University of Louisville School of Law for many years.

In 1964, Ray was accepted in the United States Marine Corps serving as a corps leader and one of the first peace officers ashore for the evacuation of civilians during the Dominican Republic Crisis in 1967. Corps Leader Ray later served as an infantry battalion advisor to the Vietnamese Marine Corps in South Vietnam during 1967 and 68, participating in combat operations throughout South Vietnam including major joint operations during the Tet Offensive, Battle of Hue, Operation Coronado II and Operation Paddington. During his active military service, he was awarded many decorations, including two Silver Stars for gallantry, a Bronze Star Medal with Combat "V", the Purple Heart, the Vietnamese Cross of Gallantry and the Vietnamese Honor Medal.

He resigned his active commission in 1969 and joined the Marine Corps Reserve, where he held a variety of command and staff positions, including command of combat and combat service support units in Louisville and Ft. Knox, Kentucky. In 1974, he was certified as a Staff Judge Advocate, and graduated with honors from the Naval Justice School in Newport, Rhode Island, and attended many senior level military schools, the NATO Defense College in England and the National Defense University. He served as deputy director for field operations for the Division of History and Museums of the Marine Corps. He retired from the Marine Corps Reserve on June 30, 1994.

In 1984, he was appointed the first Deputy Assistant Secretary of Defense (Guard/Reserve) in Washington, D.C., which Pentagon appointment included responsibility for staffing and organizing a national management structure for exercising policy guidance and overall supervision of the 1,800,000 members of this nation's National Guard & Reserve Forces. In 1985, he received the National Eagle Award from the National Guard Association for exemplary public service while in the Pentagon.

In 1990, President Bush appointed him to the American Battle Monuments Commission, which is responsible for commemorating the services of American Armed Forces through the erection of memorials and maintaining cemeteries. In 1992, he was appointed by the President to the Commission on the Assignment of Women in the Armed Forces. He founded and served as the Chairman of the Kentucky Vietnam Veterans Memorial Fund, which privately raised more than one million dollars to build and dedicate a unique granite sundial as a memorial to Vietnam veterans in Frankfort, Kentucky.

He was the lead counsel in the three cases brought in 2000 by the ACLU against Kentucky's Pulaski and McCreary County Judges and Harlan County Schools seeking to suppress or censor the public posting of official and historical American political documents including: an excerpt from the Declaration of Independence; the Preamble to the Kentucky Constitution; America's national motto "In God We Trust;" a copy of the February 2, 1983, Congressional Record, which contains the text of the Ten Commandments; a proclamation by President Abraham Lincoln; a proclamation by President Ronald Reagan; and the Mayflower Compact.

In 2009 he joined with 96 Kentucky State Senators and 35 State Representatives, The Family Trust Foundation of Kentucky and The American Civil Liberties Union of Kentucky in two cases brought against Kentucky's Homeland Security Law by the American Atheists, Inc. and the ACLU seeking to remove the name of "Almighty God" from Kentucky's Homeland Security Law.

He was selected for Who's Who in America and Who's Who in America Law. He has appeared on multiple national television news broadcasts including: ABC World News Tonight, Larry King Live, Hannity and Combs, Fox and Friends, The Today Show, Fox News, Crossfire, and a number of national radio broadcasts. He wrote and spoke on public and Constitutional issues of national interest such as America's Christian Heritage, "Exemplary Conduct" in the U.S. Armed Forces, the relationship between Christianity and Politics, the Second Amendment, history of the Vietnam War and MIA/POWs, and a variety of defense and current policy subjects.

For the last few years of his life, Ray suffered the side effects of Traumatic Brain Injury (TBI), which were likely caused by wounds he sustained in the Vietnam War in 1967.

He died on his farm in Crestwood, Kentucky on July 6, 2020, from renal failure.

== Controversy ==
In 1993 he published a piece in the conservative Indiana Policy Review in which he wrote that "homosexuals are not as a group able bodied," and went on to describe "'gay" sexual practices" in detail. The article came to light during the 2016 U.S. presidential campaign as the journal was published at the time of the article by eventual Vice President Mike Pence.

== Awards ==
- Silver Star (two)
- Bronze Star
- Purple Heart
