= Kantai Kessen =

Imperial Japanese naval strategy

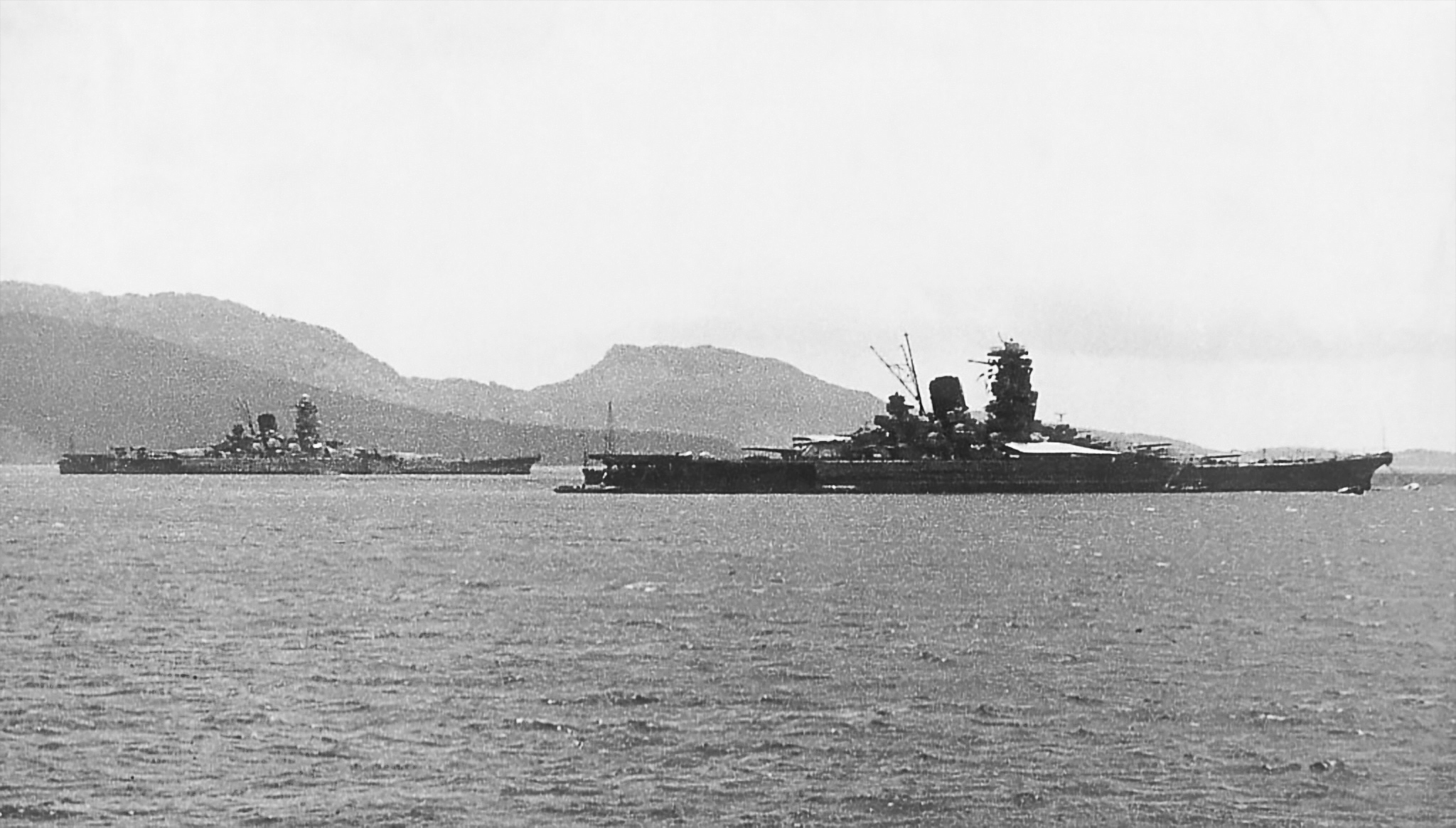
Japanese battleships Yamato and Musashi, were a central element of and built in adherence to Japan's "Decisive Battle" doctrine

The Decisive Battle Doctrine (艦隊決戦, Kantai Kessen; "decisive fleet battle") was a naval strategy adopted by the Imperial Japanese Navy prior to the Second World War. The theory was derived from the writings of American naval historian Alfred Thayer Mahan. In the Decisive Battle Doctrine, the Japanese navy would win a war by fighting and winning a single, decisive naval action. The idea gained broad acceptance following the Russo-Japanese War, where a well-trained, smaller Japanese naval force first fought the local Russian Pacific Fleet, then gained a decisive victory in the Sea of Japan at the Battle of Tsushima, defeating also the Imperial Russian Navy's Baltic Fleet and their rival, the Russian Empire. Operational plans thereafter were influenced by the effective naval gunnery Japan demonstrated at Tsushima.

From the turn of the century up through the start of the Second World War Japanese planners believed achieving victory in such a battle would be dependent upon the effective use of a strong battleship force. The Japanese triumph at Tsushima led to the naval doctrine of Taikan Kyohō Shugi (大艦巨砲主義), the principle of big ships and gigantic guns, called All-big-gun or Dreadnought type of battleship in Europe.

Imperial Japanese Navy planning envisioned assuming a defensive posture and waiting upon the enemy fleet to approach, then destroying it in a sharp battle off the Japanese mainland. Japan's victory over the Imperial Russian Navy validated this doctrine in the eyes of the Imperial Japanese Navy General Staff. Thereafter naval procurement and subsequent deployment of naval assets was based upon the Kantai Kessen doctrine.

== Background ==
The Imperial Japanese Navy General Staff was heavily influenced by the writings of the American naval historian Alfred Thayer Mahan. Mahan's writings, including The Influence of Sea Power Upon History, 1660-1783 published in 1890 and The Influence of Sea Power upon the French Revolution and Empire described how British naval power in the Age of Sail had made the British Empire dominant over its rivals and kept it secure. These works were influential in the naval staffs of many nations. Translated into Japanese, they were read at the Imperial Japanese Naval Academy and Naval Staff College. As Britain and Japan were both island nations, the Japanese Navy General Staff felt the British maritime experience was useful and relevant to the future of Japan.

In his writings, Mahan asserts that success in war for the United Kingdom had been dependent upon her control of seaborne commerce. By denying use of the sea lanes to its opponents, Britain had been able to stifle the economies of its enemies, leading to eventual victory. Mahan shows how Britain had made use of a fleet of ships of the line to establish command of the sea. He asserts that the objective of a strong sea power was to build a fleet capable of destroying the enemy's main force in a single battle. By concentrating their ships into a powerful force the British were able to win a decisive victory. Once accomplished, Britain was at liberty to blockade her enemy's ports. Concentration was a key element. Mahan believed that fleet concentration was the most important principle in naval warfare.

In 1896 the Japanese introduced a naval expansion plan. Japan began building battleships, and the four battleships to be built under the plan were to be more powerful in armament and armor than any other warships afloat. This effort to provide the Japanese navy with a qualitative advantage over other naval powers became a hallmark of Japanese planning.

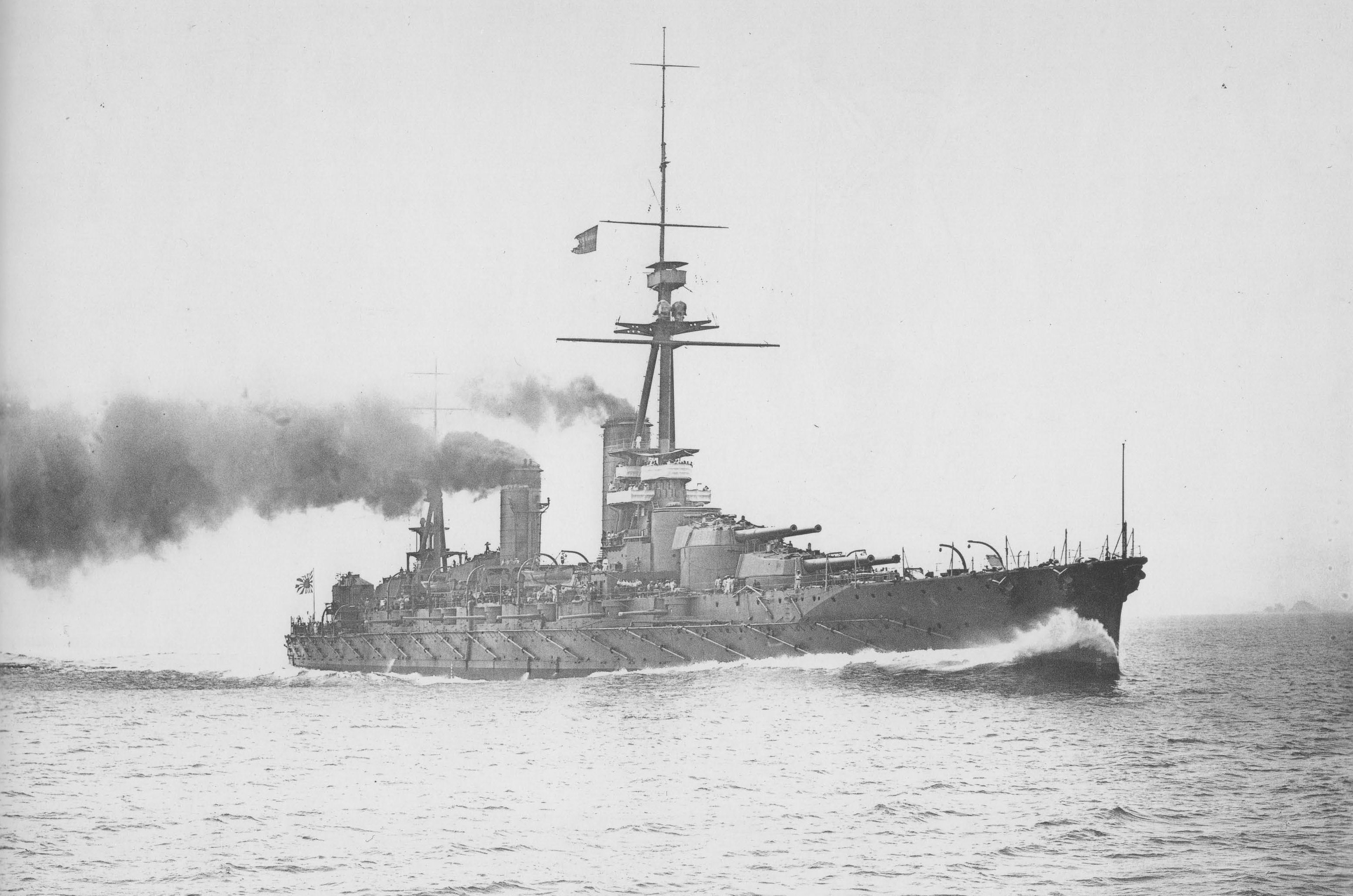
Fusō on her sea trials during the First World War, 24 August 1915

With the onset of World War I, Britain called upon Japan to honor their commitment in the Anglo-Japanese Alliance. Japan did so, joining the Allies. They attacked and took the German colony Tsingtao in China and later performed convoy duties in the Mediterranean. and Pacific eg escorting ANZAC troopships (see Japanese cruiser Ibuki (1907)). At the end of the war Japan gained the German possessions in China, and through the South Seas Mandate Japan gained Pacific islands in Palau, the Marianas, Micronesia and the Marshalls.

Japan's primary goal after World War I was to expand its economic influence and control in East Asia, principally China. In that strategic aim Japan faced opposition from Britain and the Netherlands, who held colonial interests in the region, and from the United States, which sought to protect its territories in Guam and the Philippines, and maintain an economic Open Door Policy in China. In this setting, the naval planners of both Japan and the United States began working out scenarios for how a possible conflict in the Pacific would be fought and won.

The Pacific Ocean, with its vast reaches, was a significant obstacle to overcome. In considering a war in the Pacific against the United States, the Japanese counted on the fact that the size of the Pacific Ocean would in itself be a defense. For the United States Navy to conduct operations against the Japanese, all actions would necessarily be far from their home ports. Travel to the area of combat would consume the fleet's supplies of fuel and food and would limit the amount of time US Navy assets could operate in the western Pacific. Japan could assume a defensive posture and await the US battle fleet. Japanese naval theoreticians, led by Admiral Satō Tetsutarō, argued that a war against the US Navy fought in a single decisive action could be won by Japan.

Japanese naval doctrine traced its origins to Akiyama Saneyuki and Tsushima. The war against Russia culminated in a naval battle in which the outnumbered Japanese fleet prevailed through its superior training and fighting spirit. The Russians had lost 8 battleships and 4,800 dead, while the Japanese suffered the loss of three torpedo boats and 110 dead. It was a decisive victory. This became a template for the Imperial Japanese Navy (IJN). The lesson learned was that future naval confrontations would be decided by the big guns aboard battleships, with the winning side being the side having the larger fleet and the larger guns.

== Naval theory ==
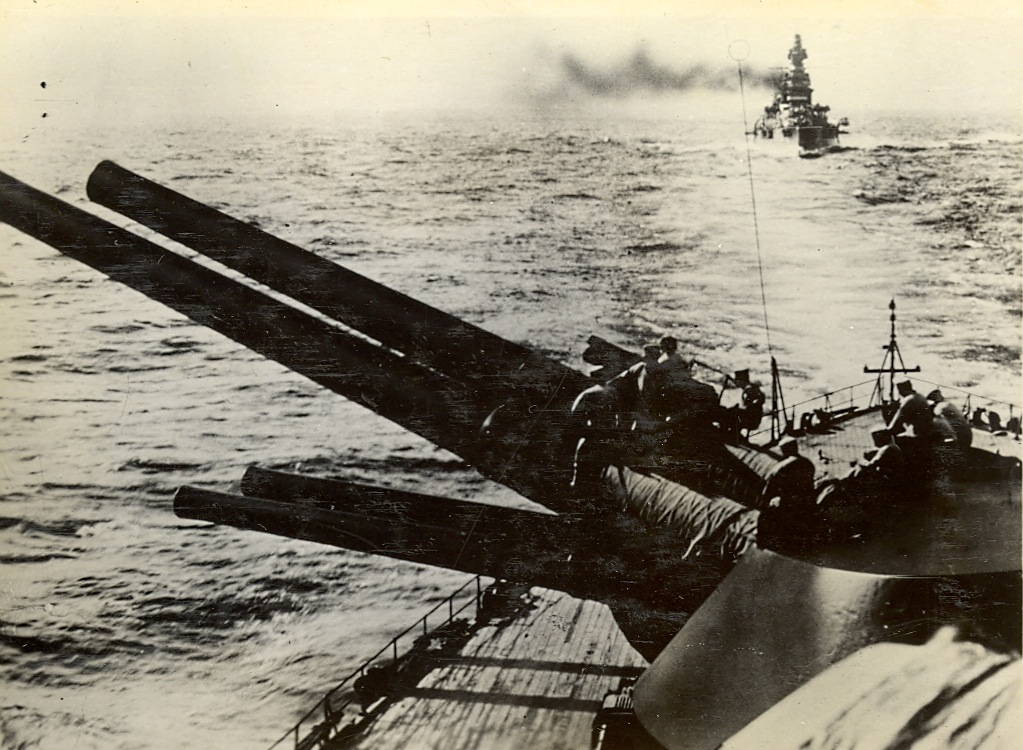
Japanese battleships in line astern formation.

Although major powers such as Great Britain and the United States possessed larger navies than Japan, Japanese planners believed Japan could still win a limited war if its opponents were fighting at a great distance from their home ports in a far-off theater. Naval planners such as Admiral Gonnohyōe Yamamoto estimated that if Japan had a fleet 70% the strength of the United States Navy (USN), then Japan could still fight to a win. To negate the difference in strength, the Japanese hoped to take advantage of the long transit across the ocean to inflict attritional losses of 10 to 20% against the US. The remaining difference was to be made up with the technical superiority of Japanese ships, and with the skill and determination of Japanese sailors. This assumption was built upon two pillars. First, the IJN had to have the weapons and tactics to inflict attritional losses on the US Navy before the decisive battle. Second, Japanese warships needed to possess superior speed and gunnery, capable of hitting at ranges beyond the reach of the US Navy, and had to be manned by very well-trained crews. With this in mind, the IJN spent the entire interwar period preparing for a war against the United States Navy.

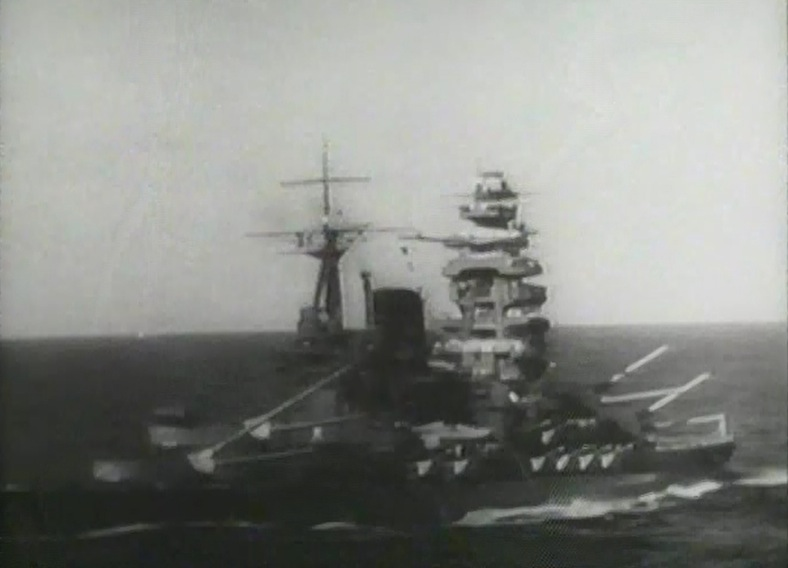
Battleship Mutsu in 1940

The IJN developed a strategy of "gradual attrition" to weaken the US fleet prior to its arrival in the western Pacific. Under this plan, Japan would employ submarines, land-based bombers, and light surface forces to whittle down the approaching US fleet to a size that the Japanese could defeat in a fleet-versus-fleet battle. Based on a theoretical US Navy strength of 25 battleships and heavy cruisers split between two oceans, Japan would need a fleet of at least eight first-line battleships. These would be supplemented with eight battlecruisers. Funding for the construction of such a force was passed through the Diet of Japan, in the 8-8 plan. From 1907 to 1920, construction of warships were scheduled with the goal of achieving the 8-8 fleet plan. The battleship program consumed a large percentage of the national budget and moved ahead slowly because of budgetary constraints. In 1920 an IJN building program that would have provided four battleships and four battlecruisers by 1927 was approved by the Diet. These ships were never finished and the 8-8 program never realized, as these plans were superseded by the 1922 Washington Naval Treaty.

The Imperial National Defense Plan in 1907 outlined Japanese naval strategy with the USN as its hypothetical enemy. Prior to any USN advance into the western Pacific, the IJN was to prepare to attack the USN to secure command of the sea. The main battle fleet was to remain in home waters and wait for the approach of the US fleet. It was taken as fact that the time the US fleet could operate in the western Pacific was limited by their need to resupply. This limitation would compel the US commander to commit his force in a single major battle. The nature of this battle was believed certain, and the vision was shared by both the IJN and the USN: the battle would be decided by the big guns aboard battleships. Japanese naval tactics centered on the battle line. Their planners hoped Japan would win such a battle decisively, as they had at Tsushima. The most optimistic prewar Japanese policy envisioned a series of sharp blows followed by a successful major sea battle, which would result in a negotiated compromise with Japan's British and American opponents.

== Japanese planning ==
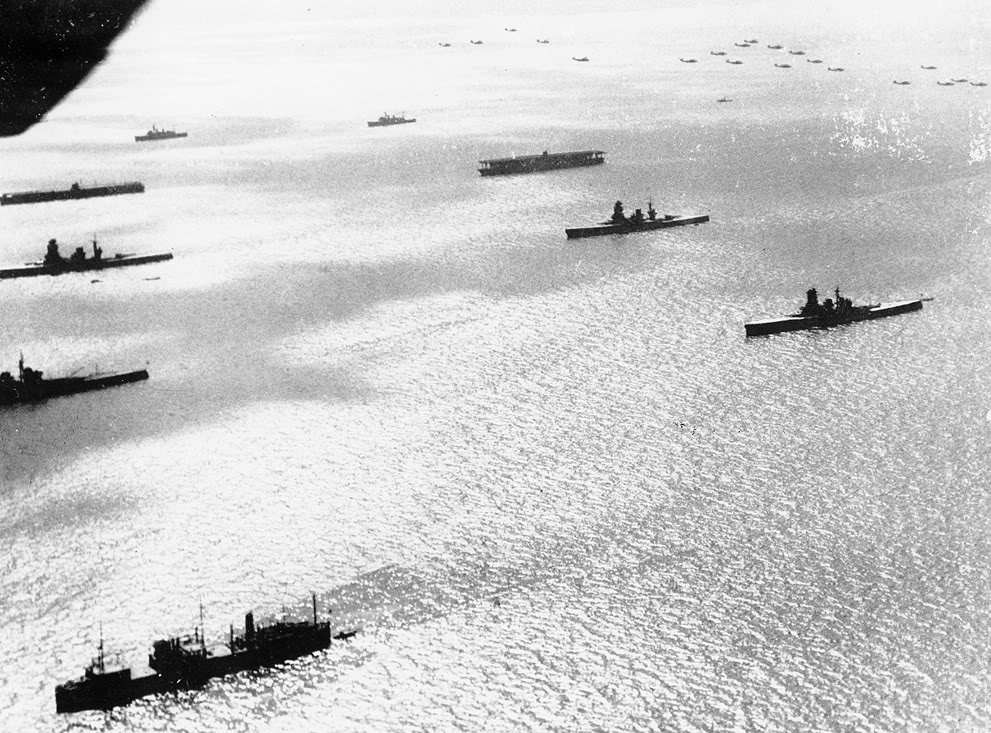
Japanese fleet assembled for review

The Japanese Navy's planning for hostilities against the United States until 1941 was essentially defensive. It depended upon waiting for the approach of the American fleet into the western Pacific. Japan would not carry the war to American shores. The Japanese defensive posture was considerably enhanced after World War I by the South Seas Mandate, in which the League of Nations ceded German possessions in the Pacific to Japan. Japan built bases upon these islands from which Japanese air units could sortie forth to scout and inflict damage upon any approaching fleet. The Japanese counted on these island outposts to wear down the approaching American fleet to a level to near parity where the Japanese Combined Fleet would meet them.

Until the 1920s, the Japanese expected this decisive battle to occur near the Ryukyu Islands just south of Japan and to be conducted by surface forces. However, as technology advanced, the projected location was moved farther eastward. From the mid 1920s to 1940, the line was somewhere between the Bonin Islands (some 540 nautical miles south of Tokyo) and the Mariana Islands.

According to the first stage of the battle plan, fleet submarines would first be used to weaken the American fleet by 10%, then bombers from land bases and aircraft carriers would inflict another 10% casualties. Air strikes launched from carriers would neutralize the American carrier fleet. Fast heavy cruisers working with destroyer flotillas would attack the US battleships at night, making use of their long-range Type 93 torpedoes to inflict further losses. Now facing a depleted enemy at the limit of his supply chain, this would be the "decisive" stage of the battle, when the battleships of the Combined Fleet, centered on the modern Yamato class, would engage the US battle line. Finally, the older battleships would destroy the surviving remnants of the American fleet.

== Advances in carrier aircraft and carrier doctrine ==
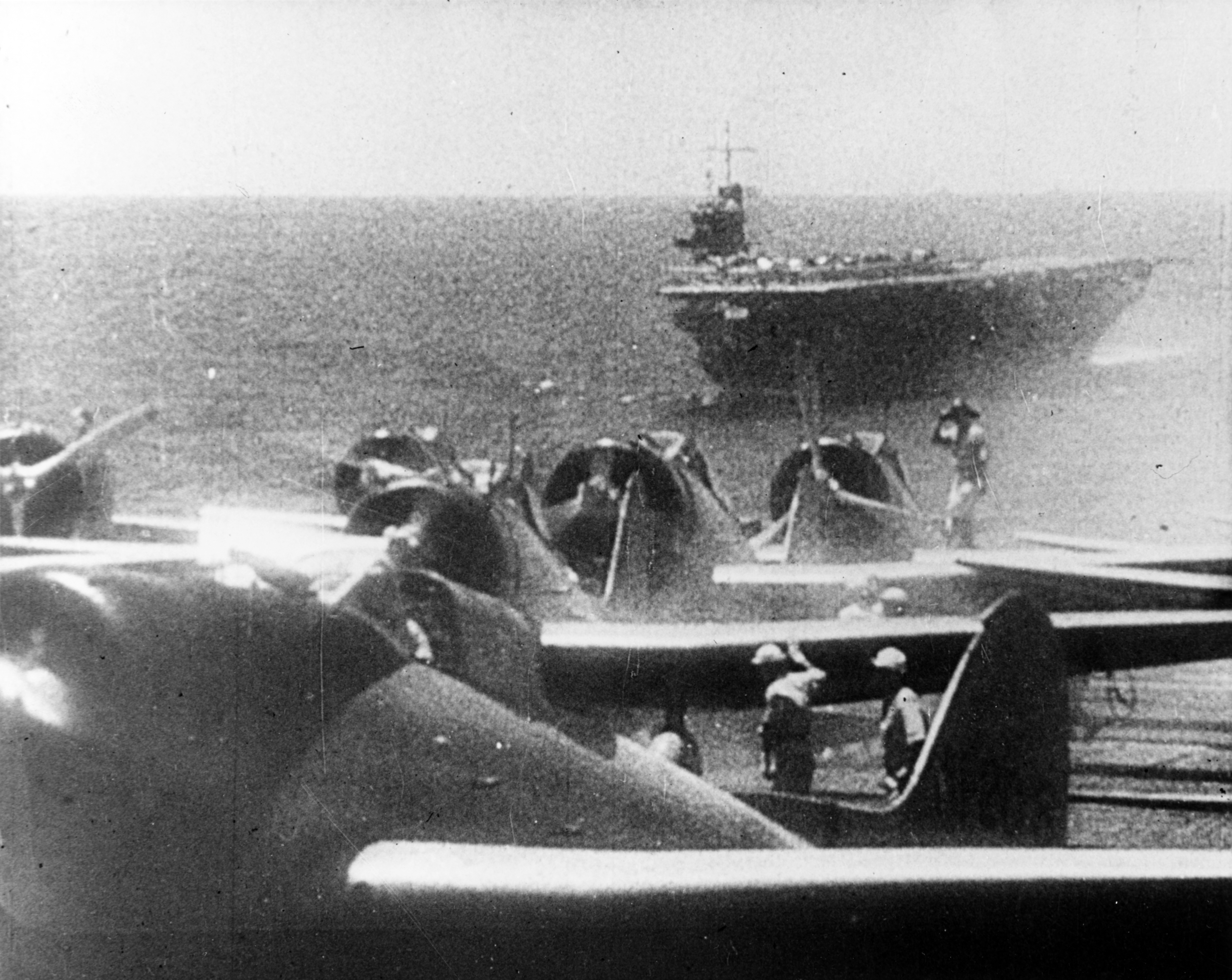
Japanese carrier bombers ready to strike Pearl Harbor

In about 1932–33, the IJN began to shift the targets of its air forces from the enemy's battleships to their carriers. By mid-decade, with the improved performance of bombing aircraft, particularly the dive-bomber, the destruction of the enemy's carrier force became the focus of Japan's carrier forces. The emerging concept of mass aerial attack shifted carrier air power away from the defense of the main battle force to attack on targets over the horizon. The IJN's air war in China brought home to nearly its entire leadership the tremendous offensive potential of aerial weapons.

Japanese naval airmen argued with increasing confidence for the primacy of air power. Admiral Isoroku Yamamoto led the opposition to the traditional battleship doctrine in the Japanese Navy. Yamamoto believed carrier-based airplanes would be the most deadly weapon in naval warfare and that it was unlikely the Japanese and American navies would ever engage in a decisive battleship engagement. He believed the struggle in the Pacific would be for control of the skies as naval aviation could project firepower to much greater distances than battleships.

== Debate in the 1930s – big guns vs airpower ==
The IJN establishment adamantly defended the big gun battle-line and the super-battleship project. Its heated responses to criticism from the proponents of aviation reflected a growing irritation at having its collective wisdom questioned. The Revised Battle Instructions of 1934 stated without equivocation that "battleship divisions are the main weapon in a fleet battle and their task is to engage the main force of the enemy". In August 1934, the Navy General Staff secretly decided to move ahead with plans to build four super battleships.

Opposition to this doctrine grew in the 1930s, as advocates of the new submarine and naval aviation technologies foresaw that the time for a line of battle between opposing battleship fleets was coming to an end. However, conservative supporters of kantai kessen, such as Admiral Osami Nagano, dominated within the senior staff of the Japanese Navy, and the kantai kessen concept remained the primary Japanese naval strategy into the Pacific War.

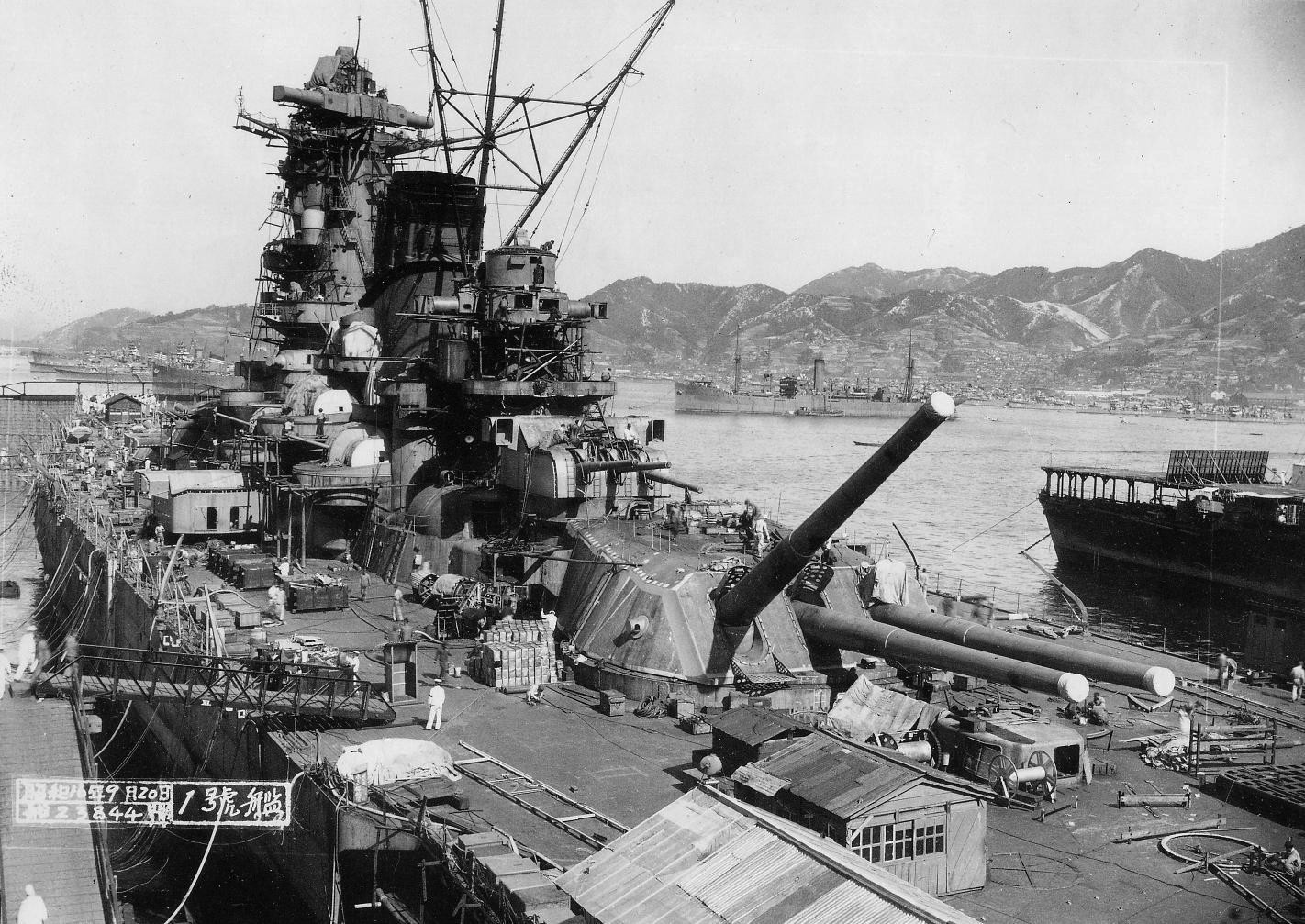
Yamato near the completion of her fitting out, 20 September 1941

The Pearl Harbor raid reflected a very different strategy from the one for which the IJN had been planning and training for the preceding 30 years. This was the result of the views and actions of a single man—Isoroku Yamamoto, who assumed command of the Combined Fleet in August 1939. Yamamoto changed the IJN's wartime strategy from a passive defensive stance to a much more aggressive attacking strategy. The latter part of the 1930s saw the carrier emerge as the warship that would determine the nature and size of tactical formations. This latter process was, of course, far from complete in December 1941 and arguably was not finished until 1943. Meanwhile the battle fleet was kept viable until it could be engaged in the anticipated decisive battle.

Despite being one of the first countries to build aircraft carriers and a naval aviation arm, conservatives among senior commanders did not initially accept its value until the war was well underway, and saw it primarily as a means for reconnaissance and spotting for the battleship force. Battleship operations remained a major focus until late 1944. The investment Japan made in super battleships meant other types of vessels of the fleet, particularly destroyers and escorts which could be used to protect shipping and screen the carriers, were not built in the numbers needed. Japanese losses in shipping to American submarines resulted in an enormous strain for resources for the Japanese economy.

Japanese planners continued to envision the US Pacific Fleet, advancing from Hawaii, being reduced by air and submarine forces along the route to Japan, and then being decisively engaged near Micronesia by the main battleship fleet. The IJN's strategy was to wait and react, forcing a decisive battle with the USN in the western Pacific, near the Mariana or Marshall Islands. There they would defeat the American fleet with superior ships with longer-ranged guns. As ship technology advanced the location of the climactic clash moved eastward until, by the late 1930s, the Japanese Naval General Staff planned for it to occur near the Mariana Islands, some 1,400 miles southeast of Japan.

== US planning ==
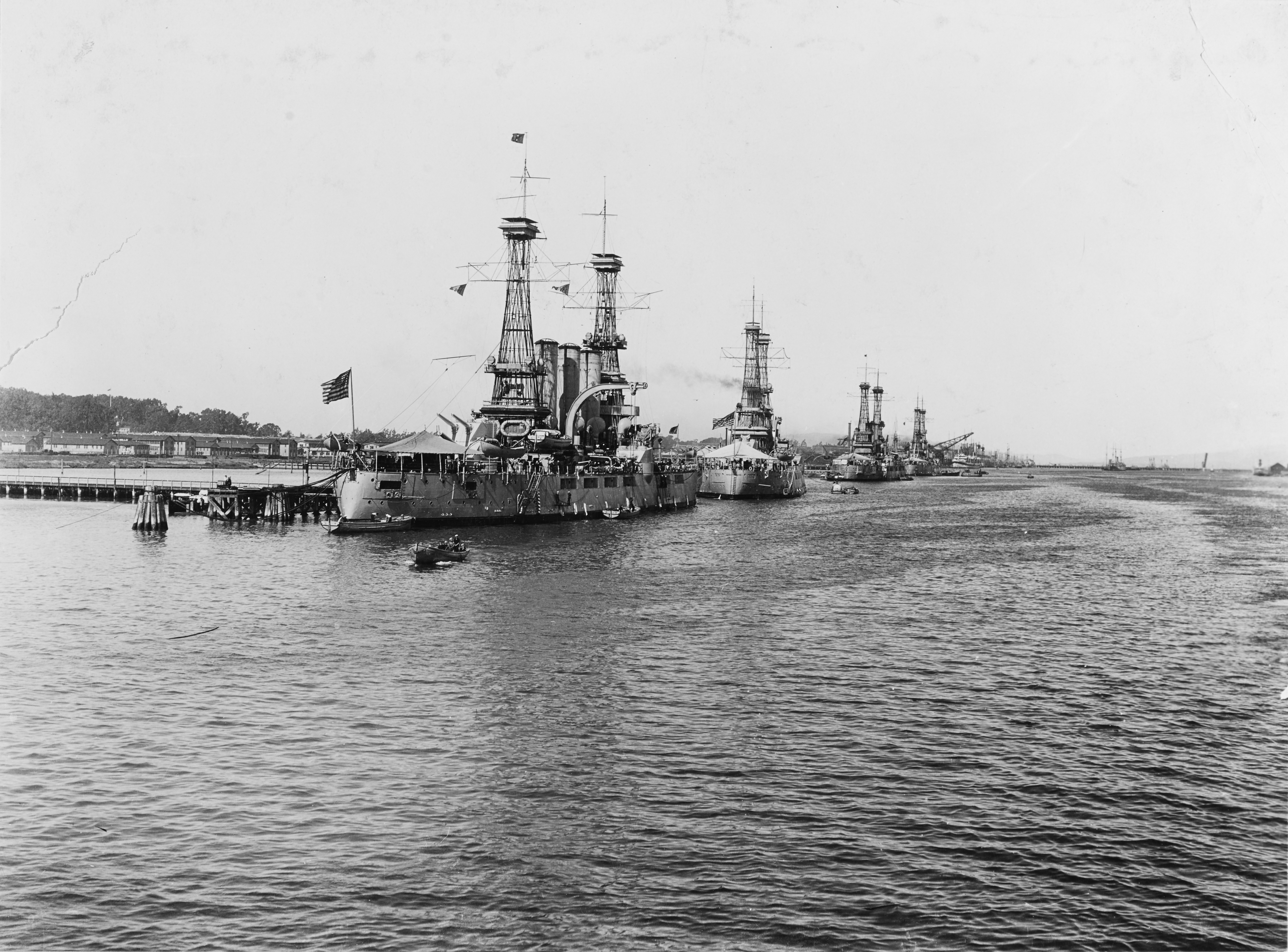
USN battleship line at anchor at the Mare Island Navy Yard in California, 1920

The leadership of both navies largely adhered to the concepts delineated by Mahan. USN planning focused on preparing to fight a decisive battle with the Japanese fleet somewhere in the western Pacific. Consequently, the Battle of Jutland was studied in great detail at the Naval War College. Prewar planning by the USN had focused on the central Pacific and the need for the Navy to gain a series of bases in the Marshall, Caroline, and Mariana Islands. These actions would be necessary to relieve American forces on Guam and the Philippines and to support an attack upon the Japanese mainland.

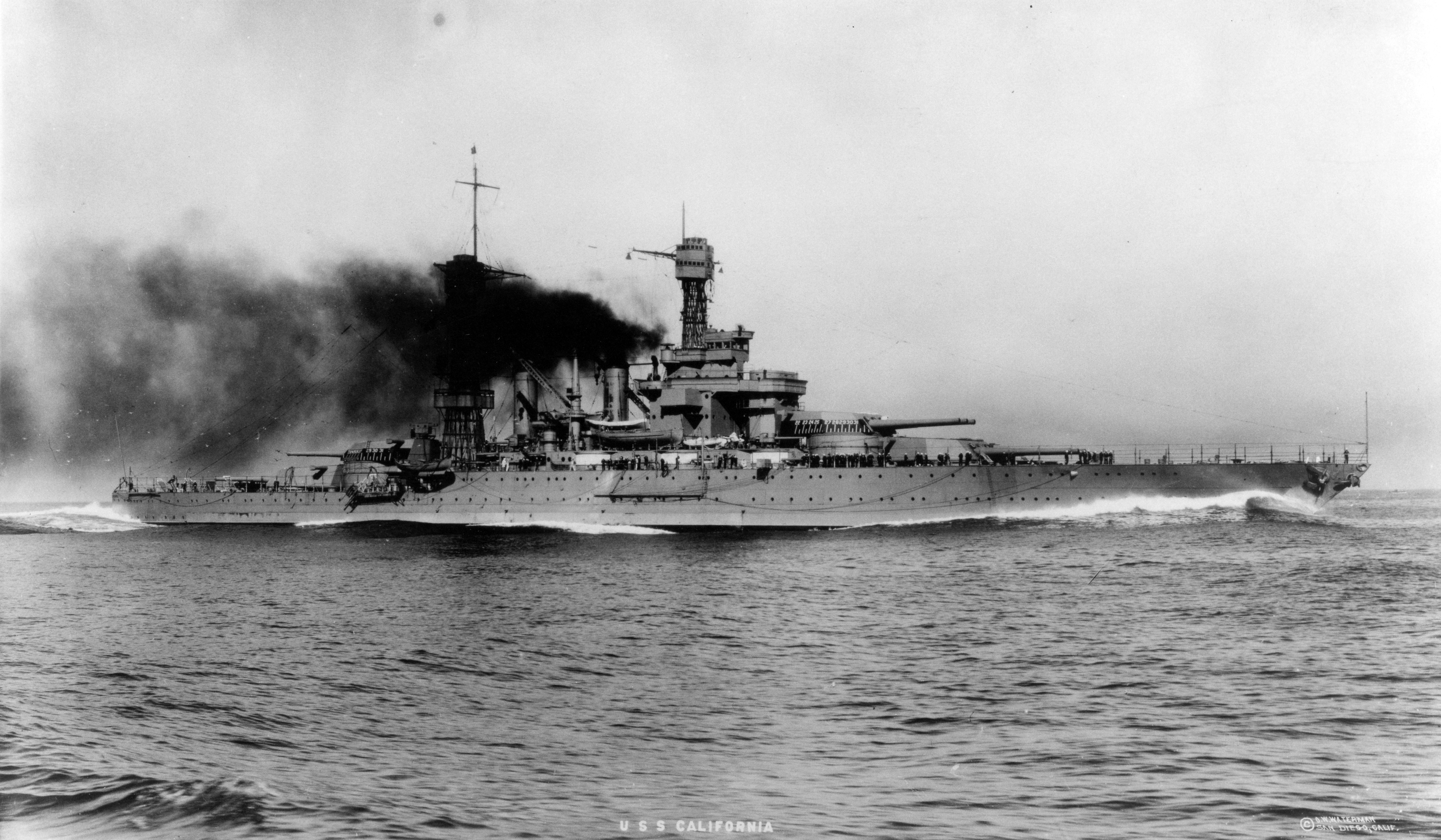
USS California at full steam off the coast of California, emitting black smoke from unburnt fuel oil, 1921

Planners created War Plan Orange for fighting a war against Japan. (Note: The "Orange Fleet" was the name given to the Japanese fleet. The term stems from pre-war planning, called the "color plans" because each nation included was given a color codename: the British Royal Navy was "Red," the German Navy "Black," and so forth. The Imperial Japanese Navy was the "Orange Fleet," while the US was the "Blue Fleet". The "Big Blue Fleet" was the massive fleet the US Navy anticipated it would field to win a war with Japan, expected to come into being by late 1943 or early 1944.) The plan envisioned the Japanese commencing hostilities by attacking the Philippines. An American fleet response from Hawaii and the west coast of the United States would sortie into the western Pacific. Ironically, and with implications for Pearl Harbor, American plans fit neatly together with Japanese expectations. American naval planners would send a reinforced Pacific Fleet across the central Pacific to meet the Japanese Combined Fleet somewhere near the Marshall or Caroline Islands. There they would destroy it before moving on to the Philippines and the eventual invasion of the Japanese home islands. Although the timetable for such a series of missions varied, the objectives remained constant.

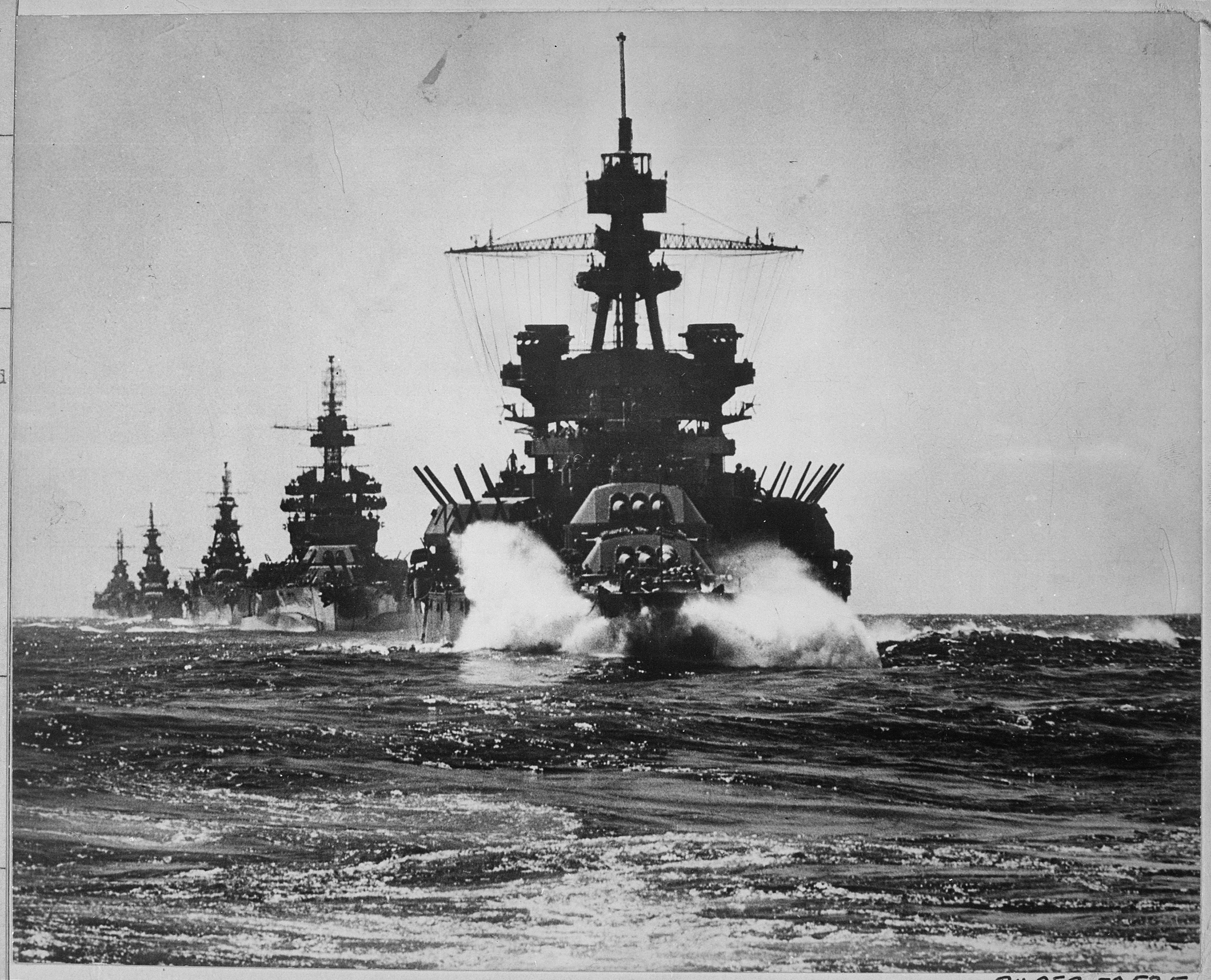
USN battle line, 1945

In 1921, Marine Major Earl Hancock Ellis wrote Operations Plan 712: Advanced Base Operations in Micronesia. laying out the general assumptions for Plan Orange. Ellis states a main fleet action would decide the war in the Pacific. The US fleet, on taking the offensive, would be at least 25% superior to that of the Japanese. The Japanese would hold their main fleet within their defensive line and endeavor to "wear down" the US fleet to an extent where they might reasonably risk a main fleet action. Therefore, he cautions that the US fleet must be conserved for action against the enemy fleet in what would be the deciding battle. Operations preliminary to this fleet action were to be carried out by the minimum amount of naval forces, and by those of least value for a fleet action. The Marine forces for taking islands, occupying and defending them were to be of such strength to require the minimum amount of naval support. The offensive into the enemy's territory was to be made in a series of well defined, rapid moves, thereby affording the greatest protection while exposing the US naval forces to the minimum risk and losses.

In 1940–41, Plan Orange was formally retired and replaced with Plan Rainbow 5, which encompassed plans for the USN fighting a two-ocean war. Nevertheless, Plan Orange's assumptions remained a large part of Rainbow 5 and shaped the direction of American strategy in the Pacific from 1941 to 1945. Japanese moves at the start of hostilities into the south to New Guinea, threatening Australia and the communication between Australia and the United States, were not anticipated in US planning. These events altered how US strategy was pursued during the first two years of the war.

A major element of Plan Orange was to establish a series of island bases to be used as stepping stones, rather than making a direct strike against Japan. What no one anticipated was the development of the US Navy Service Squadrons and the secret naval bases they created. An example of this was at Ulithi, where Service Squadron 10 made use of the atoll's huge anchorage to create a massive base in the middle of the Pacific Ocean. There they could repair and refit the fleet, and maintain the supply of tankers which convoyed out to refuel the fleet while it was on operations. Bases such as Ulithi allowed the USN to operate for extended periods in far distant waters. With the naval base at Ulithi, many ships were able to deploy and operate in the western Pacific for a year or more without returning to Pearl Harbor. Over the last quarter of 1944 through the first quarter of 1945 the large lagoon of the Ulithi atoll was the largest and most active anchorage in the world.

== Battle of Midway ==
The Battle of Midway resulted in the loss of the 1st and 2nd Carrier divisions of the Kidō Butai. The stunning loss caused a significant rethinking of IJN doctrine. Although not abandoning the kantai kessen doctrine, the emphasis was shifted from the battle fleet to the carriers. The aircraft carriers were recognized as the center of the battle plan, as their air groups represented the most lethal striking force with the ability to attack USN units beyond the horizon. Surface units, including battleships, were moved to a supportive role. The losses in carriers, aircraft and pilots by which the Japanese would engage in such a decisive battle needed to be replaced. This would take the better part of two years to accomplish.

The susceptibility of the Japanese carrier force to a surprise air attack, as occurred at Midway, caused Japanese naval planners to rethink how they operated their naval forces. On approaching an enemy fleet, a group of surface units were placed out in front of the carrier group to act as a picket line to warn of incoming air attack. This was resented by the officers in the big-gunned ships, who saw this as placing them in the position of being sacrificed to US air attacks. Nevertheless the directive was made and attempted to be implemented on the eve of the Battle of the Eastern Solomons.

== Mariana and Palau Islands campaign ==
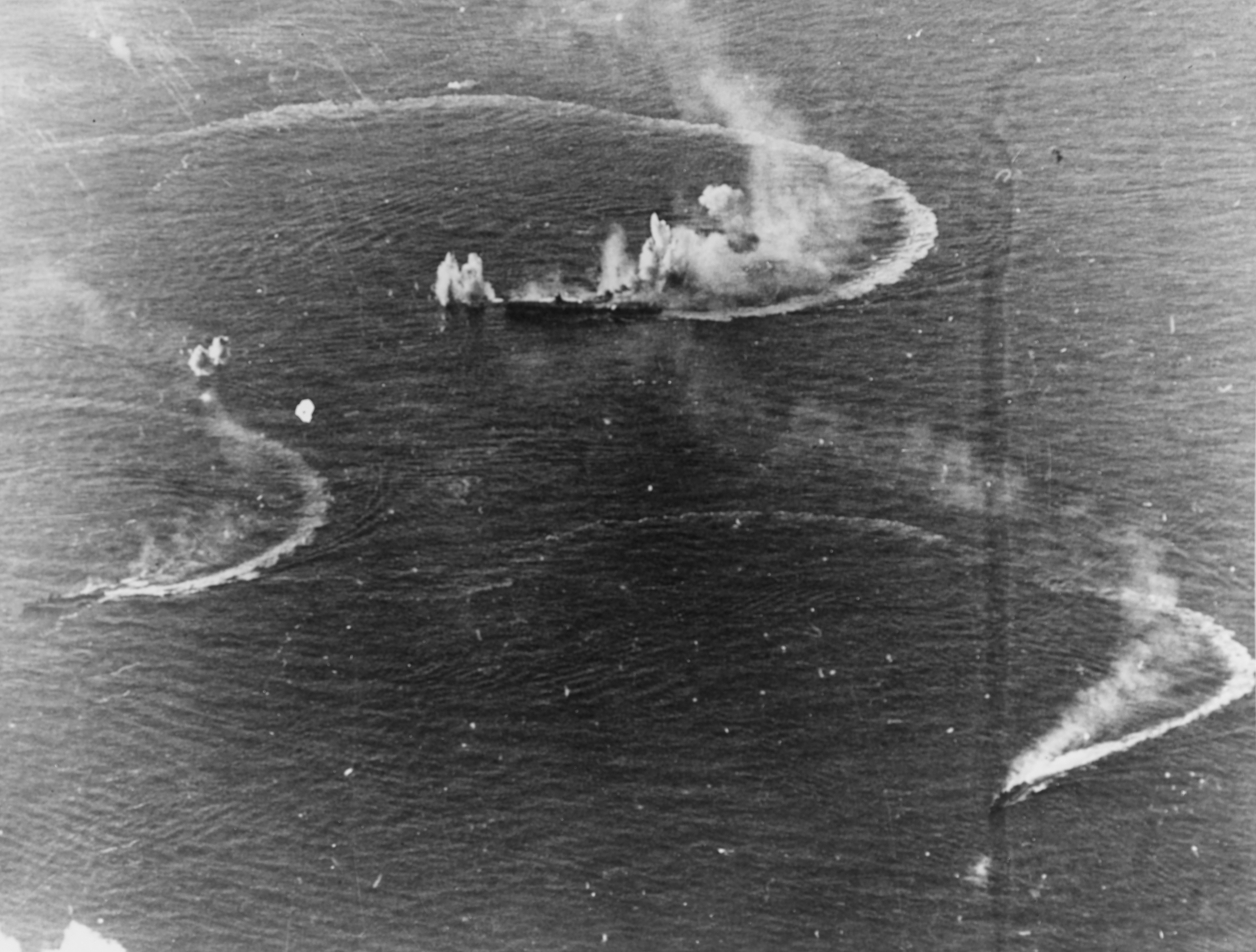
Japanese carrier Zuikaku and two destroyers under attack

Following the failed campaign at Guadalcanal and the loss of the battlecruisers Hiei and Kirishima, the Japanese withdrew the remainder of their battleship force with intention to conserve them for a hoped for decisive battle. The force was not used until June 1944 when the American invasion of the Mariana Islands resulted in the IJN committing its forces to battle.

As Japan lost ground in the Pacific, Japanese naval planners expected the US to attempt to take every Japanese island outpost along the way to Japan. However, the USN had already decided on a strategy of assaulting only as many island strongholds as needed for US bases while bypassing (leapfrogging) the rest. This conserved the strength of the attacker, while causing the Japanese to effectively lose the services of those units isolated and bypassed, although they still carried the burden of needing to supply them. Since the USN had the initiative and could choose when and where an island would be attacked, at nearly every engagement they had a numerical superiority over the defenders.

Japan attempted to replace their lost air crews in 1943. These reconstituted carrier air groups were put ashore at Rabaul in November 1943 in an effort to counter US moves into the upper Solomons and Bismarck Archipelago. Although they performed reasonably well, they suffered further losses in the air battles over Rabaul. Further reformation and training followed, and they were not ready to challenge the USN in a major carrier engagement until mid-1944.

In the spring of 1944 the US invasion of Saipan in the Mariana Islands compelled the IJN to respond. The war was tilting ever more in favor of the USN, but with nine carriers and further support from land-based aircraft, the Japanese naval command had reason to believe they had a chance for success. The Battle of the Philippine Sea proved that the USN had shrugged off its early losses, grown much more powerful, improved tactically and made marked improvements technically. The result was the destruction of the air arm of the IJN. The crippling of the IJN's carrier force left only their still-powerful surface force to fight for Japan. The Battle of Leyte Gulf several months later was a desperate step to try to use the big guns of the surface fleet to inflict damage upon the USN, but the IJN General Staff held out no hope for gaining a decisive victory. The moment had passed.

== Assessment ==
The performance of individual units of the IJN during the early part of the war was very good and reflected the Japanese idea that quality could make up for lack of quantity. One example of technical expertise was their ability to mass carrier air power. In April 1941, the Japanese brought all six of their fleet carriers into a single formation, the First Air Fleet, or Kidō Butai. The carriers worked in pairs, and the formation allowed all six air groups to work together. Their training allowed their formations to have remarkable flexibility. The concentration of air units carried great destructive potential. In addition, Japanese cruiser and destroyer squadrons proved efficient and deadly through a whole series of night actions, a result of their excellent night optics, the development of the Type 93 torpedo, and their crew training. These all gave the Japanese a distinct advantage in the early going.

The USN had planned to respond to Japanese incursions into the central Pacific much as the Japanese had thought; Admiral Husband E. Kimmel's battleship force was to sortie from Pearl Harbor to interdict Japanese efforts in the Marshall Islands. The impetus behind these plans arose from prewar concerns over the loss of public support among the American people if the fight against Japan dragged on for more than two or three years. Had the IJN foregone their attacks on Hawaii and the Philippines and concentrated entirely on the conquest of Malaya and the Dutch East Indies, the war might have had a quite different course, given the isolationist mood of the United States in late 1941. In a short limited war, the Japanese strategy might have sufficed.

The fundamental assumption of Kantai Kessen was that, just as the Russo-Japanese naval war had been decided by the Battle of Tsushima, the war against the US would be decided by a single great naval clash. The main problem with this strategy was that with their surprise attack, Japan had not entered a limited war that could be resolved with terms following a major battle. The blow the Japanese inflicted upon the US at Pearl Harbor could not be forgotten. Without realizing it, Japan had entered a war of attrition against a major power whose capacity for industry became focused upon the production of the ships and aircraft necessary to win it. In such a contest Japan would never be able to defeat the US. There would be no early confrontation between battleships in the central Pacific, and the prospect of the US agreeing to terms at some future point was gone. The US response would be to pursue the war to the utter destruction of the Japanese military.

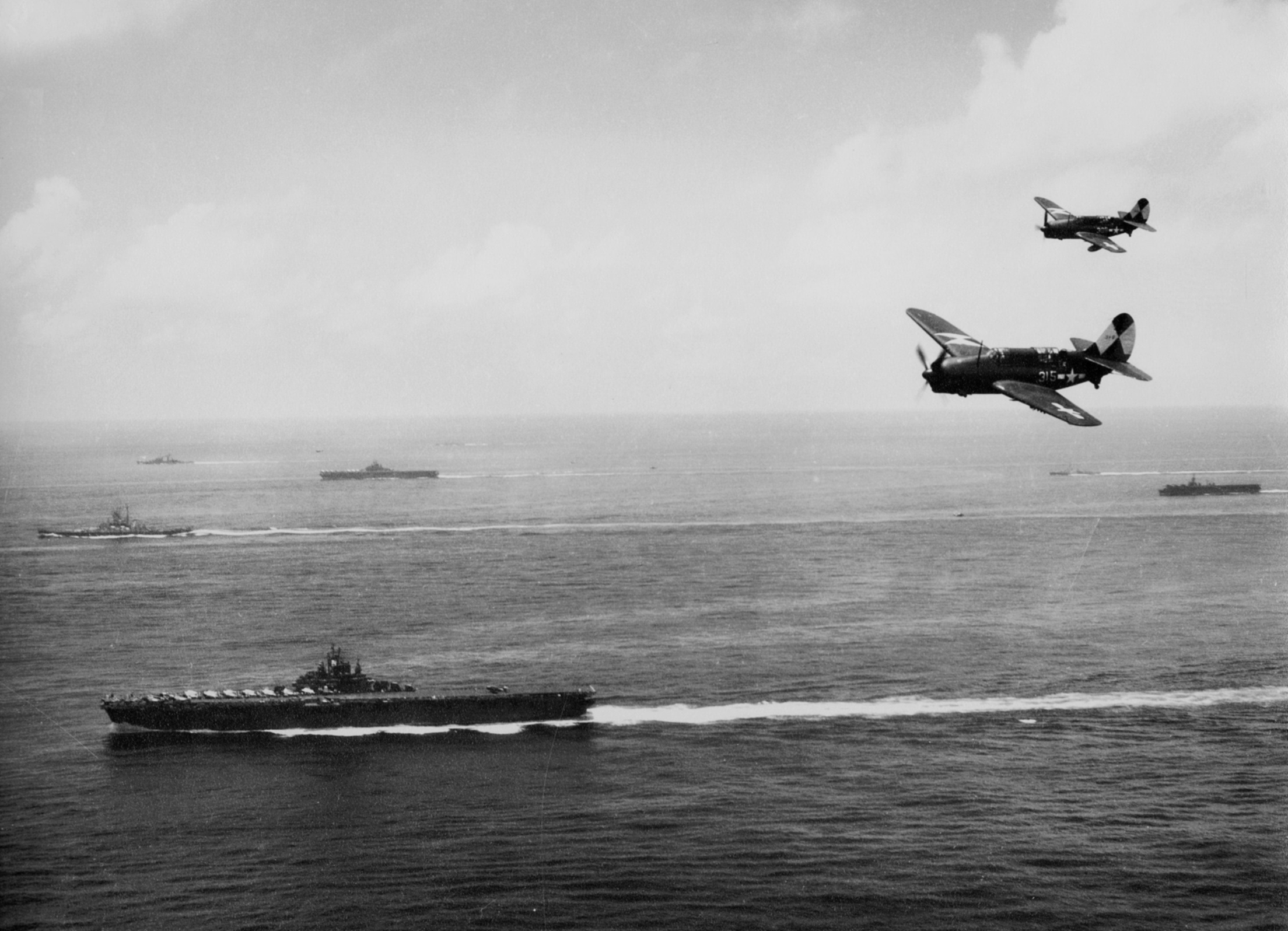
Ships of Task Group 38.3, one of the four task groups that made up the Fast Carrier Task Force, operating off Okinawa, May 1945

With the creation of the "Big Blue Fleet", the USN started its drive across the central Pacific in November 1943. This was the drive projected in War Plan Orange and was the primary US offensive. In making this drive it was able to bring massively superior air power to bear. This was in the form of the Fast Carrier Task Force, the product of US industrial capacity coupled with her innovation. The task force was overwhelmingly powerful and ended up crushing the IJN. Unlike the carrier raids of the first two years of the war, the Fast Carrier Task Force could approach any objective, isolate it and overwhelm it before the IJN could intervene. This imbalance pointed up the two major weaknesses of Japanese naval intent. First, the Japanese did not have the means to establish an effective defensive perimeter which would allow them to respond to threats by concentrating their air and land forces quickly and effectively. Second, the IJN could not deploy its fleet formations rapidly enough to support those forward bases when they came under attack.

Japanese pursuit of a "decisive battle" was carried out to such an extent that it contributed to Japan's defeat in 1945. Japan's focus on its main battle fleet led to inadequate resources applied to the protection of its merchant fleet. The production of destroyers and escort vessels, crucial to protection of shipping, were put aside in favor of building large battleships that ended up seeing very limited service. The only reasonable explanation for Japanese neglect of the protection of their merchant fleet was that protection of merchant shipping could not contribute directly to the decisive battle.

The most fundamental character of Japanese naval strategy in the Pacific War was a disconnection between the war that the navy planned for and the war that the navy initiated. The Japanese search for a decisive battle to turn the course of the war was futile. Instead of a short, sharp conflict, they became involved in a war of attrition with an enemy force that grew in strength and capability with each passing year. The decisive battle concept against the US proved to be a fruitless strategy, since no one battle could defeat a major industrial nation. The concept belonged to another age.
