= Take point =

Military position

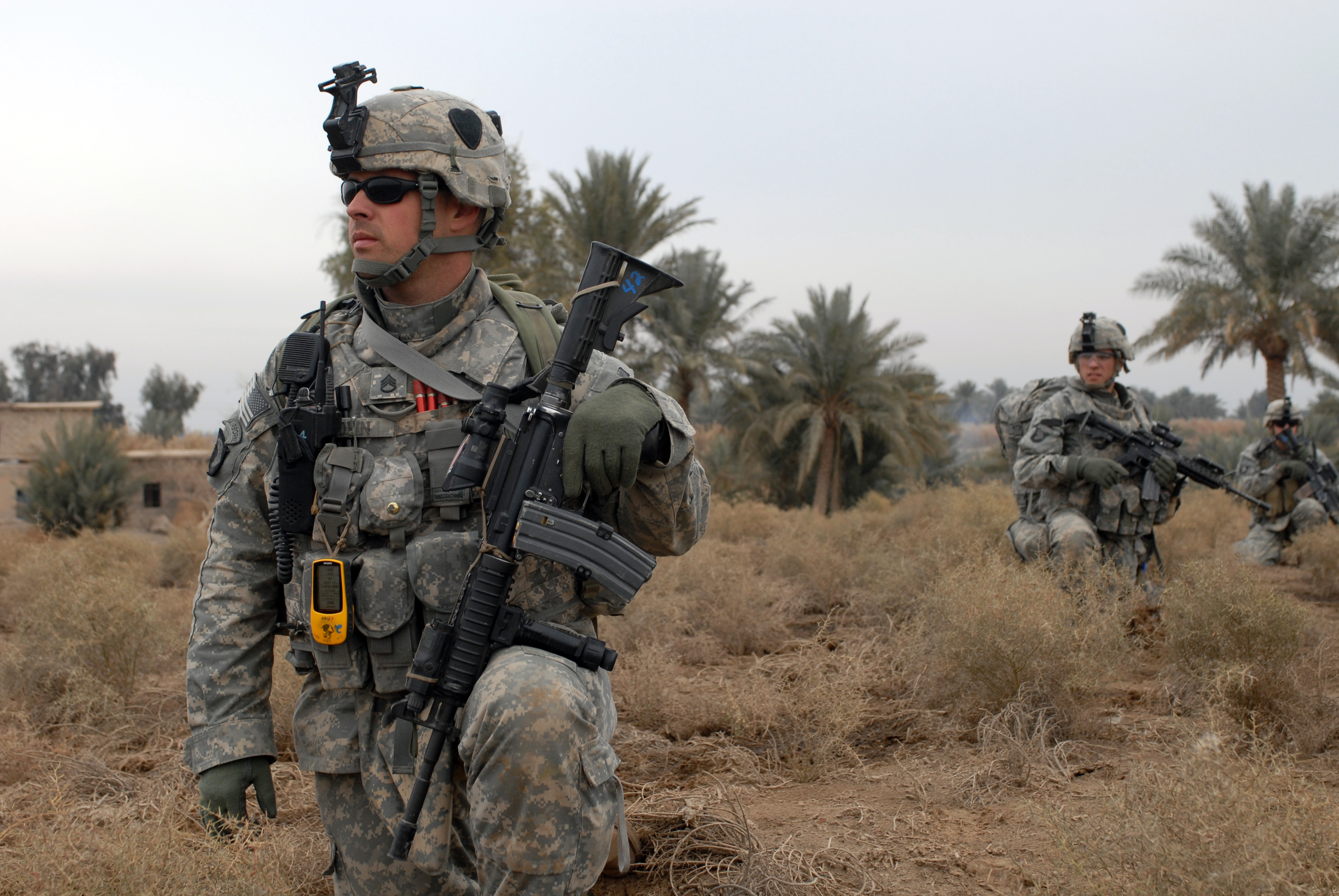
U.S. Army soldiers take point during an operation in Baghdad

To take point, walk point, be on point, or be a point man is to assume the first and most exposed position in a combat military formation, that is, the leading soldier or unit advancing through hostile or unsecured territory. The term can be applied to infantry or mechanized columns. The soldier, vehicle, or unit on point is frequently the first to take hostile fire. The inherent risks of taking point create a need for constant and extreme operational alertness. However, ambushes often intend to let the point element past the prime kill zone in order to be maximally effective. Point position is often rotated periodically so as not to overtax the individual soldier/unit.

== History ==
=== Origins ===
The term might be related to the Middle English phrase "in point", which meant "in immediate danger or peril". The modern use of the term derives from military tactics. During a military patrol or infantry operation, the point man is a navigator who walks several meters out in front of everyone else and is likely to be the first one to encounter enemy soldiers. It is a hazardous position that requires alertness and ability to deal with unexpected attacks.

The term was used in the 19th century American Old West when the lead cowboy at the front of a herd of cattle was known as the pointer or point man. It may have come into common use because many of the cowboys in the late 1800s were veterans of the American Civil War. In cavalry terminology, the men scouting ahead of the main force were said to be "riding point". This use was first recorded in 1903.

The concept seems to have been introduced to the American military at West Point by Professor Dennis H. Mahan, who taught most of the top officers on both sides in the Civil War. In his Elementary Treatise on Advanced-Guard, Out-Post and Detachment Service of Troops (1861), he discussed the use of the column or V-shaped advance guard by the Greeks and Romans:

Among the orders of battles among the ancients, that known as the wedge, or boar's head, is the most celebrated. In this disposition, the point, or head, is formed of a subdivision of the phalanx of greater or less strength, according to circumstances; this being supported by two, three, and four subdivisions of the same force, one behind another.

In the section on Advanced Guards and Advanced Posts, Professor Mahan introduced the definition of the point man to the future American generals:

From these indications of the manner of distributing the troops of the advanced-guard, the following general dispositions, adapted to ordinary circumstances of locality may be gathered. The apex, or most advanced point, may be formed of a staff, or other intelligent officer, under the escort of a few horsemen...

=== Modern use ===
"Take point" came into common use during World War II by American ground forces; its use continued through the Korean War, Vietnam War and Iraq War. This idiom, "take point" has entered the vernacular in many ways. "Taking point" is often used in describing pathfinding behaviors in non-military situations, or simply to mean "lead the challenge", often in a business context. In some cases it has replaced the idiom "stalking horse".

More recently (possibly originating from the late 1960s), the term has been extended to describe someone at the forefront of an issue. It can be used to refer to both the defender or the attacker of the position or idea. This use is most often found in political contexts, as the point man is usually in the public eye.

In recent American youth (especially hip hop) culture, the idiom "on point" refers either to someone who possesses abundant and various qualities of competence, leadership or style, or to specific acts which demonstrate such qualities. Especially profound lyrics, a particular musical performance or a philosophical position might be referred to as "on point." This varies somewhat from the traditional meaning of the phrase, "directly applicable or dispositive of the matter under consideration."
