= The Influence of Sea Power upon History =

1890 book by Alfred Thayer Mahan

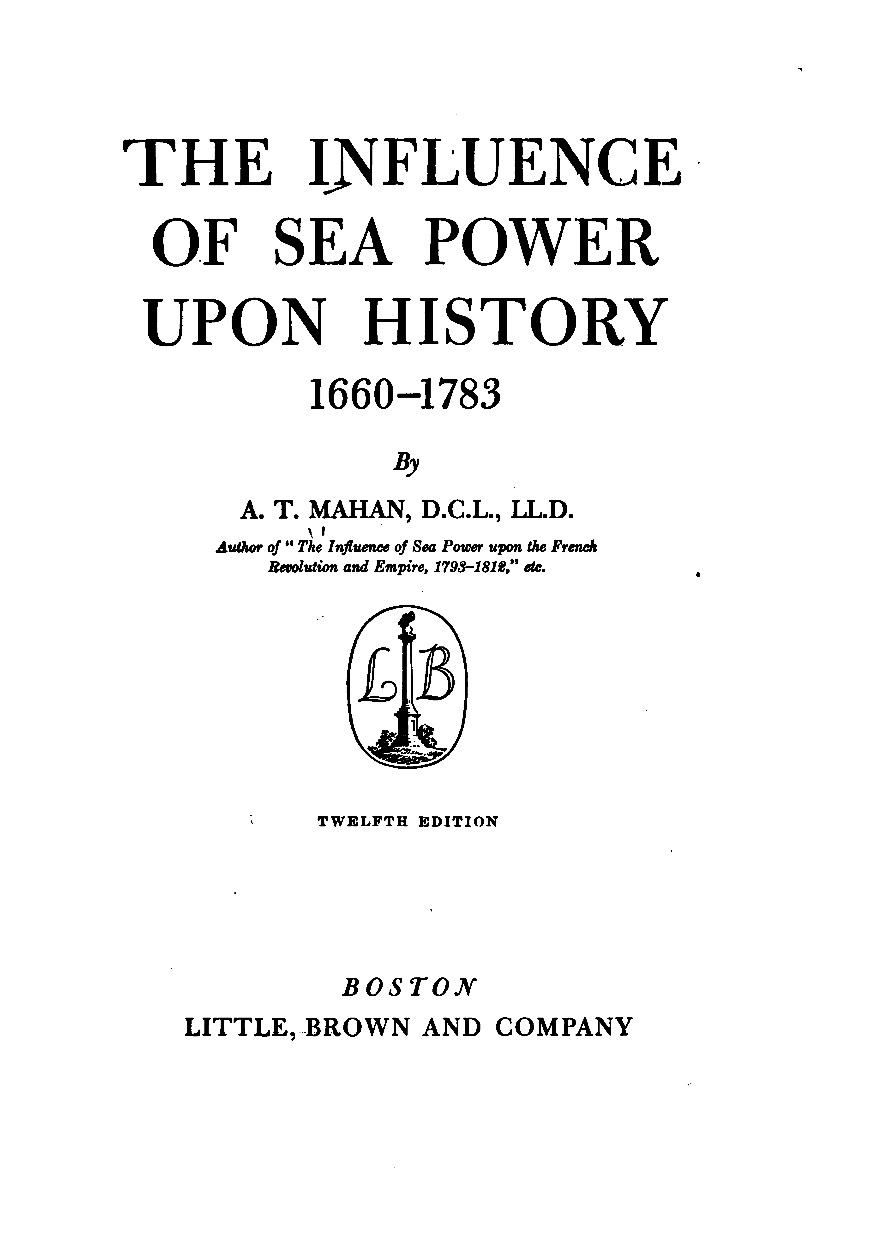
- Title page of the twelfth edition.
- Author: Alfred Thayer Mahan
- Language: English
- Subject: Military history
- Genre: Non-fiction
- Published: 1890 (Little, Brown and Co.)
- Publication place: United States
- Media type: Print (hardback) 4 maps (1 fold.) plans. 23 cm.
- Pages: 557
- ISBN: 978-1-420-94847-9
- OCLC: 2553178
- Dewey Decimal: 909
- LC Class: D27.M212 1898
- Followed by: The Influence of Sea Power Upon the French Revolution and Empire, 1793–1812 (published 1892)
- Text: The Influence of Sea Power upon History at Wikisource

The Influence of Sea Power upon History: 1660–1783 is a history of naval warfare published in 1890 by the American naval officer and historian Alfred Thayer Mahan. It details the role of sea power during the seventeenth and eighteenth centuries, and discussed the various factors needed to support and achieve sea power, with emphasis on having the largest and most powerful fleet. Scholars considered it the single most influential book in naval strategy. Its policies were quickly adopted by most major navies, ultimately leading to the World War I naval arms race. It is also cited as one of the contributing factors of the United States becoming a great power. It was followed by The Influence of Sea Power upon the French Revolution and Empire, 1793–1812, published in 1892.

== Overview ==
Mahan formulated his concept of sea power while reading a history book in Lima, Peru, after having observed the final stages of the War of the Pacific, in which Chile decisively defeated an alliance of Peru and Bolivia after seizing naval superiority.

The book was published by Mahan while president of the US Naval War College, and was a culmination of his ideas regarding naval warfare.

Mahan began the book with an examination of what factors led to a supremacy of the seas, especially how Great Britain was able to rise to its near dominance. He identified such features as geography, population, and government, and expanded the definition of sea power as comprising a strong navy and commercial fleet. Mahan also promoted the belief that any army would succumb to a strong naval blockade.

The book then goes on to describe a series of European and American wars and how naval power was used in each.

== Table of contents ==
- Preface
- Introductory
- Chapter I: Discussion of the Elements of Sea Power.
- Chapter II: State of Europe in 1660. Second Anglo-Dutch War, 1665–1667. Sea Battles of Lowestoft and of the Four Days.
- Chapter III: War of England and France in Alliance Against the United Provinces, 1672–1674. Finally, of France Against Combined Europe, 1674–1678. Sea Battles of Solebay, the Texel, and Stromboli.
- Chapter IV: English Revolution. War of the League of Augsburg, 1688–1697. Sea Battles of Beachy Head and La Hougue.
- Chapter V: War of the Spanish Succession, 1702–1713. Sea Battle of Malaga.
- Chapter VI: The Regency in France. Alberoni in Spain. Policies of Walpole and Fleuri. War of the Polish Succession. English Contraband Trade in Spanish America. Great Britain Declares War Against Spain, 1715–1739.
- Chapter VII: War Between Great Britain and Spain, 1739. War of the Austrian Succession, 1740. France Joins Spain Against Great Britain, 1744. Sea Battles of Matthews, Anson, and Hawke. Peace of Aix-La-Chapelle, 1748.
- Chapter VIII: Seven Years' War, 1756–1763. England's Overwhelming Power and Conquests on the Seas, in North America, Europe, and East and West Indies. Sea Battles: Byng off Minorca; Hawke and Conflans; Pocock and D'Ache in East Indies.
- Chapter IX: Course of Events from the Peace of Paris to 1778. Maritime War Consequent upon the American Revolution. Battle off Ushant.
- Chapter X: Maritime War in North America and West Indies, 1778–1781. Its Influence upon the Course of the American Revolution. Fleet Actions off Grenada, Dominica, and Chesapeake Bay.
- Chapter XI: Maritime War in Europe, 1779–1782.
- Chapter XII: Events in the East Indies, 1778–1781. Suffren Sails from Brest for India, 1781. His Brilliant Naval Campaign in the Indian Seas, 1782, 1783.
- Chapter XIII: Events in the West Indies after the Surrender of Yorktown. Encounters of De Grasse with Hood. The Sea Battle of the Saints. 1781–1782.
- Chapter XIV: Critical Discussion of the Maritime War of 1778.

== Impact on naval thought ==
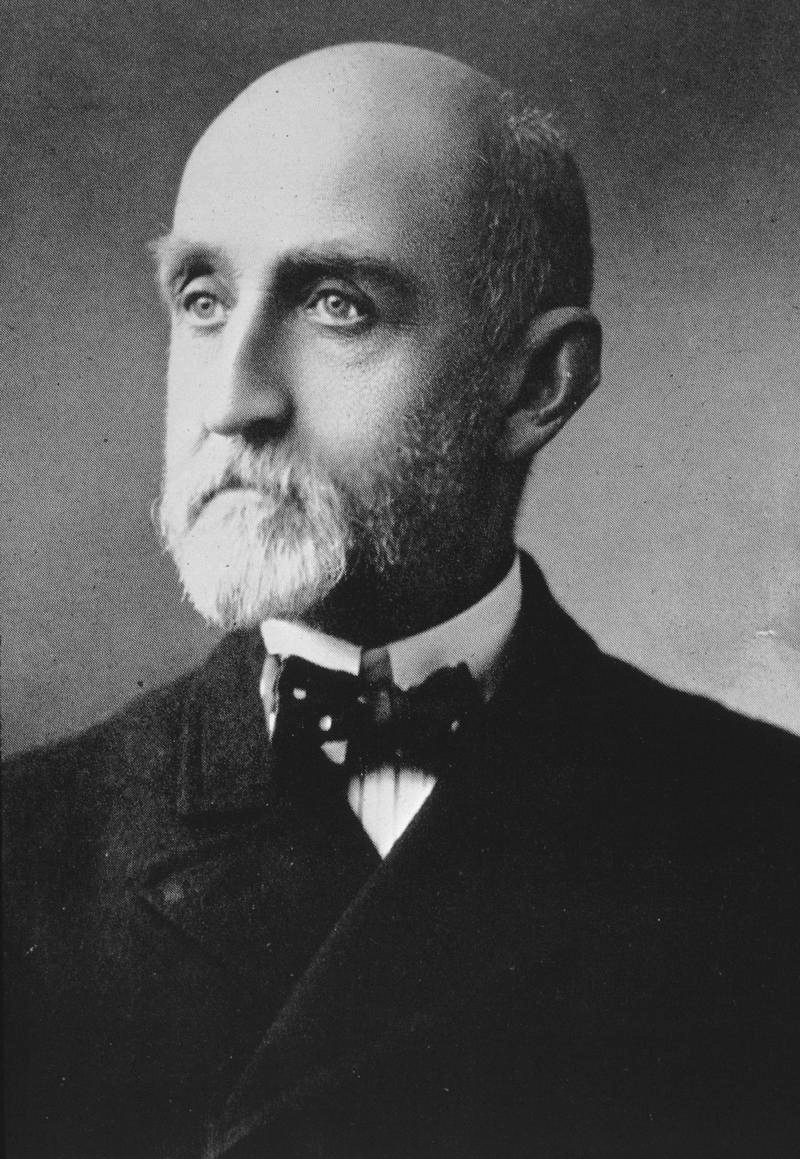
Rear-admiral Alfred Thayer Mahan, an American strategist and writer of The Influence of Sea Power upon History.

Timeliness contributed no small part to the widespread acceptance and resultant influence of Mahan's views. Although his history was relatively thin (he relied on secondary sources), the vigorous style and clear theory won widespread acceptance by navalists across the world. (Note: St. John argued that key European powers were already set to expand their navies and Mahan had crystallized their ideas by generating naval expansion support abroad.) Seapower supported the new colonialism that Europe and Japan were imposing on Africa and Asia. Given the very rapid technological changes underway in propulsion (from coal to oil, from reciprocating engines to steam turbines), ordnance (with better fire directors, and new high explosives) and armor (hardened steel), the emergence of new craft such as destroyers and submarines, and the development of radio, Mahan's emphasis on the capital ship and the command of the sea came at an opportune moment.

Daniel Immerwahr in How to Hide an Empire: A Short History of the Greater United States outlines that Mahan's greatest concern is with trade and how to secure shipping routes throughout the complex process of ports, coaling stations, restocking supplies, and naval protection. "Mahan warned that war might close the seas to the United States. Its ships would then be 'like land birds, unable to fly far from their own shores'".

=== 19th–20th century ===
==== British ====
Between 1890 and 1915, Mahan and British admiral Jacky Fisher faced the problem of how to dominate home waters and distant seas with naval forces not strong enough to do both. Mahan argued for a universal principle of concentration of powerful ships in home waters and minimized strength in distant seas, while Fisher reversed Mahan by utilizing technological change to propose submarines for defense of home waters and mobile battle cruisers for protection of distant imperial interests.

==== German ====
Mahan was initially introduced to the German navy by the strategist Ludwig Borckenhagen through a series of influential papers. Subsequently, his name became a household word in the German navy, as Kaiser Wilhelm II ordered his officers to read Mahan, and Admiral Alfred von Tirpitz used Mahan's reputation to build a powerful surface fleet.

==== French ====
The French at first adopted Mahan's theories. French naval doctrine in 1914 was dominated by Mahan's theory of sea power and therefore geared toward winning decisive battles and gaining mastery of the seas. But the course of World War I changed ideas about the place of the navy, as the refusal of the German fleet to engage in a decisive battle, the Dardanelles expedition of 1915, the development of submarine warfare, and the organization of convoys all showed the navy's new role in combined operations with the army.

The navy's part in securing victory was not fully understood by French public opinion in 1918, but a synthesis of old and new ideas arose from the lessons of the war, especially by admiral Raoul Castex, who from 1927 to 1935 synthesized in his five-volume Théories Stratégiques the classical and materialist schools of naval theory. He reversed Mahan's theory that command of the sea precedes maritime communications and foresaw the enlarged roles of aircraft and submarines in naval warfare. Castex enlarged strategic theory to include nonmilitary factors (policy, geography, coalitions, public opinion, and constraints) and internal factors (economy of force, offense and defense, communications, operational plans, morale, and command) to conceive a general strategy to attain final victory.

==== United States ====
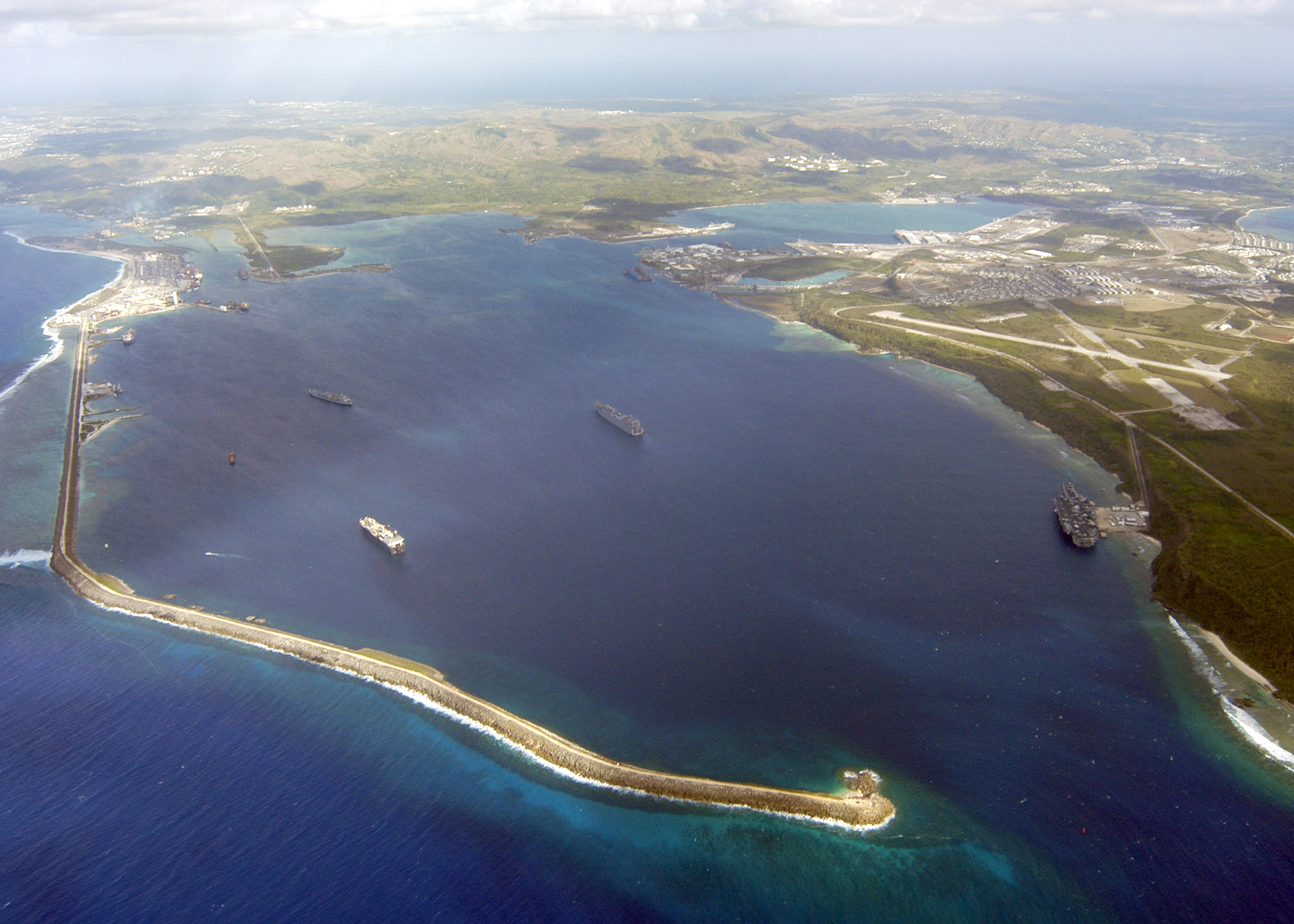
Aerial view of Guam's Apra Harbor and old airstrips.

At the time of Mahan's writing, the US relied on guano as a fertilizer and as a raw material in the production of gunpowder. With a Peruvian (and British) monopoly on guano across South American islands, this pushed the US into searching and securing alternative islands that fed into Mahan's goal of creating sea "highways" between land. To expedite this process, the US Congress had previously passed the Guano Islands Act 1856 to allow citizens to take unclaimed islands for the US and allow extraction of this resource. This is reflected in the historical and current insular territories of the United States.

American expansionism and imperialism was influenced through this book as Theodore Roosevelt wrote to Mahan: "during the last two days I have spent half my time, busy as I am, in reading your book ... I am greatly in error if it does not become a naval classic". There is noted influence on reading this book and Roosevelt's push to start expansionism with the Spanish-American War to secure resources and naval "highways" for ships across the Caribbean and Pacific – later influencing their ability to operate airstrips for World War I and World War II in places such as Guam.

=== 21st century ===
Mahan's strategic theories continue to be influential into the 21st century, especially in the newly emerging naval powers India and China.

== See also ==
- Alfred Thayer Mahan
- History of the Royal Navy (after 1707), British navy
- Naval warfare
- US Navy
