= Institut des hautes études de défense nationale =

- Type: Military college
- Established: 1936
- Location: Paris, France; 48.8525°N 2.3034°E
- Website: Site of the IHEDN

The Institut des hautes études de défense nationale (IHEDN, Institute of Advanced Studies in National Defence) is a French public academic institution for research, education and promotion of expertise and sensitization towards defence matters, founded in 1936 by Admiral Raoul Castex. Located in the École Militaire, this prestigious Institute is dedicated to train high-level military, government officials and high-ranking executives in defence matters. Some sessions are reserved for young auditors, generally students in the foremost grandes écoles, and under the age of 30. It is placed under the authority of the Prime Minister.

To the original national training sessions were added sessions in the regions (1954), international sessions (1980), economic intelligence cycles (1995), and other targeted seminars. In 1997 the Institute became a public administrative establishment placed under the authority of the Prime Minister. In 2010 it merged with the DGA's (Direction générale de l'armement) Centre des hautes études de l’armement (Centre for Higher Armament Studies (CHEAr)).

In 2010, the deputy director of the defense college was Robert Ranquet.
