= USS Mahan =

The name Mahan was assigned to the following four United States Navy ships, in honor of Rear Admiral Alfred Thayer Mahan, naval historian and theorist on sea power.

- USS Mahan (DD-102/DM-7): (DD-102) was a Wickes-class destroyer commissioned in 1918, and converted to the light minelayer DM-7 in 1920. She was decommissioned in 1930, and sold for scrap in 1931.
- USS Mahan (DD-364) was the lead ship of the Mahan-class destroyer; commissioned in 1936, disabled by Japanese aircraft and scuttled by friendly fire in 1944.
- USS Mahan (DLG-11/DDG-42): (DLG-11) was commissioned as a Farragut-class guided missile frigate in 1960, and reclassified as the guided missile destroyer (DDG-42) in 1975. She was decommissioned in 1993 and completely dismantled in 2004.
- USS Mahan (DDG-72) is an Arleigh Burke-class destroyer commissioned in 1998 and still in service
