= The Influence of Sea Power upon the French Revolution and Empire =

1892 book by Alfred Thayer Mahan

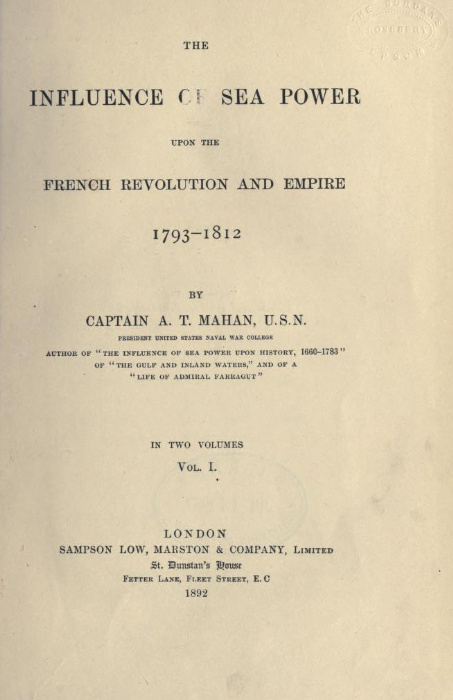
- Title page of the first edition of the first volume
- Author: Alfred Thayer Mahan
- Language: English
- Subject: Military history, military theory
- Genre: Non-fiction
- Published: 1892 (Little, Brown and Co.)
- Publication place: United States
- Media type: Print (hardback) 2 v. maps (1 fold.) plans, 23 cm.
- Pages: 380 (1st. ed., vol. 1), 428 (3rd ed., vol. 2)
- OCLC: 1105113
- Dewey Decimal: 359.03, 359.00944
- LC Class: DC153 .M216, V25.M343
- Preceded by: The Influence of Sea Power upon History (1890)
- Followed by: In The Interest of America in Sea Power, Present and Future (1897); The Life of Nelson, the Embodiment of the Sea Power of Great Britain (1897); Sea Power in its Relations to the War of 1812 (1905); The Major Operations of the Navies in the War of American Independence (1913)

The Influence of Sea Power upon the French Revolution and Empire: 1793–1812 is a history of naval warfare published in 1892 by the naval historian Rear Admiral (then-Captain) Alfred Thayer Mahan of the United States Navy. It is the direct successor to Mahan's enormously influential 1890 book, The Influence of Sea Power upon History: 1660–1783. It was published in two volumes. It details the role of sea power during the late eighteenth and early nineteenth centuries, with volume II concluding with the initial 1814 fall of Napoleon. It was followed by In The Interest of America in Sea Power, Present and Future (published 1897); The Life of Nelson, the Embodiment of the Sea Power of Great Britain (published 1897); Sea Power in its Relations to the War of 1812 (published 1905); and The Major Operations of the Navies in the War of American Independence (published 1913).

== Overview ==
Volume I focuses on the early stages of the French Revolution and the initial naval confrontations. Mahan examines the condition of the French and British navies in 1793, the strategic and political conditions of the time, and key naval battles such as the Glorious First of June 1794. Additionally, Mahan examines the broader implications of contemporary naval engagements in the West Indies and the Mediterranean, opining on the significance of sea power in maintaining 'empire.'

Volume II continues the narrative, covering major naval battles and campaigns from 1797 to 1812. Mahan discusses pivotal events such as the Battle of Cape St. Vincent, the Battle of the Nile, and the Battle of Trafalgar. He emphasized the inter-dependence of military branches, becoming an early proponent of inter-service cooperation, stressing the importance of navies to armies' logistics and transport, and the importance of armies (and marines or naval infantry) in striking-at and holding strategic points on land, including harbors and ports. As he did in his first book, Mahan would stress the more general military and commercial control of the sea, arguing that Britain's dominance at sea was crucial in countering French ambitions and ultimately leading to Napoleon's (first) downfall.

Mahan's work underscores the critical role of naval supremacy in determining the course of history, providing detailed accounts of naval strategies, battles, and their broader political and economic impacts. His analysis has had a lasting influence on naval doctrine and strategic thought, cementing his reputation as a foremost authority on maritime history.

== Table of contents ==
=== Volume 1 ===
- Preface
- Introductory: Outline of Events in Europe, 1783–1793
- Chapter I: The Condition of the Navies in 1793—And Especially of the French Navy
- Chapter II: The General Political and Strategic Conditions, and the Events of 1793
- Chapter III: The West Indies, 1793–1810
- Chapter IV: The Naval Campaign of May, 1794, and Battle of the First of June
- Chapter V: The Year 1794 in the Atlantic and on the Continent
- Chapter VI: The Year 1795 in the Atlantic and on the Continent
- Chapter VII: The Mediterranean and Italy—From the Evacuation of Toulon in 1793 to the British Withdrawal from that Sea, in 1796, and Battle of Cape St. Vincent, in February, 1797 — Austria Forced to Make Peace
- Chapter VIII: The Mediterranean in 1797 and 1798
- Chapter IX: The Mediterranean from 1799 to 1801
- Chapter X: The Atlantic, 1796–1801—The Brest Blockades—The French Expeditions Against Ireland

=== Volume 2 ===
- Preface
- Chapter I: Events in the Mediterranean and Atlantic, 1793–1796
- Chapter II: The Battle of Cape St. Vincent, 1797
- Chapter III: The Battle of Camperdown, 1797
- Chapter IV: The Battle of the Nile, 1798
- Chapter V: The Battle of Copenhagen, 1801
- Chapter VI: The Peace of Amiens, 1802–1803
- Chapter VII: The Renewal of War, 1803–1805
- Chapter VIII: The Trafalgar Campaign, 1805
- Chapter IX: The Continental System and the War of 1812
- Chapter X: The Campaign of 1813 and the Fall of Napoleon
- Chapter XI: Conclusion

== See also ==
- Alfred Thayer Mahan
- History of the British Royal Navy
- Naval warfare
- Military theory
- United States Navy
