= Dennis Hart Mahan =

American military academic and civil engineer (1802–1871)

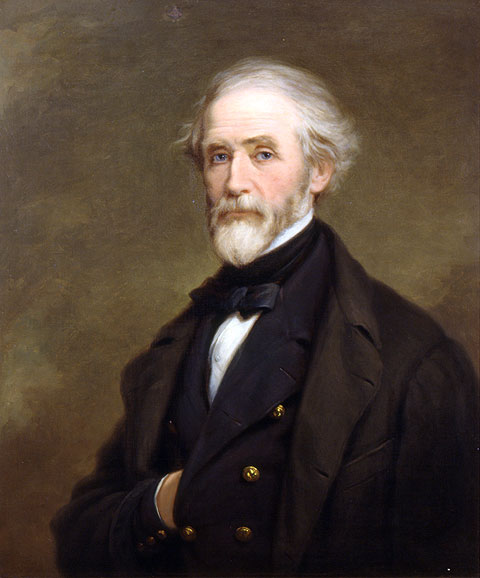
- Born: April 2, 1802; New York City, US
- Died: September 16, 1871 (aged 69) near Stony Point, New York, US
- Resting place: West Point Cemetery
- Education: United States Military Academy
- Occupations: Civil and military engineer Educator; Military theorist
- Spouse: Mary Helena Okill Mahan (m. 1839–1871, his death)
- Children: 6 (including Alfred Thayer Mahan)
- Military career
- Allegiance: United States
- Branch: United States Army
- Service years: 1824–1832
- Rank: Second Lieutenant
- Unit: United States Army Corps of Engineers

Dennis Hart Mahan (Mă-hăn) [məˈhæn] (April 2, 1802 – September 16, 1871) was an American military theorist, civil engineer and professor at the United States Military Academy at West Point from 1819 to 1871. He was the father of American naval historian and theorist Alfred Thayer Mahan.

A native of New York City, Mahan was raised and educated in Norfolk, Virginia. He was an 1824 graduate of the United States Military Academy; ranked first in class, Mahan's high academic standing earned him appointment to the United States Army Corps of Engineers. Mahan's mathematical and engineering skills were recognized by his instructors and the superintendent, Sylvanus Thayer, and he began teaching courses as an acting assistant professor during his third year as a student.

Mahan received advanced training in engineering during an extended trip to Europe, including attendance at the French engineer and artillery school in Metz. He resigned his commission in 1832 to become chairman of West Point's Engineering Department, and he remained on the faculty until his death. Mahan taught many of the military leaders who served on each side during the American Civil War, and his extensive writings on military engineering, fortifications, and strategy became required reading among military professionals through World War I.

In 1871, West Point's board of overseers recommended that he be retired because he was in ill health. On September 16, 1871, Mahan was aboard a Hudson River steamboat on his way to New York City to visit his doctor when he became distraught over the thought of retiring and committed suicide by jumping into the boat's paddlewheel. Mahan was buried at West Point Cemetery.

== Early life ==
Mahan was born in New York City on April 2, 1802, the son of Irish Catholic immigrants John Mahan and Mary (Cleary) Mahan. He was raised and educated in Norfolk, Virginia, and in 1820 received an appointment to the United States Military Academy from U.S. Representative Thomas Newton Jr. Mahan graduated in 1824, first in his class. His academic acumen was recognized while he was still a student, and in his third year at West Point superintendent Sylvanus Thayer appointed him acting assistant professor of mathematics. After graduation, he continued to serve on the faculty.

== Start of career ==
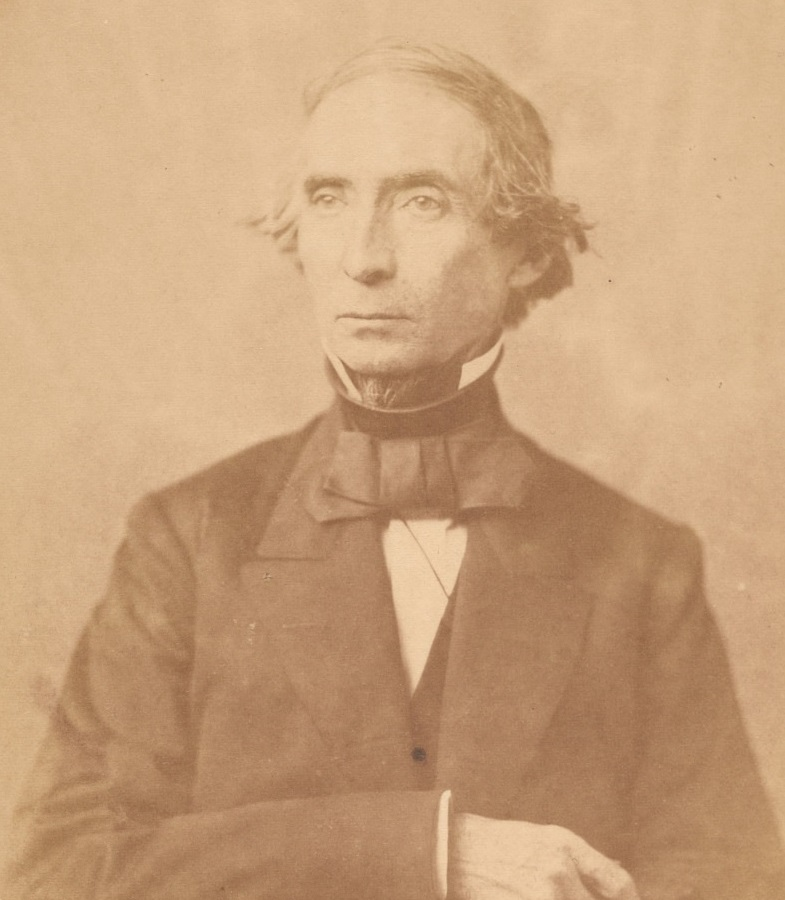
Mahan, salted paper photo, circa 1856

In 1826, Mahan went to Europe to study advanced engineering, and from 1829 to 1830 he was a student at France's school of engineers and artillery in Metz. Upon returning to West Point in 1830, he was promoted to professor of civil and military Engineering. He resigned his second lieutenant's commission in 1832 to become chairman of West Point's Engineering Department, and he remained on the faculty until his death. Mahan was subsequently appointed dean of the faculty and became a recognized authority on engineering. In addition to becoming a member of several scientific and professional societies, he also carried out special appointments that took advantage of his technical skills. In 1828, he was elected to membership in France's Société de Géographie. In 1850, Governor John B. Floyd of Virginia appointed Mahan to the board that recommended a route for the Baltimore and Ohio Railroad to run from Cumberland, Maryland to a terminus in Wheeling, West Virginia, which was then part of Virginia. In 1863, Mahan was an original incorporator of the National Academy of Sciences. In 1871, he was appointed to the board of overseers for the Thayer School of Engineering at Dartmouth College.

Mahan founded the Napoleon Club at West Point. In the club's seminars, which reviewed the engagements of the Napoleonic Wars, advanced undergraduates studied and discussed the great European battles, including the campaigns of Napoleon and Frederick the Great. Participants included Robert E. Lee, John F. Reynolds, George Henry Thomas and George B. McClellan. As an author, Mahan promoted military professionalism and wrote extensively on strategy and tactics, fixed fortifications, and field fortifications. His writings became standard textbooks for the armies of several countries, and remained required reading from the time they were written until after World War II.

== Continued career ==
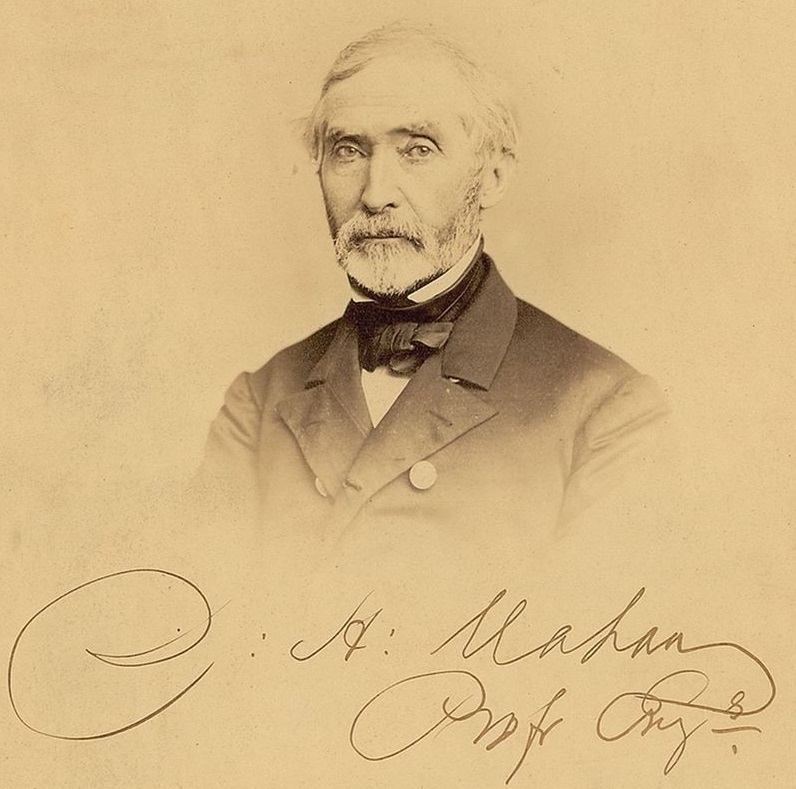
Mahan in an autographed cabinet photo, circa 1870

Mahan was largely responsible for disseminating ideas of European military theorists throughout the United States, particularly Antoine-Henri Jomini, and his lectures and writings were instrumental to U.S. actions in every conflict from the Mexican–American War and American Civil War to World War I and World War II. A proponent of a disciplined professional army in an era when the United States relied on a small standing army augmented with minimally trained volunteers and militia, Mahan strongly advocated providing discipline and training for militia and volunteers as a means of improving their performance on the battlefield.

The theories Mahan advocated included the use of combined arms to defeat an enemy, rather than relying on infantry with the other arms only in support. In his writings, Mahan emphasized the use of artillery, infantry, and cavalry in concert to attack the enemy’s decisive point. A cautious man by nature, he taught the tactical offensive, but not in an unqualified manner. "Great prudence must be shown in advancing, as the troops engaged are liable at any moment to an attack on their flank", he wrote. He advocated a practical, flexible approach to military operations, blending French doctrine from the battles of the French Revolution and Napoleonic Wars as espoused by Jomini with the realities of warfare in North America, especially the differences between European and American geography and terrain. As a strategist, Mahan advocated for bold measures in battle rather than limited warfare, believing that once a country committed its military to war, the object was to gain an advantageous peace, which could be done only by decisive action.

== Death and burial ==
In his later years, Mahan began to suffer from ill health, which negatively affected his ability to teach. As a result, in 1871, the West Point Board of Visitors recommended that he retire. On September 16, 1871, Mahan began a Hudson River steamboat trip to New York City, where he intended to consult with his doctor. Increasingly distraught at the prospect of retirement, he committed suicide by leaping into the boat's paddlewheel. He was buried at West Point Cemetery.

== Honors and awards ==
In 1837, Mahan received the honorary degree of Master of Arts from Brown University and Princeton University. He received honorary Legum Doctor (LL.D.) degrees from the College of William & Mary and Brown University in 1852, and from Dartmouth College in 1867.

Fort Mahan Park, in northeast Washington, D.C. was originally Fort Mahan, a Civil War defensive work named for Mahan. Built in 1861, Fort Mahan was constructed in order to provide defense of the Benning's Bridge entry to the city. The site of Fort Mahan is now part of the National Park Service's Civil War Defenses of Washington, and is located at Benning Road and 42nd Street, NE.

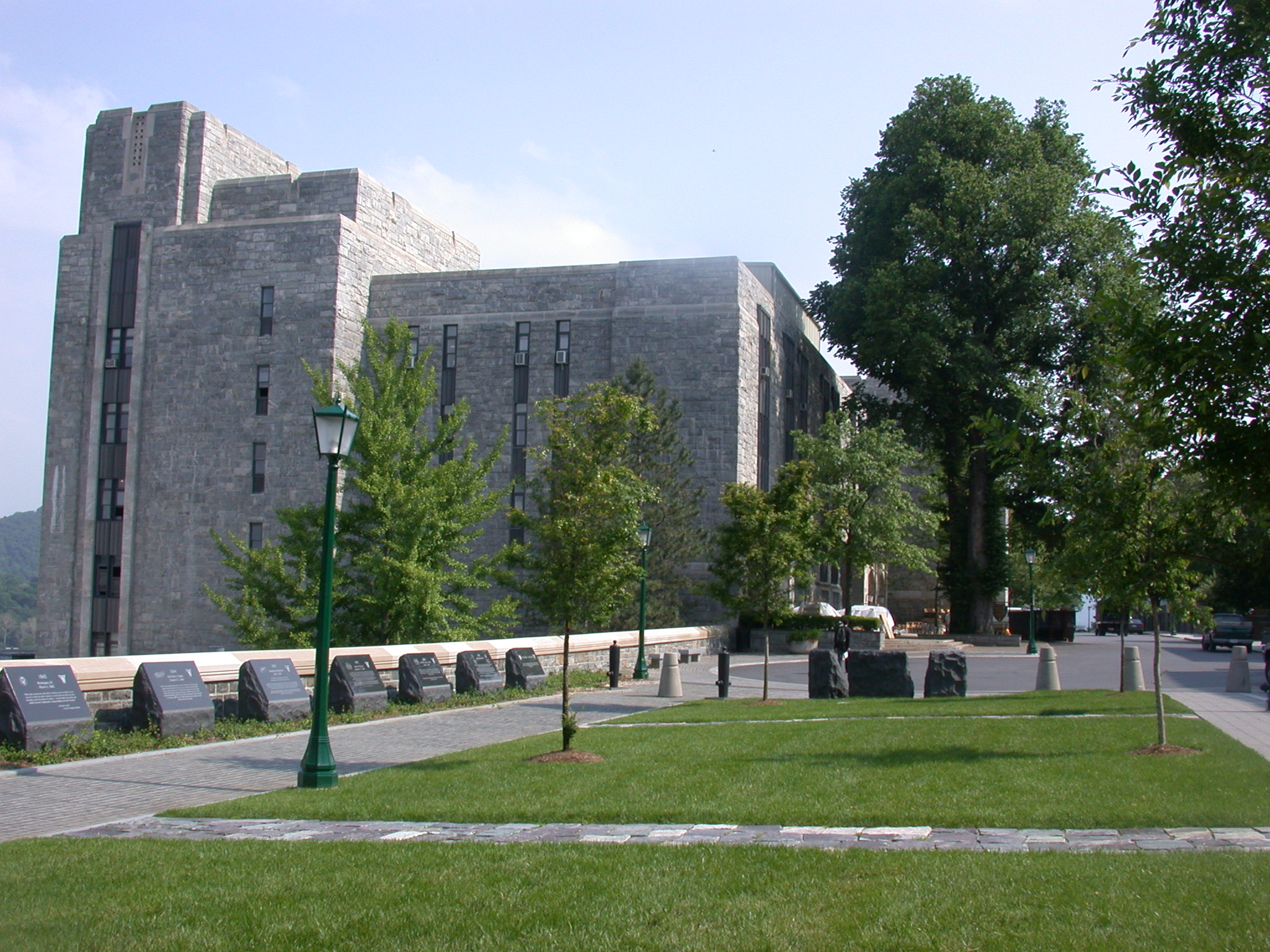
Mahan Hall, United States Military Academy, 2003

Mahan Hall at the United States Military Academy at West Point was named in his honor. Built in 1971, it houses the Academy's Departments of Civil & Mechanical Engineering (CME) and Systems Engineering.

== Family ==
In 1839, Mahan married Mary Helena Okill. They were married until his death and were the parents of six children.

- Alfred Thayer Mahan (1840–1914)
- Mary Mahan (1842–1891)
- Helen Candace Mahan (1843–1846)
- Frederick Augustus Mahan (1847–1918)
- Dennis Hart Mahan (1849–1925)
- Jane Leigh Mahan (1852–1945)

== Books by Mahan ==
Mahan's published works included:

- A Treatise on Field Fortification (1836)
- Elementary Course of Civil Engineering (1837; revised 1868)
- Elementary Treatise on Advanced-Guard, Out-posts, and Detachment Service of Troops, and the Manner of Posting and Handling Them in Presence of an Enemy (colloquially known as "Out-posts", 1847; revised, 1862)
- Summary on the Cause of Permanent Fortifications and of the Attack and Defense of Permanent Works (1850)
- Elementary Treatise on Industrial Drawing (1853)
- Editor, with additions, the American edition of Mosely's Mechanical Principles of Engineering and Architecture (1856)
- Descriptive Geometry, as applied to the Drawing of Fortifications and Stereometry (1864)
- An Elementary Course on Military Engineering Field Fortifications, Military Mining, and Siege Operations (1865)
- Permanent Fortifications (1867)
