= Raoul Castex =

French naval historian (1878–1968)

Raoul Victor Patrice Castex (27 October 1878, Saint-Omer – 10 January 1968, Villeneuve-de-Rivière) was a French Navy admiral and a military theorist.

== Naval career ==
Castex joined the Navy in 1896, becoming the best student of his promotion at the École Navale. He became professor at the École de Guerre Navale. In 1919, he was tasked with reorganising the historical services of the French Navy, and in 1928, he was promoted to contre-amiral.

On 2 July 1936, he was made a grand officer of the Legion of Honour. The same year, he founded the Institut des hautes études de la défense nationale, which he headed until 1939. He rose to vice-amiral in 1937 and finished his career heading the naval forces of the Northern fleet.

== Institut des Hautes Études de la Défense Nationale ==
One of his main achievements was the creation of the Institut des Hautes Études de la Défense Nationale (IHEDN, Institute of Higher Studies of National Defence), which aimed to reduce the intellectual gap between civilian and military officials.

== Theories ==
Between 1929 and 1939, Castex wrote Théories stratégiques, which analysed the link between land and naval warfare and argued for a national "gravity centre", which, in the case of France, would be situated outside Europe. He argued that the "gravity centre" should have been displaced to Northern Africa before 1939, with installation of main armament factories and government centres.

In 1939, Castex suggested granting independence to French Indochina, which he deemed indefensible against the Japanese Empire, and to Syria and Lebanon, which were then under French mandate, to make allies out of them.

In 1955, Castex published an article in the Revue de la défense nationale ("Review of National Defence"), La Russie, rempart de l'Occident ("Russia, Wall of the West"). There, he seemed to predict the rise of China and its upcoming rivalry with the West, including Russia.

== Works ==
- Strategic Theories (Naval Institute Press, 2017), Eugenia Kiesling translates and summarizes Castex's original five volume study, Théories stratégiques ISBN 1-68247-278-7
- Le Grand État-major naval, question militaire d'actualité (1909)
- Les Idées militaires de la marine du XVIIIe. De Ruyter à Suffren (1911)
- L'Envers de la guerre de course. La vérité sur l'enlèvement du convoi de St-Eustache par Lamotte-Picquet (avril-mai 1781) (1912)
- Synthèse de la guerre sous-marine. De Pontchartrain à Tirpitz (1920)
- Questions d'état-major. Principes. Organisation. Fonctionnement (1923–1924)
- Théories stratégiques (5 vol 1929; 1935). Reedited in 1995 by Economica.
- De Gengis-Khan à Staline ou les Vicissitudes d'une manœuvre stratégique, 1205-1935 (1935)

== Bibliography ==
- Amiral Douguet, le Contre-Amiral Duval et le Général Guillebon, Hommage à l'amiral Raoul Castex, Académie de Marine, Paris, 1968
- Hervé Coutau-Bégarie, Castex, le stratège inconnu, Economica 1985
