= Halloween Massacre =

The Halloween Massacre refers to one of several political events:

- Halloween massacre (Angola), an armed conflict in Angola in 1992
- Halloween Massacre (Ford administration), a reorganization in the Ford Administration in the US
- Halloween Massacre of 1977, a purge of high-ranking US Central Intelligence Agency officers by Admiral Stansfield Turner
