= Benedict Semmes =

Benedict Semmes or Benedict J. Semmes may refer to:

- Benedict Joseph Semmes (1789–1863), American politician
- Benedict J. Semmes Jr. (1913–1994), American admiral
