= Stansfield Turner =

Admiral and CIA director (1923–2018)

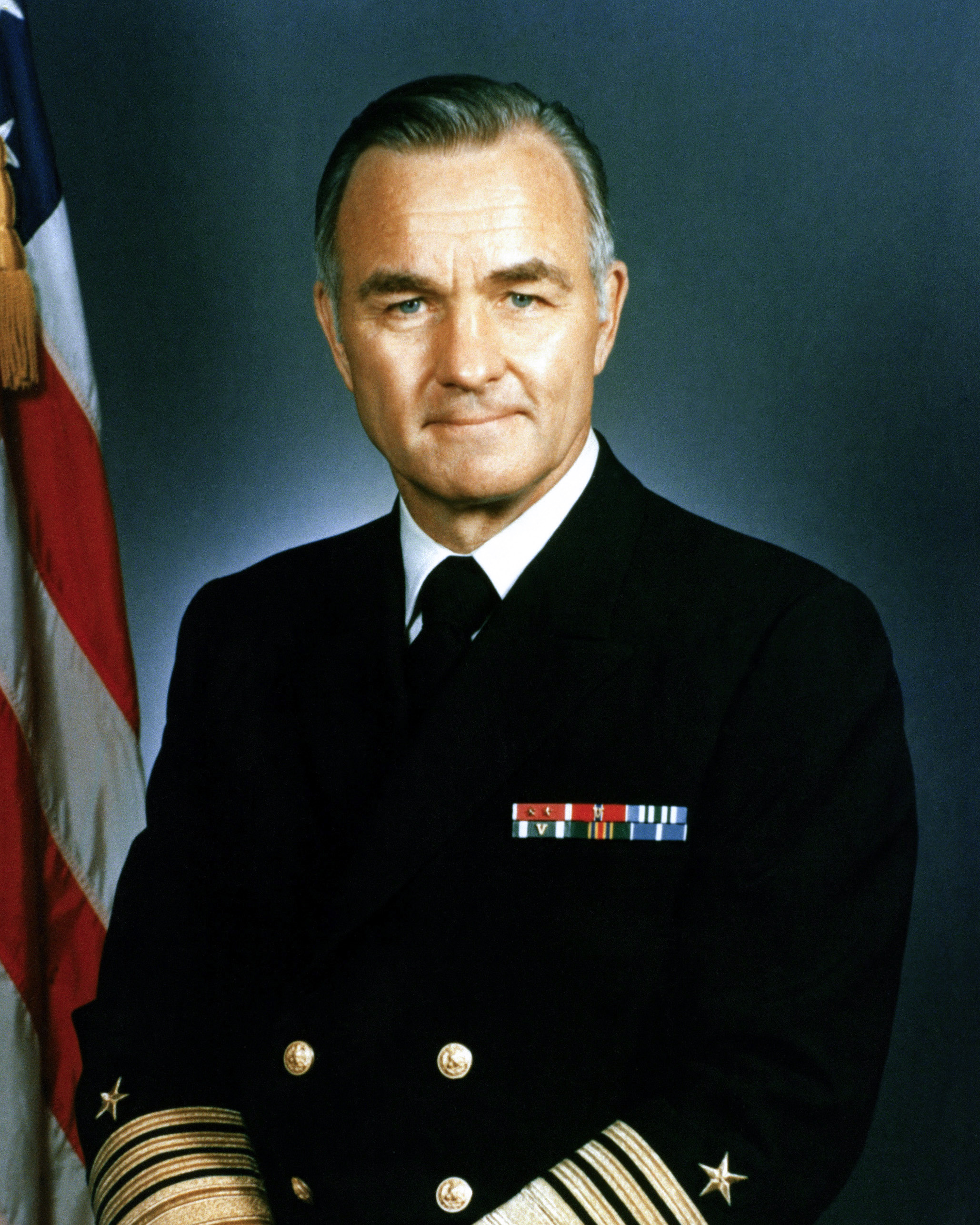
- Official portrait, 1983

12th Director of Central Intelligence
- In office March 9, 1977 – January 20, 1981
- President: Jimmy Carter
- Deputy: E. Henry Knoche; John F. Blake; Frank Carlucci
- Preceded by: George H. W. Bush
- Succeeded by: William J. Casey

37th President of the Naval War College
- In office June 30, 1972 – August 9, 1974
- Preceded by: Benedict J. Semmes Jr.
- Succeeded by: Julien LeBourgeois

Personal details
- Born: December 1, 1923 Highland Park, Illinois, U.S.
- Died: January 18, 2018 (aged 94) Redmond, Washington, U.S.
- Resting place: United States Naval Academy Cemetery
- Spouses: Patricia Busby Whitney (m. 1953; div. 1984) Eli Karin Tjelta (m. 1985; died 2000) Marion Levitt Weiss (m. 2002)
- Children: 2
- Education: United States Naval Academy (BS); Exeter College, Oxford (BA)

Military service
- Allegiance: United States
- Branch/service: United States Navy
- Years of service: 1946–1978
- Rank: Admiral
- Commands: USS Conquest; USS Rowan; USS Horne; U.S. Second Fleet; Allied Forces Southern Europe
- Battles/wars: World War II; Korean War; Vietnam War

Stansfield Turner (December 1, 1923 – January 18, 2018) was an admiral in the United States Navy who served as President of the Naval War College (1972–1974), commander of the United States Second Fleet (1974–1975), and Supreme Allied Commander NATO Southern Europe (1975–1977), and was Director of Central Intelligence (1977–1981) in the Carter administration. A graduate of Exeter College, Oxford and the United States Naval Academy, Turner served for more than 30 years in the Navy, commanding warships, a carrier group, and NATO's military forces in southern Europe, among other commands.

Turner was appointed to lead the CIA by Jimmy Carter in 1977 and undertook a series of controversial reforms, including downsizing the Agency's clandestine arm and emphasizing technical intelligence collection over human intelligence. He also oversaw the CIA's responses to the Iranian Revolution and the Soviet–Afghan War. After leaving the CIA in 1981, Turner entered the private sector, authored several books, and criticized subsequent administrations, including the Bush administration's handling of the Iraq War. He was a senior research scholar at the University of Maryland, College Park's School of Public Policy.

== Early life and education ==
Turner was born in the Chicago suburb of Highland Park, Illinois, on December 1, 1923, to Oliver Stansfield Turner, a real estate broker, and Wilhelmina Josephine Wagner. Turner was life-long Christian Scientist having been raised in a Christian Science family. He remained a devout member of The Christian Science Mother Church in Boston, Massachusetts, as well as several Christian Science branch churches where he taught in the Sunday School. He graduated from Highland Park High School in 1941 before attending Amherst College until 1943. After joining the United States Naval Reserve, he received an appointment to the United States Naval Academy in 1943 as a member of the Class of 1947. While at Annapolis, he participated in the Navy Midshipmen football program as a guard. Although Turner and fellow transfer student Jimmy Carter were in the same class at the Academy, he received his undergraduate degree in electrical engineering and attained a commission in the United States Navy in June 1946 as part of an accelerated three-year curriculum, the result of World War II. He was a Rhodes Scholar at Exeter College, Oxford while serving in the Navy, graduating with a degree in Philosophy, Politics and Economics in 1950, which was promoted to an MA per tradition. In 1966, he attended the six-week Advanced Management Program at Harvard Business School.

== Military career ==
Upon commissioning as a naval officer, Turner served briefly aboard the escort carrier USS Palau and the light cruiser USS Dayton. After a brief leave of absence to attend Oxford, Turner returned to navy service and served as a gunnery officer aboard the destroyer USS Stribling and then the operations officer aboard the USS Hanson, taking part in shore bombardments in the closing months of the Korean War. From 1956 to 1958, he served as commanding officer of the ocean mine sweeper (MSO), USS Conquest, and later executive officer of the destroyer USS Morton (DD-948) in 1961 and 1962. Turner then served as commanding officer of the destroyer USS Rowan and the guided missile cruiser USS Horne (DLG-30), where he participated in combat operations off the coast of Vietnam.

He commanded Cruiser-Destroyer Flotilla 8 as a rear admiral, leading a task group in 1970–1971 consisting of the aircraft carriers Independence and John F. Kennedy monitoring the Soviet Fifth Eskadra in the Mediterranean. He then served as Director, Systems Analysis Division, Office of the Chief of Naval Operations (1971–1972); President of the Naval War College (1972–1974); and Commander, United States Second Fleet, Naval Station Norfolk (1974–1975). After being promoted to admiral in 1975, Turner became NATO Commander-in-Chief, Allied Forces Southern Europe, Naples where he served until his appointment to the CIA in 1977. Turner retired from active Navy duty on December 31, 1978.

== Career ==
=== Central Intelligence Agency ===
In February 1977, President Jimmy Carter nominated Turner as Director of Central Intelligence, after Ted Sorensen's nomination was withdrawn due to his background as a conscientious objector and allegations of mishandling classified documents. After two days of hearings, Turner was unanimously confirmed to lead the Agency.

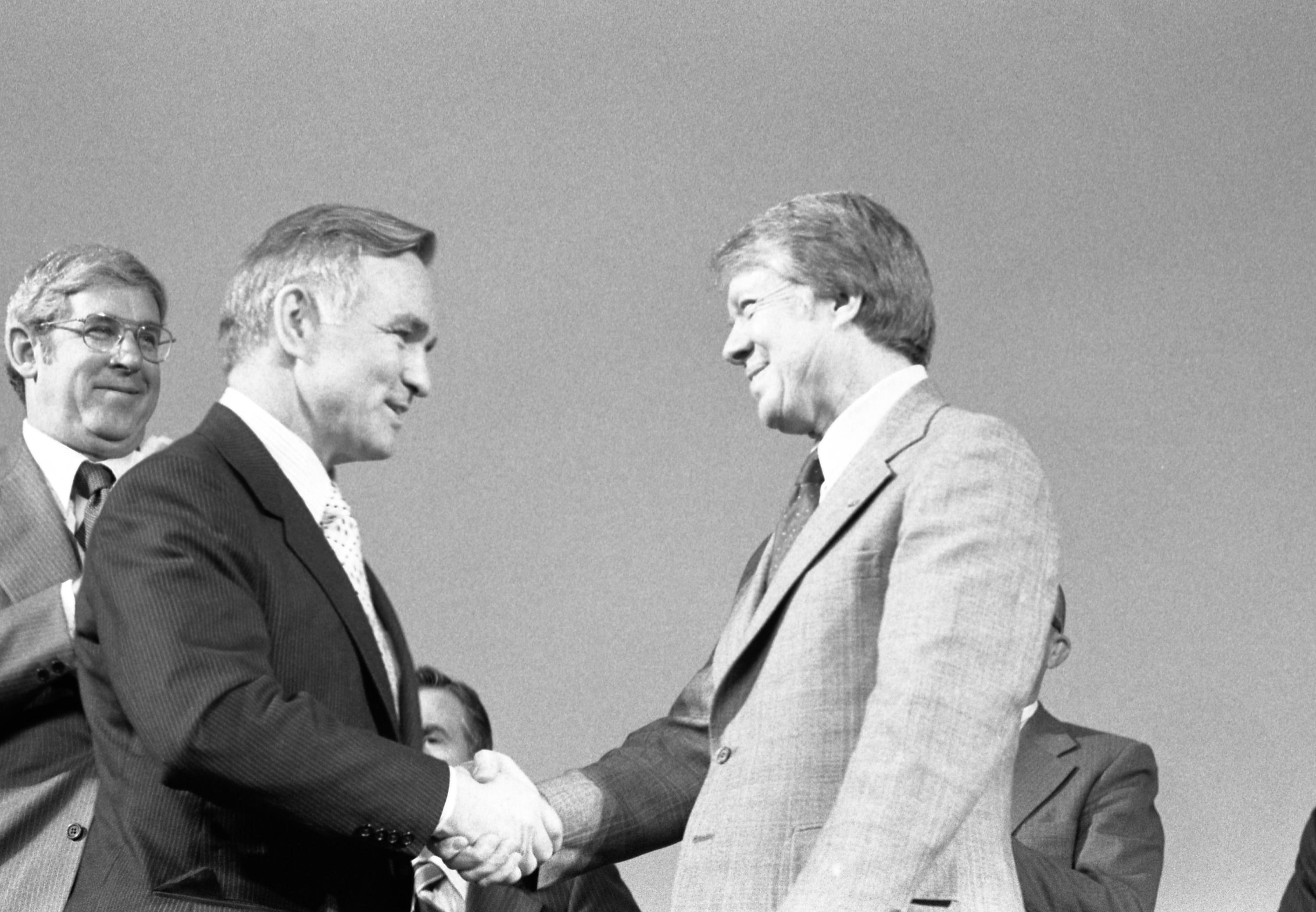
Turner shaking hands with President Carter after being sworn in

President Carter wanted reforms on the intelligence agencies, whose reputations were discredited due to the Watergate scandal (Church Commission), and other controversies that involved spying on citizens, against the antiwar movement and other dissident groups in the United States, and international assassination plots (Human rights violations by the CIA). Turner sought to revamp the Agency in several ways, first appointing several high-ranking naval officers, known as the "Navy mafia", to leadership positions and also by fundamentally altering the Agency's traditional methods of intelligence collection. Under Turner's direction, the CIA emphasized technical intelligence (TECHINT) and signals intelligence (SIGINT) over human intelligence (HUMINT). In October 1977, Turner eliminated over 800 operational positions, most of them in the clandestine service, in what was dubbed the Halloween Massacre. In a memoir published in 2005, Turner expressed regret for the dismissals stating, "In retrospect, I probably should not have effected the reductions of 820 positions at all, and certainly not the last 17." The reductions applied to Vietnam-era personnel according to later-era employee and novelist Jason Matthews. Turner also oversaw the beginning of Operation Cyclone, the CIA's program to arm Afghan guerrillas in their fight against the Soviet Union.

During Turner's term as head of the CIA, he became outraged when former employee Frank Snepp published a book called Decent Interval which exposed incompetence among senior U.S. government personnel during the fall of Saigon. Turner accused Snepp of breaking the secrecy agreement required of all CIA employees, and then later was forced to admit under cross-examination that he had never read the agreement signed by Snepp. Regardless, the CIA ultimately won its case against Snepp at the Supreme Court of the United States. The Court forced Snepp to turn over all his profits from Decent Interval and to seek preclearance of any future writings about intelligence work for the rest of his life. Ironically, the CIA would later rely on the Snepp legal precedent to force Turner to seek preclearance of his own memoirs, which were highly critical of President Ronald Reagan's policies.

On March 12, 1980, President Jimmy Carter and Turner presented Tony Mendez with the CIA's Intelligence Star for his role in the exfiltration of six U.S. State Department personnel from Iran on January 28, 1980.

=== Post-CIA activities ===
Upon leaving the agency, Turner became a lecturer, author, and TV commentator, and served on the boards of several American corporations, including Monsanto (1981–1991) and the National Life Group (1985–1992). Turner served as a member of the University of Rhode Island Graduate School of Oceanography's Marine Advisory Council and the United States Naval Academy's Board of Visitors. He also wrote several books, including Secrecy and Democracy – The CIA in Transition (1985), Terrorism and Democracy (1991), Caging the Nuclear Genie – An American Challenge for Global Security (1997; revised edition, 1999), and 2005's Burn Before Reading: Presidents, CIA Directors, and Secret Intelligence, in which he advocated fragmenting the CIA.

Turner was sharply critical of the Bush administration's handling of the 2003 invasion of Iraq. In September 2003 he wrote that "most of the assumptions behind our invasion have been proven wrong: The intelligence did not support the imminence of a threat, the Iraqis have not broadly welcomed us as liberators, the idea that we could manage this action almost unilaterally is giving way to pleas for troops and money from other nations, the aversion to giving the U.N. a meaningful role is eroding daily, and the reluctance to get involved in nation building is being supplanted by just that." In 2004, Turner was among 27 retired diplomats and military commanders who publicly said the administration of President Bush did not understand the world and was unable to handle "in either style or substance" the responsibilities of global leadership.

In November 2005, after Vice President Dick Cheney lobbied against a provision to a defense bill that Republican Senator John McCain passed in the Senate banning "cruel, inhuman or degrading treatment" of all U.S. detainees, Turner was quoted as saying, "I am embarrassed that the USA has a vice president for torture. I think it is just reprehensible. He [Dick Cheney] advocates torture, what else is it? I just don't understand how a man in that position can take such a stance." Cheney countered the bill that went well beyond banning torture and could be interpreted by courts to ban most forms of interrogation.

Turner served on the Military Advisors Committee for the Business Leaders for Sensible Priorities, whose mission was to reduce the amount of the discretionary budget going to the military by 15 percent and reallocate that money to education, healthcare, renewable energies, job training, and humanitarian aid programs.

== Personal life and death ==
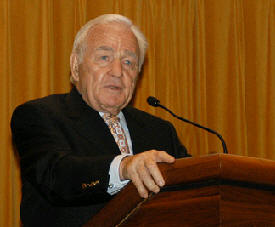
Turner in November 2005

Turner married Patricia Busby Whitney (September 25, 1923 – June 12, 2013) on December 23, 1953. The couple had two children, Laurel and Geoffrey. The marriage ended in divorce in 1984. Turner then married Norwegian-born Eli Karin Gilbert (née Tjelta) in 1985. On January 15, 2000, Turner survived a plane crash, although seriously injured, in Costa Rica that killed his wife and three other people on board. Turner and his wife were on the L-410 Turbolet operated by Taxi Aereo Centroamericano, on a flight from the small airport of Tobías Bolaños International Airport in San José, destined toward Tortuguero. Three minutes after take-off the airplane crashed into a house. The cause of the crash was unknown. Turner later married Marion Levitt Weiss in 2002.

Turner died at his home in Redmond, Washington on January 18, 2018, at age 94.

== Awards and honors ==
Turner was an Honorary fellow of his University of Oxford alma mater, Exeter College, where he studied as a Rhodes Scholar.

Turner was inducted as a Laureate of The Lincoln Academy of Illinois and awarded the Order of Lincoln (the State's highest honor) by the Governor George Ryan in 1999 in the area of Government.

Turner received the Golden Plate Award of the American Academy of Achievement in 1978.

=== Medals and ribbons ===

1st Row	Navy Distinguished Service Medal	Legion of Merit with two gold stars	Bronze Star with Combat "V"	
2nd Row	Joint Service Commendation Medal	Navy and Marine Corps Commendation Medal with Combat "V"	Navy Meritorious Unit Commendation	China Service Medal
3rd Row	American Campaign Medal	World War II Victory Medal	Navy Occupation Service Medal	National Defense Service Medal with one bronze star
4th Row	Korean Service Medal with two bronze stars	Armed Forces Expeditionary Medal	Korean Presidential Unit Citation	United Nations Service Medal

== In popular culture ==
- Turner is mentioned in the film Charlie Wilson's War by the character Gust Avrakotos as played by Philip Seymour Hoffman.
- Turner is played by Philip Baker Hall in the movie Argo.
- A fictionalized version of Turner, called "Stanley", is played by Rob Delaney in the Peacock series Ponies.

== Selected publications ==
- Secrecy and Democracy: The CIA in Transition. Boston: Houghton Mifflin, 1985. ISBN 978-0395355732.
- Terrorism and Democracy. Boston: Houghton Mifflin, 1991. ISBN 978-0395430866.
- Caging the Nuclear Genie: An American Challenge for Global Security. Boulder, Colo.: Westview Press, 1997. ISBN 978-0813333281.
  - Updated edition: Caging the Genies: A Workable Solution for Nuclear, Chemical, and Biological Weapons. Boulder, Colo.: Westview Press, 1999. ISBN 978-0813366777.
- Burn Before Reading. New York: Hyperion Books, 2005. ISBN 978-0786867820.

Academic offices
Preceded by Benedict Semmes	President of the Naval War College; 1972–1974	Succeeded by Julien LeBourgeois
Government offices
Preceded by George H. W. Bush	Director of Central Intelligence; 1977–1981	Succeeded by William Casey
