= Julien J. LeBourgeois =

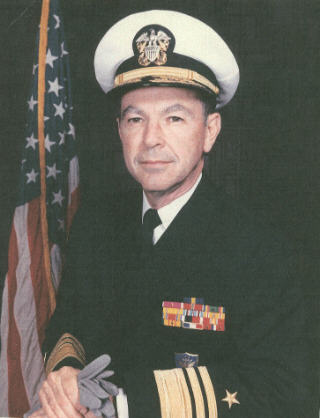
- Born: 23 November 1923; Southern Pines, North Carolina, U.S.
- Died: 16 September 2012 (aged 88); Williamsburg, Virginia, U.S.
- Burial place: United States Naval Academy Cemetery
- Military career
- Allegiance: United States
- Branch: United States Navy
- Service years: 1944–1977
- Rank: Vice Admiral
- Commands: Naval War College; Southern Anti-Air/Search and Rescue Element; USS Halsey (DLG-23); USS Norris (DD-859)
- Conflicts: World War II: Pacific War; Palau campaign; Battle of Peleliu; Leyte campaign; Battle of Surigao Strait; Battle of Mindoro; Invasion of Lingayen Gulf; Battle of Balikpapan; Vietnam War
- Awards: Navy Distinguished Service Medal (2); Legion of Merit (2); Bronze Star Medal with Combat "V"

Julien Johnson LeBourgeois (23 November 1923 – 16 September 2012) was a vice admiral of the United States Navy. His career included service in World War II, the Cold War, and the Vietnam War, duty aboard and command of cruisers and destroyers, various planning and staff assignments, and a tour as President of the Naval War College.

== Early life ==
LeBourgeois was born in Southern Pines, North Carolina, on 23 November 1923, the son of U.S. Navy Commander Henry Blow LeBourgeois and Dorothy Johnson LeBourgeois. He was raised in Long Beach, California, and Suva, American Samoa, and attended the Georgia Military Academy in College Park, Georgia. He entered the United States Naval Academy in 1941, where he was a member of the track team, and graduated in 1944 after only three years due to the accelerated curriculum in use during World War II.

== Naval career ==
=== World War II ===
LeBourgeois' first assignment was as a gunnery officer aboard the light cruiser USS Columbia (CL-56), then in combat against the Japanese in the Pacific. Aboard Columbia he saw action in the Palau campaign, including the Battle of Peleliu, and in the Leyte campaign, during which Columbia fought in the Battle of Surigao Strait, a part of the Battle of Leyte Gulf. Columbia also supported the invasion of Mindoro and took part in the invasion of Lingayen Gulf on Luzon, during which three kamikazes struck Columbia and for which the ship was awarded a Presidential Unit Citation. After that, Columbia operated in support of the invasion of Balikpapan and took part in the 1945 anti-shipping sweep in the South China Sea.

=== 1946–1965 ===
LeBourgeois remained aboard Columbia through the end of World War II and for an additional year beyond, leaving her in August 1946 to report for duty as gunnery officer and first lieutenant aboard the destroyer escort USS Harveson (DE-316). In June 1947 he transferred to the destroyer USS Brownson (DD-868) and served as her gunnery officer, first lieutenant, and damage control officer over the next two years.

Beginning in July 1949, LeBourgeois attended first the Naval Intelligence School and then the Naval Language School in Washington, D.C., becoming a qualified interpreter and translator in the French language. He then served in the Office of Naval Intelligence's Counterintelligence Division from June 1950 to July 1951 before moving on to Tangier, Morocco, where he was the assistant naval attaché at the American Legation. In October 1953, LeBourgeois was appointed a communications officer on the staff of Commander, Destroyer Flotilla 4. In August 1955, he moved to the Current Intelligence Branch of the Joint Staff in the Office of the Joint Chiefs of Staff.

In September 1957, LeBourgeois began his next sea tour, joining the pre-commissioning detail of the new destroyer USS Blandy (DD-943). When Blandy was commissioned on 26 November 1957, he became her first executive officer. During his tour, which lasted until January 1959, Blandy operated in the Atlantic and Mediterranean and, in 1958, transported the Unknown Soldiers of World War II and the Korean War to Washington, D.C., for final interment in the Tomb of the Unknowns in Arlington National Cemetery in Arlington, Virginia.

After leaving Blandy, LeBourgeois attended the Armed Forces Staff College in Norfolk, Virginia, before becoming commanding officer of the destroyer USS Norris (DD-859) on 28 July 1959. While he was in command, Norris had the highest competitive score overall for destroyers in the United States Atlantic Fleet for the fiscal year 1961 and received the Battle Efficiency Award twice.

LeBourgeois relinquished command of Norris on 3 April 1961 and joined the staff of Commander, Destroyer Force, Atlantic Fleet, where he led a team of officers who prepared the first curriculum for the Destroyer School. He then attended the Industrial College of the Armed Forces in Washington, D.C., from July 1961 to June 1962. After completing his studies, he was assigned to the Strategic Plans Division of the Office of the Chief of Naval Operations, earning a Master's degree in International Affairs from George Washington University in 1963 during his tour. From December 1962 to June 1965, he was executive assistant and senior aide to the Deputy Chief of Naval Operations (Plans and Policy). He received the Legion of Merit for this appointment.

=== Vietnam War ===
In September 1965, LeBourgeois took command of the guided-missile frigate (later reclassified as a guided-missile cruiser) USS Halsey (DLG-23) (later CG-23). Under his command, Halsey deployed off Vietnam in 1966 during the Vietnam War. During her deployment, LeBourgeois also served as Commander, Southern Anti-Air/Search and Rescue Element in the Gulf of Tonkin, where forces under his command rescued 17 airmen shot down over North Vietnam. In one such rescue, LeBourgeois was instrumental in the saving of Colonel Victor Vizcarra, by ordering his ship to flank speed (approximately 42 knots) to reduce the distance between USS Halsey and the rescue helicopter that was dangerously low on fuel. He received the Bronze Star Medal with Combat Distinguishing Device. For the same period, Halsey was awarded the Navy Unit Commendation. Halsey also was awarded the Battle Efficiency Award for its performance under LeBourgeois' command during 1966.

=== 1967–1977 ===
In July 1967, LeBourgeois left Halsey for an assignment in the Systems Analysis Division in the Office of the Chief of Naval Operations. In April 1968 he became executive assistant and senior aide to the Chief of Naval Operations. He received a second award of the Legion of Merit for his service in this post.

In January 1970, LeBourgeois, newly promoted to rear admiral, became Deputy Assistant Chief of Staff (Plans and Policy) on the North Atlantic Treaty Organization (NATO) staff of the Supreme Allied Commander Europe (SACEUR) in Casteau, Belgium. He received the Navy Distinguished Service Medal for his performance in this role. In May 1972, LeBourgeois was promoted to vice admiral and began an assignment as chief of staff to the NATO Supreme Allied Commander Atlanticin Norfolk, Virginia.

On 9 August 1974, LeBourgeois became the 38th President of the Naval War College in Newport, Rhode Island. During his presidency, he consolidated and refined radical curriculum changes made by his predecessor, Vice Admiral Stansfield Turner. He also laid the groundwork for the creation of the Center for Advanced Research at the college and initiated the establishment of the Naval War College Museum, a museum of naval history and of the U.S. Navy's regional history in Founders Hall. His tour as president ended on 1 April 1977, at which time he was awarded a second Distinguished Service Medal.

Upon completion of his Naval War College tour, LeBourgeois retired from the navy as a vice admiral.

== Personal life ==
LeBourgeois was married to Priscilla Dudley LeBourgeois (née Priscilla Alden Dudley) for nearly 64 years, and she survived him at his death. Other survivors include a son, Julien Dudley LeBourgeois, and daughter, Anne LeBourgeois Grieves (née Anne Armour LeBourgeois).

== Retirement and death ==
After retiring, LeBourgeois moved to New London, New Hampshire, where he led the creation of the popular "Adventures in Learning" continuing-education program at Colby-Sawyer College. In 2004, the college presented him with the Town Award for his involvement in the community and his contributions to the school. He later moved to Williamsburg, Virginia.

Suffering from heart and kidney disease, LeBourgeois died in a retirement community in Williamsburg on 16 September 2012. He was to be buried at the United States Naval Academy Cemetery in Annapolis, Maryland, in October 2012, but Hurricane Sandy forced a postponement of his funeral until 22 March 2013, when his cremated remains were interred with full military honors.

== Notes ==
Military offices
Preceded by Stansfield Turner	President of the Naval War College; 1974–1977	Succeeded by Huntington Hardisty
