= Stuart Nash Scott =

American lawyer

Stuart Nash Scott (December 6, 1906 – February 26, 1992) was an American lawyer and diplomat. He headed the "Scott Commission" that warned New York City prior to its 1975 fiscal crisis that its finances were out of control, and briefly served as Richard Nixon's United States Ambassador to Portugal.

== Biography ==
Scott was born in Madison, Wisconsin. He was a member of the Council on Foreign Relations. He served as United States Ambassador to Portugal from 1973 to 1974, when he was dismissed by Henry Kissinger because he did not share Kissinger's opinion that a communist takeover was imminent. He died of a stroke at his home in New York in 1992.

He graduated from Yale University (BA) and Harvard Law School (JD).

Diplomatic posts
Preceded by Ridgway B. Knight	United States Ambassador to Portugal; 1973–1975	Succeeded by Frank C. Carlucci
