= Benedict J. Semmes Jr. =

American navy admiral

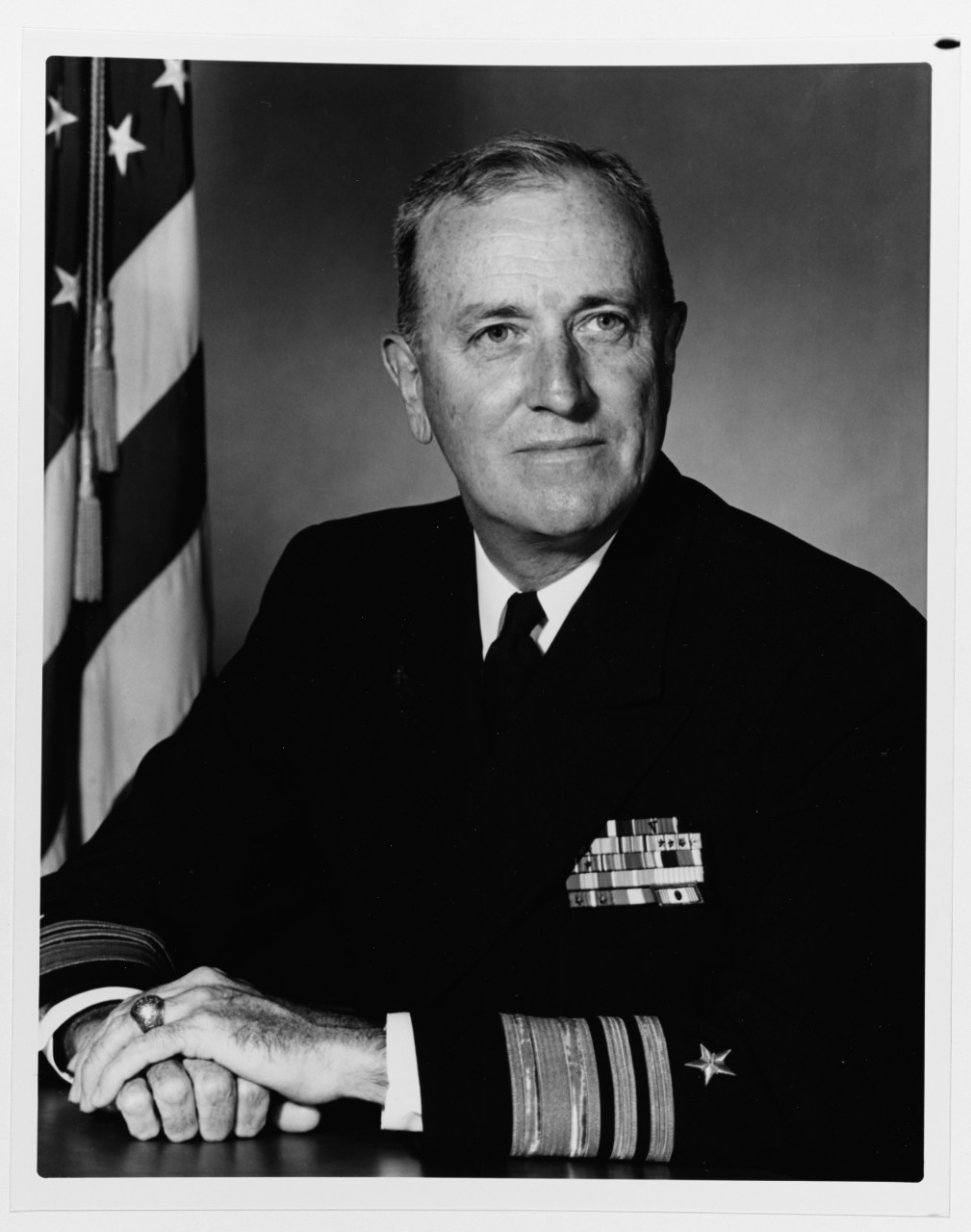
- VADM Benedict J. Semmes Jr., USN in 1965
- Born: 8 April 1913; Memphis, Tennessee, US
- Died: 4 June 1994 (aged 81); Virginia Beach, Virginia, US
- Burial place: Arlington National Cemetery, Arlington, Virginia
- Relatives: Walden L. Ainsworth (father-in-law)
- Military career
- Allegiance: United States of America
- Branch: United States Navy
- Service years: 1934–1972
- Rank: Vice Admiral
- Commands: USS Picking (DD-685); USS Ault (DD-698); Destroyer Division 302; USS Shenandoah (AD-26); Destroyer Flotilla Three; Middle East Force; Cruiser-Destroyer Force, Atlantic Fleet; Chief of Naval Personnel; United States Second Fleet; Strike Fleet, Atlantic; President of the Naval War College
- Conflicts: World War II; Neutrality Patrol; Occupation of Iceland; Malta convoys; Pacific War; Guadalcanal campaign; Battle of Tarawa; Leyte campaign; Luzon campaign; Okinawa campaign; Korean War; Cold War
- Awards: Navy Cross; Distinguished Service Medal; Legion of Merit; Bronze Star Medal with Combat "V"; Combat Action Ribbon; Navy Unit Commendation; Navy Meritorious Unit Commendation; American Defense Service Medal; Asiatic–Pacific Campaign Medal (two awards); World War II Victory Medal; Navy Occupation Service Medal; National Defense Service Medal (two awards); Korean Service Medal; Armed Forces Expeditionary Medal; Philippine Republic Presidential Unit Citation; United Nations Service Medal for Korea
- Other work: Director, Freedoms Foundation at Valley Forge; President, Wonalancet Preservation Society

Benedict Joseph Semmes Jr. (8 April 1913 – 4 June 1994) was a vice admiral of the United States Navy. His career included service in World War II and the Cold War, command of destroyers, a lengthy tour as Chief of Naval Personnel, command of the United States Second Fleet, duty as Deputy Chief of Naval Operations, and a tour as President of the Naval War College.

== Early life ==
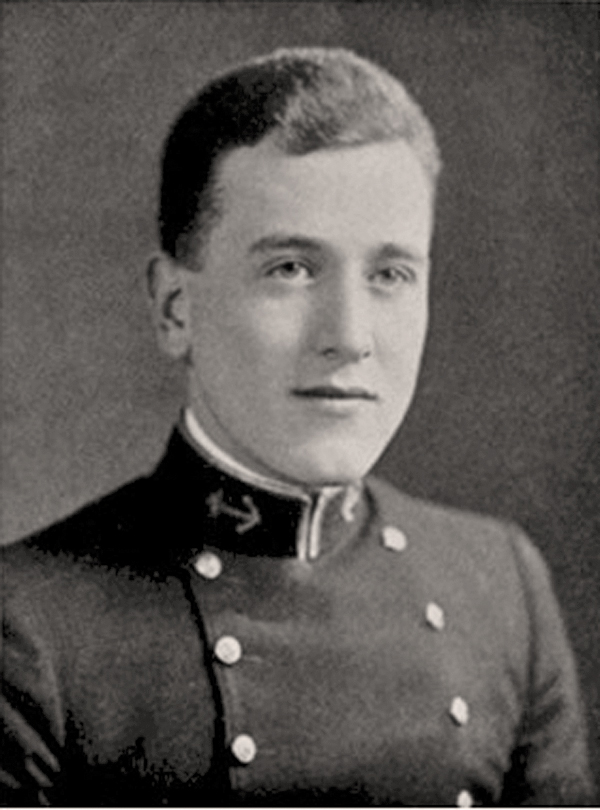
Semmes as a midshipman at the U.S. Naval Academy.

Semmes was born in Memphis, Tennessee, on 8 April 1913. He entered the United States Naval Academy in Annapolis, Maryland, with an appointment from Tennessee on 19 June 1930. He graduated on 31 May 1934 and was commissioned as an ensign the same day.

== Naval career ==
=== Early career ===
After graduating, Semmes's first assignment was duty aboard the battleship USS Mississippi (BB-41) on 30 June 1934, and he was aboard her in October 1934 when she transferred from the Scouting Force in the Atlantic Ocean to the Battle Force in the Pacific Ocean. He was promoted to lieutenant (junior grade) on 31 May 1937, and by the middle of 1937 was a member of the staff of the Battle Force. Completing his Battle Force tour in March 1938, he transferred to the destroyer USS Claxton (DD-140), patrolling off Spain in defense of American interests during the Spanish Civil War. By the middle of 1939 he had transferred the destroyer USS Badger (DD-126) and was qualified as a translator or interpreter of French.

In January 1940, Semmes reported for duty aboard the new aircraft carrier USS Wasp (CV-7), then fitting out at the Fore River Shipyard in Quincy, Massachusetts, and he became a member of her first crew when she was commissioned on 25 April 1940. Operating in the Atlantic and the Caribbean during 1940 and into through the first half of 1941, Wasp conducted sea trials, shakedown, training, and maneuvers, carried out the first experiment with flying United States Army Air Corps aircraft off an aircraft carrier for delivery to an airbase on shore, and took part in the Neutrality Patrol. Semmes received a promotion to lieutenant on 1 July 1941 while aboard Wasp, and that month Wasp supported the U.S. occupation of Iceland before resuming Neutrality Patrol operations.

=== World War II ===
The United States entered World War II on 7 December 1941. With Semmes still aboard, Wasp patrolled in the West Indies early in 1942, then deployed to Scapa Flow in the Orkney Islands in March 1942 to support the British Home Fleet in covering Arctic convoys bound for the Soviet Union. In April and May 1942 she made two voyages in the Mediterranean to Malta to deliver Royal Air Force Spitfire fighters to Malta. She then redeployed to the Pacific, where she supported U.S. forces in the Guadalcanal Campaign in August and September 1942 before the Imperial Japanese Navy submarine I-19 torpedoed her in the Coral Sea southeast of the Solomon Islands on 15 September 1942. Semmes, Wasp′s assistant gunnery officer at the time, reached the ship's forecastle, where he found about 150 men. He took charge of the group and with other officers ordered the men to make life rafts ready to launch, get mattresses from the ship's living spaces, and rig lines over the bow, all in preparation to abandon ship. Cut off from the rest of ship by fires and explosions, with a pool of burning oil forming around the bow and asphyxiating gasses sweeping over the forecastle, and unable to contact anyone else aboard Wasp, Semmes recommended to the senior officer present that everyone on the forecastle abandon ship, and the order to abandon followed. Semmes went over the side and at one point saw an 8-foot (2.4 m) shark circling his group of survivors as they swam toward the destroyer USS Duncan (DD-485) for rescue but decided not to tell the other men he had seen it. Meanwhile, Wasp sank with the loss of 193 lives.

In December 1942, Semmes reported to the new destroyer USS Sigsbee (DD-502), then fitting out at the Federal Shipbuilding and Dry Dock Company in Kearny, New Jersey. Upon her commissioning on 23 January 1943, he became her executive officer. During his tour, he received a promotion to the temporary rank of lieutenant commander on 1 March 1943. While Semmes was aboard,Sigsbee supported U.S. aircraft carrier raids against Marcus Island in August 1943, took part in a bombardment of Wake Island on 5 October 1943, and bombarded Betio, at Tarawa Atoll, on 22–23 November 1943 during the Battle of Tarawa.

Detaching from Sigsbee, Semmes was advanced to the temporary rank of commander on 1 February 1944. He took command of the destroyer USS Picking (DD-685) on 12 August 1944 and remained her commanding officer until August 1945. During his time in command, Picking escorted troop transports during the Leyte campaign in October 1944 – narrowly missing action in the Battle of Leyte Gulf – and escorted amphibious forces and rendered gunfire support to troops ashore during the Luzon campaign in January 1945.

In April and May 1945, Picking repeated these duties during the Okinawa campaign. When, on 18 May 1945, the destroyer USS Longshaw (DD-559) ran aground on a reef 1 nautical mile (1.9 km; 1.2 mi) off the coast of Okinawa and came under fire from Japanese artillery on the island, Picking attempted to pull Longshaw off the reef under Japanese fire and, failing in that, stood by Longshaw, returning fire against the Japanese guns and defending Longshaw until Longshaw's crew was forced to abandon ship. Semmes received the Navy Cross for this action, the citation reading in part:

...as Commanding Officer of the Destroyer U.S.S. PICKING (DD-685), in action against the enemy on 18 May 1945, during the assault and occupation of Okinawa...Gallantly responding to the need for assistance by a friendly destroyer grounded on a reef within one mile of the hostile coast, Commander Semmes skillfully maneuvered his ship through the hazardous, obstructed waters in a determined attempt to re-float the stricken vessel. Unsuccessful in this mission because of inadequate towing facilities and with both ships highly vulnerable under the sudden attack by hostile shore batteries, Commander Semmes promptly countered the enemy's devastating fire with powerful blasts from the PICKING's heavy guns, handling his ship superbly to evade the shattering barrages while screening the damaged destroyer. Again closing the helpless vessel, he daringly stood by, continuing his fierce and relentless bombardment of opposing shore emplacements and rendering heroic service in the rescue of personnel...

Semmes also received the Bronze Star Medal with Combat "V" for heroism in command of Picking.

=== Post-World War II and Cold War ===
Semmes was commanding officer of the destroyer USS Ault (DD-698) from January 1948 to July 1949. By the beginning of 1949, his promotion to commander had become permanent, with his date of rank backdated to 1 February 1944.

Semmes was promoted to the temporary rank of captain on 1 July 1953. In 1953, Semmes took command of Destroyer Division 302 — consisting of USS Daly (DD-519), USS Smalley (DD-565), USS Clarence K. Bronson (DD-668), and USS Cotten (DD-669) — in the United States Seventh Fleet, and the division saw combat service off Korea during the last three weeks of the Korean War before the 27 July 1953 armistice brought the conflict to an end. The division, which he took command of off Korea after it had steamed westward from Newport, Rhode Island, for its Korea deployment, continued westward in November 1953 under his command after the conclusion of its Korea service, completing a circumnavigation of the world when it arrived at Newport in January 1954. Semmes detached from command of the division in 1954.

From 1955 to 1957, Semmes was chief of staff to the Commander, Destroyer Force, Atlantic Fleet, based at Newport, Rhode Island, followed by a year of study at the National War College in Washington, D.C., from which he graduated in 1958. He then reported for duty as commanding officer of the destroyer tender USS Shenandoah (AD-26). On 18 July 1958, during his tour aboard Shenandoah, President Dwight Eisenhower approved his promotion to rear admiral, making him the first member of his Naval Academy graduating class to be selected for flag rank.

After detaching from Shenandoah, Semmes took command of Destroyer Flotilla Three at Long Beach, California, on 30 September 1958. His promotion to rear admiral became effective on 1 July 1959. After a tour ashore as Assistant Chief of Naval Personnel for Plans, Semmes served as Commander, Middle East Force, in the Persian Gulf from 30 May 1962 to 9 July 1963. In August 1963, he became Commander, Cruiser-Destroyer Force, Atlantic Fleet.

Semmes was promoted to vice admiral on 1 April 1964, and he became Chief of Naval Personnel the same day, serving in the position until March 1968; he was awarded the Distinguished Service Medal and the Legion of Merit for the tour. The citations for both awards read in part:

...as Deputy Chief of Naval Operations (Manpower and Naval Reserve) and Chief of Naval Personnel from April 1964 through March 1968. During this crucial period of an accelerating tempo of operations incident to the conflict in Southeast Asia, Vice Admiral Semmes has demonstrated dynamic leadership, outstanding executive ability and exceptional foresight in anticipating and solving the diverse personnel problems associated with rapidly expanding manpower requirements. By his insight and perceptiveness as a result of long experience in manpower and personnel matters, he has provided an authoritative voice in manpower decision in the executive levels of the Navy, Department of Defense and before the Congress. Despite the pressure of increasing personnel requirements, Vice Admiral Semmes has remained steadfast as the champion of the Navy's men and women. His deep concern for their morale and welfare has been manifested in programs he has vigorously sponsored to increase compensation eligibility, educational opportunity, and career attractiveness. Major improvements in planning and management techniques to provide more effective personnel utilization have clearly demonstrated Vice Admiral Semmes' ingenuity and flair for innovation. His forthright presentation of facts and authoritative opinions before Congress and other leaders of the Government has provided a better understanding of the Navy's objectives...

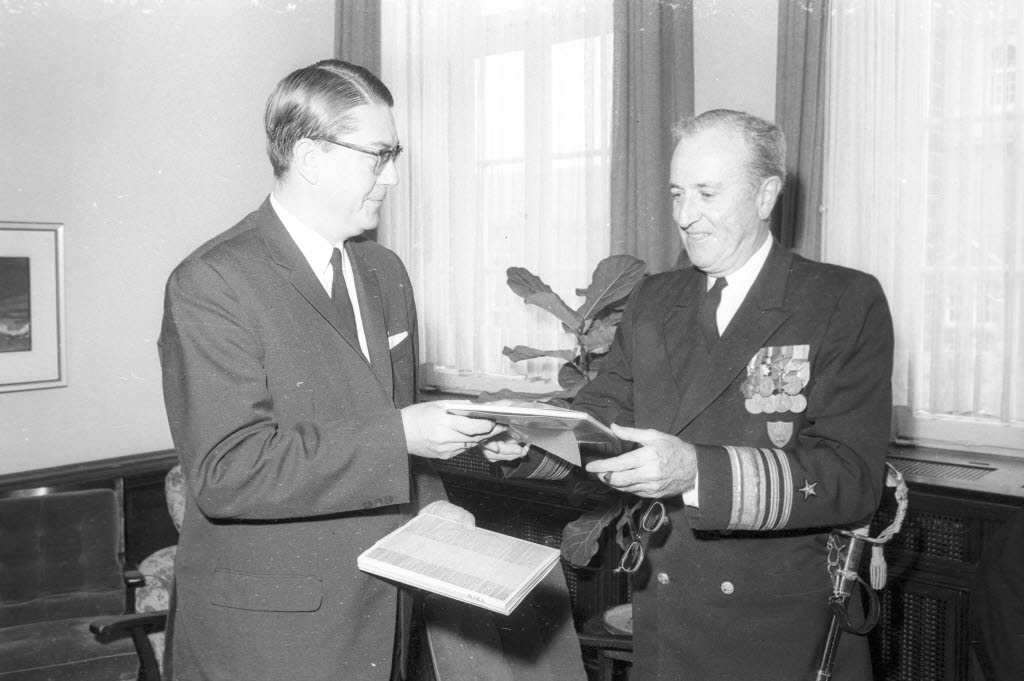
Semmes (right) with Dr. Rudolf Titzck, Mayor of Kiel during his service as Commander of the United States Second Fleet, on October 8, 1969.

In April 1968 Semmes became Commander of the United States Second Fleet, with additional duty as Commander, Strike Fleet, Atlantic, until September 1970. His flagship was the guided-missile light cruiser USS Springfield (CLG-7). He then served as Deputy Chief of Naval Operations from October 1970 to July 1971, receiving a gold star in lieu of a second award of the Legion of Merit for the tour, the citation reading in part:

...Vice Admiral Semmes maintained the surface fleet in a high state of readiness, combining all available units to obtain the most flexible and effective surface forces possible. His personal decisions and guidance influenced the configuration and capabilities of all ship types and methods of warfare, not only for the present by for decades to come. Vice Admiral Semmes provided the blueprint for many of the Navy's most critical programs of the future including LAMPS, Anti-Ship Missile Defense, and the new PF Class ship [later the Oliver Hazard Perry-class frigate]. While planning for the Navy of the future, he was ever mindful of the condition of our present operating forces. He monitored the modernization of surface ships while striving to keep operational commitments within force capabilities. Vice Admiral Semmes exercised the finest managerial skill by remaining within severe budgetary limitations while extracting the greatest possible value for each dollar spent....

On 17 August 1971, Semmes became the 36th President of the Naval War College at Newport, Rhode Island. He served as president until 30 June 1972. During his presidency, he shifted the college's emphasis from foreign and international affairs to management concepts.

Semmes's standard biography as a flag officer routinely mentions shore tours he made with the Gulf Sea Frontier and in Germany with the United States Naval Forces Germany during his career, but provides no dates for these tours. They may have taken place in the late 1940s or early 1950s.

Semmes retired from the Navy in 1972 as a vice admiral upon the conclusion of his Naval War College presidency.

== Personal life ==
Semmes was married to the former Katharine "Kit" Ainsworth (23 May 1918 – 24 May 2007), the daughter of Vice Admiral Walden L. "Pug" Ainsworth (10 November 1886 – 7 August 1960). They had a son, Benedict Joseph III, and three daughters, Walden, Raphaelle, and Amy. one of whom, Raphaelle, died during Benedict Semmes's lifetime on 6 April 1993.

Semmes was a resident of Wonalancet, New Hampshire, but also lived frequently in the Washington, D.C., area from 1952 until his death.

Semmes was a member of the Army and Navy Club and the Society of the Cincinnati in Washington, D.C. In retirement, he was director of the Freedoms Foundation at Valley Forge and president of the Wonalancet Preservation Society.

== Death ==
Semmes was visiting Virginia Beach, Virginia, to attend the 27 May 1994 decommissioning of the frigate USS Ainsworth (FF-1090) – namesake of his father-in-law – when he fell ill. He died of respiratory failure in a hospital there on 4 June 1994 after undergoing intestinal surgery. He is buried with his wife at Arlington National Cemetery in Arlington, Virginia.

== Awards ==
- Navy Cross
- Navy Distinguished Service Medal
- Legion of Merit
- Bronze Star Medal with Combat "V"
- Combat Action Ribbon
- Navy Unit Commendation
- Navy Meritorious Unit Commendation
- American Defense Service Medal
- American Campaign Medal
- Asiatic–Pacific Campaign Medal with three service stars
- European–African–Middle Eastern Campaign Medal with one star
- World War II Victory Medal
- Navy Occupation Service Medal
- National Defense Service Medal (two awards)
- Korean Service Medal
- Armed Forces Expeditionary Medal
- Philippine Liberation Medal with two stars
- Philippine Republic Presidential Unit Citation
- United Nations Service Medal for Korea

== Notes ==
Military offices
Preceded by Richard G. Colbert	President of the Naval War College; 17 August 1971–30 June 1972	Succeeded by Stansfield Turner
