= Frank Carlucci =

American politician (1930–2018)

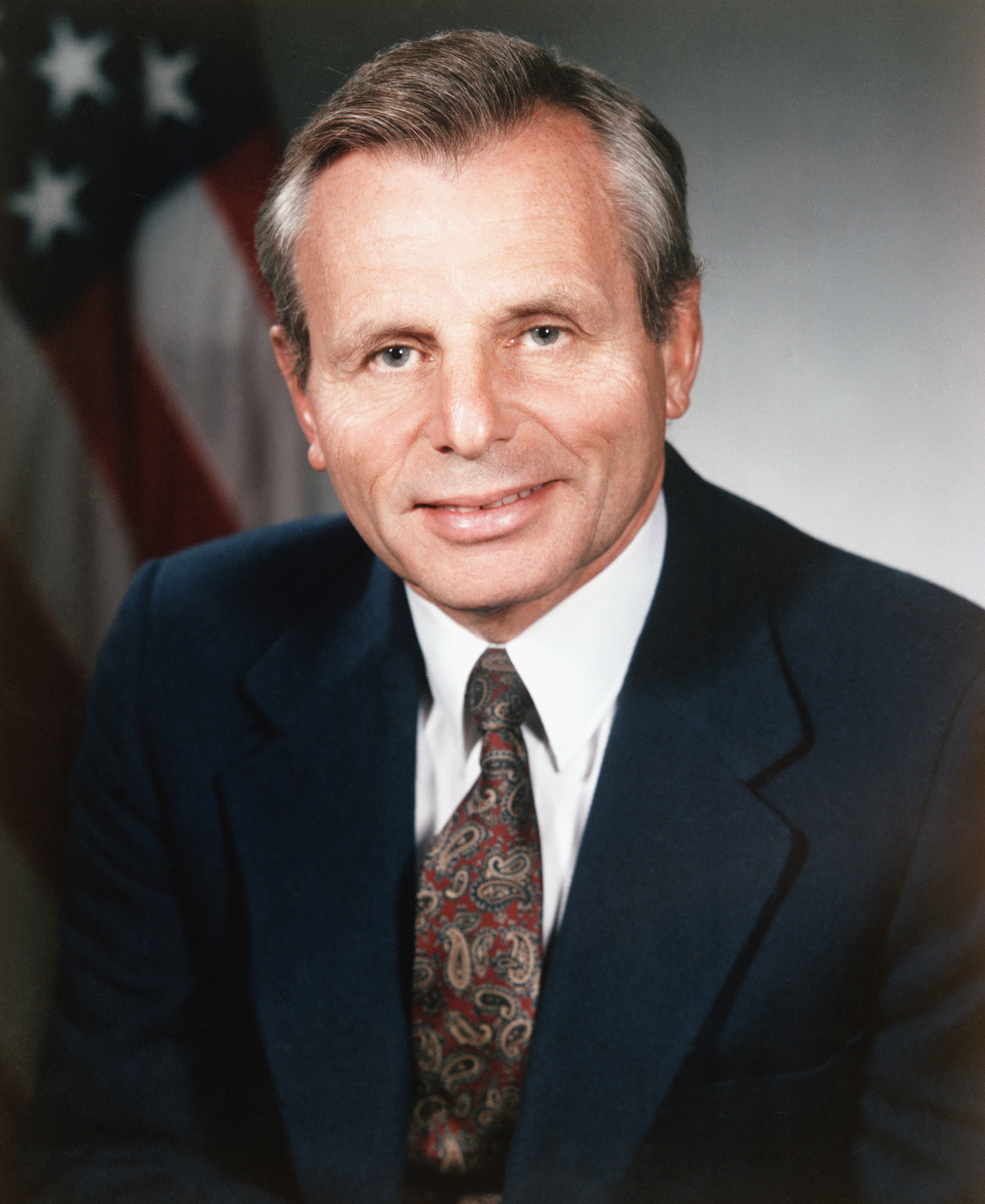
- Official portrait, 1987

16th United States Secretary of Defense
- In office November 23, 1987 – January 20, 1989
- President: Ronald Reagan
- Deputy: William Taft
- Preceded by: Caspar Weinberger
- Succeeded by: Dick Cheney

14th United States National Security Advisor
- In office December 2, 1986 – November 23, 1987
- President: Ronald Reagan
- Deputy: Peter Rodman; Colin Powell
- Preceded by: John Poindexter
- Succeeded by: Colin Powell

19th United States Deputy Secretary of Defense
- In office February 4, 1981 – December 31, 1982
- President: Ronald Reagan
- Preceded by: Graham Claytor
- Succeeded by: Paul Thayer

13th Deputy Director of Central Intelligence
- In office February 10, 1978 – February 5, 1981
- President: Jimmy Carter; Ronald Reagan
- Preceded by: John F. Blake
- Succeeded by: Bobby Inman

United States Ambassador to Portugal
- In office January 24, 1975 – February 5, 1978
- President: Gerald Ford; Jimmy Carter
- Preceded by: Stuart Scott
- Succeeded by: Richard Bloomfield

4th Director of the Office of Economic Opportunity
- In office January 1971 – December 1972
- President: Richard Nixon
- Preceded by: Donald Rumsfeld
- Succeeded by: Phillip V. Sanchez

Personal details
- Born: Frank Charles Carlucci III; October 18, 1930 Scranton, Pennsylvania, U.S.
- Died: June 3, 2018 (aged 87) McLean, Virginia, U.S.
- Resting place: Arlington National Cemetery
- Party: Republican
- Spouses: Jean Anthony (m. 1954; div. 1974) Marcia Myers (m. 1976)
- Children: 3
- Education: Princeton University (AB); Harvard University (MBA)

Military service
- Branch/service: United States Navy
- Years of service: 1952–1954
- Rank: Lieutenant

Frank Charles Carlucci III (/ˌkɑːrˈluːtʃi/ kar-LOO-chee; October 18, 1930 – June 3, 2018) was an American politician who served as the United States Secretary of Defense from 1987 to 1989 in the administration of President Ronald Reagan. He was the first Italian American to serve in that position.

Carlucci served in a variety of senior-level governmental positions, including Director of the Office of Economic Opportunity in the Nixon administration, Deputy Director of the CIA in the Carter administration, and Deputy Secretary of Defense and National Security Advisor in the Reagan administration.

== Early life and education ==
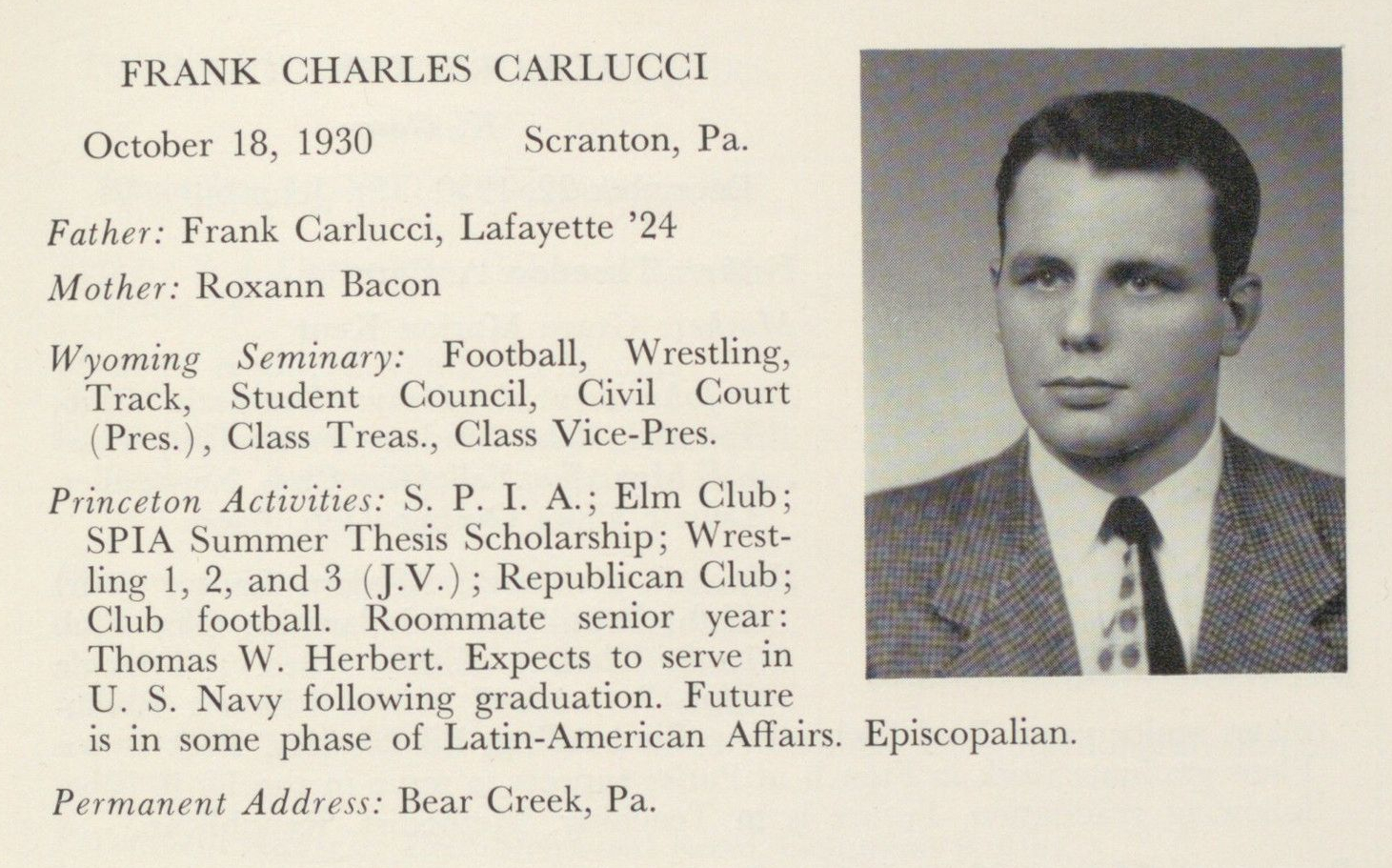
Carlucci in the Princeton University yearbook, 1952

Carlucci was born in Scranton, Pennsylvania, the son of Roxann (née Bacon) and Frank Charles Carlucci, Jr., an insurance broker. His father was of Italian and Swiss-Italian descent. His grandfather was from Santomenna, Italy.

After graduating from Wyoming Seminary in 1948, Carlucci attended Princeton University, where he roomed with Donald Rumsfeld. Carlucci graduated with an A.B. from the Woodrow Wilson School of Public and International Affairs at Princeton University in 1952 after completing a 153-page senior thesis, "Two American Businesses in Costa Rica." He then attended Harvard Business School for an M.B.A. in 1954–1955. He was an officer in the US Navy from 1952 to 1954.

== Early career ==
Carlucci joined the US Foreign Service and worked for the US State Department from 1956 to 1969.

In 1961, Carlucci was the second secretary at the US Embassy in the Congo. During that time, Patrice Lumumba, the first prime minister of independent Congo, was killed in January 1961 during the Congo Crisis.

According to subsequently-released US government documents, US President Dwight Eisenhower ordered the CIA to eliminate Lumumba. Minutes of an August 1960 National Security Council meeting confirm that Eisenhower told CIA chief Allen Dulles to "eliminate" the Congolese leader. The official notetaker, Robert H. Johnson, testified to that before the Senate Intelligence Committee in 1975. However, subsequent investigations indicate that Lumumba was ultimately executed by an order of a political rival, Moïse Tshombe, who led the State of Katanga, with Belgian assistance.

According to Robert B. Oakley, Carlucci befriended the future Congo Prime Minister Cyrille Adoula in 1959-1960, who was then a Congolese Member of Parliament. According to James Schlesinger, Adoula began a White House meeting with President John F. Kennedy with the question "Où est Carlucci?" ("Where is Carlucci?"). Kennedy first responded, "Who the hell is Carlucci?" He then sent Dean Rusk to find him. Oakley added that that instance was "the beginning of Carlucci's meteoric rise!"

A fictionalized 2000 biopic, Lumumba, directed by Raoul Peck, portrayed Carlucci as being involved in the murder of Lumumba during his service in Congo. Carlucci furiously denied the claims and successfully went to court to prevent himself from being named in the film when it was released in the United States.

Carlucci served alongside Herbert S. Okun on US military attaché General Vernon A. Walters' team in Brazil at the time of the 1964 Brazilian coup d'état against President João Goulart.

== Federal service ==
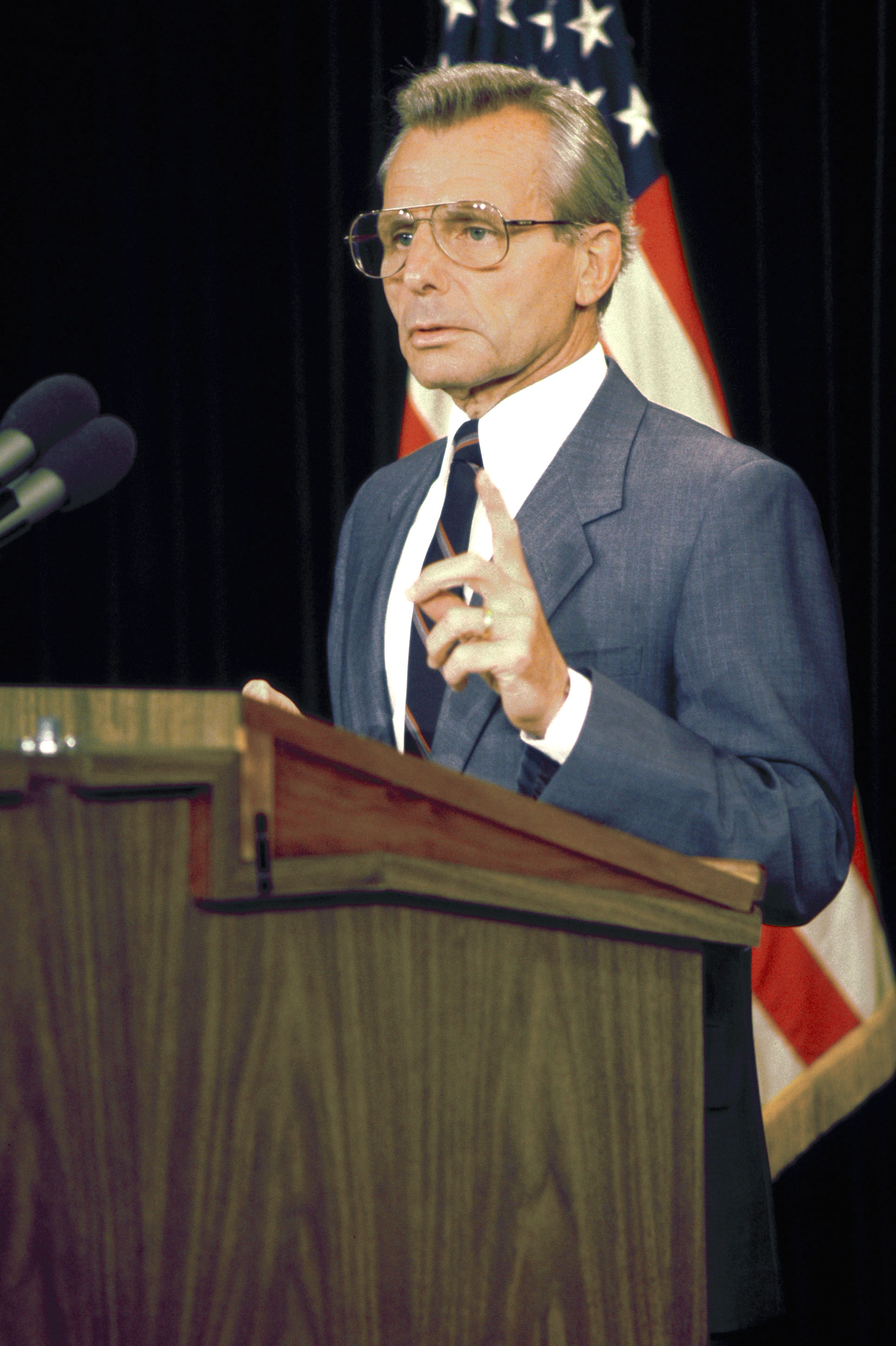
Secretary Carlucci at a press conference, 1988

In 1969, when US President Richard Nixon persuaded U.S Representative Donald Rumsfeld to leave his seat to become the director of the Office of Economic Opportunity (OEO), the agency created by Sargent Shriver to fight Lyndon Johnson's War on Poverty, Rumsfeld had Carlucci transferred to OEO from the State Department to head up the Community Action Program. Carlucci was Undersecretary of Health, Education and Welfare when Caspar Weinberger was secretary during the Nixon administration.

In the aftermath of the catastrophic flooding caused by Hurricane Agnes in June 1972, Nixon designated Carlucci to lead the federal response in northeastern Pennsylvania because of his personal ties to the region. At the time, Agnes was the costliest tropical cyclone in U.S. history, and the Wyoming Valley of Pennsylvania was one of the worst hit areas. Carlucci's time in this role was viewed positively by commonwealth and local officials, as well as the general public, given his local ties and effectiveness.

Carlucci became Ambassador to Portugal and served in that position from 1974 to 1977. He was remembered in Portugal among the winners of the coup of 25 November 1975. The Carlucci American International School of Lisbon, the oldest American school in the Iberian Peninsula, is named after him. In 2019, the official residence of the U.S. Ambassador to Portugal, located in the Lapa neighborhood of Lisbon, was named in his honor.

Carlucci was Deputy Director of the CIA from 1978 to 1981, under Director Stansfield Turner.

=== Department of Defense ===
Carlucci was United States Deputy Secretary of Defense from 1981 to 1983. He served as United States National Security Advisor from 1986 to 1987, where he appointed Colin Powell, later his successor, as Deputy National Security Advisor.

Carlucci became US Secretary of Defense in 1987 after Caspar Weinberger resigned due his wife's disabling back pain. Carlucci served in that position until the end of the Reagan administration, on January 20, 1989. Carlucci was notable during the administration for advocating an arms build-up known as the Strategic Defense Initiative to hasten the end of the Cold War, a policy that Reagan followed.

== Later life ==
=== Business ===
After leaving the Reagan administration in 1983, Carlucci was named president and later chairman of Sears World Trade, a subsidiary of Sears. Sears announced it would wind down the subsidiary in October 1986. By December 1986, Carlucci returned to government service. He served as inaugural chairman of the Carlyle Group from 1992 to 2003 and chairman emeritus until 2005. He had business interests in the following companies: Ashland Global Holdings, General Dynamics, Westinghouse, Neurogen, CB Commercial Real Estate, Nortel, BDM International, Quaker Oats, and Kaman. Carlucci was at one time a director of the private security firm Wackenhut and was a co-founder and senior member of the Frontier Group, a private-equity investment firm. Carlucci was an advisory board member of G2 Satellite Solutions and the Chairman Emeritus of Nortel.

=== Organizations ===
Carlucci was affiliated with the Project for the New American Century (PNAC), a conservative think tank. He was Chairman Emeritus of the US-Taiwan Business Council after he had been Chairman from 1999 to 2002; he was succeeded in 2003 by William Cohen. Carlucci was a member of the Board of Trustees of the RAND Corporation and was a founding co-chair of the Advisory Board for RAND's Center for Middle East Public Policy. He was also a member of the Honorary Board of the Drug Policy Alliance, a group that advocates drug legalization.

== Personal life and death ==
Carlucci was married to Billie Jean Anthony from 1954 until the couple divorced in 1974. They had two children. Carlucci was later married to Marcia McMillan Myers from 1976 until his death. They had one daughter.

Carlucci died on June 3, 2018, from complications of Parkinson's disease, at his home in McLean, Virginia, at the age of 87.

== Honors ==
- Grand-Cross of the Order of Prince Henry, Portugal (November 24, 2003)

Political offices
Preceded by Donald Rumsfeld	Director of the Office of Economic Opportunity; 1971–1972	Succeeded by Philip Sanchez
Preceded by Graham Claytor	United States Deputy Secretary of Defense; 1981–1983	Succeeded by Paul Thayer
Preceded by John Poindexter	National Security Advisor; 1986–1987	Succeeded by Colin Powell
Preceded by Caspar Weinberger	United States Secretary of Defense; 1987–1989	Succeeded by Dick Cheney
Diplomatic posts
Preceded by Stuart Scott	United States Ambassador to Portugal; 1975–1978	Succeeded by Richard Bloomfield
Government offices
Preceded by John F. Blake	Deputy Director of Central Intelligence; 1978–1981	Succeeded by Bobby Inman
