= E. Henry Knoche =

American intelligence officer

Acting Director of Central Intelligence
- In office January 20, 1977 – March 9, 1977
- President: Jimmy Carter
- Preceded by: George H. W. Bush
- Succeeded by: Stansfield Turner

11th Deputy Director of Central Intelligence
- In office July 7, 1976 – August 1, 1977
- President: Gerald Ford; Jimmy Carter
- Preceded by: Vernon A. Walters
- Succeeded by: John F. Blake

Personal details
- Born: Enno Henry Knoche; January 14, 1925 Charleston, West Virginia, U.S.
- Died: July 9, 2010 (aged 85)
- Education: Washington & Jefferson College
- Awards: President's Award for Distinguished Federal Civilian Service (1977)

Enno Henry Knoche (January 14, 1925 – July 9, 2010), known colloquially as 'Hank,' was an American intelligence officer who served as deputy director of the Central Intelligence Agency and acting Director of Central Intelligence.

== Life and career ==
Knoche attended Mt. Lebanon School District, where he played basketball and tennis, winning a Western Pennsylvania Interscholastic Athletic League doubles championship. In 1942, he enrolled in Washington & Jefferson College, playing baseball and the freshman basketball team. He then enlisted in the United States Navy to serve in World War II in 1943. Later, he attended Bethany College, again playing basketball and leading the team in scoring. He then attended University of Colorado Boulder, where he led his basketball team to the 1946 NCAA Men's Division I Basketball Tournament and played baseball. Following his discharge from the military, he returned to W&J to complete his degree, graduating in 1947. He then played for 2 years in the professional National Industrial Basketball League, leading his team in scoring both years. He was drafted by the failing Pittsburgh Ironmen in the 1947 BAA Draft. (Note: Overall, it is unclear exactly which professional basketball team Knoche played for in 1947-1948. One source indicates that he played for the National Industrial Basketball League, while another source does not mention it at all, instead discussing the Pittsburgh Ironmen, which were not part of the National Industrial Basketball League) When his contract was then sold to the New York Knicks, Knoche demanded $2,500 (equivalent to $36,000 in 2025) to play for the team, a demand that was not met.

He served in the United States Navy as a Navy intelligence officer, in World War II, and the Korean War. He became a lieutenant.

He joined the CIA in 1953 as an analyst; he was fluent in Russian and the Fuzhou dialect. During the Cuban Missile Crisis, he briefed President John F. Kennedy. Even though he lacked the typical CIA resume, as having never served in operational capacity or in the clandestine operations, he was steadily promoted through the agency's ranks. On July 7, 1976 he became deputy director, serving under director George H. W. Bush. In that position, he was responsible for day-to-day agency operations.

On January 12, 1977, he was honored as a recipient of the President's Award for Distinguished Federal Civilian Service. Presentation of the award was made in the East Room of the White House by Vice President Nelson Rockefeller.

Upon Bush's resignation from the CIA with the inauguration of President Jimmy Carter on January 20, 1977, Knoche became acting director. That day, he briefed Carter on the agency's ongoing clandestine operations. On January 21, 1977, he met with the president and delivered photo intelligence from Aerospace Data Facility-East. His term as acting director ended when Stansfield Turner was confirmed as director of the CIA on March 9, 1977.

Knoche retired on August 1, 1977. He was awarded the President's Award for Distinguished Federal Civilian Service.

He married Angie Papoulas in 1947; they had five sons.
