= Halloween Massacre of 1977 =

Mass-firing event at the Central Intelligence Agency

The Halloween Massacre was the name given by news media in the United States to a mass-firing and layoff which occurred in October 1977 at the Central Intelligence Agency (CIA) after the appointment of Stansfield Turner as the director of the Central Intelligence Agency, in which he reduced the agency by over 20% of its existing staff – all of whom were members of the Clandestine Services Division. His initial focus was to have CIA officers voluntarily "retire in place," sending written requests to these officers asking for their resignation, and when many of them did not resign, he then eliminated them from the agency. He removed over 800 staffers overall, but initially began by sending termination letters to around 200 employees – many of whom were on active deployment and stationed overseas at the time. Officially, the reason for the mass firing was to bring the agency's budget overhead down, but many historians write that it was motivated through political inclinations. Described as a "bureaucratic nightmare," the event followed a string of political controversies through the 70's involving the CIA, including the Church Committee, the Watergate scandal and the Saturday Night Massacre. Officers at the agency went on strike action, perhaps the first time in the agency's history that this type of workplace action occurred. CIA employees tagged the agency's billboards with graffiti, wore tee shirts with slogans on them in protest against Director Turner, labelling him as the "Arm-chair Admiral." For several years afterward, the former CIA officer Bill O'Brien and other officers on a class action lawsuit against the agency for wrongful termination.

== See also ==
- Intelligence Reform and Terrorism Prevention Act
- 2008 Boeing machinists' strike
- Department of Government Efficiency
