= USS Conquest (AM-488) =

Minesweeper of the United States Navy

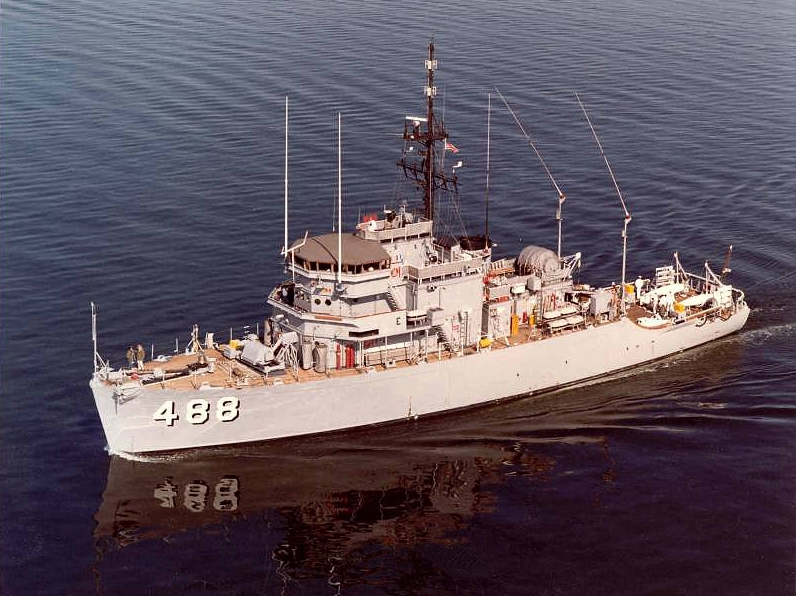
- USS Conquest (MSO-488)

History

United States
- Name: USS Conquest (MSO-488)
- Builder: J. M. Martinac Shipbuilding Corp., Tacoma, Washington
- Laid down: 26 March 1953
- Launched: 20 May 1954
- Commissioned: 8 July 1955
- Decommissioned: 29 June 1994
- Reclassified: MSO-488, 7 February 1955
- Stricken: 29 June 1994
- Fate: Sold to ROC, 1 March 1995

History

Republic of China
- Name: ROCS Yung Tzu (MSO-1307)
- Acquired: 1 March 1995
- Cost: $742,779
- Commissioned: 1 Mar 1995
- Decommissioned: 1 Sep 2020

General characteristics
- Class & type: Aggressive-class minesweeper
- Displacement: 775 long tons (787 t) full load
- Length: 172 ft (52 m)
- Beam: 35 ft (11 m)
- Draft: 12 ft (3.7 m)
- Propulsion: 4 × Packard ID1700 diesel engines (later replaced by Waukasha Motors Co. diesels); 2 × shafts; 2 × controllable pitch propellers
- Speed: 14 knots (26 km/h; 16 mph)
- Complement: 8 officers, 70 enlisted
- Armament: As built : 1 × single 40 mm gun mount; 2 × .50 cal (12.7 mm) twin machine guns; Final configuarion : 1 × twin 20 mm gun mount; 2 × .50 cal (12.7 mm) twin machine guns

USS Conquest (MSO-488) was an Agile-class minesweeper in the United States Navy.

Conquest was laid down by the J.M. Martinac Shipbuilding Corp. of Tacoma, Washington on 26 March 1953 as AM-488, launched on 20 March 1954 by Mrs. C. D. Henderson. She was reclassified MSO-488 on 7 February 1955, and commissioned on 8 July 1955.

== Service history ==
One of a new type of non-magnetic minesweepers, Conquest remained operating out of Long Beach, California on trials and training until 2 October 1956. She sailed to Acapulco, Mexico, for a good will visit from 10 to 14 October, then returned to Long Beach to prepare for her first tour of duty in the Far East. Sailing 4 March 1957, Conquest visited Chinhae, South Korea, and Kaohsiung, Formosa for operations with the Republic of China Navy; Hong Kong, and various ports in Japan before returning to Long Beach on 13 September 1957 for overhaul. During 1958 she operated locally out of Long Beach and conducted a series of minesweeping exercises at Esquimalt, Nootka Sound, and Vancouver, British Columbia, from 6 October to 19 November. Between 17 August 1959 and 13 March 1960, she again served in the Far East, returning to local operations through June 1960.

Conquest was decommissioned on 29 June 1994, stricken from the Naval Vessel Register on 29 June 1994 and sold on 1 March 1995. Conquest was sold to Republic of China to be designated Yung Tzu (MSO-1307) for $742,779

Call sign: "November - Tango - Alpha - Whiskey"

== Awards ==
Conquest received 26 unit awards and citations:

- Armed Forces Expeditionary Medals for Quemoy-Matsu, Vietnam and Persian Gulf (8)
- Combat Action Ribbons (2)
- Navy E Ribbons (3)
- Navy Unit Commendation (1)
- Republic of Vietnam Meritorious Unit Citation Gallantry (3)
- Secretary of the Navy Letter of Commendation 1982 (1)
- Vietnam Service Medals (8)
