= USS Picking =

Fletcher-class destroyer

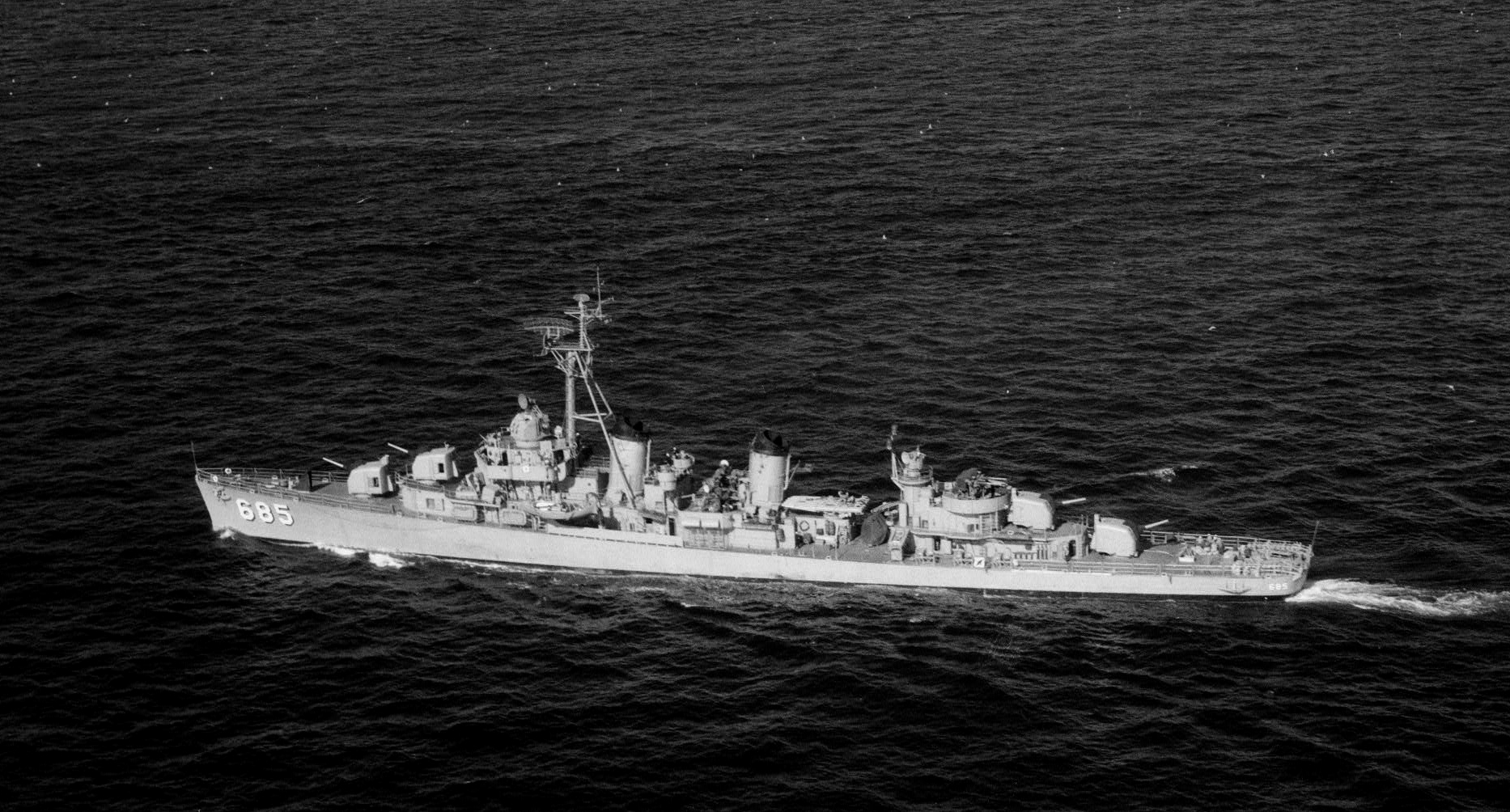
- USS Picking (DD-685) underway on 24 October 1951

History

United States
- Name: Picking
- Namesake: Sherwood Picking
- Builder: Bethlehem Shipbuilding Corporation, Staten Island, N.Y.
- Laid down: 24 November 1942
- Launched: 1 June 1943
- Commissioned: 21 September 1943
- Decommissioned: 20 December 1945
- Recommissioned: 26 January 1951
- Decommissioned: 6 September 1969
- Stricken: 1 March 1975
- Fate: Sunk as a target, 27 February 1997

General characteristics
- Class & type: Fletcher-class destroyer
- Displacement: 2,050 tons
- Length: 376.4 ft (114.7 m)
- Beam: 39.6 ft (12.1 m)
- Draft: 13.8 ft (4.2 m)
- Propulsion: 60,000 shp (45,000 kW); 2 propellers
- Speed: 38 kn (70 km/h; 44 mph)
- Range: 6,500 nmi (12,000 km; 7,500 mi) at 15 kn (28 km/h; 17 mph)
- Complement: 329
- Armament: 5 × 5 in (127 mm)/38 cal. guns; 10 × 40 mm AA guns, 7 × 20 mm AA guns, 10 × 21 inch (533 mm) torpedo tubes

USS Picking (DD-685), a Fletcher-class destroyer, was a ship of the United States Navy named for Sherwood Picking (1890–1941), a submarine commander during World War I.

== Namesake ==
Sherwood Picking was born on 21 February 1890 in Baltimore, Maryland. He graduated from the United States Naval Academy in 1911. During World War I, Lieutenant Commander Picking was awarded the Navy Cross for his heroism as the commander of the submarine USS O-10. During the inter-war period, he commanded the submarine base at Coco Solo, Canal Zone. He was promoted to Captain on 1 July 1939. He died on 1 September 1941 in a plane crash in Scotland en route to temporary duty in London.

== Construction and commissioning ==
Picking (DD–685) was laid down on 24 November 1942 by Bethlehem Steel Co., Inc., Staten Island, N.Y.; launched on 1 June 1943; sponsored by Mrs. Sherwood Picking; and commissioned on 21 September 1943.

== Service history ==
=== World War II ===
Following shakedown off Bermuda, Picking proceeded via the Panama Canal to Dutch Harbor, Alaska, where she arrived 28 December 1943 to serve with the North Pacific Fleet, Destroyer Squadron 49. She bombarded Paramushiro, Kuriles, 4 February 1944, Matsuwa Island, Kuriles, 13 June, and Paramushiro again 26 June. In August she steamed to San Francisco, California for upkeep, and then to Hawaii, arriving Pearl Harbor on the 31st where she joined the 3rd Fleet. Escorting attack transports, she arrived at Manus Island 3 October.

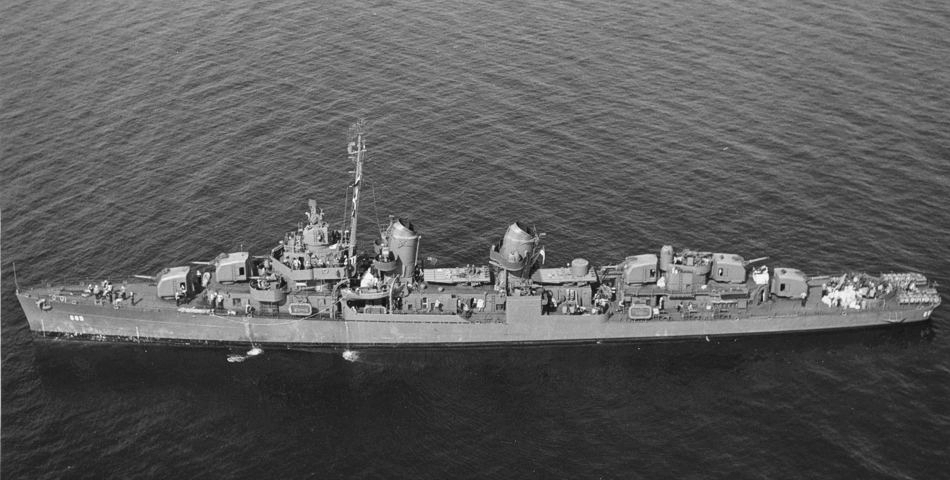
Picking in World War II.

Assigned to the 7th Fleet, she screened for the southern landings on Leyte 20 October. While escorting unloaded transports bound for Hollandia, New Guinea, she splashed one plane 24 October. Upon news of the Battle off Samar Island, Picking rushed to provide protection. She and Hale splashed one plane on 25 October. After the Battle for Leyte Gulf, she escorted Mount Olympus and Auriga to Manus Island and returned to Leyte 20 November to protect Allied convoys bringing reinforcements.

Following replenishment at Manus, Picking provided antiaircraft protection for the beachhead at Lingayen Gulf, Philippines on 9 January 1945. She screened landings at San Antonio, Philippines on 29 January and provided fire support and screen protection as troops went ashore on Mariveles on 15 February, and on Corregidor 16 February.

Following replenishment at Leyte, the destroyer arrived off Kerama Retto, Ryukyus on 26 March, and screened transports during landings that morning. Assigned to fire support duty on 1 April, she bombarded Japanese positions on Okinawa vigorously. She splashed two enemy planes on 6 April, another on 9 April, and saved one Navy aviator on 17 April. She rescued survivors from the destroyer Longshaw, off Naha, Okinawa, 18 May. Relieved of fire support duties on 7 June, she served as a radar picket until 23 June when she sailed for Saipan. Following her return to San Francisco at the end of the war, Picking decommissioned 20 December 1945, and entered the Pacific Reserve Fleet at San Diego.

=== 1951 – 1969 ===
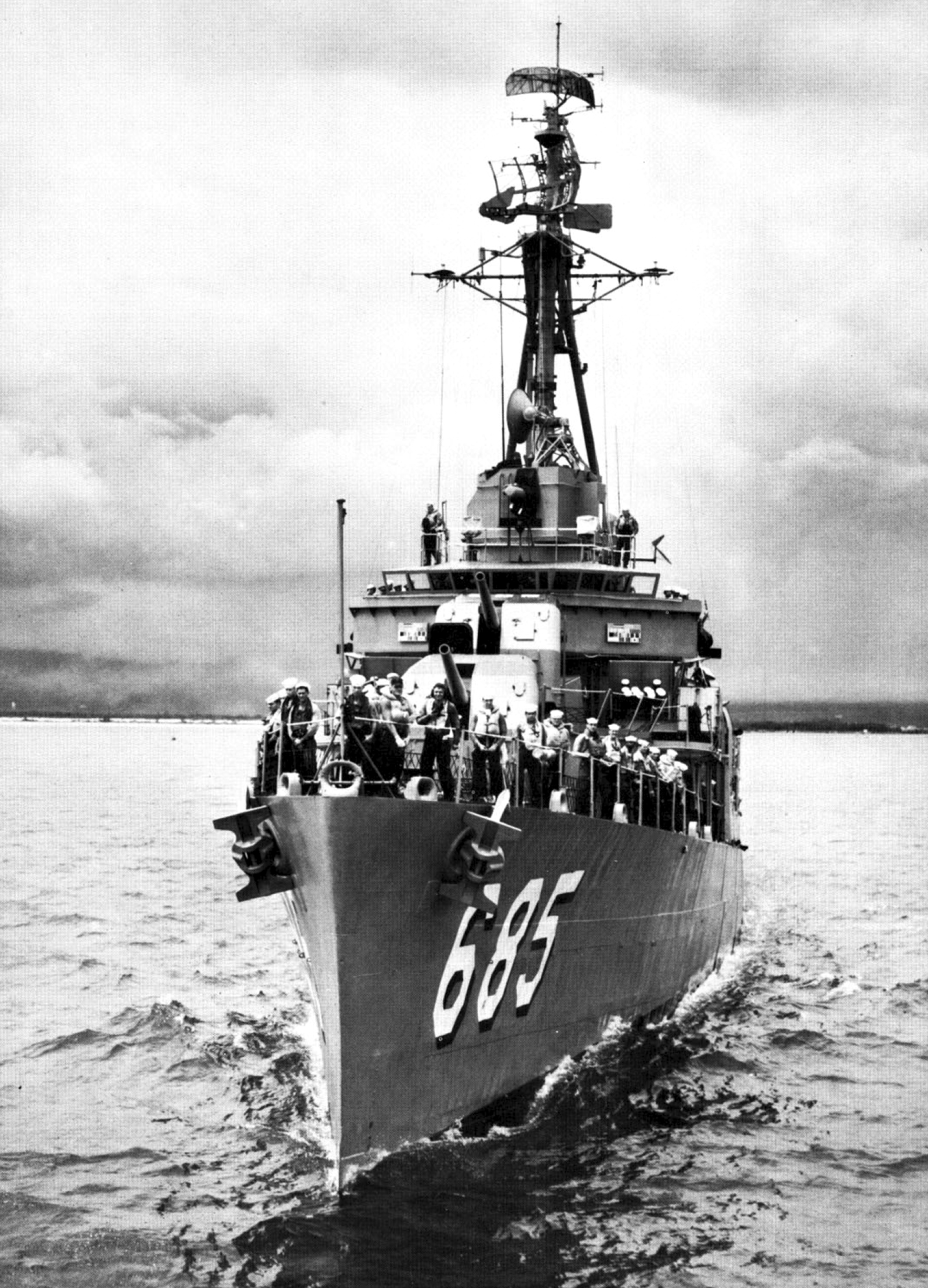
Picking off Oahu, 1963.

In response to the Korean War, Picking recommissioned 26 January 1951. Following duty out of Newport, Rhode Island, she arrived at Yokosuka, Japan, 4 May 1953. Off Korea she operated with Task Forces 77 and 95, conducting shore bombardment with 95 and saved one naval aviator. Upon completion of Korean duty, she departed Sasebo, Japan on 5 August, and proceeded via the Suez Canal to Boston arriving 2 October.

Following stateside operations in 1954, she sailed 5 January 1955 for European and Mediterranean duty. Operating out of Derry, Northern Ireland, she studied British convoy escort techniques, and then served with the 6th Fleet, before returning to Newport 26 May.

Transferred to the Pacific Fleet, she arrived at Long Beach, California, 15 April 1956. She departed 5 June for a tour of duty with the 7th Fleet, which included a Taiwan patrol, and returned to Long Beach 18 November. Departing Long Beach 13 August, she made another tour of the Far East, and returned 24 January 1958. On her next WestPac deployment, 8 October 1958 to 27 March 1959, she operated with an antisubmarine hunter-killer group led by the aircraft carrier Yorktown. During this tour, she carried emergency supplies to the fire-damaged Japanese town of Koniya. In the fall she participated in antisubmarine exercises with Canadian forces off the west coast. From January to June 1960, and from August 1961 to February 1962, she made two more WestPac deployments. During the Cuban Missile Crisis of October 1962, she escorted the aircraft carrier Ranger. East coast operations and training filled 1963.

Deployed to the 7th Fleet on 13 March 1964, she performed escort duty off Vietnam in response to the Gulf of Tonkin incident before returning to Long Beach 2 October. Sailing for WestPac 10 July 1965, she arrived at Dixie Station off Vietnam 11 September. During September and November, she bombarded enemy positions in South Vietnam. She returned to Long Beach 16 December. Following training and local operations in 1966, she departed for WestPac 27 December. She bombarded enemy military, naval, and logistical areas in North and South Vietnam, and destroyed several logistical craft in coastal waters off North Vietnam. Training off the west coast in antisubmarine warfare and gunnery completed 1967. In February 1968 she departed for WestPac, and arrived at Yankee Station 25 April. Following gunfire support duty off South Vietnam and a return to Yankee Station, she arrived Long Beach 17 August.

Following duties with the Pacific Fleet in 1969, Picking decommissioned 6 September 1969 at Long Beach, Calif., and entered the Reserve Fleet. She was stricken from the Navy list 1 March 1975, and sunk as a target 27 February 1997.

== Honors and awards ==
Picking received five battle stars for World War II service. and one battle star for Korean service.
