= John F. Blake =

American intelligence official

Deputy Director of Central Intelligence
- Acting; August 1, 1977 – February 10, 1978
- President: Jimmy Carter
- Preceded by: E. Henry Knoche
- Succeeded by: Frank Carlucci

Personal details
- Born: July 10, 1922 San Francisco, California, U.S.
- Died: March 27, 1995 (aged 72) Arlington County, Virginia, U.S.

John F. Blake (July 10, 1922 – March 27, 1995) was an American intelligence official. Blake worked at the Office of Strategic Services and the Central Intelligence Agency, including serving as Acting Deputy Director of Central Intelligence.

== Early life and education ==
Blake was born in San Francisco, California, on July 10, 1922. He graduated from the University of San Francisco, received a master's degree in international relations from George Washington University, and graduated from the National War College of National Defense University.

== Intelligence career ==
Blake's intelligence career began during World War II when he served in the United States Army. There, he was assigned to the Office of Strategic Services, a wartime intelligence agency of the United States during World War II and a predecessor to the Central Intelligence Agency. Blake was stationed in Washington, D.C., and continued working there after the end of World War II.

In 1947, the Central Intelligence Agency was established and Blake joined. At the CIA, Blake's assignments included a tour of duty in Germany before later switching to administration. He served as director of personnel, director of logistics, assistant inspector general, and Deputy Director for Administration. From August 1977 to February 1978, Blake served as acting Deputy Director of Central Intelligence. He retired from the agency in 1979.

In 1981, Blake was appointed staff director of the U.S. Senate Select Committee on Intelligence. He was chosen by Senator Barry Goldwater.

In 1982, Blake joined Electronic Warfare Associates Inc. of Vienna. He served as vice president for administration there before retiring in 1986.

Blake then became an adjunct professor, teaching at the National Defense Intelligence College (now National Intelligence University) until 1993. He received an honorary doctorate in strategic studies from the college.

Blake was also a former president and director of the Association of Former Intelligence Officers and a former director of the Central Intelligence Retirees Association.

== Honors and awards ==
Blake was awarded the Distinguished Intelligence Medal three times by the CIA and also received the National Civil Service League Career Service Award.

He received an honorary doctorate in strategic studies from the National Defense Intelligence College.

== Personal life and death ==
Blake died of cancer on March 27, 1995, in Arlington County, Virginia. He was married to Frances F. Blake for 46 years and was survived by five daughters.
