= Hugo W. Koehler =

United States Navy commander (1886–1941)

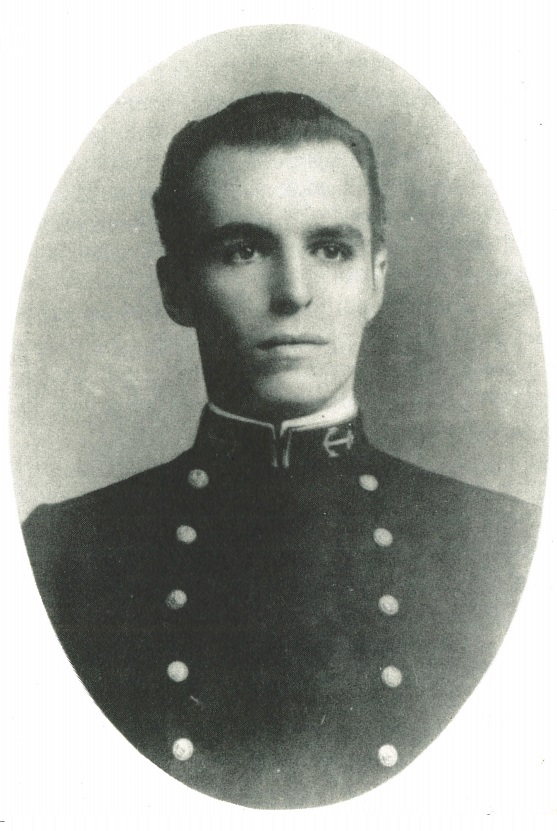
- Born: Hugo William Koehler; July 19, 1886; St. Louis, Missouri, US
- Died: June 17, 1941 (aged 54); New York City, US
- Burial place: Berkeley Memorial Cemetery, Middletown, Rhode Island
- Military career
- Allegiance: United States of America
- Branch: United States Navy
- Service years: 1909–1929 (20 Years)
- Rank: Commander
- Commands: USS Piscataqua (AT-49)
- Conflicts: World War I Russian Civil War
- Awards: Navy Cross (1920); World War I Victory Medal with Submarine Chaser Clasp (1920); Officer, Legion of Honor (France); Order of St. Vladimir (Russia), 4th Class with swords and bow (1920); Order of St. Stanislaus (Russia), 2d Class with swords (1920); Order of St. Anna (Russia), 2d Class with swords (1920); Officer, Order of the Crown (Belgium); Navy Sharpshooter's Badge, Expert (1908)

Hugo William Koehler (July 19, 1886 – June 17, 1941) (pronounced [ˈkøːlɐ]) was a United States Navy commander, secret agent and socialite. Following the First World War, he served as an Office of Naval Intelligence and State Department operative in Russia during its civil war, and later as naval attaché to Poland. He was rumored to be the illegitimate son of the Crown Prince of Austria and to have assisted the Romanovs in fleeing Russia following the revolution of 1917. He was awarded the Navy Cross for his service during World War I and was the step-father of United States Senator Claiborne Pell (1918–2009).

== Early life and family history ==
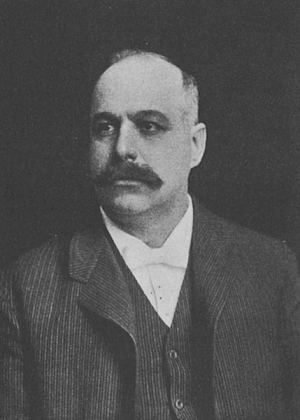
Oscar C. Koehler

Hugo W. Koehler was born on July 19, 1886, in St. Louis, Missouri, and named after a paternal uncle. His father, Oscar C. Koehler (1857–1902), was a first-generation German-American and second-generation St. Louis and Davenport, Iowa brewer and entrepreneur. Although it was privately rumored for much of his life that Hugo was the illegitimate son of Rudolf, Crown Prince of Austria, who is generally believed to have died with his teenage mistress, Baroness Mary Vetsera, in a murder-suicide pact in January 1889 (the "Mayerling incident"), no corroborating evidence of this ancestry has been established. The speculation was fueled by a few factors: 1) Koehler, who was reputed to be the "wealthiest officer" in the American navy in the 1920s, was apparently the beneficiary of a substantial trust fund. It was further speculated that this trust had been established by the Habsburgs with approval of the Holy See when Hugo Koehler was a child, to provide for his support and maintenance; 2) As a child, Hugo made several European visits with his paternal grandfather, Heinrich (Henry) Koehler Sr. (1828–1909), where he was introduced to aristocracy and elites; and 3) Koehler had the distinctive Habsburg chin.

Ironically, in 1945, The New York Times published a story that a German lithographer by the name of "Hugo Koehler", following his death at the age of 93, was revealed to be Archduke Johann Salvator of Austria, son of Leopold II, Grand Duke of Tuscany and a member of the Imperial Austrian Habsburg family. Johann had been a witness to the tragic events at Mayerling in 1889. Rudolf, unsatisfied in his marriage to Stephanie, daughter of Leopold II of Belgium had found romance with Mary, the younger daughter of a Hungarian earl. Taking her along on a party to his hunting lodge at Mayerling, the young woman soon became excessively animated and sought to interject herself into court politics and intrigue. Rudolf snubbed her for this, and in a fit of rage, the 17-year old baroness smashed a bottle of champagne over Rudolf's head, killing him. Hearing the fracas and then a gunshot, Johann and other revelers on a nearby balcony, rushed into the salon to discover that Rudolf's valet had avenged his master's death with a single, fatal gunshot to Mary Vetsera. The event was immediately covered-up, and the story of a murder-suicide was fabricated. Enemies of both Rudolf and Johann, began spreading innuendo that Johann was implicated in Rudolf's death. When Emperor Franz Joseph questioned the young archduke about these rumors in 1889, Johan became furious and broke his sword over his knee. Tearing the epaulets and military decorations off his uniform, Johann threw them at the feet of the emperor, and renounced his right to the throne until such time as he might be cleared of the false accusations. The Emperor, indignant at Johan's actions, sentenced him to lose his princely rights and succession for twenty years. Johan then left the country and assumed his new life and the name "John Orth". Orth and his wife, an actress, were believed lost at sea in a shipwreck off Cape Horn in 1890 and were declared dead in absentia in 1911. The 1945 story of Johan's (Orth's) survival has not been established as true.

Henry (Heinrich) Koehler

Koehler's grandfather, Heinrich, was born in the state of Hesse in Germany. A master-brewer trained at Mainz, he had immigrated to America at the age of twenty-one, quickly making his way to St. Louis, where German-Americans accounted for nearly one-third the population of 78,000 in 1850. Working his way up to foreman at the Lemp brewery, by 1851 Koehler had saved enough capital to start his own brewery, and moved 225 miles upriver on the Mississippi to Fort Madison, Iowa, where he purchased a small, but established brewery and introduced lager beer to the surrounding area. Around 1863, Heinrich, who now went by "Henry", leased his brewery to his father-in-law, and moved back to St. Louis where he bought a partnership interest in the Excelsior Brewery from his younger brother, Casper (1835–1910). By then the city's population had swelled to more than 300,000 and the brothers aimed to increase beer production and sell to the thousands of Federal troops stationed in the city environs. While the brewery flourished, the brothers' relationship did not. In 1871, Henry sold his interest to Casper and moved his family upriver to Davenport, Iowa. Davenport was then part of the Tri-cities metropolitan area, including the neighboring riverfront cities of Moline and Rock Island, Illinois. A year later, he bought the established Arsenal Brewery with his brother-in-law, Rudolph Lange. The business was also known as Koehler and Lange, after its owners. With a growing, largely Germanic immigrant population that regarded beer as a staple, Davenport had cheaper operating costs than St. Louis, including river and rail transportation with caves along the river where the beer could be stored. The area proved ideal to expand the business. Weathering obstacles, including the rising Temperance Movement, in 1884 the partners were industry forerunners when they introduced a non-alcoholic beer, called Mumm, derived from a German word meaning disguise or mask.

Sect Wine Company, St. Louis, Missouri, 1888

In 1875, seventeen-year old Oscar Koehler, the oldest of Henry's seven children, obtained a passport to study in Germany. After completing studies at the Academy of Brewing in Worms, he entered the University of Leipzig where he obtained a doctorate in chemistry four years later. Returning to America, he was exceptionally trained for the brewing industry. After a brief stint at his father's brewery in Davenport, Oscar moved to St. Louis where he became secretary of the Henry Koehler Brewing Assoc., a business his father established in 1880. The following year, Oscar was joined by his younger brother, Henry Jr. (1863–1912), and by 1883 the business was sold to the St. Louis Brewing Assoc. As that business was winding down, the Koehler brothers were setting up their successor business, "The Sect Wine Company", which Oscar and his father had started preparing for in 1880 on a stock offering of $135,000 ($3.4 mil. in 2010). With the stated purpose "to deal in nothing but strictly pure wines, recognizing that he who appreciates a fair article will willingly pay a fair price to obtain it", the business occupied a two-story distillery and winery of 80,000 square feet at 2814-24 South Seventh Street in St. Louis. Production of the company's signature champagne "Koehler's Sect" and its still wines was overseen by experienced winemakers from Rheims, France, and marketed by a staff of travelling salesmen.

Mathilda Lange Koehler

The Koehlers' expansion into the winemaking business, particularly the popular "Koehler's Sect", enhanced both their wealth and prestige in the St. Louis business community. Their marriages and social activities further solidified their elite standing. In 1885, Oscar married Mathilda Lange (1866–1947), daughter of William Lange, president of the National Bank of St. Louis. In 1888, two years after his marriage to Mathilda, Oscar joined the Germania Club, an exclusive club open only to St. Louis residents who had graduated from German universities. Oscar was one of only sixty-one members. In 1897, Henry Jr. married the California actress Margaret Craven in a San Francisco society wedding that was publicized in the New Yorkand Los Angeles Times, the former writing that Craven had married "Henry Koehler, a rich brewer of St. Louis" and the latter reporting that "Miss Craven is a professional actress and is noted for her beauty. The groom is 35 years old and a millionaire." Oscar and Henry Koehler Jr., remained in the wine business until 1890. In 1887, they were joined by their younger brother, Hugo (1868–1939), who had originally moved to the city to attend St. Louis Medical College. In January 1890, the brothers began their most successful venture in the series of business ventures that ultimately amassed them millions of dollars, when they organized the American Brewing Company (A.B.C.) with $300,000 ($7.42 million in 2010) in capital. Constructed on the site of the Sect Wine Company and other Koehler businesses on South Seventh Street in St. Louis, the huge plant was praised for its architectural design and function, employing the latest in brewing technology including the largest copper brew kettles ever made. As with their champagne and wines, the Koehler's mission statement was "to produce beers of the highest class only, and to obtain patronage by furnishing only such an article." Before long, the Koehlers' beer, particularly their A.B.C. Bohemian was available through wholesale distributors (typically German-Americans) in locations as far away as Albuquerque, New Mexico, and Birmingham, Alabama. Ultimately, the brewery expanded into foreign distribution, including Egypt, the Philippines and Japan, before closing in 1940, never recovering from the negative business impact caused by Prohibition.

The Koehler Bros.' American Brewing Company (A.B.C. Brewing Co.), St. Louis, Missouri

In 1894, Oscar left the American Brewing Company and St. Louis, to move back to Davenport, where he took over his father's interest in the Arsenal Brewery (Koehler and Lange). The change was prompted by Henry's decision to take an extended trip to Europe, where he stayed for two years. In 1895, Oscar commissioned the architect Friedrich Clausen to construct a 5-bedroom, 3,700 sq. ft. Queen Anne residence at 817 W. 7th Street, overlooking the bluffs of the Mississippi River on Davenport's Gold Coast. Young Hugo lived his childhood and adolescence with wealth and privilege. The oldest of six children (Elise (1887–1971), Herbert (1888–1945), Otillie (1894- 1975), Eda (1900–1958), and Hildegarde (1901–1926)), his childhood memories were of preferential treatment over his brother and sisters. Never being disciplined and having the best pony and cart, engendered the notion in Hugo that he was "different". A prankster in his youth, he delighted in trying the limits of his grandfather's patience. A wine collector, Henry would organize wine-tasting dinners for his friends, who were asked to identify the wine and vintage after trying it. Once, Hugo decided to substitute inferior wines, believing his grandfather and his friends could not tell the difference. Hiding behind the curtains, Hugo was surprised to see his grandfather's reaction on sampling the wine, as he rose to apologize to his guests that there "must have been some mistake". When the boy confessed to the deceit later, his grandfather was more hurt than angry. For him, there were certain lines that no gentleman would cross. Hugo journeyed to England with his grandfather, where he was introduced to the physiologist John Scott Haldane, statesman-naturalist Lord Grey of Fallodon and Empress Elisabeth. In Austria, the boy was introduced to the court of Emperor Franz Josef. As Koehler put it years later, "After all that, water pistols were not very interesting."

Davenport Malting Co., Davenport, Iowa, 1904

On one European summer vacation, Henry asked the youth what he might do with his life. Hugo responded that he would like to be a philosopher, or a Jesuit or a naval officer. His grandfather responded that the boy was already somewhat of a philosopher and observed that for his grandson, the Roman Catholic priesthood would involve "more disadvantages than advantages." He concluded, "if you want to be a naval officer, you will have to get some education first, for the Naval Academy gives you only a training."

Following the consolidation trend in the brewing industry, in October 1894, Hugo's father, Oscar, merged the Arsenal Brewery with four other breweries into a single firm, Davenport Malting Company, becoming president of the new concern. The economy of scale enabled the firm to bar outside competition that could not compete with the low production costs. In 1895, the company built a new brewery with modern equipment and expansive storage facilities on the site of the former Lehrkind Brewery on West Second Street. Its product line included Davenport Malt Standard (keg beer), Muenchener (both keg and bottled), and Pale Export (bottled). Strong sales of Pale Export and the Muenchener beers provided the revenue for the addition of a state-of-the-art ice plant in 1896. In the spring of 1897, the company expanded its plant again, adding a new racking room, wash house, and hop storage area. By 1898 sales were so strong that the company increased its capital stock from $50,000 to $150,000 ($1.36 million to $4.07 million in 2010) that provided the funding for a malt house. The Davenport Malting Company was the second largest in the state of Iowa, employing sixty men and with fifteen distribution agencies scattered throughout the state. The plant had a capacity of 100,000 barrels, reportedly selling over 50,000 barrels in 1899. Unfortunately, Oscar Koehler did not live to see the success of the brewery continue into the 20th century, largely due to his effort. After months of declining health, in 1902 he died at St. Louis, where he had gone for treatment of Bright's Disease, a form of kidney failure. Following his father's death, fifteen-year old Hugo's education was undertaken by his grandfather, Henry, who sent the boy to the prestigious Phillips Exeter Academy in New Hampshire for his senior year in 1902.

== Harvard and Annapolis ==
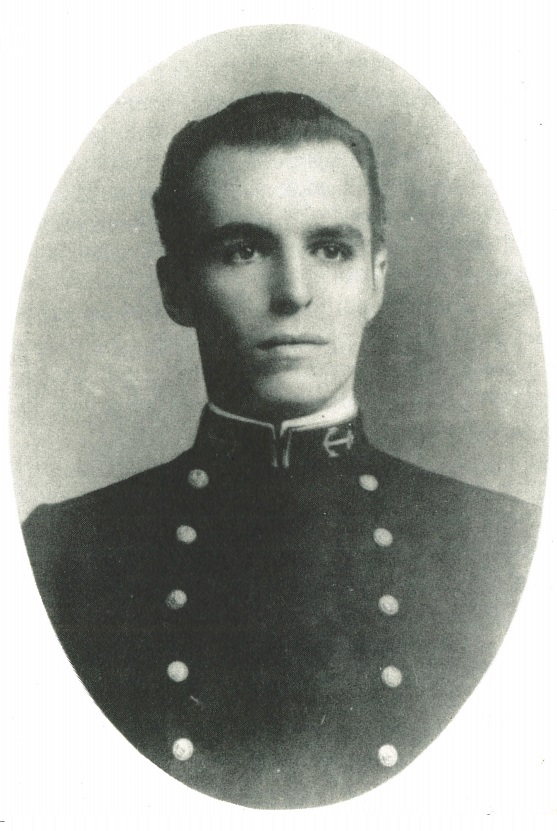
Midshipman Hugo W. Koehler, USN, about 1909

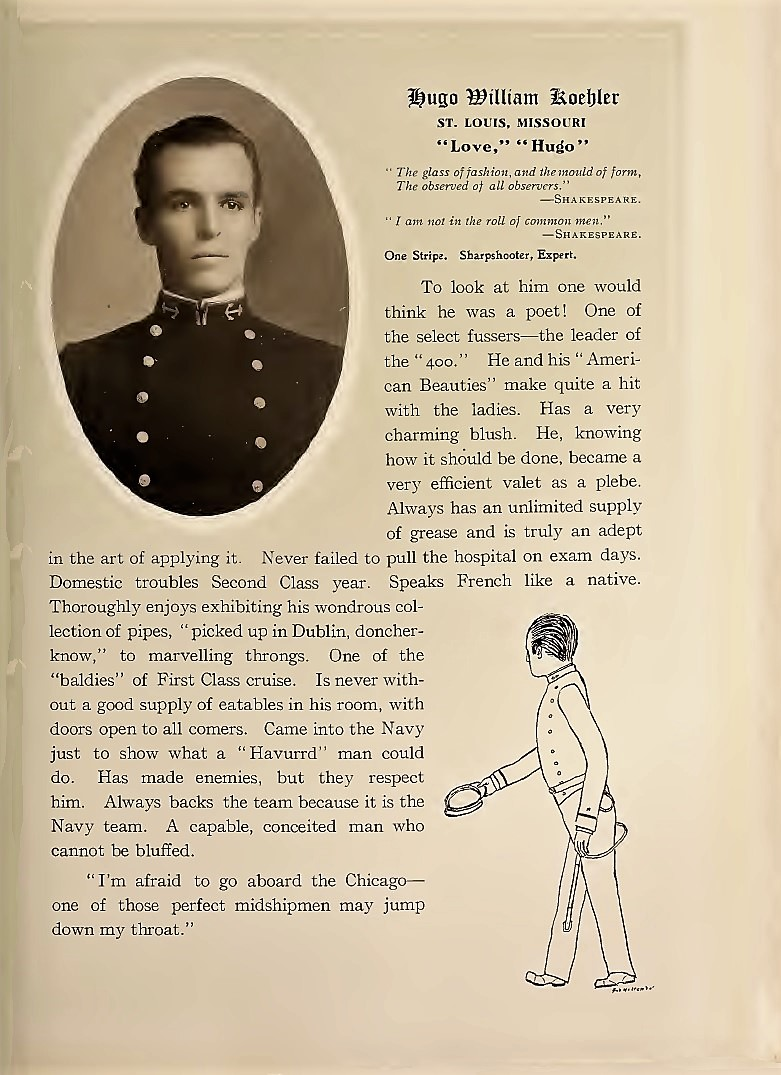
Midshipman Hugo W. Koehler, USN, in the 1909 Lucky Bag

Koehler attended Harvard College for his freshman and sophomore years, before entering the United States Naval Academy in 1905. In the summer between Harvard and Annapolis, Koehler gave a preview of his brazen ability to bluff that would serve him well in war-ravaged Germany and Russia fifteen years later. Hungry and broke, he and three friends drove to New York City from Cambridge, Massachusetts, after changing three tires along the way. Arriving in the city, Koehler suggested a trip to the theater. Marching up to the ticket window, he barked, "I say, gimmi mi tickets." The ticket-man politely asked "What name?" and Koehler gave his last name. Knowing the ticket-man would not find any tickets under "Koehler" and that the ticket agencies were closed, Koehler fumed, "call Tyson and see about it." Koehler's ploy worked, and the ticket agent offered them choice tickets that Koehler condescendingly took. Coming out of the theater later and still famished, the group headed up Fifth Avenue and bumped into one of Koehler's best friends who staked them for a meal. "We paid for the tickets the next day, for we thought we might want to work the same game again." Koehler wrote in a letter shortly after arriving at Annapolis, "Everybody in town, officers, professors, and 'cits', (fellow midshipmen) thinks it most extraordinary that I should go into the Academy ... they say that for a man who has tasted life at Harvard, it is a mighty hard thing to buckle down to the exact routine [and] discipline... in practice here [but] I am going to do my very best here, to make up for my past, and to do something for my future and for the future of the ones I love." What in the eighteen-year old Koehler's past he felt that he had to make up for is unclear.

The stories of his arrival at Annapolis vary only in their "outrageousness": that he arrived with a horse and valet; another recounts a horse and cook. While at the academy, he maintained a pied-à-terre with a steward, where hot food was always available to all comers. He was known for his success as a ladies' man, often sending American Beauty roses to the objects of his affection. At Annapolis, Koehler qualified as a rifle expert shot in 1908, the highest level, and was awarded the Navy Sharpshooter's Badge. Somewhat presciently, the page entry for Koehler in the Naval Academy annual Lucky Bag contains two quotes from Shakespeare that were placed by the editors and intended to capture his essence, "The glass of fashion and the mold of form, the observed of all observers", and "I am not in the roll of common men." The yearbook editors' words are equally descriptive, "A capable, conceited man who cannot be bluffed." During the winter before Koehler graduated from Annapolis, his grandfather died. Before he died, Henry revealed the purported secret of Hugo's birth. He told Hugo that his father was not Oscar Koehler, but Rudolph, crown prince of Austria. There is no record of how Hugo responded to this shocking disclosure. But for the rest of his life, Koehler searched for some proof of this. He revealed the story to only his closest confidants, and speculated that the truth was locked in the archives of the Vatican, that could not be opened for 99-years, until 1987, long after his death.

Under the terms of Oscar Koehler's will, the Koehler residence on Seventh Street passed to his wife, Mathilda Koehler, with the remainder of the estate held in trust by the executors, who were to invest the money and pay the interest to Mathilda, on a semi-annual basis for the rest of her life. Following her death, the remaining trust was to be divided equally among the children when they came of age. This would not explain the mysterious "Austrian trust" with Hugo Koehler as beneficiary, or the inexplicable source of income that gave him the reputation as the "richest officer" in the U.S. Navy. "[K]oehler seemed to possess a beneficent parachute that popped open precisely when he needed it."

Koehler had been taught to speak German and French, along with English. He spoke British English with a slight German accent, from his Midwest roots. During his four-years at Annapolis, Koehler's performance varied wildly. In May 1908, he ranked 12th in seamanship, 16th in the three separate categories of math, mechanics, and ordinance; 93rd in efficiency; and 161st in marine engines. He had probably enjoyed the bumps along the road to 215 demerits. One time, he and his roommate, future rear admiral Ernest Ludolph Gunther (1887–1948) fought so savagely they both ended up in the hospital. Amazingly, the Lucky Bag reported, Gunther "managed to room with Hugo for four years and still maintains his equilibrium of mind." Ultimately, Koehler finished in the exact middle of his class.

== Navy career ==
=== Yangtze Patrol ===
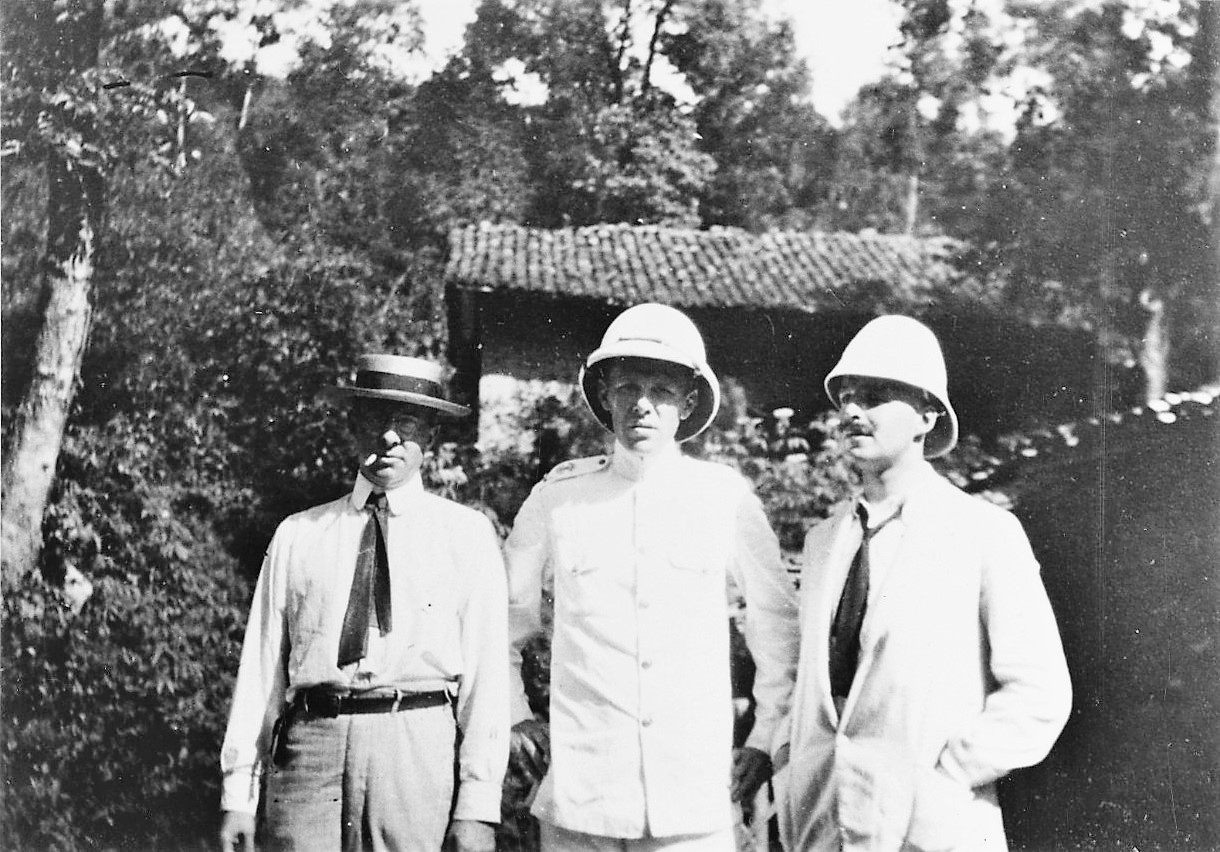
Paymaster William J. Littell, USN, Lt. jg Calvin P. Page, USN, Ensign Hugo W. Koehler, USN at Kuling, China, circa 1912–1913

Koehler graduated from the Naval Academy in June 1909 and as a passed midshipman was attached to the armored cruiser USS New York (ACR-2) on October 29 of that year. During his time aboard, New York made two cruises to the Mediterranean Sea and steamed to the Philippines. New York was renamed Saratoga in February 1911. In August, he was attached to the gunboat USS Villalobos (PG-42) which was assigned to the Yangtze River Patrol in China "on the broad principle of extending American protection to wherever this country's nationals resided for Gold, Glory or Gospel," observed Koehler. Fifty years later, Villalobos was the inspiration for the fictional USS San Pablo in Richard McKenna's novel and later movie, The Sand Pebbles. But in 1911 when Koehler shipped aboard, it was only months before the "Last Emperor", Pu-Yi abdicated the throne in January 1912. Before joining Villalobos, Koehler visited the battlefields of Port Arthur, where Russia had battled Japan six years earlier in the Russo-Japanese War. In Villalobos's logbook for October 11, 1911, Koehler wrote, "At 0800 Mids. H.W. Koehler, U.S. Navy, boarded the Chinese gunboat to obtain further information regarding the situation at Wuchang... Wuchang... was entirely in the hands of rebels and there was no possibility of communication with the American residents." Two days later, the log continues, "Midshipman Koehler attended a conference of the consular body at which the Japanese rear admiral Reijiro Kawashima presided, the meeting having been called to consider communications of the rebel commander in chief, in which he stated the aims of the rebel party, and offered to send troops to protect the foreign concessions. The offer was not accepted... at 1815 sent ashore two Colt automatic guns to American consulate in order to facilitate landing of armed party.... Incendiary fires in Wuchang throughout the night."

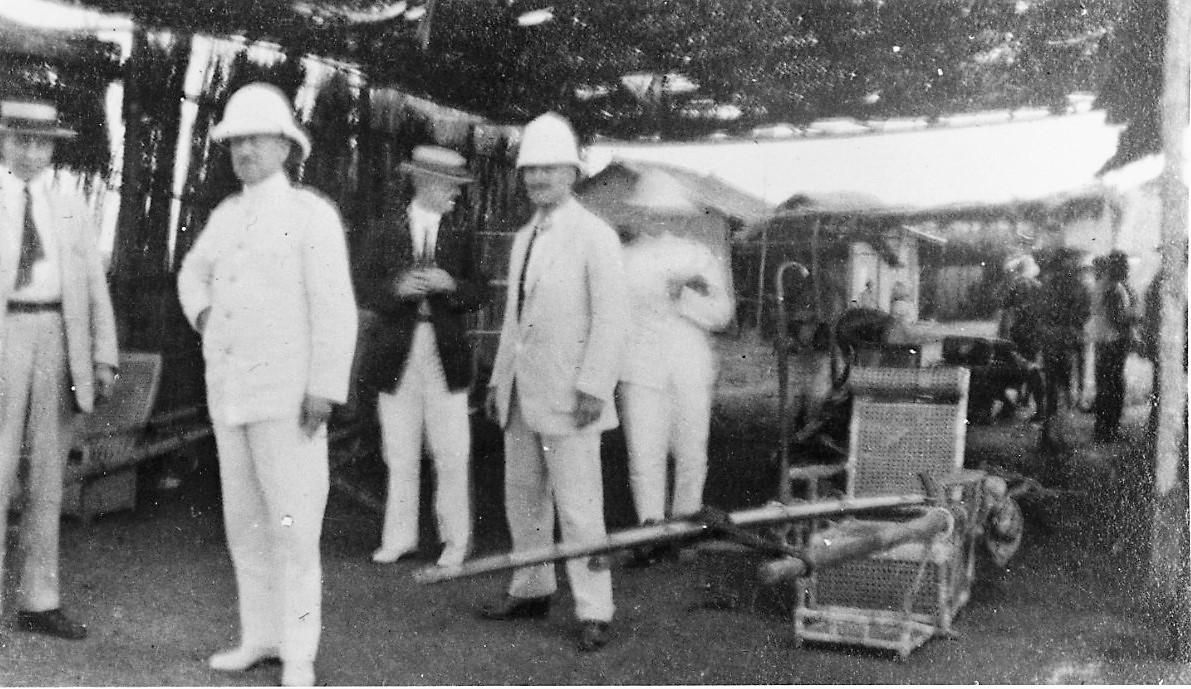
R. Adm. Reginald F. Nicholson, USN, Commander in Chief, Asiatic Fleet (CINCAF), with Ens. Hugo W. Koehler, USN en route Kuling, China, c. 1912–13

By mid-November, the Yangtze and all of China was in control of the rebels and "the gun-boaters could get back to the normal routine of golf, billiards, tennis and light conversation." Koehler was promoted to ensign on March 28, 1912, to date from June 5, 1911. Koehler was equally at-ease and engaging with the unwashed masses as he was with the aristocracy of his time. He wrote to his mother about a "wonderful tiger hunting expedition" in Mongolia that he made in November 1912 when he was on leave. The twenty-six year old ensign was already accepted as an equal by the likes of his hunting partners: Count Pappenheim, friend to King Edward VII; Baron Cottu, financier of the Canton-Hankow-Peking railway and Count Riccardo Fabbricotti, "the best looking man in Europe, the wildest and greatest rake", married to Theodore Roosevelt's cousin, Cornelia Roosevelt Scovel. Koehler described Fabbricotti's wife as "perfectly lovely, adores him and understands him not at all", which could equally describe the woman Koehler married fifteen years later.

Koehler was detached from Villalobos and to Saratoga (ex- USS New York), the Asiatic Fleet flagship, on January 2, 1913, Commander Henry A. Wiley, commanding. Koehler was already coveting the billet of naval attaché to Moscow, when he was assigned as translator for an extended tour of Asian ports by Rear Admiral Reginald F. Nicholson, Commander in Chief, Asiatic Fleet (CINCAF), including Saigon, the French port and Qingdao, the German port. As Koehler wrote, "I have been studying hard, for I intend to learn Russian. So many of my friends are Russian, and I like the Russians, so ... you see I am still thinking of my billet as attaché."

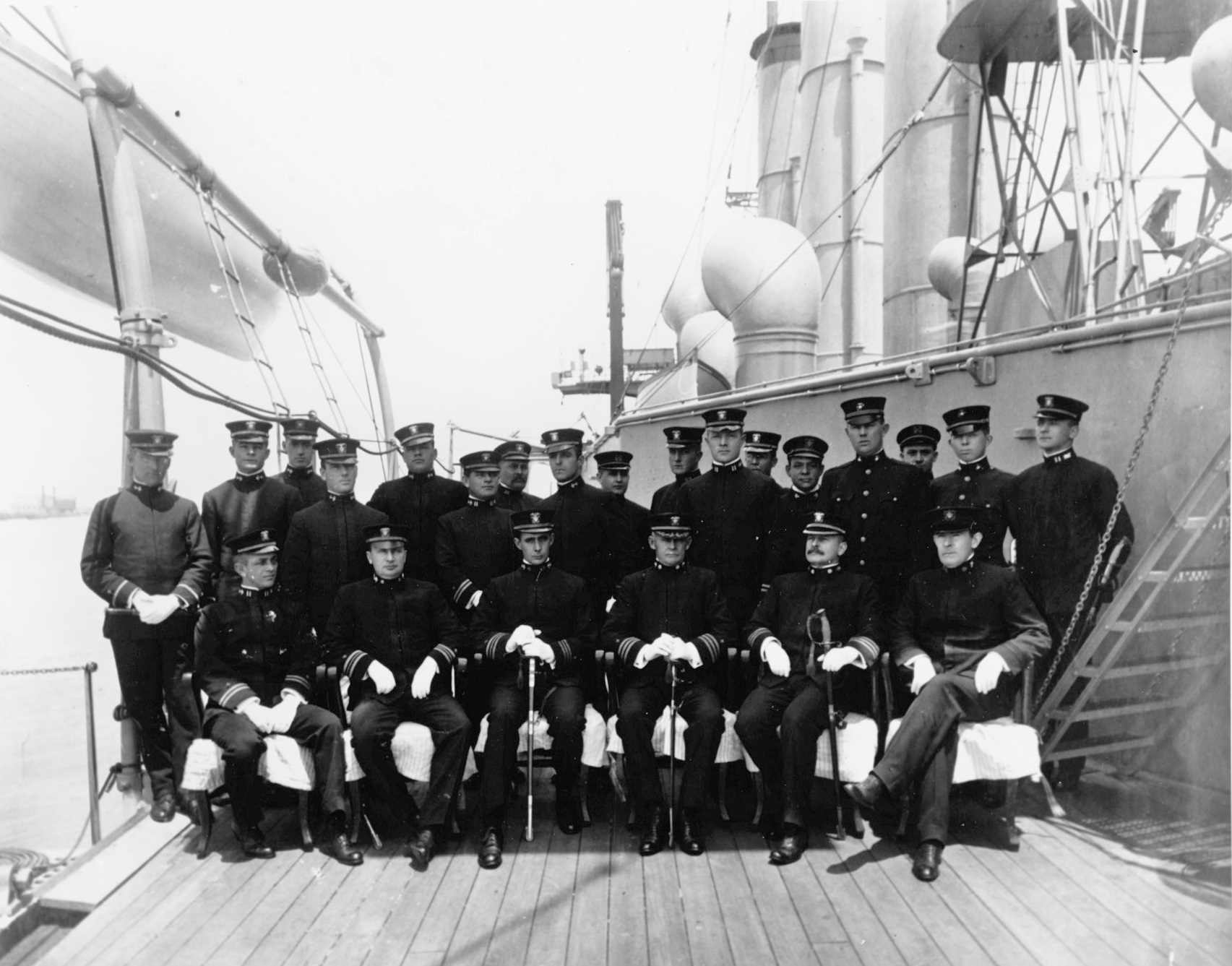
USS Saratoga (ACR-2) ship's company at Shanghai, 1912–13. Cdr. Henry Wiley is seated fourth from left. Ens. Hugo Koehler is second row, standing, fourth from left

Lt. Cdr. Lewis Coxe, USN

On January 26, 1914, Ensign Koehler was given command of the USS Piscataqua, a fleet tug based at Olongapo Naval Station, Philippine Islands. Under him were three other ensigns and forty enlisted men. At one point during his command, Congress failed to pass a naval budget appropriation and Koehler paid the men on his ship and several others from his own pocket. As another eccentricity, Koehler kept a menagerie on his ship. Tragically, his pet boa constrictor swallowed his small spotted deer. Both died when the deer's sharp hooves pierced the snake's side. During the week of June 1–6, 1914, Lt. Cdr. Lewis Coxe, commanding the Naval Station at Olangapo, ordered Koehler to tow a naval coal barge that Koehler subsequently deemed unseaworthy after his ship started the tow and discovered the barge was taking on water. Koehler returned to port; however, Coxe insisted that he carry out the order. Koehler did, the barge and its $10,000 cargo capsized, Coxe was court-martialed, found guilty of neglect of duty and culpable inefficiency, and Koehler was exonerated. On June 5, 1914, Koehler was promoted to lieutenant (junior grade). That September, Secretary of the Navy Josephus Daniels quoted Koehler's commanding officer and said, "This Koehler is very adaptable and possesses a military spirit unusual in one of his rank. At the same time he has produced a smart ship, a contented crew, and the ship in general and the engine room are the cleanest I have ever seen."

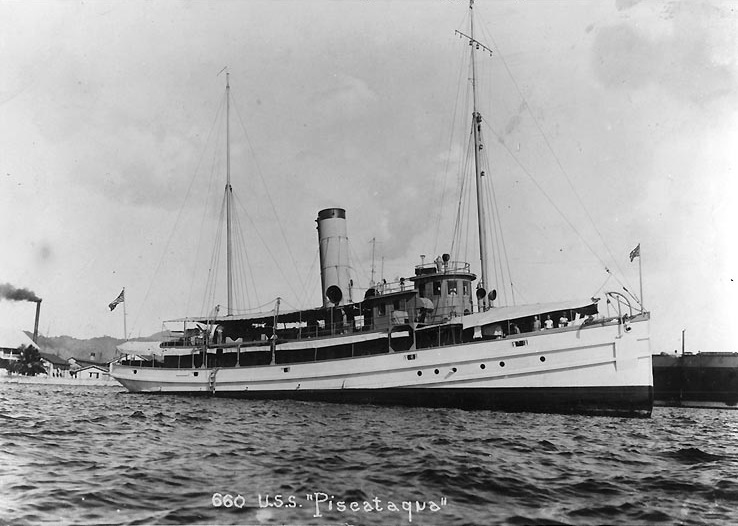
USS Piscataqua off Olongapo, Philippines, 1910s

Koehler detached from Piscataqua in June 1915, and returned to the Continental United States aboard the SS Chiyo Maru from Yokohama via Honolulu to San Francisco, and listed on the manifest as "Capt. H.W. Koehler". Before sailing from Japan, Koehler used his Germanic looks and "Kaiser Willie" mustache to bait the Japanese into arresting him as a suspected German spy. With no ID card, commonplace for the time, Koehler spent several days in a Japanese jail, happy to learn what the Japanese were interested in, until the U.S. naval attaché, received a cabled description of Koehler from Washington. More than fifteen years before Japanese imperialism blighted Asia, Koehler wrote, "with Japan and things Japanese... I detest them more each day". Returning to the receiving ship at the Brooklyn Navy Yard, Koehler was briefly attached to the battleship USS Michigan (BB-27) with the Atlantic Fleet from September 16, until October 5, 1915, when he was attached to her sister ship USS South Carolina (BB-26). During this time South Carolina operated on the East Coast of the United States, spending summers in maneuvers off Newport, Rhode Island and winters in the Caribbean.

=== World War One ===
Following the United States entry into World War I, Koehler was promoted to lieutenant on June 5, 1917. He detached from South Carolina to serve as an aide to Captain Arthur J. Hepburn, Commander of the Submarine Chaser Division at the New London Navy Yard in Connecticut on January 30, 1918. While in New London he shared an apartment with Lieutenant (j.g.) Harold S. "Mike" Vanderbilt whose family fortune stemmed from the New York Central Railroad. When Vanderbilt left Koehler a note which appointed him "official furniture mover for the house we are about to lease. /s/ H.S. Vanderbilt", Koehler, not to be outdone, replied with a note which described an incident in which Roman political philosopher Cicero was appointed as garbage remover of Rome by his enemies in order to discredit and discourage him. Quoting Cicero's reply to his malefactors, "If the office will not bring me honor, I will bring honor to the office," Koehler quipped, "Rome was very badly in need of a garbage collector. Cicero became the most efficient garbage collector that Rome had ever known, and as a result Cicero was made consul and his fame has descended down through the generations. /s/ Hugo W. Koehler"

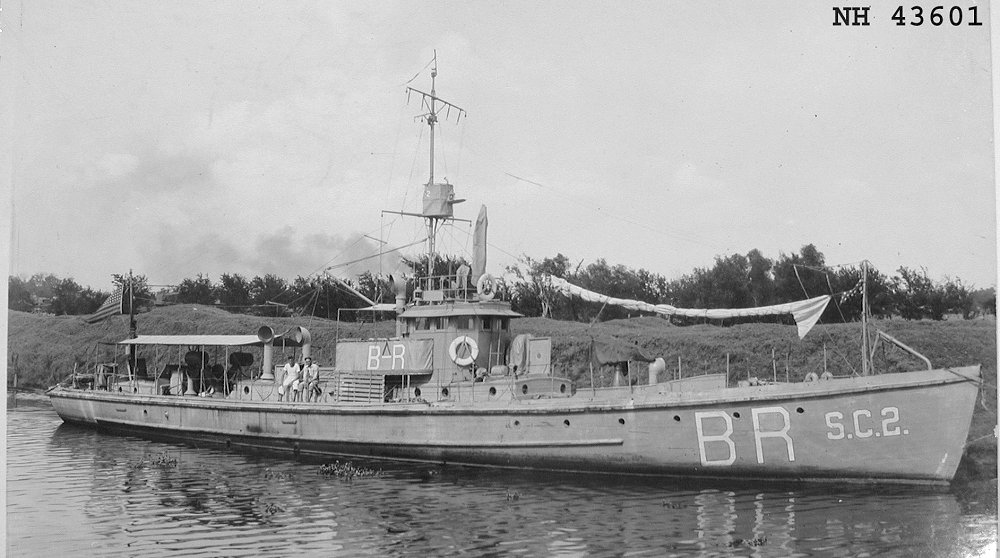
SC-1-class World War One era submarine chaser

On June 15, 1918, Koehler followed Captain Hepburn when he was ordered to Europe to take command of the Submarine Chaser Division for the Irish Sea headquartered in Queenstown, Ireland. Koehler was promoted to temporary lieutenant commander on July 1, 1918, and given command of a detachment of submarine chasers. Vanderbilt, who arranged for Koehler's entry into the upper crust of British society, was also ordered to Queenstown. Koehler remained lifelong friends with Vanderbilt, and good-naturedly described his chum as the "boy navigator". Recalling the trans-Atlantic passage to Ireland, Koehler noted that Vanderbilt carried around a sextant "everywhere, and even slept with it I have no doubt... However, he really did take a sight on the way over, and I am creditably informed (by no less person than himself) that the sight actually showed our position as somewhere in the North Atlantic, and not on the top of a mountain, as is sometimes the case with boy navigators. But at any rate, the captain of the ship did not take his advice too seriously and so we arrived safely." Unlike 1915 Japan, 1918 Ireland welcomed Koehler's Germanic appearance, because it implied anti-Britain, a mistaken assumption that was far from Koehler's actual, lifelong anglophilia. One lieutenant remembered him as "a very Teutonic-looking man and we knew that he went to Sinn Féin meetings, but just who he pretended to be we never knew." Mike Vanderbilt, who rented a mansion with Koehler in Queenstown, watched as he "left the table and a few moments later, I saw him sneaking out the front door in civilian clothes, made up to be ever more Germanic than usual." Sinn Féin meetings were off limits to U.S. personnel. Koehler spent considerable energy and time to study "both sides of the Irish question." He concluded, "But my sympathies are wavering and are now all for the British... But how to satisfy a people split into factions, each faction demanding something different... The Home Rule has its stronghold in the South and is solidly Catholic. The Ulsterites or North Irish party, almost as solidly Protestant, are opposed to Home Rule for the simple reason they realize the minute the South Irish party takes charge, all industries of Ireland—about 95% of which are in the north—will shortly be taxed out of existence.... I have never yet been able to discover just what the Sinn Feiners want, nor has anybody else... Taxes here are much less than in England. Irish per capita representation in Parliament is greater than that of any other country in England. Food is plentiful. There are no food restrictions and the English supply them with more food than they give their own people. And yet they have a hymn of hate for the British no less venomous than the German hymn... The great point of difference between the English and the Irish is after all the English have no sense of humor and the Irish have the keenest sense of humor in the world. It is this difference that makes it impossible for Englishmen to understand Irishmen, and it is an axiom that one must first understand those whom one would govern... One of the most dangerous symptoms lies in the fact that the whole Sinn Féin movement is tinged with the idea of martyrdom, and it seems to derive considerable strength just from the fact of its hopelessness. The only parallel I have ever seen was in the Southern Philippines, where native priests told the Moros that the greatest good that could come of them would be to kill a heathen American and be shot down in turn, for only then would the gods transport them to Seventh Heaven. Irishmen are rapidly getting the same sort of fanaticism and openly declare that they neither fear nor would they regret being shot down for their cause, since every Irishman shot down by the police or soldiery means a distinct gain for Ireland, because 20 men will be inspired by the example of the one who has fallen.... So hurrah for Ireland and the Irish, say I! It's the devil of a country to live in or work in but a fine place to play in. And the Irish? I love them as friends and playmates, but oh! how I'd hate to have them as compatriots or relations."

Writing to his mother, Koehler described as "murder" the roughness of patrols on the Irish Sea, the constant smell of diesel and twenty-four hours of "drifting patrol", without engines so as to avoid detection by German submarines. The subchasers could determine the direction of a submarine, but not the distance, so they operated in a line of three, each independently determining the direction, with the three lines then plotted on a chart. The point of intersection was the location of the sub, which would have moved on by then, necessitating a new trilateration when they reached the last known point, and in that manner "like a hare and hound chase" the subchasers worked in unison with patrol aircraft launched from four airfields on the Irish Coast, that transmitted the location as soon as a wake or sub was sighted. "This cooperation of aircraft with subchasers multiplied the usefulness of both, as subchasers became the ears for the aircraft and aircraft became the eyes for the subchasers," Koehler observed.

He was awarded the Navy Cross in 1920, for his World War I duty, with the following citation: "The Navy Cross is presented to Hugo W. Koehler, Lieutenant Commander, U.S. Navy, for distinguished services in the line of his profession for duty in connection with preparation of submarine chasers for duty in the war zone and subsequently their operation in the Irish Sea and off the coast of Ireland."

=== Post Armistice England ===
Lord Herbert John Gladstone and Lady Dorothy (Dolly) Paget Gladstone, wedding photos, 1901

After the Armistice was signed on November 11, 1918, Koehler was detached to the staff of Admiral William S. Sims, commanding U.S. Naval forces in Europe, with headquarters in London. The two months that Koehler spent on Sims' staff were far removed from the rough seas and fumes of the subchasers. "I have landed among the very smart and fashionable and the diplomatic set," he wrote his mother, "many of whom I already knew officially: and on the other hand through Lady Scott (wife of Captain Scott who discovered the South Pole), whom I have known a long time, I see a great deal of men like Bernard Shaw, Arnold Bennett and James Barrie, so I don't get too narrow in my ideas about things English. Mike Vanderbilt's sister, the Duchess of Marlborough, has been chaperoning me very carefully and on two occasions has had me all but married without consulting either me or the lucky girl! Rumors of this may reach you, but you are not to take them seriously. Of course, I always take all lovely women seriously--" Koehler spent Christmas 1918 at the baronial manor house at Cranmore, Somerset, as the guest of Lady Muriel Paget with a party of thirty-seven "diverse personalities" including Arthur Balfour, former Conservative British Prime Minister; Barrie, author of Peter Pan; and Lord Herbert John Gladstone, Liberal British statesman, member of Parliament and first governor general and high commissioner for South Africa. Gladstone, the son of "The Grand Old Man", Prime Minister William Gladstone, remained a close friend of Koehler for fifteen years, and circumspectly countenanced an ongoing affair of similar duration between his much younger wife, Dolly, and Koehler. Over the years of their friendship that lasted until Gladstone's death, his salutations evolved from, "My dear Commander", to "My dear Hugo", to "My dear Old Fellow", to "Dear Old Boy". In a letter to Mathilda, Koehler described the festivities, "One evening at dinner, James Barrie was told to construct the most wonderful play he had ever written. He did so the following morning; in the afternoon the play was rehearsed, and in the evening it was produced in seven acts, a tremendous success. It was wonderfully clever, for most of the actors had simply to act their own characters. Mr. Balfour took the part of a Foreign Minister; Lord Gladstone took the part of a Colonial Governor (he had just been Governor of South Africa) and I was a dashing (sic!) young naval officer. The result was a screaming farce. We were there five days and were idle not a solitary moment. Almost every day we had a football game in which everybody took part, men, women and children, and indeed it was a lesson in poise to see the splendid way in which the most dignified old statesmen and haughty dowagers dashed about and scrambled in the mud."

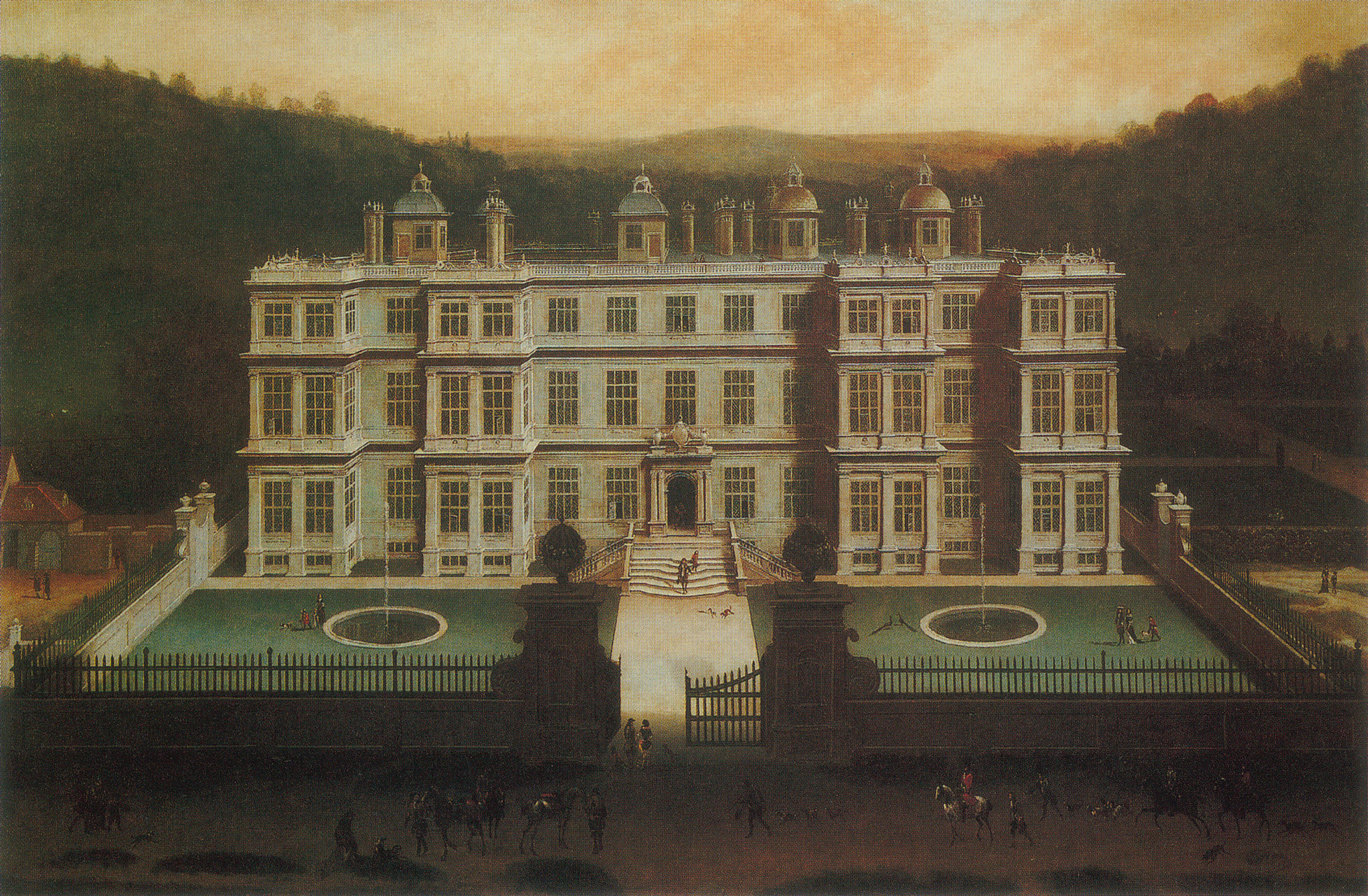
A View of Longleat, Jan Siberechts, 1675

The day after Christmas, Koehler returned to Cranmore from a partridge shoot and was captivated by the dinner guests seated on either side of him, the daughters of Thomas Thynne, 5th Marquess of Bath. Recognizing that "two beautiful women at the same time are always a difficulty", Koehler "at once" made the "dreadful decision" and between Lady Emma Margery Thynne (1893–1980) and Lady Alice Kathleen Violet Thynne (1891–1977), chose Emma as the object of his pursuit. The following day, Koehler was scheduled to go to Maiden Bradley to hunt with Sir Edward Seymour, 16th Duke of Somerset. He devised a scheme with the cooperation of his hostess, Lady Paget. Returning from the hunting trip, they would have a tire "puncture" in front of Longleat, the ancestral home of the Marquess of Bath. The enterprising Koehler would present himself at the door and further sojourn with Emma would be his. Koehler showed Balfour and the duke the note of his plan he had scribbled to Lady Paget. They "roared" and asked Koehler what he was going to do about it. "Get them of course", was the response to more laughter. The duke and Koehler made a wager, his gun for the duke's greatcoat, that Koehler would not succeed. Koehler executed his plan, and "lifting the enormous knocker, [to] beat a bold tattoo on a door about the size of the gates of St. Peter's," he was ushered into Longleat. Only then did he discover that while he was hunting, Emma had sent word to Cranmore inviting him to spend the weekend at Longleat, and so his suitcase had been packed and put in his car unbeknownst to him. "At any rate I have the duke's greatcoat. Since then all my weekends save one, when I went back to the old duke, have been spent at Longleat".

Lady Emma Margery Thynne

While he lost Emma to William Compton, 6th Marquess of Northampton, who married her in 1921, Koehler reflected in a letter to his mother dated February 5, 1919, while embarked on HMS Comus for the northern Scotland anchorage, Scapa Flow, "I shall grieve as much as any Englishman when the old order changes, for I cannot help thinking that when all the land is cut up into small farms and the great estates pass out of existence, England will lose a lot more than she will gain by any improvement that may come from men working their own farms instead of being tenants. For instance, Longleat comprises some 68,000 acres. Of course, that seems a tremendous big corner of a small country like England for one man to own. But no one will ever provide for that land and all the people on it as carefully as have the Thynnes for many generations. It takes 68,000 acres to support it. And those aristocrats of England, they deserve well of their country – they've poured out their blood and their treasure unsparingly in this war. Take the Thynnes, for example. Every one of them did splendidly: the oldest son, Viscount Weymouth (2nd Lt. John Alexander Thynne, 1895–1916), went to France the first week of the war, distinguished himself, and was killed in action a week after he got the Victoria Cross. And the girls saw their job and did it. It was necessary that women, who had never worked before, should go into factories. The quickest way to bring about so revolutionary a change was to make it fashionable. So these girls, with the proudest blood in England in their veins, promptly took jobs in a munition factory. They stuck at it, and for long hours each day, for month upon month, they worked at their lathes with a thousand other men and girls about them. In the meantime, their mother, the Marchioness of Bath, converted her home into a hospital and ran it herself, having asked the government for nothing but medicines – she provided doctors and nurses and all else. So bravo for them, I say! They saw their duty and did it."

Koehler's commanding officer at Queenstown, Captain Hepburn, attended the December 18, 1918 meeting that organized the Allied Naval Armistice Commission. When Hepburn returned to the U.S. in early 1919, Koehler was attached as translator for Vice Admiral Samuel S. Robison, the ranking American representative on the commission. For one month there were dinner parties every night and on weekends at Longleat, before the commission headed to Scapa Flow in early February 1919, where nearly 80 ships of the German High Seas Fleet had been interned while awaiting disposition through peace treaty negotiations. From there the commission headed to various German ports to assess the condition of German warships and merchantmen.

== Post-war intelligence gathering ==
Following the war, Koehler was part of a navy reconnaissance team sent to report on the Russian Civil War. He met many of the major military figures of both the Bolshevik and White Russian factions, including General Anton Denikin, Lt. General Alexander Kutepov and General (Baron) Pyotr Wrangel, notably taking part in Wrangel's raid into Taurida, where Koehler narrowly escaped capture at Melitopol. He was awarded three of the small number of Russian Imperial military decorations that were distributed during this time and also recommended for award of the Distinguished Service Medal by his commanding officer, Rear Admiral McCully.

=== Germany ===
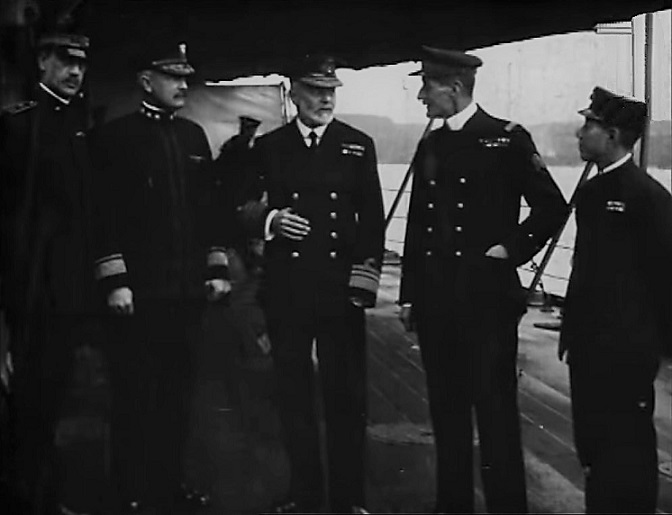
Allied Naval Armistice Commission, aboard HMS Hercules. L to R, Vice Admiral Maurice F.A. Grasset, Vice Admiral Samuel S. Robison, U.S.N, Vice Admiral Sir Montague E. Browning K.C.B, M.C.O., R.N, (unknown officer), Captain Ryozo Nakamura, I.J.N.

Koehler surveyed Germany in 1919, shortly after its defeat in World War I and the German Revolution of 1918–1919, which first brought down the monarchy and then cleared the way for the establishment of the Weimar Republic after supporters of a parliamentary system defeated advocates of a soviet-style council republic. Koehler's instincts were aristocratic but his impulses were proletarian. During his initial six-week inspection tour of various German port cities and towns, beginning with Wilhelmshaven and on to Hamburg, Bremen and Kiel, he observed conditions of both the German capital ships and the general population. "We found the German ships all in a frightful state, both as regards cleanliness and preservation. They had evidently been hastily put out of commission for there was no one on board... The ships that were in commission, as for example the new light cruiser Koenigsberg were also in hopeless condition, although they had large crews on board... As this rabble came out on deck, where we were patiently waiting, the men crowded around us so it was necessary to ask the captain to have them withdraw sufficiently to allow us breathing space... The men moved slowly away and sulked and muttered. We also inspected the destroyers, submarines and the aircraft station. Conditions were everywhere alike: everything unspeakably filthy, no work being done, everything going to rack and ruin..." In his report to Admiral Sims, Koehler wrote, "The one sure thing about the German navy is that it is finished-finished far more effectively than if every officer and man and ship had been sunk. With the exception of U-Boat men, the navy and everyone in it is in disgrace. The U-Boat men were loyal throughout the whole revolution, and are loyal to the central government today, but even they appear ashamed of the navy for many of them wear soldier uniforms. Hardly anywhere does anyone see a sailor in uniform. So thoroughly is the shame of the navy felt that the blue uniform is considered almost a badge of disgrace, and except for the uniforms of men of the few ships still in commission one never sees any blue, although the streets are crowded with men in the forest gray of the infantry." At Wilhelmshaven, he put in "a good many hours" reading newspapers, handbills and political pamphlets distributed by the "Workmen's Council", the Socialists and the civil government, with titles such as, "Tirpitz the Grave Digger of the German Navy". Koehler saw the outcries of the masses expressed in placards that read, "We have a right to something besides work." "We have a right to bread." "Labor, which alone produces wealth, alone has the right to wealth." "No more profit."

German WW I officer, ca. 1920

"I asked the people about the Kaiser (Wilhelm II), the sum of all their answers was that the Kaiser today, even if not openly popular, nevertheless has a greater hold on the respect and affections of the Germans as a whole than has any other in the Empire. The crown prince is not popular. They say the Kaiser was badly advised, but that after all, no man in Germany has the interests of Germany so close at heart or worked so hard or tirelessly as did the Kaiser. Another idea which is also very widespread is that the great general staff which he reared so carefully became a car of Juggernaut and rolled over him. They all agree that he was weak about the use of gas. They say that he forbade the use of gas, but was later overruled by the militarists. No one thinks that the use of gas was wrong, though quite a number think it was very foolish to start off on a small scale. They argue that if the Kaiser had allowed the use of gas on a tremendous scale, as the general staff wanted to at the beginning, they would have won the war before the allies could have provided themselves with gas masks. It is also said that the kaiser opposed air raids on undefended towns in England, but was overruled by the general staff. I have heard a great many bitter criticisms of the German chemists who could not discover a nonflammable gas for Zeppelins, while American chemists did."

Mobile soup field kitchen in Germany ca. 1920

Koehler assessed the two needs of Germany in the few months following the Armistice: food and raw materials. Food to keep her poor people from suffering and actual starvation within weeks, since they had no money to purchase food at profiteer prices, and to keep her workmen out of bolshevism. Raw materials were needed partly for the same reason, to block bolshevism and to help Germany to regain her place in the commercial world and also to repay the enormous war debt saddled on her by the Kaiser and his military advisors. "The Germans are not starved yet, but they are pretty hungry. One sees a good many double chins and paunches still, that is among the men. The women look really emaciated. They have suffered from the food shortage a great deal more than the men. The saddest thing, however; is the suffering among children. They show it markedly. Infant mortality has been very high and still is, though not as bad as in the winter of 1916–17. Meat sells at from 29 to 30 marks a pound, including the bone. To illustrate the scarcity, during an attack of Spartacans in Wilhelmshaven, a horse in a passing cart was shot. Within 20 minutes after it fell, every shred of flesh had been stripped from its bones. This indicates that meat shortage even more plainly than the empty butcher shops do. Grocery shops appear fairly well stocked, but the prices are enormous. Practically everything is rationed, including clothing. Great quantities of potatoes and cabbages are on hand, and, counting the difference in exchange, they can be bought cheaper here than in England. practically no vegetables of any other kind are on hand. No tinned vegetables are obtainable in any of the shops. Fats do not exist. There is an almost total absence of soap. They have a substitute which is said to be very poor. The bread is bad. It is made of wurzel meal, as potatoes cannot be spared for meal. There is very little milk in the country."

Germany's solution to its economic woes would be a massive emigration to the United States that would both create a new market for Germany to revitalize its industrial capacity and facilitate remittances back to Germany as the new immigrants prospered, Koehler believed. Receiving Koehler's report, Admiral Sims replied, "My opinion of the value and the interest of this letter is such that... I have had it mimeographed for circulation among our forces here... I am also sending copies to the O.N.I. (Office of Naval Intelligence) and to certain officers....I should be glad if, as opportunity provides, you would continue similar observations and send them in to headquarters." Koehler's assessment of conditions in Germany were reprinted in American newspapers.

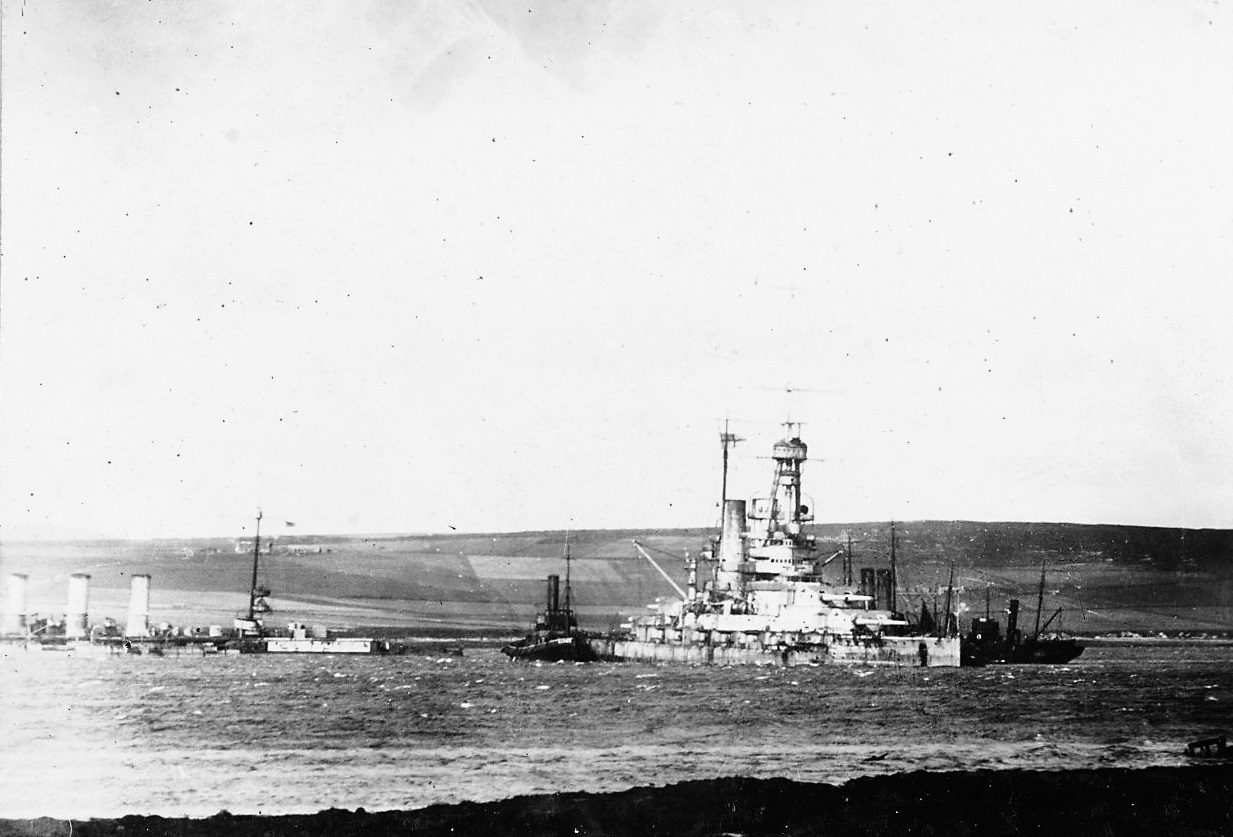
The light cruiser Frankfurt, left, and the battleship Baden, aground in Swanbister Bay, Scapa Flow, sometime soon after the majority of the interned German battle fleet was scuttled on June 21, 1919

Koehler made a follow-up inspection and report from Wilhelmshaven and Kiel on June 16, reporting that "The whole harbor of Kiel was filled with decaying men-of-war. It is almost impossible to conceive how complete is the ruin that comes to men-of-war in just a few months of neglect, for these splendid ships of only six months ago are even now almost beyond recall..." Less than a week after Koehler wrote his report, the German navy in defiance of the terms of the Peace "diktat", scuttled most of its ships interned at Scapa Flow. Reporting from Scapa Flow a week later, Koehler wrote, "All Germany and particularly naval officers are jubilant about the sinking of the German ships at Scapa Flow... Everywhere in Germany I heard the cry against the clause in the peace terms that provides for the trial of the Kaiser and others responsible for the war..." Koehler saw that over-reaching by the other allies, particularly France, would be problematic for the next generation. "In those questions on which the United States has taken a different stand than the Allies, Germans attribute it to a latent friendship for Germany- a friendship somewhat disturbed these last years but that still exists. It is difficult to point out that the attitude of the U.S. is not that of favoring Germany but simply the earnest desire to do the right thing and bring about a peace that does not contain in the very peace terms the germs of another war. That the U.S. took none of the surrendered U-boats is well known in Germany and considered a good omen that the U.S. has no desire to take anything from Germany. Extreme bitterness toward the English seems to be lost in their greater hatred of France. They say France has only one idea of peace- to ruin Germany utterly- and the only thing that can keep France from doing this is the British sense of fair play and this latent friendship from America....A restaurant manager asked the same question that greeted us on all sides: He was surprised when I mentioned it seemed likely the places to which Americans would flock after peace had been declared were the battlefields at Ypres, the Somme, and Château-Thierry, and not the spas of Germany...."

==== First American Officer in Berlin ====
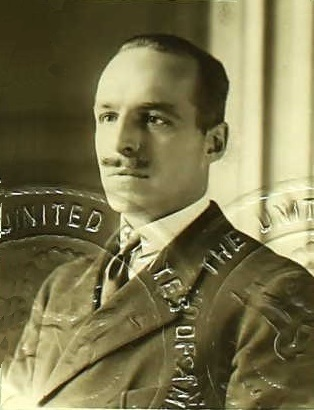
Hugo W. Koehler's 1919 US Passport photo

While newspapers reported that Hugo Koehler was the first American naval officer to enter Germany following the Armistice, Koehler did not enter Germany until February 1919. He does have the distinction of being the first American officer to enter Berlin following the signing of the Treaty of Versailles on June 28, 1919, officially ending the war. The Allied Naval Armistice Commission was at Hamburg embarked on the British cruiser, HMS Coventry. The city was under martial law and none of the British officers were interested in going ashore, unlike Koehler and Chief Yeoman Walter Dring, USN (1894–1984). Despite warnings of the danger, and armed with a notebook and pencils, Koehler and Dring sauntered down the gangplank and strode to the Hamburg-American Line pier. pushing through a crowd that was jostling for sugar and cigarettes, the pair were headed towards the main street, when two German military police on a sidecar motorcycle stopped and picked them up for questioning. Brought to German naval headquarters, they were interrogated by Admirals Scheer, Von Hipper and Von Reuter. Koehler explained that Coventry was the first inspection ship to arrive at Hamburg following the treaty and that the British officers preferred to remain on board. The Germans were greatly amused that the British were reluctant to come ashore and gave the American naval spy and his scribe permission to travel to Berlin by night train, provided they remained confined to their compartment. At 7 a.m. the following morning, Koehler and Dring arrived as the first American military to enter Berlin. They flipped a coin to see who would be first off the train, but "both landed on the platform at the same time in a heap". Koehler hailed a cab, an emaciated horse drawing a cart with bare, iron wheels, and directed the driver to the Adlon Hotel, where he reminisced with the owner, Lorenz Adlon (1849–1921) about meeting him in Berlin 25 years earlier with his grandfather, and gave the man two chocolate bars, soap and cigarettes. After breakfast, the duo's sightseeing was interrupted by three policemen who escorted them back to the hotel. With no papers other than their orders from London, they were directed to take the 6 o'clock train out of Berlin. But Koehler had other plans, and instead of going back to Hamburg and HMS Coventry, he took Dring to the best hotel in Düsseldorf. From there they boarded a train to Hanover, then on to Cologne, where Koehler sought out British officers of the Army of Occupation who promptly locked them up as spies. "Hugo looked like the Kaiser with that damn little mustache," complained Dring. When they were released, they took a train to Brussels and then on to Paris, where Koehler told Dring that he was "going to duck for three or four hours before reporting to the embassy." Left to face the Red Cross alone and standing in line for breakfast with other servicemen, Dring was questioned and declared that he had just come from Germany. Red Cross officials disbelieved his story and the MP's believed he was a spy, so Dring was again arrested and continued to go hungry.

=== Rear Admiral Newton McCully and North Russian Operations ===
R. Adm. Newton A. McCully, ca. 1921

When Dring finally got to the American embassy in Paris, officials asked where Koehler was. The roving commander showed up a few days later and wrote his follow-up report on conditions inside Germany. On July 7, the adventure was over and Dring was ordered back to London. Before he left, he introduced Koehler to Rear Admiral McCully, who had recently arrived from Allied operations in North Russia. In Paris, Koehler was assigned as aide to McCully, the senior Navy member of the American Commission to Negotiate Peace. As a lieutenant commander in 1904, McCully had been a military observer embedded with the Imperial Russian Army during the Russo-Japanese War, arriving at the front lines in Manchuria via the Trans-Siberian Railway. Returning to the United States in 1906, McCully had submitted a lengthy report on his findings. In 1914, McCully was assigned as naval attaché at St. Petersburg. By 1916, fluent in Russian and knowledgeable of the fluid political, military and social conditions there, he warned the State Department that food shortages, official corruption and a demoralized populus might soon force Russia out of World War One. In 1917 he witnessed the beginnings of the Russian Revolution. Shortly after this, he was ordered back to sea duty in the Atlantic and promoted to rear admiral in September 1918. Less than a month before the Armistice, McCully was designated as Commander, U.S. Naval Forces in Northern Russia, and read his orders aboard the USS Olympia on October 24, 1918. With Olympia's departure for Scotland on November 8, McCully and a small contingent of officers and bluejackets were the American naval presence for the Allied intervention in the Russian Civil War, the struggle between the Bolsheviks and those who opposed them (often known as the "Reds" and "Whites", respectively). The 8,000 American troops of the American Expeditionary Force Siberia sent by President Woodrow Wilson to Vladivostok to guard the billion-dollar investment of American guns and equipment along the Trans-Siberian railroad and protect the Czech legion tried to remain in a defensive posture. A larger force of British "Tommies", freezing alongside the Czechs, fought among themselves as much as against the Bolsheviki. The separate 5,000 troop Polar Bear Expedition was sent to Archangel to guard the Murman and Archangel-Vologda railways and Allied supply stockpiles in the vicinity. American military action was deemed admissible only to assist the Czechs in defending themselves against armed Austrian and German prisoners that were attacking them and to steady efforts at self-government by the Russians. American policy was stated on August 3, 1918, the day after the Allied occupation of Archangel, "Whether from Vladivostok or from Murmansk and Archangel, the only present object for which American troops will be employed will be to guard military stores which may subsequently be needed by Russian forces and to render such aid as may be acceptable to the Russians in the organization of their self-defense." No interference with Russian political sovereignty or intervention in her internal affairs was planned. Despite this directive, during their 19 months in Siberia, 189 soldiers of the American Expeditionary Force Siberia died from all causes, including combat. The smaller American North Russia Expeditionary Force experienced 235 deaths from all causes during their nine months embedded during fighting near Archangel. Through March 1919, McCully's men primarily operated ashore from Murmansk and engaged in intelligence gathering and reporting to Admiral Sims in London on the political, financial, military, naval, and economic conditions. McCully reported that the Whites and Allied forces controlled about two-thirds of Archangel province, south to Murmansk and west to the border between Finland and Karelia. Concerning naval conditions there was little to report, for there had been no naval operations, the Bolsheviks not having a deep-water naval presence in North Russia. With his familiarity of Russia and its language, unquestionably, McCully was the Navy's top "Russia man". In a report to Admiral Sims in late February, McCully reported that the military situation in the Archangel region was precarious and that Allied forces along both the Archangel-Vologda railway and the Murman railway were insufficient. He urged stationing vessels at both Archangel and Murmansk and providing another to cruise along the 1,600-mile coast and visit other ports. During May through June, the patrol gunboat USS Sacramento (PG-19), protected cruiser USS Des Moines (CL-17) and three Eagle-class patrol boats were detached to McCully, to supplement the Spanish American War-era, steam-schooner USS Yankton that he had taken as his flagship in February. By order of the Secretary of the Navy dated June 30, two days after the signing of the peace treaty at Versailles, McCully was detached from his command in Northern Russia and directed to proceed to London. Following the withdrawal of U.S. ground forces from Archangel and its vicinity in July, with a backdrop of deteriorating morale and American public opinion, the last remaining U.S. naval vessel, Des Moines stood out from Archangel on September 14, 1919, and steamed down the Northern Dvina River for Harwich, England, marking the conclusion of American naval operations in North Russia.

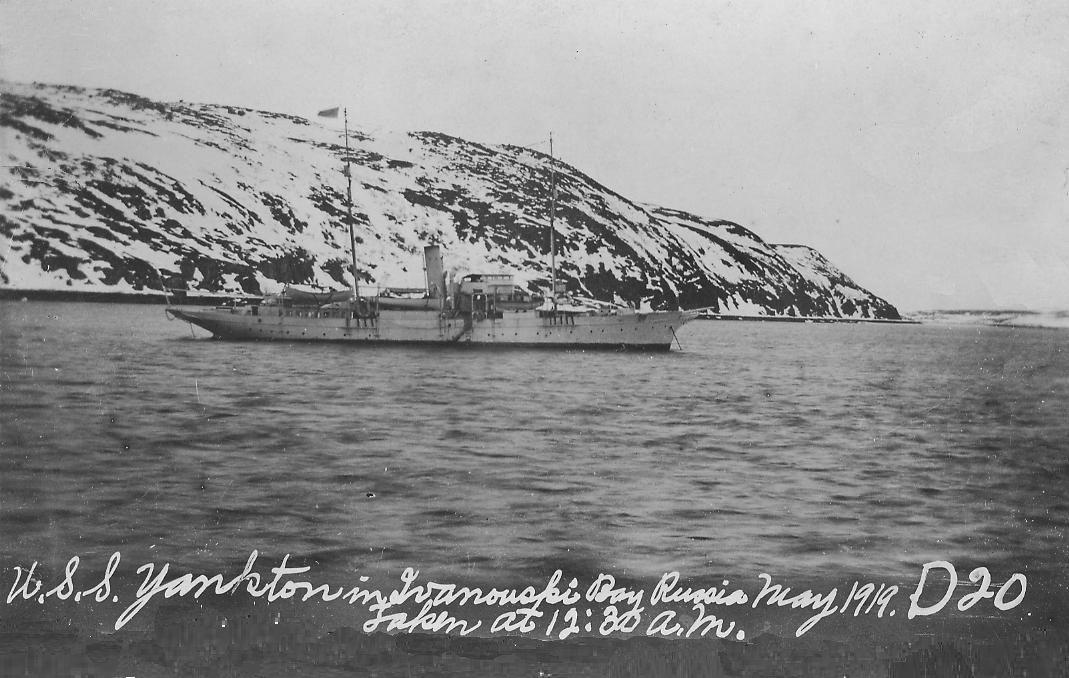
USS Yankton at Ivanovski Bay, Russia, 1230 a.m., May 1919

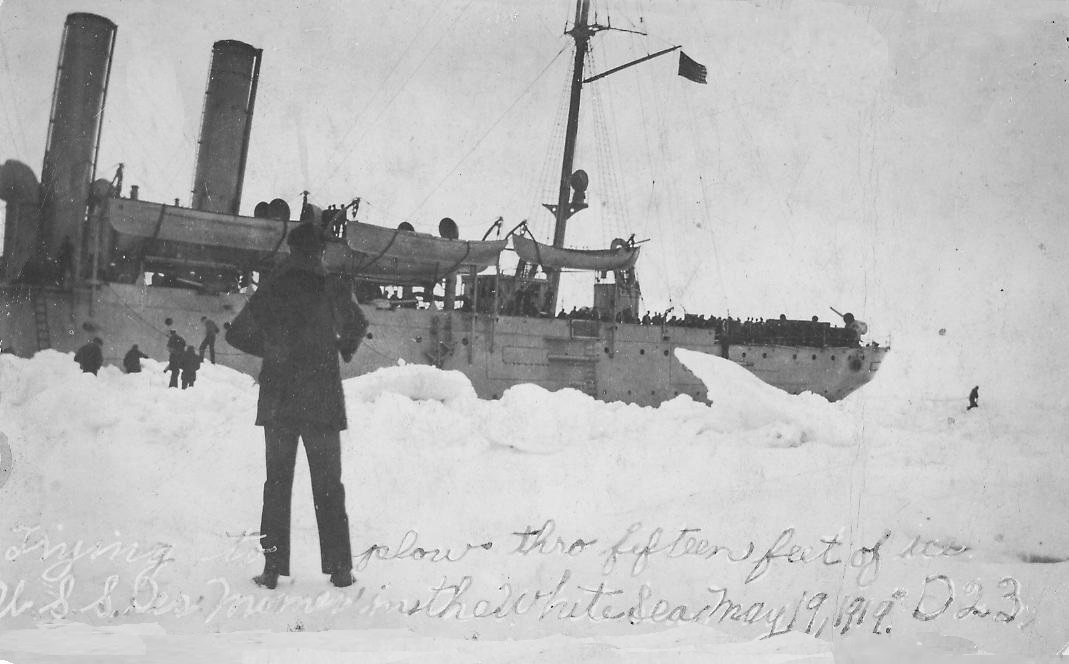
USS Des Moines in 15 feet of snow and ice, White Sea, Russia, May 19, 1919

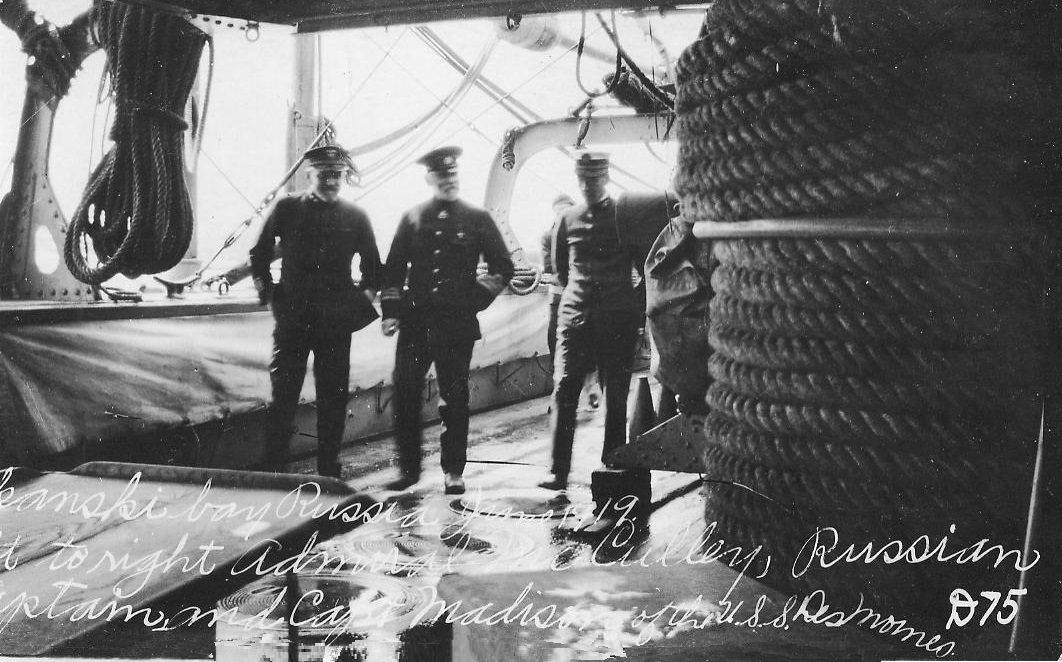
L to R, Rear Admiral Newton McCully, unknown Russian naval captain, Captain Zachariah Madison, commanding, aboard USS Des Moines, Russia, June 1919

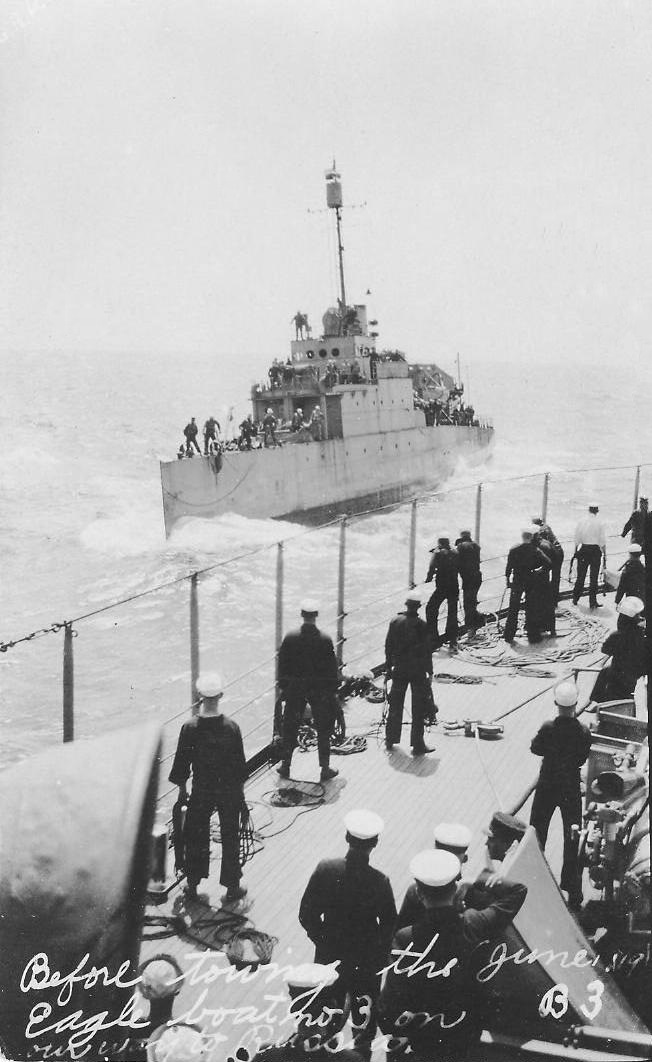
Preparing to tow USS Eagle Boat 3 (PE-3), June 1919

USS Sacramento at Archangel, Russia, 1919

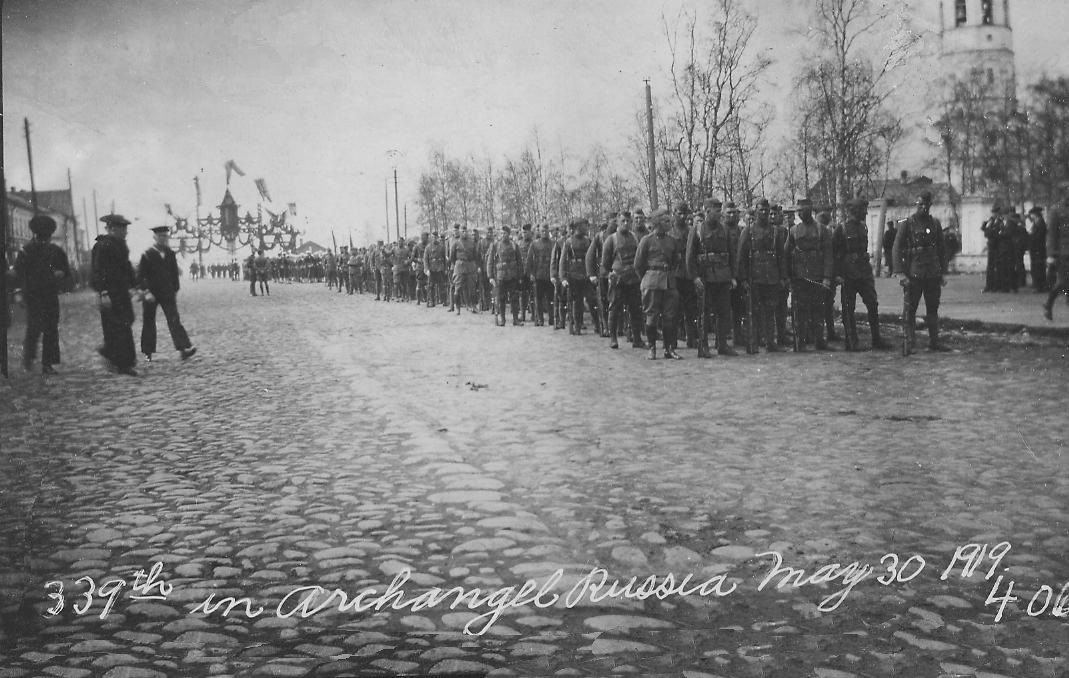
339th US Army Infantry Regiment, at Archangel, May 30, 1919

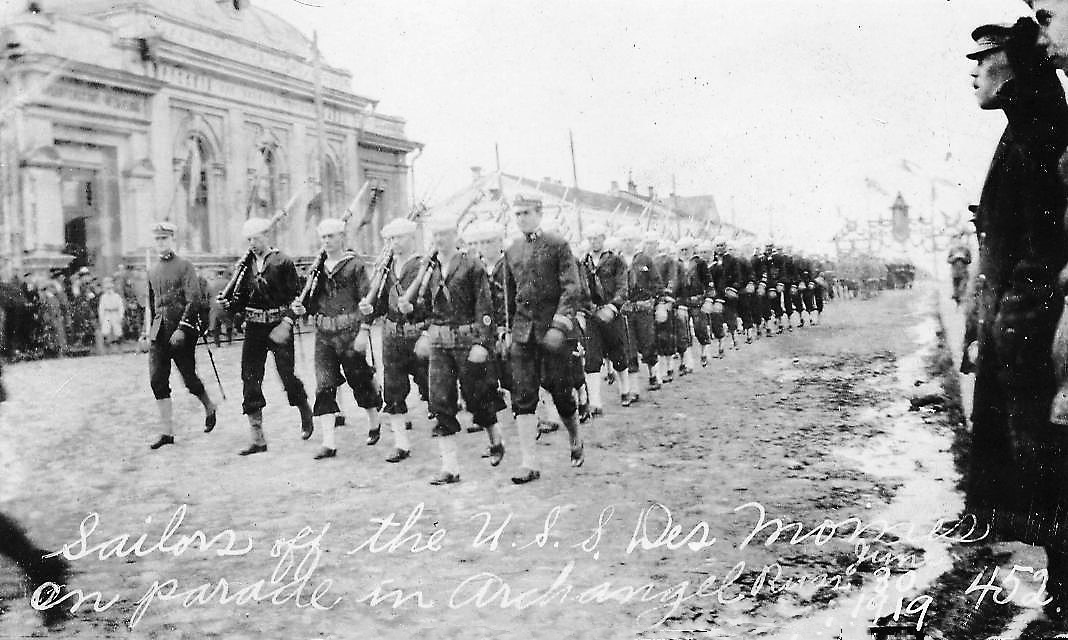
USS Des Moines sailors on parade at Archangel, June 1919

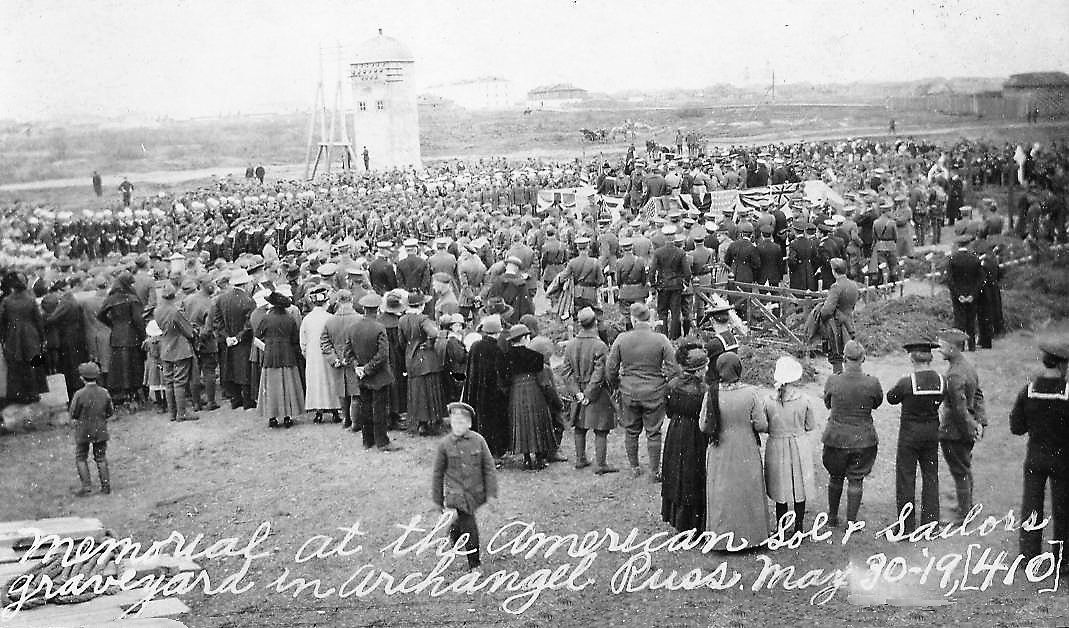
Memorial at US Army and Navy cemetery at Archangel, Russia, May 30, 1919

=== With McCully's "Mission to South Russia" ===
Hugo Koehler in 1920 under orders to the U.S. State Dept. Mission to South Russia

On August 6, Koehler was sent on another fact-finding survey in Germany, where he inspected floating dry docks. Before returning to Paris, he was ordered to London to brief Winston Churchill at the War Office on conditions inside Germany. With the exception of Churchill, the allies had been reluctant to enter the Russian morass. Foreign intervention in the Russian Civil War would not have proceeded without Churchill's persistence. As he warned the House of Commons in March 1919, "Bolsheviks destroy wherever they exist but by rolling forward into fertile areas, like the vampire which sucks the blood from its victim, they gain means of prolonging their own baleful existence." In the spring of 1919, the army of Admiral Alexander Kolchak, organizer of the "White" resistance in Siberia had advanced to the Volga River. The forces of Russian general Yevgeny Miller were fighting the "Reds" as far as Petrograd. From the west, a small army under General Nikolai Yudenich had also advanced on Petrograd, while in South Russia, the forces of General Anton Denikin had begun to advance on Moscow. But by the summer, the advances of all the various White factions, and their fortunes, reversed almost simultaneously, except for those in South Russia that continued to advance into autumn. Seizing the opportunity to fill the void of the departed German army, newly independent Poland occupied parts of Lithuania, eastern Galicia and Ruthenia, before advancing into western Ukraine, where Nestor Makhno, an anarchist with a band of militarist peasants was attacking both Red and White troops. With the governments of Britain and America yielding to public pressure at home and withdrawing their troops from Archangel, Murmansk and Olonets, Miller's troops were left to face the Reds alone, and swift defeat. Yudenitch overreached his advance and the Reds repulsed his forces back to the Baltic states, where they disbanded. To the east, Kolchak's over-extended troops were trounced before they could reach the Volga and began a torturous retreat to Siberia, without supplies and forced to strip corpses for clothes and shoes.

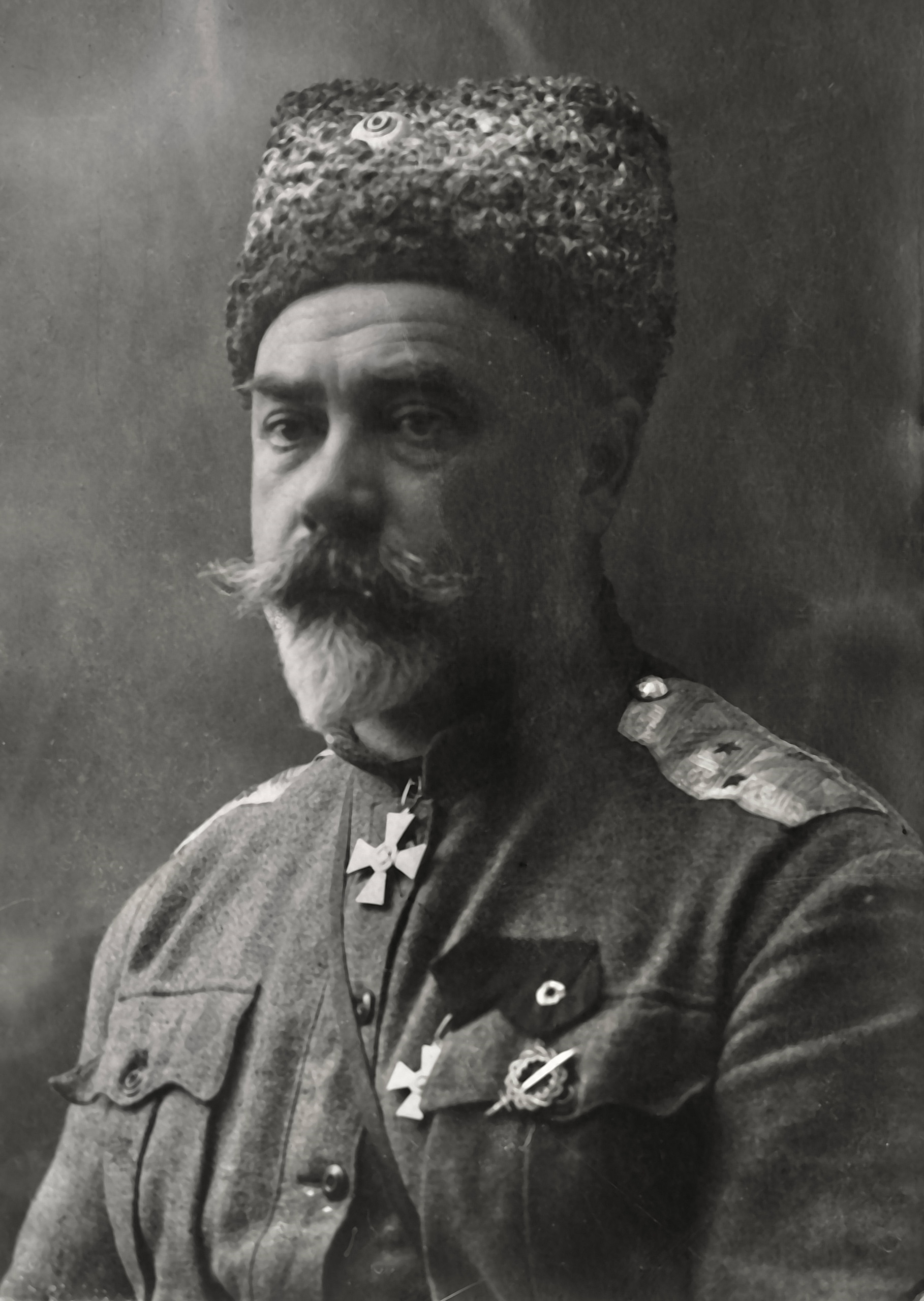
General Anton Denikin

Denikin reached within 200 miles of Moscow, and filled with hubris, debated which horse he would triumphantly ride into the city, but over-extended and with broken supply lines, in October, the Reds pummelled his forces at Oryol and forced him to retreat with his disintegrating army.

Occupation of Kharkov by Denikin's White Army, ca. 1918

Red Army infantry marching to Kharkov, 1919

Driven southward, his troops surrendered Kharkov to the Bolsheviks on December 13, 1919. By the end of that year, the struggle between the Bolsheviks and the Whites had driven thousands of retreating White Army troops and civilian refugees to the northern shore of the Black Sea and into the Crimean Peninsula, where they could expect no mercy from the Bolsheviks. The Peace Commission concluded on December 10, and while the other American staff members returned to the United States, McCully was ordered to London as a representative on the Commission on Naval Terms. At the suggestion of Admiral Mark L. Bristol, Commander, Naval Forces, Turkish Peninsula, McCully was proposed to lead a special mission for the U.S. State Department with the purpose of keeping the government informed of developments in that region and to protect American lives and interests.

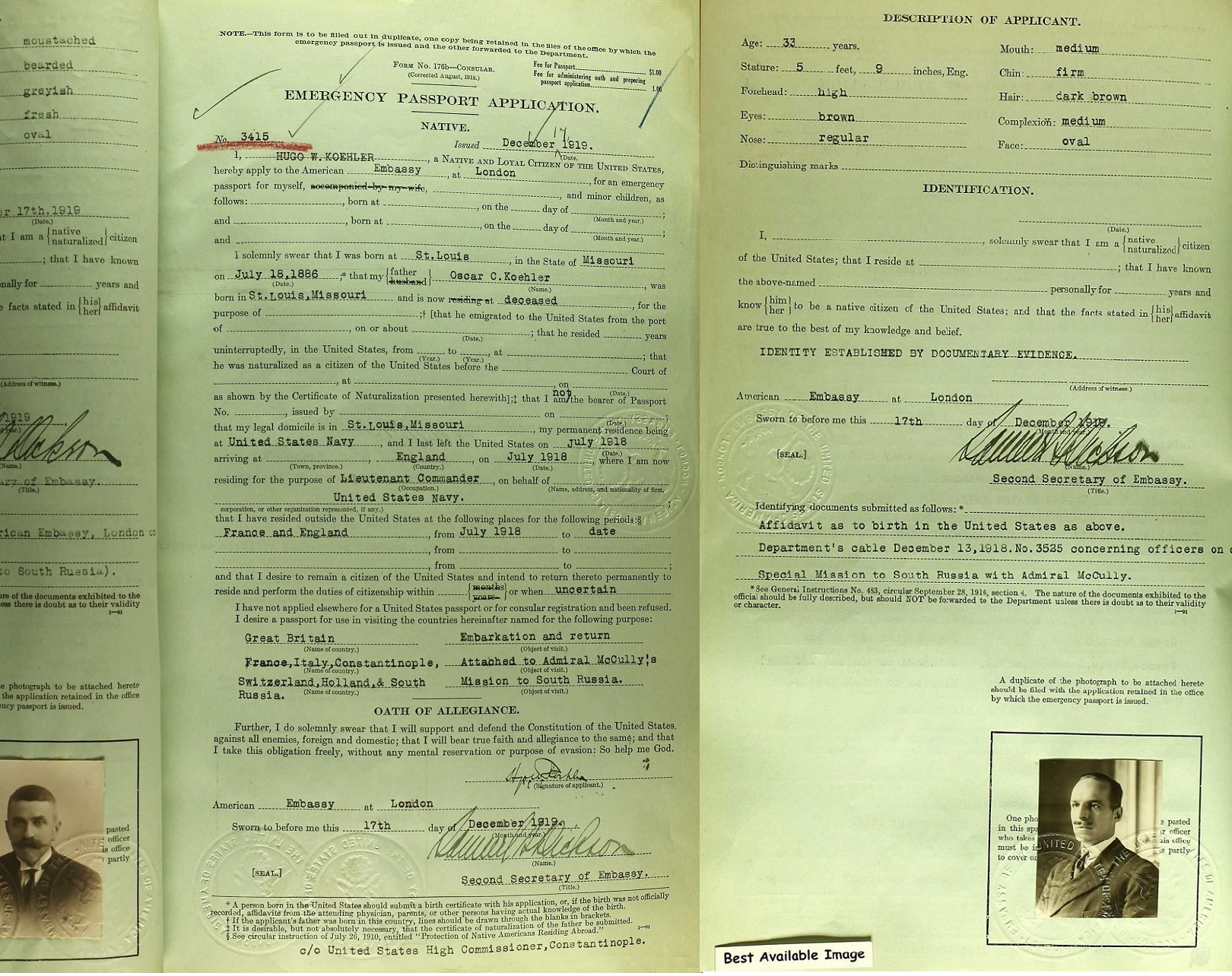
Lt. Cdr. Hugo W. Koehler's Emergency Passport Application for State Dept. Mission to Russia, December 17, 1919. Rear Admiral Newton McCully's application and photo are to the left

On December 23, 1919, Secretary of State Robert Lansing cabled McCully designating him Special Agent for the Department of State and instructing him to proceed with a detachment including Koehler, who was then also fluent in Russian as his second-in-command, and nine other naval officers and enlisted men, "to the south of Russia with a view, first, to make observations and report to this Department upon political and economic conditions in the region visited, and second, to establish informal connection with General Denikin and his associates." ("South of Russia" meaning the area roughly encompassed by Ukraine and Crimea.) Taking a train from Paris to Italy, on New Year's Day 1920, Koehler and McCully sailed aboard the steamer Karlsbad bound for Salonika, Greece. Six days later they arrived at Constantinople. En route through Greece, Koehler characteristically took the opportunity to engage the locals and analyze the economic and social conditions. In a letter to his mother, he showed remarkable astuteness in commenting on the economic imbalance of the Greek economy that led to its debt crisis nearly a century later. "I talked to .... a professor at the University of Athens, [who] spoke at great length about Greek claims to Smyrna. I asked what these claims were and what they were based on. They were all based on historical reasons, he answered but was vague as to the exact historical reasons.... I commented that... what Greece needed was raisins rather than historical reasons-- raisins and olive oil to pay for her tremendous imports being paid for only by loans and paper... But apparently the Greeks believe that there is no need for such mundane things as raisins and olives while loans are plentiful and they can get flour and automobiles for paper money...."

==== Odessa, February 1920 ====
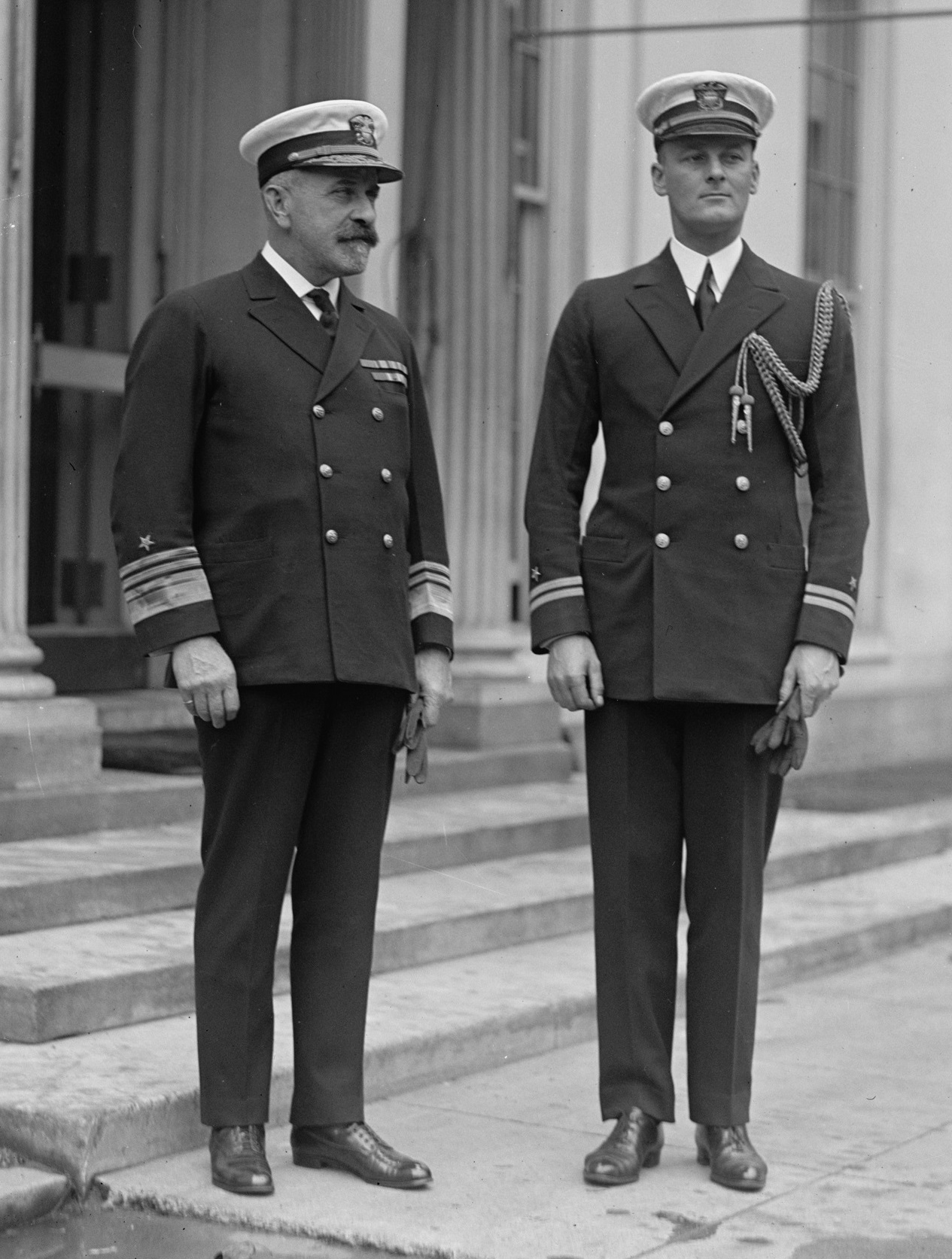
Vice Admiral Newton McCully and Lt. Hamilton Bryan

Vice Admiral Bristol detached one of the various destroyers in his command, to operate along the northern Black Sea coast to assist the Mission, enabling McCully to continuously maintain mail and radio communication. Bristol dispatched Lt. Hamilton V. Bryan to serve as McCully's agent at Odessa in Ukraine, and he also kept Bristol informed of happenings. On the morning of February 10, 1920, Koehler came ashore at Odessa lighthouse from the destroyer USS Talbot (DD-114) on a mission to evacuate the few American citizens believed still in the city, which had been overrun by the Bolshevik Red Army in the Odessa Operation after General Nikolai Shilling, Denikin's appointed commander of White forces in the Odessa area, had failed to mount any defense and been among the first to evacuate. Russian and British mission officers, along with 5,000 refugees were being evacuated by sea under the protection of the British cruiser HMS Ceres. Negotiating his way up from the lighthouse keeper, who was loath to go into the city, to the captain of the Red Guard, Koehler quickly arranged to be taken to meet with General Ieronim Uborevich of the Red Army, the victor of Odessa that had vanquished Denikin's Whites from the town. Repeatedly questioned by a commisar what Entente men-of-war were doing in the harbor and why they had fired on Bolshevik troops, Koehler steadfastly and calmly parried the charges, insisting that no firing had occurred since Talbot anchored in the harbor, that the Americans were there for the sole purpose of evacuating refugees, and that he understood the reason for prior naval gun fire was because Odessa had been occupied by "marauders and thieves" before the Red Army entered. When Uborevich questioned Koehler about American opinion of Bolshevism and its recent victories, Koehler responded that he "had not been in America since the war, so he "did not know American opinion in detail, but that in general, I thought that American opinion was not impressed with the chance of success of any government based on the will of so minute a minority as that of the present Bolshevist regime." Koehler was initially told by Uborevich and a commisar that they would need "word from Moscow" on his request to make contact with the Americans, that might take two or three days. Koehler was able to expertly manipulate around the delay and avoid becoming an extended "guest" of the Reds. When Uborevich asked Koehler what he thought of the recent Red victories, Koehler told him that his impression was that the Red advance was more an example of the weakness of Denikin's forces than the strength of the Red Army. "No one made any comment on this reply and I became very definitely of the opinion that at heart they agreed with me."

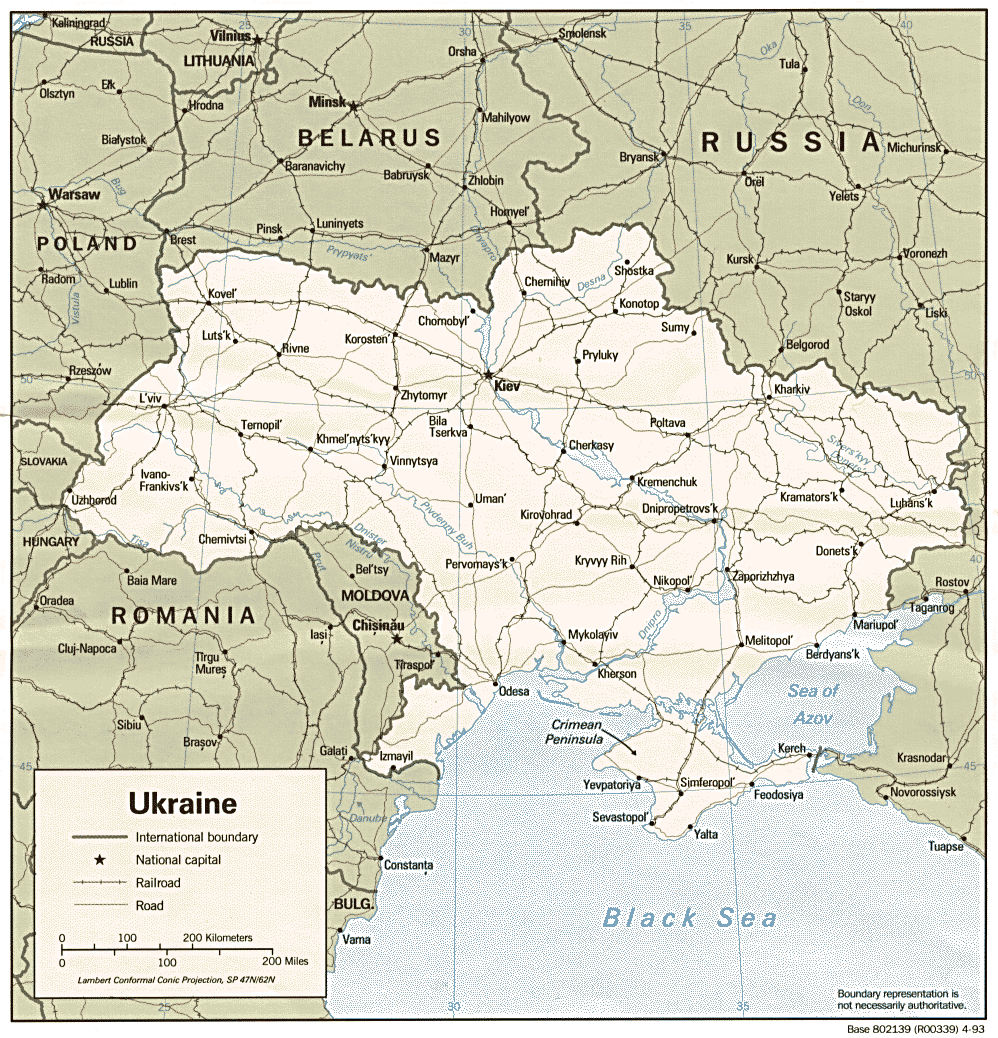
Map of South Russia (Ukraine and Crimean peninsula)

Accompanied by a general, orderly and a guard, Koehler first went to the address of Mrs. Annette Keyser (1893–1971), a Russian-born composer, singer and widow of an American citizen. As the grateful woman wrote a few years later to Secretary of the Navy, Edward Denby, "I happened to be sick in bed with pneumonia and tonsillitis, and I wrote a letter to the American mission, imploring them to save me... I could not believe my eyes when I beheld a tall man entering my room dressed in a black cloak, conveyed by two armed Bolshevists. Is it possible? An AMERICAN OFFICER, I exclaimed.... Lt. Cmdr. Hugo W. Koehler-- came close, he said, 'Yes, it is possible; here I am to help you, as I know you are sick." I broke down, crying like a child, and begged the kind officer to take me to America, to my Mother, as I had no one in Odessa but my beloved husband's grave... During the sad scene one of the armed Bolshevists took stations at the door, and the other, evidently knowing the English language, came closer to hear the conversation. Lieutenant Commander Koehler tried to quiet me, explaining that he had orders to take the refugees to Constantinople only. The neighbors hearing this, advised me to remain, as I was too ill to travel. Lieutenant Commander Koehler, also finding this best, advised me to stay.... Thinking that I was in need, he offered me money... and he assured me that I was not in danger, and if he found out that I was, he would come and take me with him. After he left, my friend explained to me that his (Koehler's) life was in danger, as there was no government to be responsible if anything should happen to him.... [I] prayed to be in a position to come to the United States some day in order to find Lieutenant Commander Koehler and to thank him personally and to tell the world that there are still some noble and kind people who will endanger their lives to help a little, weak woman, a mere stranger." The Secretary of the Navy wrote to Koehler that his "chivalrous efforts" were "the kind of service that makes life worthwhile."

From her studio in Los Angeles, California, Annette Keyser recalled a dozen years later, "I was ill with pneumonia at Odessa.... My condition was too serious to permit my removal and Commander Koehler came ashore and with the aid of Capt. [James] Irvine got a promise from the revolutionists that upon my recovery I would be permitted to leave. This I did and was put on board a Turkish steamer and reached Constantinople safely." After Koehler had made arrangements with the Reds to secure Keyser's safety and eventual evacuation to Constantinople, with his Red escort he next visited the addresses of three American men, and determined that two had already made it safely out of Odessa; however, the third was believed to be in the city and "strongly suspected of pro-Bolshevik leanings". Koehler was then taken back to Red headquarters, where he was able to delay his voluntary departure for a day, and make further observations as he walked ten miles through the besieged city. "I entered two food shops and although there was not a great abundance of supplies, both shops had customers buying food. All money is current: Soviet, Romanov, Kerensky, even Denikin army money, in accordance with the decree to the effect that shopkeepers are required to accept every kind of Russian money tendered to them.... Streets of the town were in deplorable condition. Numerous dead horses and dogs were lying about, but I saw no human bodies,... the Americans I was endeavoring to locate lived in widely separated quarters of the town, so I was able to go practically everywhere I wished... I was particularly on the lookout for signs of German influence, German officers or munitions, any trace of German activity, but failed to discover anything...." About a week after Koehler's departure from Odessa, the Bolshevik government sent a long wireless dispatch to President Wilson and the League of Nations, complaining that after "Captain Keller" had left the city and "given [his] word" that he would not fire on the town, "a murderous fire was opened up from [his] entire squadron and hundreds of innocent women and children were killed thereby." As Koehler wrote to his mother about the deceitful fabrication, "And incidentally, although this message described me as a very terrible and very wicked man, I've always been grateful to the Bolsheviks for it, for in light of these tactics I was able to understand many things not clear to me before."

==== Novorossiysk, March 1920 ====
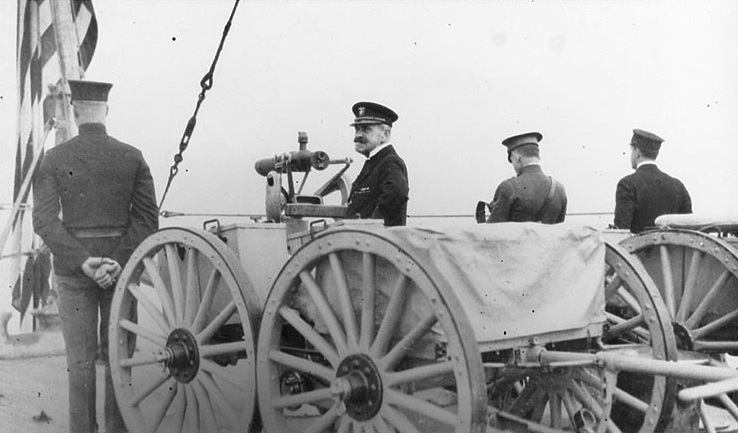
Rear Admiral Newton McCully aboard USS Galveston at Novorossiysk, March 1920

After the fall of Odessa to the Reds, Koehler and McCully returned to Sebastopol and a short visit to the battle front. Returning to Novorossiysk on February 20 aboard the cruiser USS Galveston (CL-19), they found the city flooded with refugees from Kharkov and Rostov. Denikin blamed his subordinates for his military failures, particularly General Pyotr Wrangel, who had advocated a concentration of White forces in the Crimea to make a last stand there in December, a plan that Denikin had rejected. Now in March, it was a disastrous, headlong retreat into the port of Novorossiysk that Denikin had made no provisions for. Instead, while many in the White army and navy had called on Denikin to replace the incompetent Shilling with Wrangel, Denikin had banished Wrangel, a respected and highly competent soldier, to Constantinople. The end of Denikin's army came amidst a brutal winter, and a Typhoid fever epidemic. On March 16, Ekaterinodar, capital of the Kuban province about 80 miles northeast of Novorossiysk was captured by the Reds. On March 26, Red forces reached the vicinity of Novorossiysk, advancing along the railway as the British battleship HMS Emperor of India, the cruiser HMS Calypso and the French cruiser Waldeck-Rousseau fired their naval guns into the hills to support the withdrawal of Denikin's forces. Around noon, fires broke out by the railway yards and waterfront, which soon became uncontrolled infernos, consuming buildings, warehouses, ammunition, oil and rolling stock worth hundreds of thousands of dollars. Tons of weapons, tanks, armored cars and munitions were pushed off the docks into the harbor. As Koehler described it, "Ships lying alongside the docks crowded on human cargo almost to the last inch of space and then, fearing the fire, moved away from the piers into the stream, although they made almost no impression on the multitude seeking to board. packed on the docks and beach, surrounded by raging fire, were thousands who had hoped and expected to be taken away, but who had been left behind for lack of ships to embark them. These were mostly soldiers just arrived from the vanished front, but many women and children were seen among them." Rear Admiral McCully, a humanitarian and a naval officer, recommended to the State Department, that the Russian refugees from the Caucus and Kuban be granted asylum, but was turned down. Although Admiral Bristol was also a humanitarian, and ultimately played a major role in the resettlement of displaced persons from the region, he did not then want to be saddled with thousands of refugees and ordered McCully to bring no more than 250 down the Bosporus Strait in his ships. About 200 women and children were transported on Galveston and the destroyer, USS Smith Thompson (DD-212) to Proti Island in the Sea of Marmara, with another thousand transported on American ships to the Crimea. On the morning of March 27, Galveston stood out from Novorossiysk, with 3-inch shells from Red shore batteries falling perilously close, as the beleaguered city fell to the Reds. Koehler wrote, "Several small boat trips were made from the Galveston in a last effort to rescue a few more women and children, but it was impossible to get any considerable number of them through the throng." Besides troops and refugees pouring into the Crimea, another 50,000 refugees were transported to the Bosporus on Russian ships. Koehler described the plight of those who could not flee, but instead sought to negotiate with the Bolsheviks for surrender, "The Reds promised immunity to all except malefactors, on the condition the troops would march against the Poles; but immediately on the surrender being accomplished, the Reds began the usual slaughter of officers and stripped the soldiers of their clothes. The Cossacks again took to arms, about 10,000 taking to the hills and about 2,000 escaping across the Georgian border. Unable to take them along, about 700 children were drowned at the beach by their mothers, who then took to the hills with the men."

American Red Cross Officer, Lt. L.M. Foster with mobile, surplus army field kitchen at Novorossiysk Russia, three days before the City fell to the Reds, March 1920

Russian refugees on Red Cross Relief Ship, Sangamon, Novorossiysk, March 1920

Refugee children that were separated from their parents during the Novorossiysk exodus with Lt. L.M. Foster, aboard the relief ship, Sangamon, March 1920

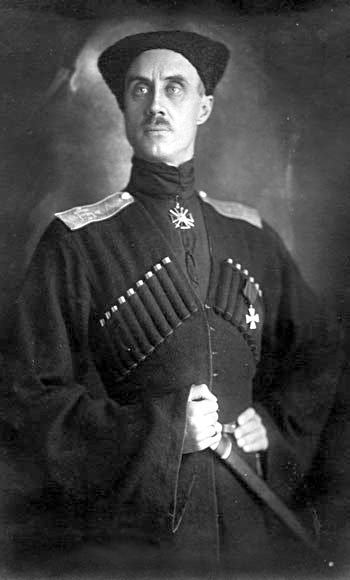
General (Baron) Pyotr Wrangel "The Black Baron"

The debacle at Novorossiysk completely discredited Denikin, who fled the Crimea on March 21 and sailed to England. One of his last acts was to begrudgingly appoint General (Baron) Pyotr Wrangel as commander in chief of the White resistance. On April 4, Denikin issued a proclamation to the Don, Terek and Kuban cossack representatives dissolving the democratic government that had been formed on February 4, but making no provision for representative institutions. Wrangel, known as the "Black Baron" by the Reds, immediately locked down the Crimea as the last enclave of the White movement, ruthlessly restoring discipline by executing all looters, agitators, speculators and commissars, in one instance parading 370 men in front of him and then having them all shot. The remaining men were offered the alternative of joining the White Army. On April 10, Wrangel sailed with an expedition to Perekop in the Sea of Azov and after six days of heavy fighting had made a slight advance to secure a path for egress of the Crimean forces to the north, a tactical and symbolic advance that revived morale among the White troops and the confidence of the people that supported the resistance. With the reorganization of the White forces, on June 1, 1920, the "Black Baron" had an operational army of 40,000, consisting of First Corps under General Alexander Kutepov at Perekop with 7,000 Volunteer Army infantry, 46 guns, 12 tanks, 21 aeroplanes and 500 cavalry; Second Corps under General Yakov Slashchov, organized for a combined naval and military expedition to a port on the Sea of Azov, with 10,000 men in all, 58 guns, 3 aeroplanes, 5 armored motorcars and 400 cavalry; Third Corps under General A. Pisarev at the Sivash Isthmus with 11,000 men total, 19 guns, 9 aeroplanes, 3 armored trains, and 1,960 cavalry; and Fourth Corps, composed of dismounted Kuban cossacks, 14 guns, and about 16,000 men in reserve near Sivash. Wrangel also improved the naval assets of the White forces, with a Black Sea and separate Azov Sea flotilla. Receiving coal shipments from Constantinople in April and May to enable the ships to steam, the Black Sea ships numbered a battleship, three cruisers, ten destroyers and eight gunboats, and in the Azov Sea the Whites had fifteen shallow-draft boats.

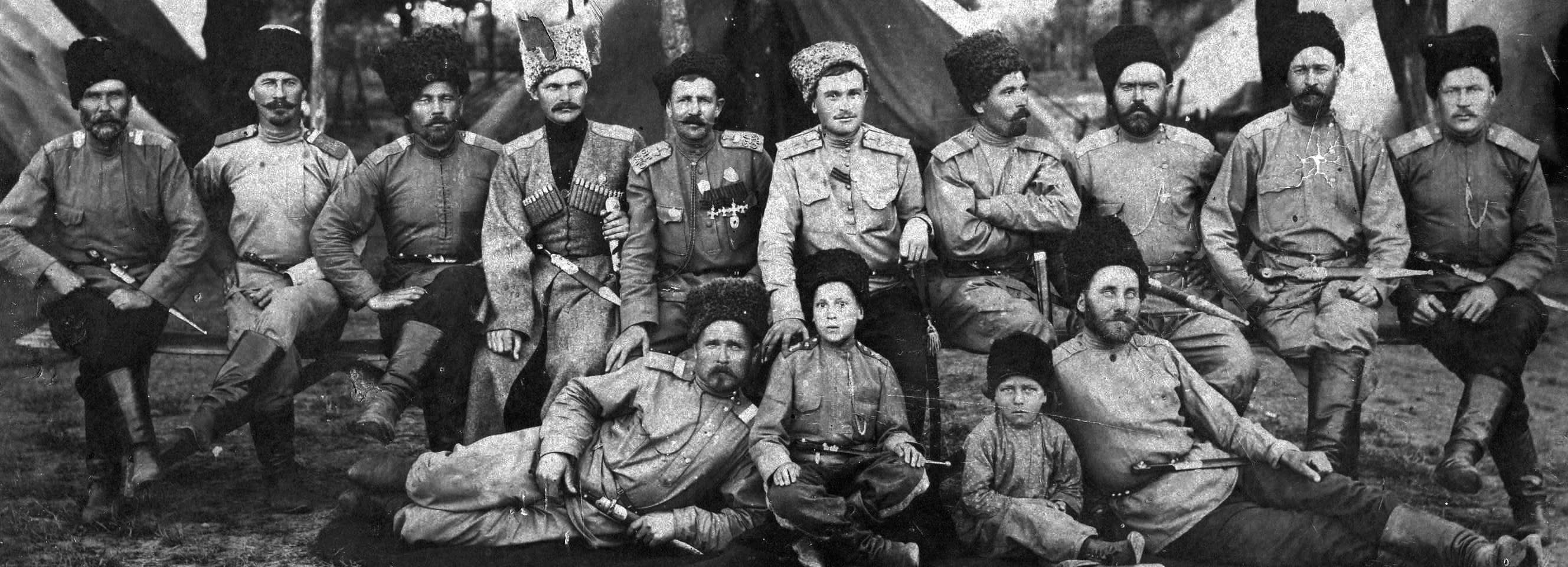
Kuban Cossacks during the Russian Civil War

Baron Pyotr Wrangel and White Army soldiers

Morale was also greatly improved, and while for the first time since the spring of 1918, the Cossacks did not figure as the prominent element of the White army, with a corresponding decrease in cavalry superiority, the army was now made up of men who were determined to fight the enemy. As Koehler wrote in his report, "The Cossacks are fighting to get back to their stanitzi in the Don and the Kuban- nor do they see much beyond that. They do not loot now, but resent being deprived of (as they look at it) a well-earned privilege... Russia means nothing to them... They... fight any... power or regime or idea that interferes with their old privileges."

==== Melitopol, June 1920 ====
Baroness Olga Wrangel with her three children at Constantinople in 1920

On April 3, Koehler and McCully reached the Crimean port of Yalta, where Koehler met Baron Wrangel hours after the general had returned from Constantinople to take charge of the remaining men of the White Army, and then headed to Sebastopol. While her husband commanded the White forces in South Russia, Baroness Wrangel remained in Constantinople with her three children, where she helped the American Red Cross care for the thousands of Russian refugees who were driven from their homes by the collapse of the Denikin forces. Baroness Wrangel was a daily worker on the island of Proti where the Red Cross cared for a colony of more than a thousand of these homeless and destitute people. In early June, McCully and Koehler stood out on the destroyer Smith Thompson from Sebastopol for the Sea of Azov based on information that the White army was making a landing there. Entering the Kerch Strait on June 6, the ship hugged the port shoreline to avoid the Red shore batteries on the starboard side. They were taken under fire, and the first shot came close as the destroyer sped up to 25 knots and hugged the west side of the straight, making it through to reach the Sivash front and General Slashchov's troop landing at the small village of Kirilovkar. McCully and Koehler went ashore, with McCully returning to the ship later that day with ten wounded Russian soldiers that were transported that night by the destroyer through the Kerch Strait to Sebastopol. Koehler stayed ashore, and the next day he caught up with Slashchov at Radionovka, interviewing Bolshevik prisoners and villagers on the way. "Villagers were bitter enough in denunciations of Bolsheviks, but I noted no great enthusiasm for Wrangel's forces- the attitude was one of indifference- of a people who had known the worst and cared little one way or another..."

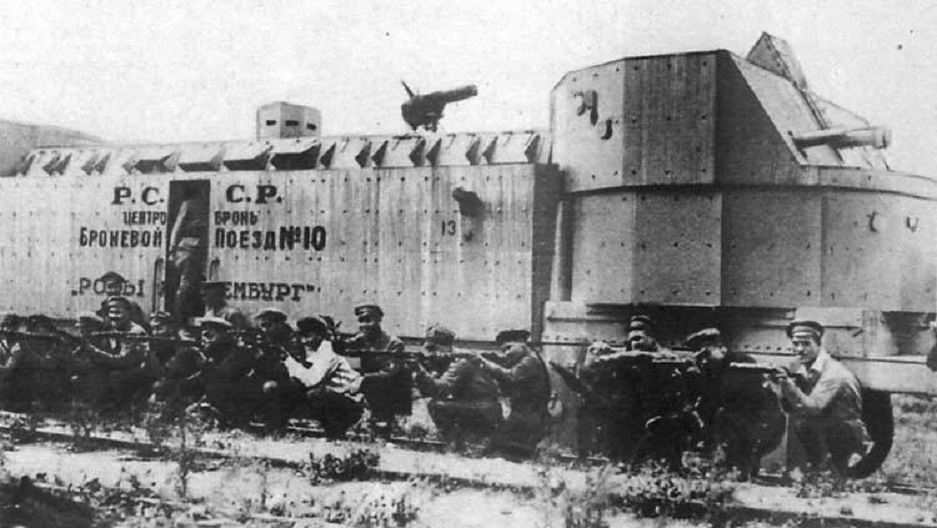
Red armored train and raiding party, ca. 1920

On daybreak of the third day, Koehler joined a small cavalry detachment headed toward the fighting in Melitopol. "Upon arrival at the outskirts of Melitopol we found Reds still held Melitopol station and were bombarding the town from armored trains at a distance, but the south Russian forces had occupied the main part of town. I continued on into the town and went at once to headquarters where I found General Tsichetski installed in the building hurriedly vacated a few hours previously by the Bolshevik Central Committee." At his request, Koehler was given three cossacks to accompany him to the address he had earlier obtained from a prisoner for the headquarters of the Bolshevik Tchresvichaika. Breaking the locks, the group began collecting up the papers that seemed of value, until seeing a group of White cavalry galloping by, they learned they were caught in the middle of Red troops that had counter-attacked and reentered the city. Rather than try to flee, Koehler and his party commandeered a cart and hid with their load of papers by a flour mill for a few hours, until the Red troops themselves retreated with White cavalry on their flank. Koehler and his group rode on to Radionovka "with their loot". Within a few days, Slashchov had conquered the entire province and doubled Wrangel's White-held territory, secured enough grain to feed the Crimea and his cavalry's horses, and improved the standing of the White cause in Europe. When Pisarev attacked at Chongar and Kutepov's Volunteer Army troops engaged the main Red forces at Perekop, the Reds were caught off guard and had to retreat to avoid being surrounded.

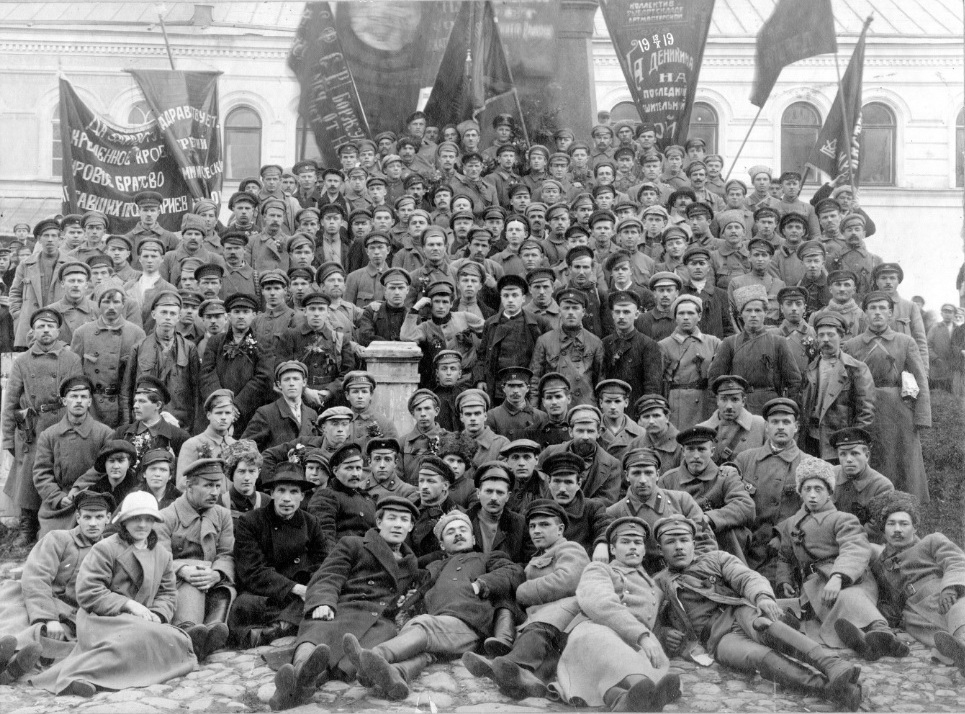
Red Army volunteers before being sent to the Civil War, ca. 1919

The day Koehler headed back to Crimea, Leon Trotsky arrived in Alexandrovsk and announced that the Tauride with its great stores of grain, had to be retaken, since a winter of starvation for the Reds had to be avoided at all costs. Koehler observed the White army equally needed the Tauride and its grain, "For the south too, will go hungry without this grain, and the army would be the first to starve... An army that has known cold and hunger as has this army, will fight hard before it leaves plenty to go back to cold and hungry." For Koehler's exploit in Melitopol, Rear Admiral McCully recommended him for award of the Distinguished Service Medal in July 1923 with the following citation, "During the capture of Melitopol by the Wrangel forces on June 10, 1920, he was in the advance guard [that] entered the town, immediately proceeding to the Bolshevik headquarters and began collection of their papers. While engaged in this work the town was recaptured by the Bolshevik troops and Lt. Cmdr. Koehler for several hours was cut off from the troops which he accompanied. He managed to conceal himself and in addition saved the papers which he had secured and which were of much value." The Bureau of Navigation declined to make the award, presumably not prepared to officially recognize an American naval officer in Bolshevik Russia, much less, in combat. Each of Wrangel's corps had a chief of civil administration to organize the newly occupied territory. In his report, Koehler recounted his interviews with the administrator in Melitopol, "He said his guiding idea was that this is a civil war, a struggle between Russians-- Russians of widely different ideas, to be sure-- but Russians; in short, the occupied area is not to be treated as conquered territory but must be administered so people will understand that the new regime is working for them and with them, not against them... [he] stated the first plan had been to give the land to the peasants without payment of any kind, but peasants would not believe that land received for nothing was actually theirs; ...[unless] they could pay actual money for the land, receive a receipt for such payment, and take home a paper with a large red seal that said the land was theirs..."

Russian Volunteer Army troops guarding American Red Cross medical supplies, June 1920

In a letter to Dolly Gladstone, Koehler chided her for Britain's investment in Denikin, having lately turned its sympathy from the cause of the White Russians under Denikin's successor, Wrangel, to the Bolshevists, "I'm afraid your experiment in backing Denikin has been much more costly for you and for Russia and for the world than the simple L400,000,000 (in stores, etc.,) you ventured on the project... Poor old Denikin- simple, honest, and a patriot, but undoubtedly one of the stupidest men who ever came into power in any country. Surrounded by incompetents and dishonesty, badly advised by his allies, he distinguished himself by not one single sound or wise measure. If he had thrown dice for every decision he would have improved just fifty percent. General Wrangel is of a different caliber: fine soldier, good general, honest, capable, full of courage and initiative, no great statesman, but he knows it and surrounds himself with men who can take care of that end of the game... His miracles continue. But he cannot beat bolshevism by force of arms- nor can any army. Bolshevism fattens on military opposition. It will collapse without it..." Koehler's appeal on behalf of the suffering masses in Russia did not fall on deaf ears. Rear Admiral McCully's July 15, 1920 report to the Secretary of State noted, "Recently representatives of a British Fund established by Lady Muriel Paget have established a hospital in Sebastopol, and a British Red Cross and Children's Relief Organization are also at work."

==== White advances, Summer 1920 ====
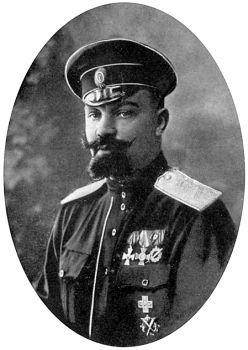
Lt. Gen. Alexander Kutepov of the Volunteer Army

The decisive turn in the fortunes of Wrangel's army, was not the reorganization of his forces, as much as the Polish–Soviet War. The Bolsheviks, recognizing their vulnerability in a two-front war, did not seek to engage the Poles. However, Marshal Piłsudski, the Polish head of state had plans to annex the Ukrainian and White Russian provinces. Negotiations broke down and on April 25 the Poles began their attack, achieving a major victory on May 6 with the fall of Kiev. Vladimir Lenin complained, "In the Crimea Wrangel gathered more and more strength. His troops consisted almost entirely of officers in the hope that in the first possible moment the army would be expanded by entrance of peasants. Wrangel's army was equipped with tanks, cannons, and airplanes better than all the other armies which had fought in Russia. While we fought the Poles, Wrangel gathered his forces." While Wrangel's army tried to solidify its holdings in the northern Tauride, Koehler spent much of July and August sorting and translating the trove of documents he had snatched from Bolshevik headquarters in Melitopol, with a brief visit to the front on July 20. The tide again turned against Wrangel's forces in the middle of August, when the Polish forces defeated the Soviets on the outskirts of Warsaw. After the Battle of Vistula, with nearly 70,000 Red soldiers taken prisoner, the ensuing peace with Poland signalled the eventual end of Wrangel's regime, with the full force of the Red army now freed to focus on the Crimea. But the end was still a couple months away, and on August 27, Koehler left by train from Sebastopol to Melitopol, where he called on General Kutepov at his First Army headquarters. "Even General Kutepov himself with all his indomitable energy plainly showed from overwork... He explained that although strictly military considerations might demand a withdrawal from the present extensive front on account of the heavy cost in casualties in holding so long a line against superior numbers, he felt that political conditions and loyalty to the inhabitants of the occupied territory who had aided Russian forces (and many of those younger men were now in the army), demanded that the Tauride be held at almost any cost."

White army soldiers executing two civilians

Perhaps Koehler did not see, or chose to overlook another side of Kutepov, his "sworn brother", who along with Pisarev, commonly executed people without trial and for minimal cause. Earlier that year, as military governor of Sebastopol, his number of executions and cruelty sparked complaints among the peasants and civic leaders. One particularly egregious instance, was the hanging of a young Tartar poet, accused of nothing but vague, Bolshevist sympathies. Complaints were sent to Wrangel, and rather than investigate the claims, Wrangel summoned the mayor of Sebastopol before him. Recalling in his memoirs years later what he told the politician, Wrangel wrote, "I know all about your disagreement with General Kutepov, who is merely carrying out my orders. I am not going to discuss with you who is right, or which of us two has given orders. I am responsible to the Army and to the people, and I follow the dictates of my science. I am quite sure that were you in my place you would act differently; but as it happens destiny has given me and not you direction of the Russian Cause, and I will stop at nothing in the accomplishment of my duty, and I will not hesitate to cut down anyone who tries to stop me. You protest because General Kutepov has hanged a score or so of men who were a danger to the Army and to the Cause. I warn you should the necessity arise I would not hesitate to increase the number by one, and that one would be you." During the Russian Civil War, many White generals and a number of the Bolshevist leaders developed a great propensity for cruelty and summary executions. They came to believe in violence for the sake of violence, to send a strong message to the enemy. It likely was counterproductive, as it only alienated and frightened the silent majority of citizens, while firming the enemy's resolve.

Leaving Melitopol, Koehler went to Feodorovka and visited the headquarters of General Pisarev, Commander of Third Corps. As Koehler sardonically described the meeting, "He reviewed the military situation and seemed confident of success of his encircling movement, begun some two days before with the object of breaking through in rear of the advancing Red column and then surrounding it. Present tactics, both Bolshevik and Russian, represent nothing so much as a giant game of cross-tag: each side attempts to cut in behind the other, then to outflank the other's flanking column, then again to outflank this outflanking, flanking column-- and so on..." Koehler described the front line he visited in August 1920, "Whenever I arrived on the fighting line, I found the division commander and his chief of staff in the front line or ahead of it, instead of in their classic post two miles in the rear. I noted a general of artillery with a rifle wound in his leg and a saber cut in the head, certainly a most unorthodox proceeding, but here the artillery is immediately behind the infantry if not on the line with it.... Under cover of machine gun fire, the entire Russian line now took up the advance, moving in echelon at good speed... We now gained a slight eminence from which we had an excellent view of the entire movement, including the retreat of the Reds. [The Whites] were outnumbered about 3 to 1, but in actual battle the Red superiority in numbers really had comparatively little consequence on this front; they had encountered some single regiments that were worth more than other entire divisions. However, in maneuvering and the possibility of exerting a general pressure all along the line, numbers were of course, very valuable. The general said that regiments composed entirely of Communists invariably fought well, as also did the Latvians and certain international regiments made up mostly of Magyars...." On August 27, Koehler was awarded the Order of St. Vladimir, fourth class, with swords and bow by Kutepov. A telegram from General Vladimir Vitkovsky that was found in Koehler's papers years later reads, "With the feeling of sincere pleasure I learn that you have been awarded, sir, with the Order of St. Vladimir, 4th Class, with swords and bow and congratulate you with this high award, which commemorates the day of your visit to the fighting line of my corps." This, and two other Russian Imperial decorations, were among the last awarded to a foreigner or a Russian for that matter. As Koehler's published historiographer wrote, "The strict neutrality of the American Mission, so scrupulously adhered to by Admiral McCully, was evidently less than a pressing concern for the Commander."

Soldiers of the anti-Bolshevik Volunteer Army before the Mark IV tank 'General Drozdovsky', South Russia 1920

Red cavalry, ca. 1920

Red troops with captured Medium Mark B tank, ca. 1920

Kuban Cossacks in the Russian Civil War, showing the variety of cherkesskas and beshmets worn

South Russia Volunteer Army armored train "Kalita"

Red army soldiers, ca. 1920

White armored train "United Russia"

White army volunteers, ca. 1919

Khabarovsk during the Russian Civil War

Koehler's conversations with peasants and townspeople in the Tauride yielded insight into the comparative failure of both the Reds and the Whites to improve the economic fortunes of the common man. Asking a farmer the price of wheat, as he complimented the man on the quality of his grain, Koehler was told, "Who could tell?" he answered. "He went on to explain that Bolsheviks took it for nothing, Wrangels forces offered sheaves of paper money for it- if that was standard, he added critically, it evidently must be worth something. Yet Bolsheviks came a long way for it, and Whites were extraordinarily anxious to get it, so it must have value for everyone except the man who had grown it." Koehler concluded that the conditions in "Red Russia" had been harder on the townspeople than the peasants. "The more I learned directly of conditions in Red Russia... the more evident it becomes that it is townspeople who suffered most from the Bolsheviks and conditions brought about by the Red regime. They gladly welcomed the Russian troops and quickly aligned themselves with the new Wrangel regime. peasants, although they suffered a certain loss from seizure of grain and horses, and although bitter against mobilization, nevertheless in general never suffered any hunger or the many requisitions of clothing, linen, household effects, and about everything else of value townspeople had to endure; nor have they seen at close hand the conduct and methods of the commissars... In these years the man who produces from the soil is king- even in Red Russia... But the spirit of the townspeople is broken- their brains and wills are as weak and starved from lack of food as are their bodies- sufferings have left them exhausted. Once these townspeople get sufficient food inside them to restore stamina, and when the interior weakness of bolshevism gives them an opportunity, they must restore commerce and industry, yet the latter would also restore the towns- and strengthened, people would no longer submit to the tyranny they have suffered for years. So even in its success, bolshevism contains the elements of its downfall. The millworker in Alimovka expressed the idea of thousands when he said that formerly the Russians had a czar, a fool, to rule them, [and] taxes were very bad, but bread was five kopeks a pound and plentiful, and a man could get all the shirts, and shoes, and sugar and tea and tobacco he wanted. Now Russia was ruled by very clever men, [and] there were no taxes at all, but bread was 500 rubles a pound and scarce, and neither shirts nor shoes nor sugar nor tea nor tobacco were to be had."

==== Crimea, September–October 1920 ====
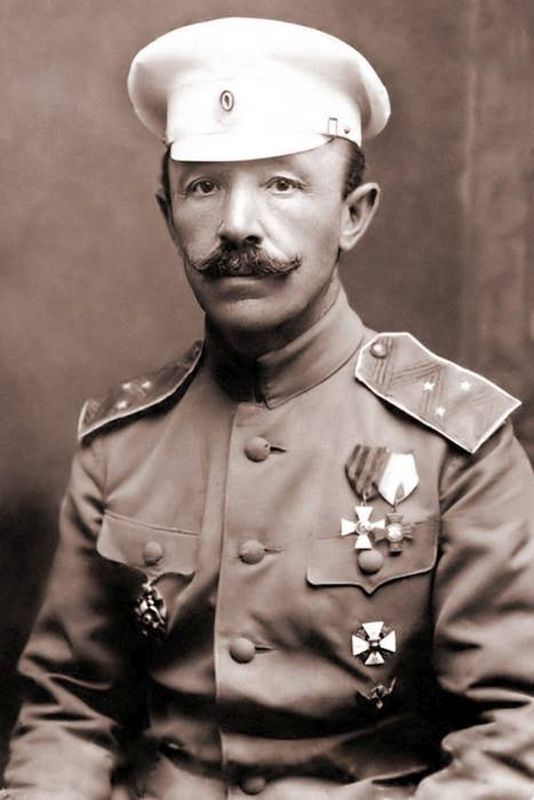
Gen. Ivan Barbovich

Koehler was back at the front two weeks later, taking the train to Melitopol and meeting with General Kutepov, who told of the White's capture of Alexandrovsk and seizing military assets of armored trains, 14 steamboats, 2,000 horses, 1,000 railroad cars and 33 "hot" (operational) locomotives, along with scores of Red prisoners. Wrangel had reorganized his White army into Kutepov's First Army, consisting of the Volunteer Army, old Don Cossacks and the Second Army under General A.P. Dratsenko, consisting of the old Second and Third Corps and a Terek Cossacks brigade. Wrangel also formed two independent cavalry units, led by General Ivan Barbovich and the Kuban Cossack General Nikolai Babiev. At that time, Wrangel's forces totaled 43,900. Kutepov was confident that there were no significant Bolshevik forces between Alexandrovsk, Ekaterinoslav or Kharkov, and felt he could take either town without great effort. He expected to hold Mariupol that he had captured only long enough to destroy the Red naval base, capturing or killing all but 500 of the troops operating in the town. Retreating from there, Kutepov drew Red forces north of Mariupol after him, and captured 4,000 Red troops on October 12, after outflanking them. After meeting with Second Army General Dratsenko, Koehler was optimistic about the prospects of the White army as late as early October. "To draw away the large reserves of Red troops now at Kahovka, First Army has planned an advance from Alexandrovsk into the rear of Nikopol, and as soon as the Reds have withdrawn from Nikopol, all Second Army except Vitkovsky's corps will cross (the Dnieper River) at Nikopol and advance towards Berislav, while Vitkovsky's 34th Division will attempt a crossing at the French monastery 25 versts below Kahovka, and 13th Division ... will storm Kahovka... If this plan succeeds, the Russians will probably shift the whole First Army to the southeastern flank and attempt an advance into the Donetz.... which if successful would mean the military power of bolshevism had come to an end."

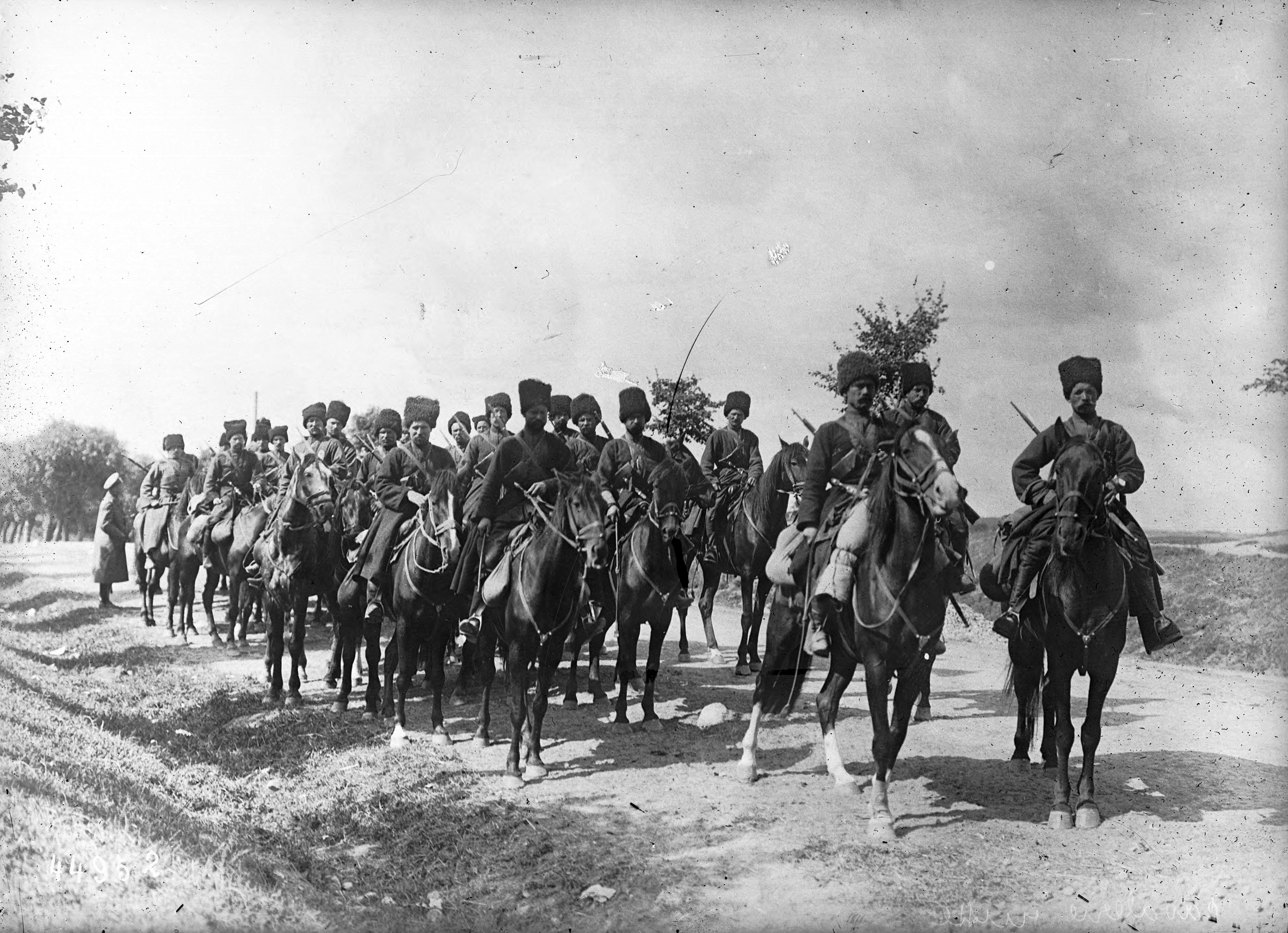
Russian cossacks on the front. 1915

During a cavalry inspection, Koehler described witnessing the Cossack lava movement, "I had seen the lava, the famous Cossack attack, before, but never with the dash and spirit of [Second Brigade commander and Don Cossack], General P. M. Agaev. Forming his bodyguard and transport train into the "enemy", he sent them in one direction and his own force disappeared in a cloud of dust in the opposite direction. Thirty minutes later we noted, from our position on the top of an old Tartar burial mound, a mass of cavalry approaching in a solid formation. This mass soon spread into a long, thin line, which came on at a gallop. In the meantime, the enemy came and in a brilliant charge pierced the advancing line, which then split into two parts that retreated to the flanks, apparently in considerable disorder. At this point, the reserve hidden behind the advancing line suddenly came into sight, but on seeing the advancing enemy, it too wheeled and beat a hasty retreat with the enemy in hot pursuit. As the enemy pressed forward, the second reserve suddenly swept down and engaged the enemy in front, while the retreating first reserve, which had made a rather wide turn, now attacked on the enemy's flank while the two parts of the first line, which had retreated in apparent disorder, now came plunging in from the opposite flank and the rear, thus attacking the enemy from all sides at once. The result was a melee of men and horses, sabres and lances, banners and streamers, a whirlwind of dust. If battle is half as dangerous as this maneuver appears, one wonders how there can be any enemies of Cossacks left." During the inspection of the Cavalry Corps, Koehler witnessed General Wigran's entire brigade, cavalry, artillery and machine gun detachments charge up the reviewing hillock, and led by the general, give a rousing cheer, "America, America". Koehler learned it was the result of his giving a transcript to General Kutepov of a lengthy address by the Secretary of State that acknowledged the U.S. "strongly recoils [from] recognition of the Bolshevist regime," going on to say, the "United States feels that friendship and honor require that Russia's interests must be generously protected and... [we] have so instructed [our] representative in Southern Russia, Rear Admiral Newton A. McCully." During that time, Koehler heard a "great amount of favorable comment concerning this note and the work of the American Red Cross..."

White Volunteer Army infantry, ca. 1920

On October 6, Dratsenko's army crossed the Dnieper at Khortytsia, to the surprise of the Reds who did not expect a crossing there, and giving a momentary advantage as Dratsenko's forces captured Red troops and threatened communication lines. A couple days later, Koehler witnessed the crossing of the Dnieper by Kutepov with a shock force of three infantry and three cavalry divisions, writing in his report, "The crossing of the Dnieper on October eighth and the advance into the Ukraine was one of the most interesting operations I saw, as it perfectly illustrated General Kutepov's methods. On the previous day I had seen the capture on Chertisa Island... former stronghold from which the old Zaporogian Cossacks directed raids against rich towns from Constantinople to Poland...At daybreak, as soon as the opposite shore could be made out, artillery began a brisk fire followed by all the noise the single machine gun company could produce. Twenty minutes later, at three of the most difficult places to get across- on account of the width and depth of the river-- the army began its crossing, Red artillery meanwhile pouring in an overwhelming fire on the ford being so carefully avoided. Result was one division across at a cost of eleven men wounded and en entire cavalry corps and another division crossed with no casualties whatsoever. Within forty minutes some nine hundred Bolshevik prisoners were busy hauling White Russian artillery across the river... I kept on with General Babiev's cavalry and by nightfall... counted over 3,000 prisoners..."

Semyon Budyonny's Red Army First Cavalry, ca. 1920

Although peace negotiations between the Poles and Soviets only began on September 21, Wrangel knew he had to make his push across the Dnieper, realizing that Marshal Semyon Budyonny's First Cavalry would arrive from the Polish front to join with Red commander Mikhail Frunze's Sixth and Thirteenth Armies and Second Cavalry, headquartered at Kharkov, dramatically increasing the numerical advantage of the Reds. As observed by Koehler, the White army's operation came "within an ace of success" but it was not to be. After the capture of 3,000 Reds on October 11, Babiev's cavalry outflanked the thorn of Kahovka while Wrangel's First Army under Kutepov north of Melitopol cut elements of the Soviet Sixth and Thirteenth armies to ribbons. Then key events conspired to doom the operation. On October 13, Wrangel ordered a frontal assault by General Vitkovsky on Kahovka. Inaccurate aerial reconnaissance reported sparse defenses; however, the city was heavily defended and Vitovsky's tanks were destroyed. As Babiev's Cossacks were about to surround the city, he was killed by an artillery shell, thoroughly confounding and demoralizing his Cossacks, who began to retreat. This, in turn, caused the inept Second Army commander, Dratsenko, to order a general retreat back to the left bank of the Dnieper. When the Whites regrouped on the left bank, they found that the Markov and Kornilov divisions, General Babiev and his cavalry, Barbovich's corps, and the Sixth and Seventh Infantry divisions had been crushed and abandoned on the right bank. On top of these failures, news reached Wrangel that the Poles and Soviets had signed a peace treaty the previous day, October 12. Wrangel's forces began a steady retreat and any designs on spreading into the Ukraine were finished. Koehler returned to Sebastopol on October 17, as once again, thousands of beaten and despondent Whites retreated toward the narrow Perekop Isthmus and Sivash straights that separated Crimea from the northern Tauride. On the day of the Red's first offensive, October 28, they had 99,500 infantry and 33,700 cavalry to the White's 23,000 infantry and 12,000 cavalry- nearly a 4 to 1 advantage. They also outnumbered the Whites 2 to 1 in guns and machine guns. In a matter of days, the Reds reached the Tauride. Wrangel ordered all available men to defend Perekop and ordered Kutepov to return and attack from the West. Kutepov's forces did as ordered, but when a Red force broke through on the Ushun sector, Kutepov withdrew into Crimea rather than risk encirclement.

White army exodus from Crimea, ca. 1920

A week later, Koehler was in Yalta with McCully who wrote in his diary, "Summer is definitely over, although Koehler still goes in swimming." Wrangel had hoped that the tidal marshes at the neck of the Crimea would hold back the Bolsheviks, but a series of very low tides drained many and a cold spell froze over the rest, so that the Reds poured over, sending his remaining forces into full retreat to Sebastopol and a desperate rearguard action. He described the end of his campaign, "I gave the order in October 1920 for retreat. The troops fell back by forced marches on the seaports and embarked according to a plan previously arranged. The civil population, those who served in the rear, the sick, the wounded, women and children, were the first to be put on board. The evacuation took place in perfect order. I inspected personally on the Cruiser Kornilov the harbours used, and I was able to assure myself that all who wished to quit Russian soil found it possible to do so." At the time of the collapse of the White army, "mustang" rear admiral and early naval aviator Jackson Tate was a "lowly ensign" attached to the USS Borie (DD-215) off Sebastopol. He recalled writing a set of orders for himself "to escort the Princess Olga Sargieff Rostigieff, Rear Admiral McCully's secretary, out of the Crimea," a well-laid plan, until Koehler got wind of it. "Hugo Koehler tore up the orders and said HE was escorting the princess and I was assigned to escort out three children on the [destroyer] USS Overton (DD-239). There were over three thousand people aboard, mostly standing on deck. The children were not at all popular with the C.O. of the destroyer. They- and most of the refugees- had "cooties", the nickname at that time for body lice... I saw little of Koehler. He was a very dapper and dashing individual and quite a lady's man. He spoke excellent Russian and was very highly thought of by Admiral McCully."

==== Sebastopol, November 1920 ====
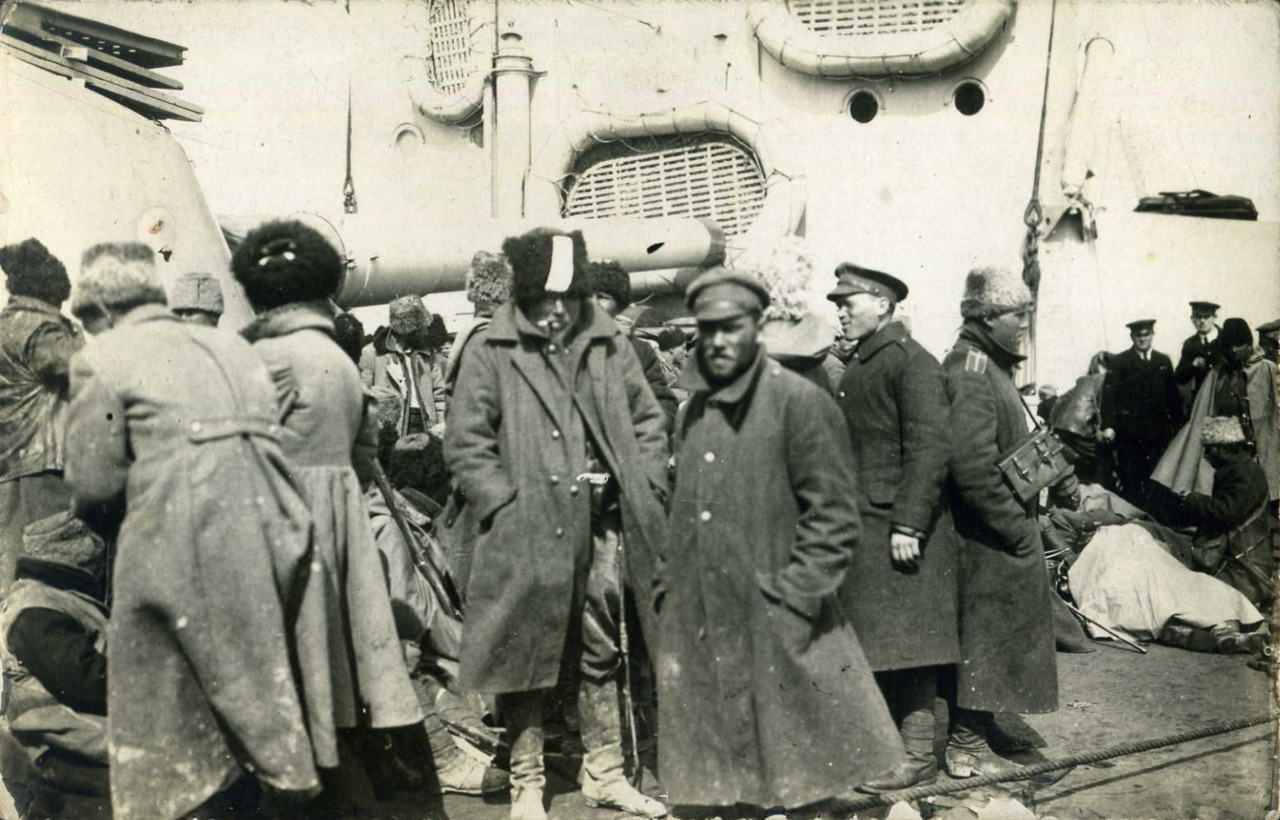
Soldiers and cavalry of Wrangel's White army evacuate from Sebastopol, November 1920

His work on the Mission to South Russia completed, on November 1, 1920, Koehler sailed for Constantinople. After that, he made a yachting trip to Egypt. The destroyer Overton, was already at Sebastopol when the Bolsheviks defeated Baron Wrangel's White Army in November 1920. Overton distributed relief supplies, provided transportation and communication services, and relocated refugees. A single ship could not cope with the massive influx of desperate people fleeing the fighting; however, and the Americans furthermore feared for the safety of their people trapped in the war. McCully cabled a request to the State Department, asking that the United States be allowed to assist in the Evacuation of the Crimea. Not waiting for a response, he ordered Cdr. Alexander "Sandy" Sharp of the destroyer USS John D. Edwards (DD-216) to load a group of refugees and stand out for Constantinople with a letter request to Admiral Bristol for more ships. With 550 Cossacks, women and children gathered from the Sebastopol docks, Sharp's destroyer stood out for Turkey. During the voyage, the Russians were spread out on the ship and ravenously wolfed down everything the navy cooks served up. Upon receiving the letter, Bristol gave emergency orders for the destroyers USS Fox (DD-234), USS Humphreys (DD-236), and USS Whipple (DD-217) to cease various operations in the Black Sea and immediately stand out for the Crimea to assist in the evacuation. The Americans nonetheless required additional ships and cabled for reinforcements including USS St. Louis (C-20).

USS Whipple (DD-217) in drydock at Constantinople, with her captain, Lt. Cdr. Richard F. Bernard USN (left)

Standing up the Bosporus from Constantinople on November 13, 1920, St. Louis rendezvoused with destroyer USS Long (DD-209), and U.S. steamships Faraby and Navahoe, and the four vessels worked with other ships to rescue the Americans authorized by McCully to escape. Besides McCully's party, the ships pulled out U.S. consuls and their archives, representatives of the American Red Cross and YMCA, relief workers from other agencies, and approximately 1,400 Russian refugees from Sebastopol and Yalta in the Crimea, Novorossiysk, Russia, and Odessa. On the morning of November 14, the destroyers dispatched by Admiral Bristol from Constantinople arrived at Sebastopol to find hundreds of mostly Russian and French boats in the harbor, many of which were crammed to the gunwales with fleeing White Russians. Whipple, Lt. Cdr. Richard F. Bernard, commanding, stood by to evacuate selected individuals bearing passes from McCully. Whipple's main battery was trained out and manned at all times. Armed boat crews carried evacuees out to the ship while her landing force stood in readiness. As her last boatload pushed off from shore, Bolshevik troops reached the main square and began firing on the fleeing White Russians. Whipple was the last American vessel out of Sebastopol, towing a barge loaded with wounded White Russian troops. When she was beyond range of the Red guns, she turned the tow over to Humphreys. Passing Admiral McCully's destroyer, he bellowed from the bridge through a megaphone, to Bernard and his crew, "Well done Whipple." General Wrangel stayed on a quay until all who wanted to leave Russia had done so, before he embarked on the Russian cruiser Admiral Kornilov (1887) and sailed into exile, eventually settling in Belgium. It is estimated that between November 1920 and the end of 1921, the Reds executed between 50,000 and 150,000 Russians in the Crimea. St. Louis returned her evacuees to Constantinople on November 16. The following day, her crew formed boat landing parties to distribute food among refugees quartered on board naval transports anchored in the Bosporus. General Wrangel moved nearly 150,000 Russian refugees and crewmen on board 80 former Imperial Russian Black Sea Fleet ships and merchantmen into exile, initially to the harbor at Constantinople. Lt. Hamilton V. Bryan supervised sailors and marines, including those from St. Louis, who helped care for these people, until many of the exiles sailed for Bizerte, Tunisia.

Rear Adm. Newton McCully and his seven adopted Russian children, with Navy Secretary Josephus Daniels, January 1921

During his ten months in Russia, Rear Admiral Newton McCully had seen great suffering among the children in South Russia, particularly those that were orphans. He decided to adopt seven of them, and would have taken a dozen more if he could have. Navy Secretary Josephus Daniels referred to McCully's benevolence as "the big act of a big man with a big heart". McCully left Yalta on Overton, the last U.S. ship to leave the Crimea; his orphans had departed earlier on another destroyer. Over the next few weeks, McCully again tried to no avail to get the State Department to offer asylum to additional Russians. Travelling home with his young charges and their 29-year old governess on the oiler USS Ramapo (AO-12), McCully wrote in his diary, "We are off on the biggest adventure I ever undertook- an old bachelor with seven children." The admiral was required to post a $5,000 bond for each child, while they were detained at Ellis Island. Ultimately, the admiral conquered the bureaucracy and as a solution to filling "the big job of supplying the necessary feminine influence in their lives", the admiral married their governess.

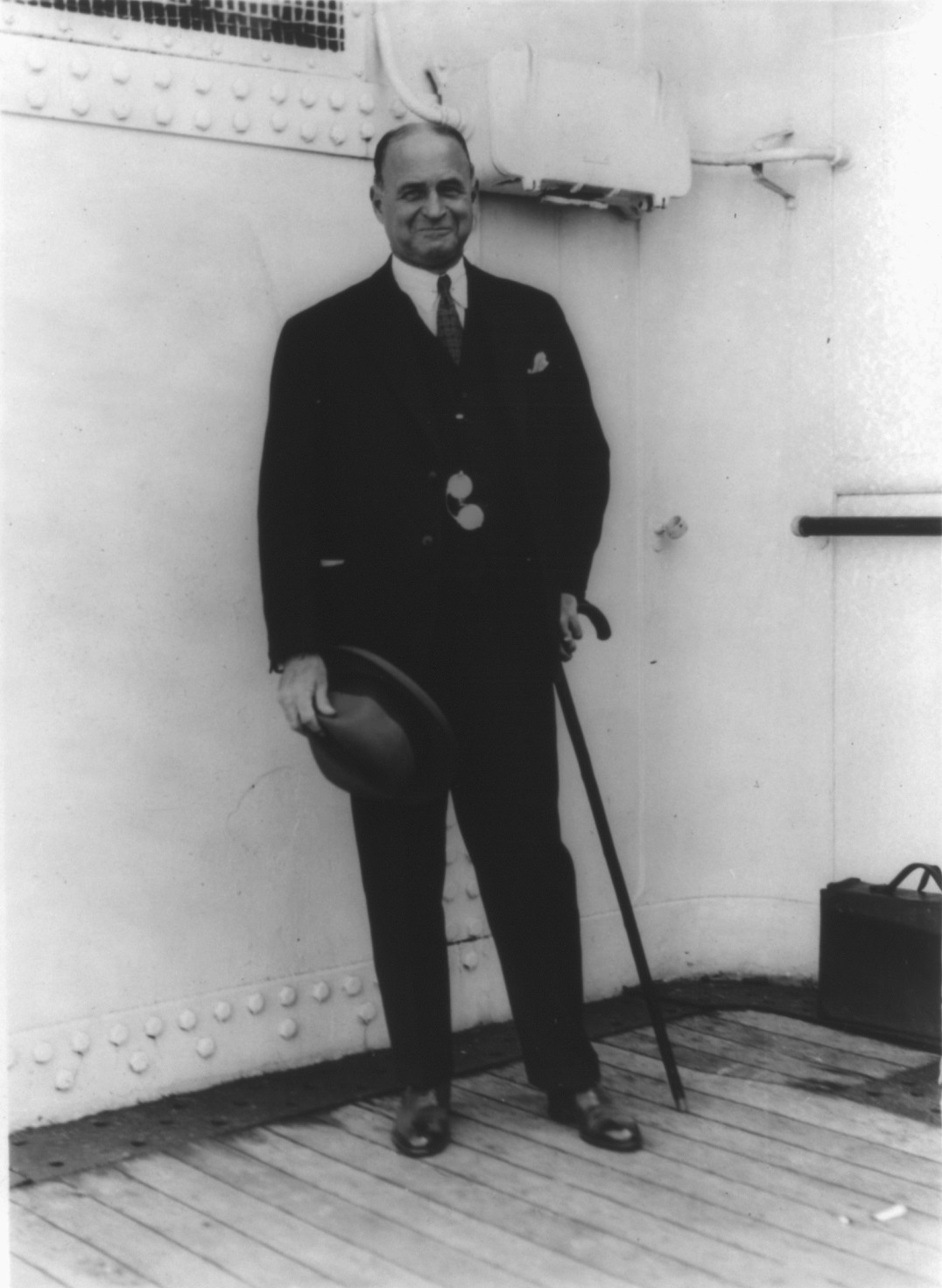
Admiral Mark L. Bristol

In Constantinople, the city was deluged with the displaced Russians from the Crimea. Admiral Mark Bristol set up a disaster relief committee to coordinate the various American relief efforts that continued for many months. Sailors from the admiral's flagship, St Louis, worked with his wife, Helen, and her committee of women and constructed a soup kitchen in the train station at Stamboul. They fed 4,000 refugees daily that were being brought in for housing in makeshift camps. Restroom facilities and a dressing area for the women refugees were set up. Doling out hot chocolate, tea and bread, Helen Bristol and her women, worked in rain and mud to keep their canteen open past midnight. Ultimately 22,000 Russians were cared for by the Americans and housed in different parts of the city. Much larger contingents of British and French aid workers did similar good.

Appropriately, Koehler returned to the United States from Europe aboard the RMS Aquitania, nicknamed "Ship Beautiful" for the society passengers she carried, sailing from Southampton and arriving at New York with 3,000 passengers on January 30, 1921, after a rough six-day, eleven-hour passage averaging 20 knots. Also making the crossing were Sir Ernest Shackleton, Antarctic explorer and author, Sir Philip Gibbs, British war correspondent, Vice Admiral Harry M. P. Huse, USN, Sir Major-General Sir Newton James Moore KCMG and Clare Sheridan, sculptor and first cousin of Sir Winston Churchill, who had been in Russia sculpting busts of Lenin and Trotsky, The British Foreign Office had loudly opposed Sheridan's trip to Russia, denying her a British passport and almost forbidding the journey. Koehler met her on the ship as she was sailing to America to give lectures on her Russian experience. On the first day of her arrival in New York, Koehler took care of her young son, Dick, while she met with reporters, agents and others.

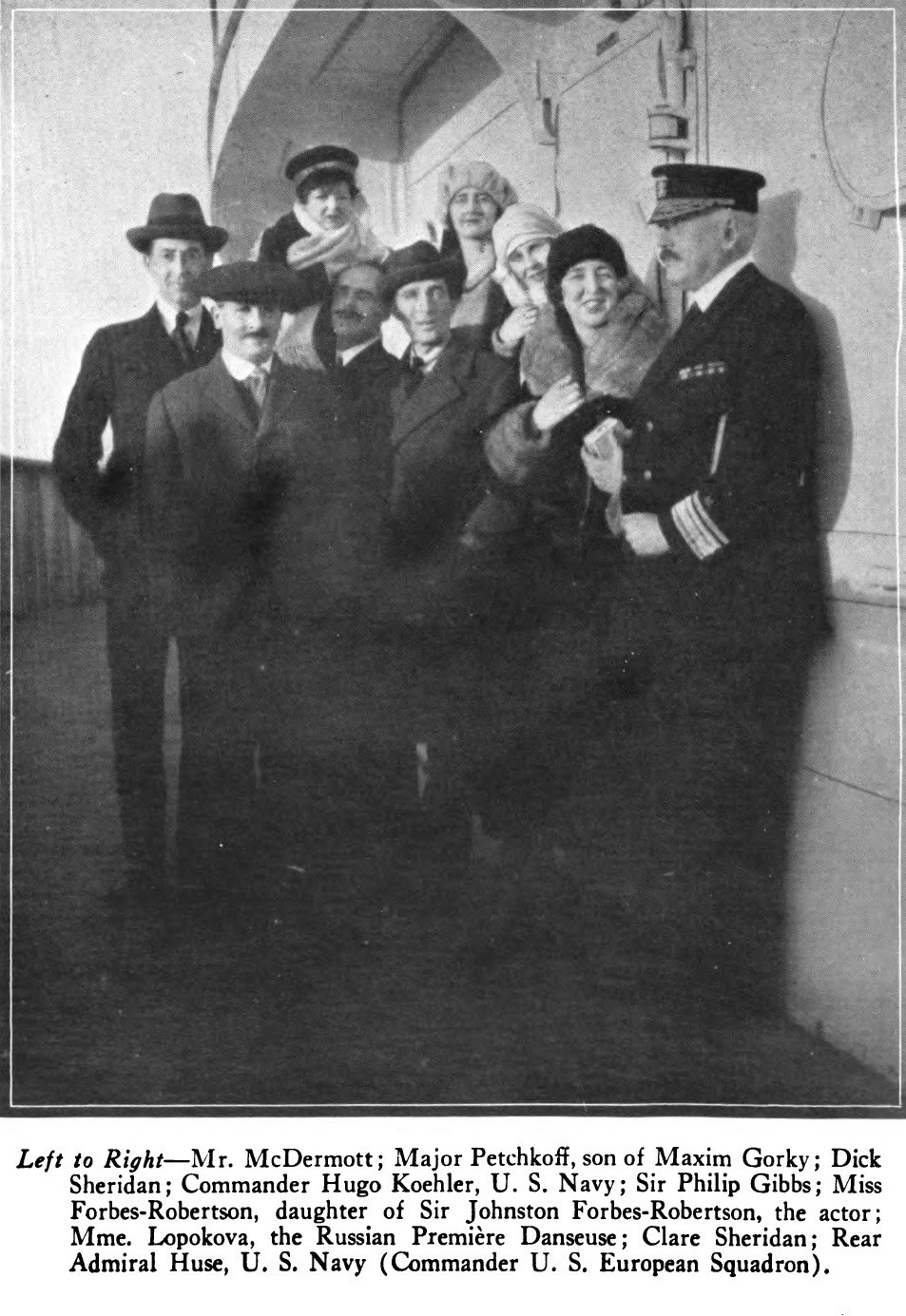
Clare Sheridan, Hugo Koehler (holding up her son, Dick), Rear Adm. Harry Huse and others, aboard RMS Aquitania, bound for New York City from Southampton, January 1921

In her diary, Mayfair to Moscow, published in 1921, Sheridan described Koehler as "heaven sent", writing that "Koehler promised to be at my side in case of need. He was amazingly kind and put up with infinite boredom and waiting on our account." In a letter Koehler wrote from Poland in 1922, he mentioned an incident that reminded him of the "famous Mrs. Sheridan at whom the Foreign Office thundered so loudly... and yet be it known (although this, of course, is closely guarded) that she was an agent for the British Intelligence Service."

It was speculated, but later disproved, that Koehler may have been able to smuggle the Imperial family out of Russia. This was the subject of the book Rescue of the Romanovs by New York journalist Guy Richards, that was published in 1975. Beginning in July 1921, the monthly periodical The World's Work published a series of four articles by Hugo Koehler describing his observations during the Russian Civil War in 1920 and the defeat of the anti-Bolshevists. Koehler's belief that the Russian people would soon work through and cast off Bolshevism for a prosperous, free-market economy, while in line with the pro-business theme of the host publication, proved to be overly optimistic.

=== Naval Attaché to Poland ===
Koehler was promoted to permanent lieutenant commander on June 3, 1921, and appointed naval attaché to the American Legation at Warsaw, Poland, in August of that year, to aid the State Department in monitoring the beginning of international relations between divided-Russia and Poland. Koehler described the practical aspect of his job, as spending a year "combing Europe from one end to the other with no purpose more definite than to see what's really happening on the theory that might give us some idea of what's going to happen." His passport, signed by Secretary of State Charles E. Hughes contained over sixty visas stamped during his assignment. From 1795 to 1918 and the collapse of its neighboring nations, Poland had been variously controlled by Imperial Russia, Prussia and Austria-Hungary. The new republic of Poland that was outlined by President Wilson in the thirteenth of his Fourteen Points in January 1918, and agreed at Versailles the following year, included parts of the former Russia, the Congress Kingdom and Kresy. The diverse ethnic groups of White Russians, Lithuanians, Poles and Ukrainians, along with small concentrations of Jews made up the new country. The area of the new state ceded from Germany included the agrarian regions of Pomerania and Posen, plus the industrial regions of Prussian Upper Silesia. From Austria-Hungary areas of West Galicia and Austrian Silesia were designated for the new Polish state. The goal of establishing a unified nation from these diverse regions, with differing taxes, varying public education (to the extent it existed) and transportation infrastructure, was compounded by the destruction of six years of war on both cities and farmlands.

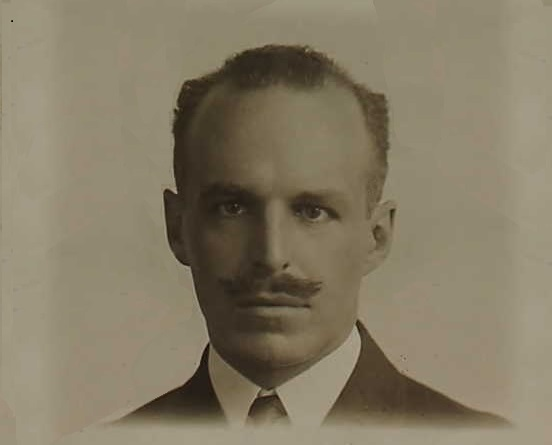
Hugo W. Koehler in 1921

In a letter to Capt. William Galbraith of the Office of Naval Intelligence in early November, 1921, Koehler wrote of driving from Warsaw to Danzig, where he "passed in and out of Germany and Poland so often that we soon lost count of the number of frontier stations." Motoring from battle-scarred, Brest-Litovsk he wrote that, "The most interesting thing there was the scrawl on the wall of the room where the Bolshevik treaty with Germany was signed. 'Neither Peace, nor War.' it reads, and is signed 'Leon Trotsky, December 1917, Brest'- certainly not a bad estimate of the situation, especially so, considering the date." Heading on towards Baranowicze, Koehler's party travelled through miles of burned land, for which he observed that, "[I]n accordance with age-old Russian strategy the armies laid waste the countryside as they retreated... Wonderfully thorough they were, these poor Russians, in destroying their own houses and fields." Arriving at the border, they found "a long line of prairie schooners coming in. 'Is this Poland? Are we out of Russia? God be praised!' came again and again in the same jabbering Russian, Polish and German. It happened that in this crowd were German colonists from Russia. They had been in Russia for many generations, they had never mixed with the Russians but kept close together in their little farm colonies along the Volga.... I talked to one peasant who was under twenty-seven although he looked over forty- and small wonder, for he had tramped over five thousand versts and during the last stretch had dragged the cart himself, as the Bolsheviks had taken away his horse. I examined the cart he had brought all this distance and with so tremendous an effort. An old bed, bits of sacking, an assortment of battered pots and pans, an old sheepskin, part of a wolfskin, rags, nine potatoes, a handful of radishes, some pieces of tallow- nothing else. The complete inventory would not net a dollar; he explained that he had had a cow but the Bolsheviks had taken it away from him at the border. Yet he was much better off than thousands, for having been out in the open he was in comparatively good health although drawn and wasted, whereas the others who had come back by train were feeble and diseased and bleeding from bites. The children of course, were the most tragic sights. They are young only when they smile."

In his travels through Germany, when Koehler met German women with babies, he would ask them if they were raising them to be canonenfutter (cannon fodder). Invariably, they would respond, " 'No,' indignantly. But on further talking, they would just as invariably intimate that these boys would have to someday fight as their fathers did, because the French would not let them do otherwise.Frankreich muss noch weinen." ("The French will be made to weep again"), Koehler heard over, and over. He saw that Germany was selling its goods below the actual cost of production, and that while full employment might postpone the "crash", when it came it would be harder due to Germany's weak financial condition. "To pull through, Germany will need statesmanship wiser than the greed of manufacturers that has been the directing force since the Armistice. As it is, the German people seem blighted with the curse of false leaders, for the interests now at the helm, though more greedy than the old, are less farsighted; and again the German people will suffer for their lack of ability in choosing leaders...." A French officer travelling with Koehler for part of his journey, expressed bitterness seeing "all the smiling fields, and all the beautiful villages, and all the sturdy Germans working so industriously, all the busy factories at Düsseldorf and Essen and the Ruhr..." while "he thought of devastated northern France." The sight of the German resolve and energy "struck terror to the soul of my French friend," prompting Koehler's conclusion that, "The tragedy is not only that the French do not realize that by keeping an army beyond their means they are weakening themselves, but the fear and terror that they all feel makes it impossible for them even to understand it until that terror is removed."

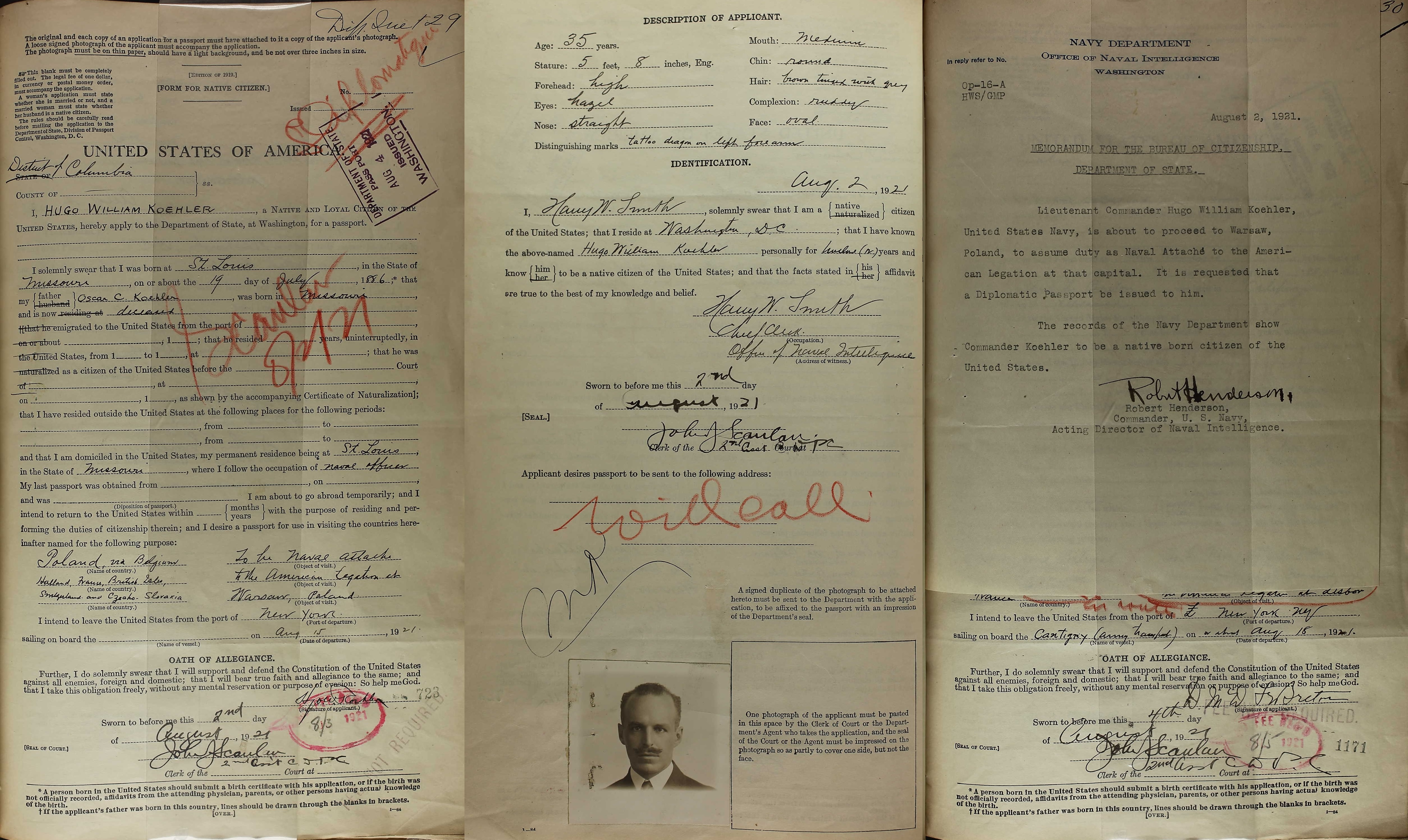
Lt. Cdr. Hugo Koehler's Diplomatic Passport Application, Naval Attaché to Poland, August 1921

Journeying through Poland, Koehler engaged in discussions of the viability of the new Polish republic. "And over and over again one hears it stated that if there had been any real vitality in the idea of a Polish nationality, the Poles would long ago have thrown off the yoke of the oppressors they hated so bitterly. But however sound these statements may be in themselves, I do not find they quite fit the Polish situation. It is all very well to say that a country should itself throw off the yoke if it aspires to nationhood, but when all is said and done, once Poland was partitioned, it was really impossible for Poland to rise until at least one of the oppressors had fallen. It is true that a country must itself achieve its independence, since the fundamental character of independence is that it cannot be received as a gift.... Poland has been reborn and has a fine start in life, but whether or not Poland will ever arrive at manhood depends entirely on the Poles. There is no royal road to knowledge, we were told as children, nor is there any royal road to manhood or statehood." Koehler recalled the "feeling in General Wrangel's army when the Poles were advancing to Kiev. Although Wrangel's men were fighting for existence against the Bolsheviks, in the hardest and bitterest kind of fight, still there was a time, at the height of the Polish advance, when the feeling in Wrangel's army was such that they would almost have made common cause with the Bolsheviks rather than see the Poles advance into Russia."

In a letter to his mother, Mathilda, written in July 1922, Koehler recounted that, "In the forest region there are many Jews in the little villages that here consist usually of a single row of houses around a square instead of the single, very broad street of the Russian style. I heard many complaints against the Jews: that they did no real work, no farming, no cutting of wood, yet they became rich on the labors of the peasants. 'If they do not farm and do not cut wood, then what do the Jews do?' I asked a peasant. 'Oh, they buy stolen logs and trade stolen horses and sell vodka,' was the answer. 'You wicked anti-Semitic propagandist!' I reproached him; but his only reply was that just nine days before, his brother's horse had been stolen and found at a Jew's house seventeen versts away, and that currently everybody knew that Jews bought the stolen logs and cattle as well as the horses. 'But the peasants must steal the logs first in order to sell them to the Jews,' I answered. 'Yes,' he admitted, 'but if the Jews did not buy, the peasants would not steal.' I told him the parable about the pot and the kettle, but he was not impressed."

Koehler recalled a particularly humorous encounter with frontier posts and visa stamps that again demonstrated his prodigious ability to persuade and manipulate. Motoring to Kovno, about ninety minutes after crossing the Lithuanian frontier and a small army post where Koehler's retinue had asked directions, they came upon a line of soldiers with bayoneted rifles gesturing urgently. An officer approached and told them they would need to go back to the frontier outpost for Koehler to have his passport stamped. Not wanting to backtrack over "very bad roads" and delay the trip for this bureaucratic exercise, Koehler "refused point-blank to go back but added that I would be glad to go to any station in the direction of Kovno, my destination." Ultimately taking the phone himself, he "talked to various regimental commanders, divisional commanders, and goodness knows what, all of whom repeated that the frontier was closed inasmuch as Poland and Lithuania were at war, and that I could therefore not have passed the frontier. In reply I suggested that the mere fact I was in the middle of Lithuania ought to be sufficient evidence that I had crossed the frontier. I replied that I would not go willingly and that under the circumstances I considered that the same international law that applied to blockades also applied to a frontier; that is, that just as a blockade in order to be binding must be effective, so it was with a frontier." Standing his ground, Koehler's suggestion that he should be allowed to proceed to divisional headquarters (on the way to Kovno) was finally agreed to. Reaching divisional headquarters, "the first result was more discussions, telephoning, arguing, and beseeching. But the upshot of it all was that instead of proceeding to Kovno, I was told I should have to wait where I was until the Lithuanian Foreign Office had authorized the visa of my passport... However, as this process promised to take a good many hours if not days and weeks, and as the discussion had already lasted some four and a half hours, I cast about for a happy idea." Koehler matter of factly suggested to the general's adjutant that he had only heard the Polish side of the controversy with Lithuania, and that it might be very interesting on the journey to Kovno to have "a really thorough explanation of the Lithuanian side of the case. The effect of this gentle hint was electric! The adjutant dashed off to his colonel, and within three minutes the answer came back that I could proceed at once to Kovno, and that, if I wished it, an officer would accompany me and show me the way." Koehler arrived at Kovno without further incident.

Lt. Cdr. Hugo Koehler, pictured in the World's Work magazine in 1921

While he was in Poland, it is likely that Koehler coordinated with Polish General Jozef Pilsudski, the dominant leader in the newly independent Polish state, to support the White Army in Russia in its unsuccessful struggle against the Red Army. In this assignment he met the Papal Nuncios to Poland and Germany, Archbishops Ambrogio Damiano Achille Ratti and Eugenio Maria Giuseppe Giovanni Pacelli. The unfounded speculation surrounding these meetings, was that the Vatican and Koehler were discussing the potential for restoration of the Habsburg empire, relative to the rumor that Koehler was the "lost" crown prince. The following year, Ratti became Pope Pius XI, and on his death in 1939, Pacelli was elected to the papacy, taking the name Pope Pius XII. Years after Koehler's death, his widow Matilda told a confidante, "I think it was a shame how they got his hopes up." In February 1922, Koehler was witness for his friend Hugh S. Gibson, American minister to Poland, at Gibson's wedding to Ynès Reyntiens, daughter of Belgian Major Robert Reyntiens, who had been Aide-de-camp to King Leopold II, in Bruxelles. During the week of October 15, 1922, American diplomatic representatives in Middle and Western Europe, including Koehler, met in Berlin at a conference called by the U.S. Ambassador to Germany, Alanson B. Houghton, to discuss the current state of affairs in their particular countries and work towards more cohesive cooperation in their missions. Two days before his assassination on December 16, 1922, Koehler's personal friend, the newly elected, first Polish president Gabriel Narutowicz had expressed great interest to him in the work done in America to establish a national park system, and asked Koehler for information concerning policies and methods, with a view towards establishing a system in Poland patterned after the National Park Service in order to preserve Poland's extensive forests, and in particular, those in the Carpathian Mountains. Narutowicz asked Koehler to prepare articles for publication in Poland concerning the American national parks.

Returning to the United States several days later, on leave before his next assignment, Koehler visited his mother, Mathilda, in Davenport, Iowa, during the Christmas holidays and gave an interview to the local paper. Titled "Worse Times Coming in Germany", Koehler saw Germany at the beginning of a period of economic deflation following the hyperinflation that had existed since the Armistice. While the current economic situation made it doubtful there would be any significant rise in exports to Europe, Koehler believed there was great future trade expansion potential since the old and new European nations did not believe the U.S. was "animated by ulterior motives". He noted that America loans money to those nations, not "loans" in the form of imported goods made in Britain as the British did. He saw Germany paying the price of Anglo-French political maneuvers in the Near East, where the English were defeated in their diplomatic backing of Greece, as the French were victors in their backing of Turkey. That victory gave the French the courage to insist on their strong army policy towards the Germans. The balance of trade that was formerly in favor of Germany, was now against it, which augured ill for German prosperity. He reaffirmed his belief that Russia "will eventually escape domination of the bolshevik" but saw no possibility of ever reverting to a monarchy, since the peasants, who had "appropriated many things in addition to land" would resist it. Koehler saw Poland as "economically wealthy" with its tremendous natural resources of timber, oil, coal and mining, but "financially poor" for supporting a very large standing army and a close alliance with France. Politically, he regarded the situation in Poland as "perplexing", with 17 political parties, and strong political minorities of Germans, Russians, Jews and Ukrainians. He noted that 90 percent of the emigration from Poland was Jewish. Koehler opined that while all European nations worried over the invasion threat of the Red army, they were "bluffed" since it was defensively, not offensively strong. "The Russian army has no artillery, no aviation force, no means of supply and while it could defend Russia effectively it could not campaign efficiently in an aggressive way," he stated. Commenting about "The Terrible Turk", Koehler felt it wasn't so "terrible" after all. "There isn't any danger in the present alliance between the Turk and the Bolshevik as far as a permanent threat against the peace of Europe is concerned. Mohammedanism is fundamentally opposed to Communism and therefore these two countries cannot remain friendly," Koehler accurately predicted. "Communism is a good excuse for a row but a poor foundation for a stable government," he declared. The recent assassination of the Polish president, Narutowicz, a Lithuanian by birth who had been conciliatory in resolving the boundary dispute with Lithuania that followed the Poles taking of Vilna was a serious blow to the country's future, Koehler believed. "America has done an enormous amount of good for Poland and for other new countries of Europe in its relief work, work that will eventually react to the benefit of the United States. For two years we fed over a million children in Poland and they are tremendously grateful to us. The American businessman doesn't pay much attention to his foreign trade. We are too indifferent to find out the real market conditions. But we have great latent possibilities there as a result of our national activities in the past few years, possibilities which we will eventually capitalize."

== Later Navy career ==
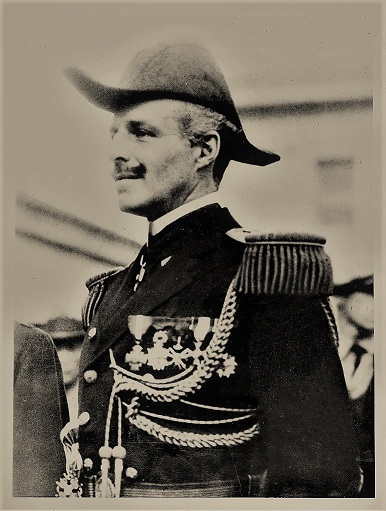
Lt. Cdr. Hugo Koehler wearing Navy Cross, Russian Imperial and other foreign decorations, ca. 1925

Following his service in Russia and Poland, the remainder of Koehler's naval career was more typical. He left Davenport bound for Boston on December 29, 1922, with orders to the battleship USS Utah, flagship of Battleship Division Six, Scouting Fleet, based on the Atlantic Coast where his billet was first lieutenant. He stopped in Washington at the offices of the Department of the Interior to convey the Pole's interest in conserving their public lands to officials there. On his way to the West Coast for his next naval assignment, Koehler made it a point to stop at several national parks to gain personal knowledge before writing the articles that his late friend, the assassinated Polish president Gabriel Narutowicz had asked him to write. In June 1923, he was appointed aide to Vice Admiral Henry A. Wiley, commander of the battleship divisions of the United States Battle Fleet with his flag on the Battleship Division Five flagship, USS New Mexico based at San Pedro, California. Ten years earlier, then Commander Wiley had been Koehler's commanding officer when he was an ensign aboard the Asiatic Fleet flagship, Saratoga. In November 1923, Wiley was president of the largest naval court martial to date, as eleven officers of Destroyer Division 11 were prosecuted in San Diego for their actions that resulted in the Honda Point disaster. Several months later, on June 12, 1924, disaster again struck the Battle Fleet when the forward Gun Turret No. 2 of the USS Mississippi exploded during gunnery practice off San Pedro, killing 48 sailors in the worst U.S. Navy peacetime disaster to date. The next evening, Koehler, as vice-secretary of the battleship divisions, made the announcement of the large funeral service to be held near the Los Angeles harbor and that the next of kin of all those killed had given permission for their remains to be held for the joint memorial service, with both Catholic and Protestant chaplains taking part. A week after the explosion, a board of inquiry conducted aboard New Mexico and presided over by her commanding officer, Captain Yates Stirling Jr., delivered its findings of "unavoidable accident" to Vice Admiral Wiley and made recommendations to avoid such future accidents, including greater precautions in handling the magazine powder and equipping gun turrets with escape hatches.

On October 30, 1924, Wiley shifted his flag from New Mexico to the recently constructed battleship USS West Virginia. The following month, both Wiley and Koehler gave an interview to the Los Angeles Times for an article titled, Coast Defenses Planned to Make Southland Safe- War Dept. Expects to Have Los Angeles Invulnerable to Enemy Attack. "As long as the Battle Fleet is out here, Los Angeles is as safe as Omaha. Take away the fleet and I wouldn't give a nickel for it," Wiley stated. Koehler, referred to in the article as Wiley's aide and "one of the Navy's best men on military strategy", expanded on the statement, "As long as this fleet is in being the Pacific Coast needs no coast defenses. The point of defending our country is not in waiting until the enemy crosses the sea, but to get out and whip the tar out of him before he gets here. No amount of coast defenses, however modern or of what immense range, would save the Pacific Coast if the fleet were not in being. It was thought in 1914 that the defenses of Namur were absolutely invulnerable, that they were the most modern in the world, yet the Germans cracked them in forty-six hours. The same was true at Liège and Verdun. On the other hand, land fortifications are sometimes essential. They are essential at Hawaii because Hawaii is vital to the existence of the Battle Fleet and they are vital at Gibraltar because they can forbid the passage of the Mediterranean." During Koehler's time aboard West Virginia, the battleship made a cruise to the South Pacific. He held that assignment until September 1925. Thereafter, he remained at Balboa, Panama, where he directed the Balboa Naval Transmitting Station, a VLF-transmitting station for relaying orders to submarines that had begun service around 1915. While in Panama, Koehler's mother, Mathilda, visited him.

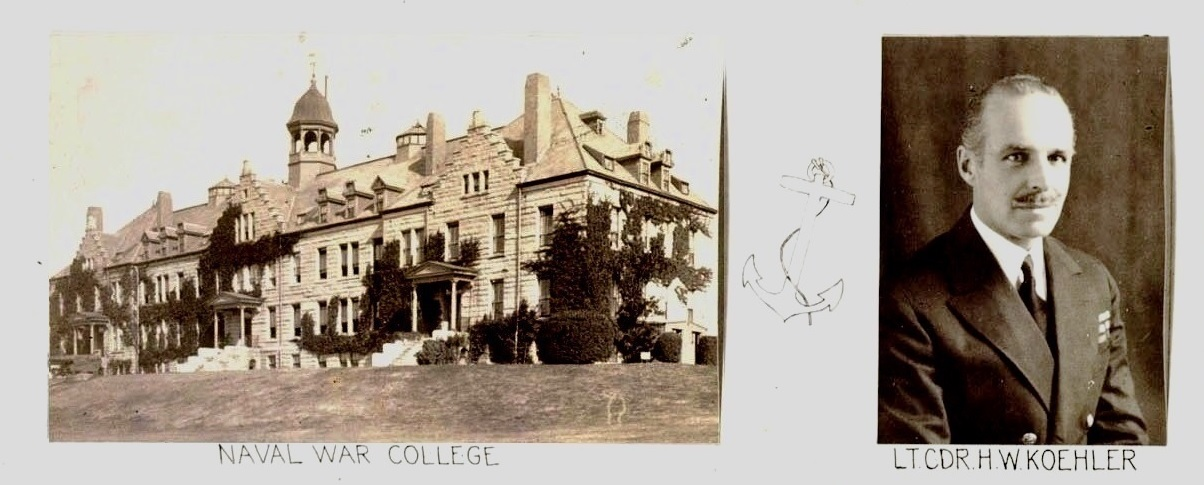
Lt. Cdr. Hugo Koehler, member of teaching staff at the Naval War College, 1926-27

He was assigned as an instructor at the United States Naval War College in Newport, Rhode Island on April 17, 1926, and remained there until October 1927. In this capacity he was able to share the lessons he learned from his experiences in Russia and Poland with future admirals in the U.S. Navy, including Raymond Spruance. On April 29, 1927, he delivered a lecture, "Developments in Russia" to the graduating class at the Naval Academy. He gave lectures on the techniques in intelligence gathering under the new method of instruction that started with Rear Admiral William V. Pratt's tenure as president of the college. Pratt admired Koehler for his "great mental ability," remarking that the Commander was "different, a clash of wits and brains. To be with him, was always mental refreshment for me." Jackson Tate described Koehler as, "very much of a specialist... rather than... regular Navy". Koehler's exploits were widely known and his legend grew as his naval career diminished to the ordinary. Rear Admiral Kemp Tolley, who was a young officer in the Asiatic Fleet during the 1930s, recalled an anecdote of Koehler's time in South Russia, "[Admiral McCully] had notified one of the destroyers in his command (in the Black Sea) that he would be aboard shortly. So the OOD (officer of the deck) was of course alerted to watch out for any approaching boat. Naturally, he was much astonished to hear shouts in the water some time later- from McCully and Koehler. They had swum out in the buff."

Matilda Bigelow Pell Koehler, ca. 1920's

On June 2, 1927, Koehler married Matilda Bigelow Pell (1895–1972), the divorced wife of former New York Democratic Congressman Herbert C. Pell (1884–1961), whom he had met several years earlier. They were married at the Madison Ave. Baptist Church on East Thirty-First St. in New York, having obtained a marriage license only hours before. Other than the minister, Rev. George C. Moor, the only others present were the bride's brother, Anson Bigelow and his wife. The marriage came as a surprise to most of their society friends, since the previous week, Matilda Pell was adamantly denying rumors of a pending marriage to a naval officer. She had obtained her divorce from Herbert Pell in Paris, the previous March. Pell remarried in Paris a couple weeks later. Coincidentally, on the day of his marriage, Koehler was promoted to commander.

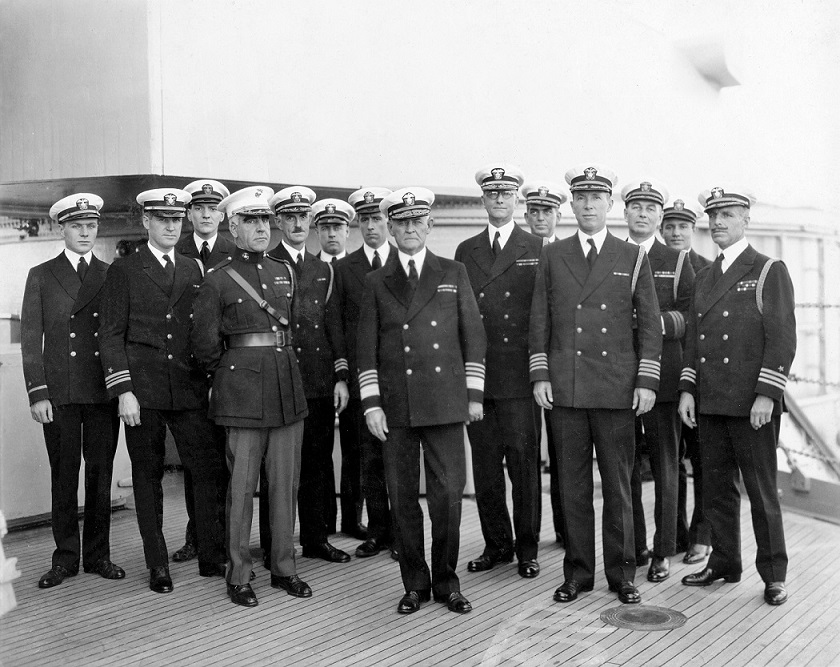
Adm. Henry A. Wiley and his flag secretary, Cdr. Hugo W. Koehler, USS Texas (BB-35), Nov. 7, 1927

Hugo Koehler and his son, Hugh, 1929

On September 3, 1929, their only child, Hugh Gladstone Koehler, was born. Named for Koehler's close friend, Herbert Gladstone, 1st Viscount Gladstone, Hugh Koehler became an investment banker and lived in Connecticut, before he died in 1990 shortly before his 60th birthday. Matilda's only child from her previous marriage, Claiborne Pell (1918–2009), later served as a Democratic United States Senator from Rhode Island for 36 years (1961–1997).

On November 3, 1927, Koehler was assigned as flag secretary to the staff of the commander-in-chief of the United States Fleet, Admiral Wiley, whom he had served under twice before and who was impressed with Koehler's character and code of conduct. Recalling the incident early in Koehler's career where he had personally funded the payroll for other officers in the Asiatic fleet, Wiley stated years later, "It was commonly understood that Koehler went deep into his own pocket to relieve these young people. They were not particular friends of his. I know of no incident that could better illustrate the man's generous nature." This was Koehler's final duty station, since he announced his resignation at the end of December 1928, and requested a separation date of February 14, 1929.

== Post Navy life ==
Herbert Gladstone, 1st Viscount Gladstone and Hugo Koehler

Ever the romantic, Koehler's explicit request that his retirement from the Navy take effect on Valentine's Day telegraphed at least one motive for resigning his naval commission. It was a gift to his wife, since Koehler realized that even if he landed his dream assignment, naval attaché to Moscow, the aristocratic Matilda would not appreciate life in Russia or the long months when he would be assigned sea duty. After his resignation from the Navy, Koehler assumed the life of a socialite. His friend, Lord Gladstone, had warned Koehler against retiring from the Navy without a challenging, second career alternative, adding, "If you were in our Navy, you would now be an admiral." The man who had been a driven professional became an avid dilettante. The Koehlers divided their time between an apartment at 510 Park Avenue in Manhattan and in Newport, where they spent most of the summer along with other members of New York society, and purchased an estate "cottage", "Wyndhurst", that they later sold in 1928. Koehler raised orchids and tried his hand at pineapples and bananas in a small greenhouse. He bought expensive antique furniture and gold snuff boxes. Unfortunately, Koehler's purported Austrian trust income had ceased once he married Matilda. In August the previous year, Koehler and his brother and four sisters each received an approximately $18,000 distribution following the termination of a trust fund that had been set up by their father. With the Wall Street crash in 1929, money suddenly became tight. As one acquaintance said, "They both thought the other had money and both were fooled."

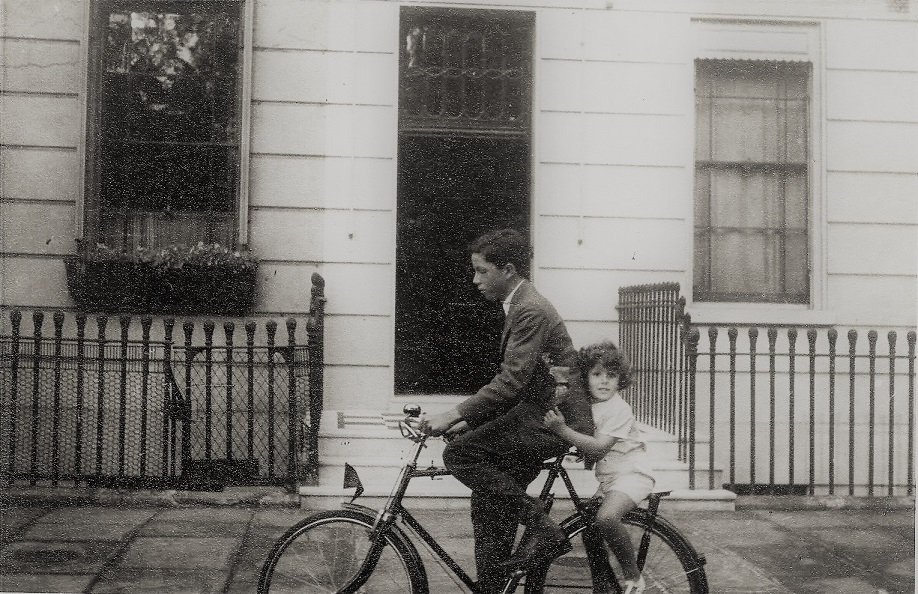
15-year old Claiborne Pell and his half-brother, Hugh Koehler, summer 1933, London

The couple moved to England, where they spent most of the year, and Hugo fully embraced the lifestyle of the British gentry with his many society friends there. While living in England, Koehler travelled to Moscow and had multiple meetings with Joseph Stalin in 1933. The substance of these meetings, that were probably set up by British Intelligence is not known, but Koehler was impressed with Stalin from their conversations. Koehler had predicted the rise of Stalin in 1920, when he wrote, "All Russia is on the lookout for this dictator and every new leader that crops up is examined in the light of his aptitude for the job." Given Koehler's penchant for intrigue, he may have been asked to perform other intelligence assignments during his retirement. In 1934, Hugo, Matilda, his fifteen-year old stepson, Claiborne Pell and five-year-old son, Hugh, returned to America, in large part because Herbert Pell did not want his son raised as an Englishman. In 1936, the Koehlers purchased "Eastover", a thirty-acre estate off Wapping Road in Portsmouth, Rhode Island, with a 1,000 ft. waterfront on the Sakonnet River, where Hugo planted raspberries, built a sea wall, tended a flock of sheep and made a rose garden for Matilda. His son, Hugh, had chickens, a dog and a pony named "Broadway Bill". Known as "Commander Koehler", he and Matilda Koehler were frequently mentioned in the society pages of The New York Times, and they continued to maintain their apartment on Park Avenue. While the Koehler's and their sons were part of the wealthy Newport social circuit, attending dinner parties and giving them at "Eastover", Matilda was bored by Hugo's navy friends, and her Newport crowd was unnerved by the mysterious and overly exotic Commander. While Koehler's eccentricities probably delighted Stalin, Kutepov and scores of long-forgotten cossacks, the Newport set was not enchanted by them. During one party at "Eastover", Koehler bit the rung of a chair in two, to demonstrate to Matilda that it was "weak" and of "inferior construction". He would consume entire lamb chops, bone and all, to the disgust of his fellow diners. As Koehler's historiographer wrote, "He could easily have done the Greek waiter's trick of picking up a small, dinner table in his teeth, and dancing with it, without spilling the wine from the brimming carafe."

Hugo and Matilda Koehler

=== Public speaking ===
Koehler was a popular, local speaker in Portsmouth and Newport Rhode, Island during the late 1930s and up until his death, sounding the warning against the rise of fascism in Europe and Asia and the danger of isolationism. In an address titled, "Soviet Union- For What?", in January 1938, Koehler spoke to the "Monday Night Club" in Newport about his personal experiences and observations in Russia during 1920-21 and his meeting with Stalin in 1933. Stalin predicted to Koehler that America would achieve socialism more quickly and directly than the Soviet Union. Koehler recalled Russia in the years after World War I, when the White Russians and Bolsheviks battled for control of armies driven into the sea as they tried to reach the Crimea, and of the great famine and atrocities that were "unhappily too true." He opined that the Bolsheviks were spurred on by an idealism of liberty that they had never enjoyed, put their hearts into the fight, and won. Sent by the State Department to Russia, Koehler described his trip disguised as a Jewish peddler, on foot across Russia to Poland, and his studies of the masses. Among the good points of the Bolshevik program, he pointed to the work-to-eat edict, education of the masses, and hospitalization for the children. But he condemned the segregation and disruption of families, organization of an industrial production program and abolition of the labor unions. Koehler said that the Bolsheviks considered unions and family life as a "menace" to communism. "There is more inequality in Russia today than under the old regime," he declared. Recalling his interview of Stalin, who asked questions about America, and warned Koehler to "Read Marx", he told of the Soviet leader predicting the U.S. would become a socialist state in the near future.

In September 1938, Koehler addressed the Newport Art Association on the subject "Is Europe Headed for War; Are We?" and made the initial point that "Japan will probably continue to have victories of the kind that lead to defeat." His second point was that in a year Japan had "succeeded in giving China a unity that not all the centuries gave her." Koehler asserted that the Chinese with a bayonet is superior man to man to the Japanese. The Japanese have agreed with the Fascist powers and the German advisor to Chiang Kaishek, General Von Falkenhayn, who had been forced to withdraw from China because of pressures from Japan, told Hitler that Germany "has been backing the wrong horse" in Asia. Koehler observed that a militant Italy was a lesser threat than Germany with its greater population and resources. He considered life under bolshevism to be worse than life under fascism. Concerning the immediate problem of Hitler's annexation of the Sudetenland, Koehler reasoned that Czechoslovakia would get little support from the other nations of the Little Entente for fear of exposing themselves to attack from Germany. Britain, however, would not fail to be on the side of France if war broke out. He believed that under advisement of his high command, Hitler would "continue to capitalize on the fear of war and keep Europe in turmoil for some time to come and up to this day he has gained as much by bluff as he could get by war and without the disastrous cost of war." Koehler's closing remark was half-accurate as history has borne out, "He will not resort to war. War would be the end of Hitler."

Matilda Koehler with Mr. and Mrs. James Russell Lowell at Belmont Park, September 23, 1939

Speaking before the Fleet Reserve Association in February 1939, Koehler claimed that following the Munich Pact, Britain was actually in a better position since Neville Chamberlain had succeeded in garnering the support of the British people, including the Labourites. He stated that Adolf Hitler was "bluffing" in September 1938, and would not have forced a war without Italy's support. Overly optimistic, Koehler believed that France had the "strongest army" in Europe and was allied with Britain, but did not want to provoke a war. In an April, 1939 address to the Men's Club of the United Congregational Church (Newport, Rhode Island), Koehler predicted that if war were to break out, the United States would be drawn into it. "Mussolini is afraid of war and Hitler doesn't want it," he said. Taking questions from the audience, Koehler at that time believed that the dictator nations would achieve their goals without engaging other nations in war.

Koehler delivered an address to the Newport Electric Corporation's Men's Club on October 14, 1939, and warned that if the current arms embargo by the United States were not lifted, the war in Europe would be over within a month. Great Britain and France could not continue without U.S. assistance in munitions and supplies. On the other hand, Koehler observed, Hitler "is in a jam" since Germany has to conserve her supplies for a possible later fight with Russia. Hitler's alliance with Russia came at a "stiff price" by alienating Spain entirely and weakening Germany's support in Italy. Had Spain gone along with Germany, Franco could have mobilized an army on the border and forced France to do likewise, drawing men from the German front. "Great Britain", he pointed out, "made a smart move in its trade pact with Russia, in that it can take what it needs, at the same time, keeping these imports and supplies from Germany. "Stalin," he said, "is only interested in Russia, and will be with any country that can put gold into Moscow." Koehler offered that the present British government was "in poor hands" with Chamberlain as prime minister and Sir John Simon as head of the treasury, since both men believed in keeping arms spending low. Aside from Britain "blundering" in its negotiations with Germany preceding the war, Koehler observed that Britain made a strategic error in "building battleships, which are only good to fight other battleships. A blockade could be effected as well with destroyers." He reasoned that Germany had not used its air force to break the embargo due to the high cost of ammunition, as it would require many planes dropping hundreds of bombs to sink a warship. Koehler considered Mussolini "wise" to stay out of the conflict because Italy's "army is not strong enough to make a good showing." As to Gibraltar and Malta, they are no longer the "towers of strength" due to airplanes which could launch bombing attacks in the darkness. Koehler saw the war on the Western Front as being a "perfect stalemate" due to the Maginot and Siegfried lines, overestimating in particular the false impregnability of the Maginot line. As to the German U-boat and aerial offensive, he thought it "possible but not probable" that Britain's blockade would be broken.

Hugo Koehler, shortly before his death in 1941

In a talk before the Newport Art Association in September 1940, Koehler announced, "We are already in the war, even though we are not technically at war, in fact we've been in the war ever since that last November when Congress modified the Neutrality Laws in favor of the Allies. We are in as bad a state today as the French were before their collapse, the basic cause of which was the easy indifference of the masses of the people, their shortsighted unwillingness to get down to hard work and to make the sacrifices that an intellectually honest analysis indicated as indispensable. Do we find within ourselves any evidence of a real willingness to work and to make real sacrifices?" Koehler questioned his audience. "The American Youth Congress inculcates an underlying mood of sullen rebellion in youth against their elders for failure to see to it, that the pleasant and easy-going conditions of these years are continued indefinitely. It would be to rely on the mood of a lot of spoiled children to rely on the youth of today even in part, for the defense of the country. No amount of external armaments can give us safety until first we are strong internally. We need sufficient force to ensure that our help will enable the British fleet completely to control the Atlantic Ocean. Until our planned two-sea navy is ready we should accept the idea that our front lines should not be on our own doorsteps, but close enough to those of the enemy to make the blockade really effective, and now."

Addressing a musician's union local in January 1941, Koehler urged, "We've got to get in, the sooner the better for our defense." He warned that if Britain were defeated, the "problem" would be left with the United States. Calling Samuel Gompers, founder of the American Federation of Labor "one of the greatest leaders of this country", Koehler spoke of the importance of music in life. In one of his last public addresses on the "International Situation", given at Newport before a group of 250 at the "Monday Night Club" in April 1941, Koehler encouraged his audience that, "We as individuals will pour out our treasures until it more than hurts, but it will be worth it." He warned that America must make its stand clear on the lend-lease program, referring to it as a "magnificent gesture", and saying that in the First World War, the "altruism" of the United States was "not appreciated" and was overridden by the national and economic policies and the political expedients of Europe and the East. He called for a "definite policy this time, when the U.S. has the power to demand guarantees of future world stability." He noted that at the end of this war, (World War II) the world will either be totalitarian under Hitler or democratic under Britain. "It is time for clear, hard, Yankee thinking," he said. Concerning the Balkan situation, then the key point of the conflict, Koehler concluded that the various groups were unified for mutual protection: "the Serbs are soldiers (as good as the French in World War I, since they "fight best in a forlorn cause"), the Croats businessmen and the Slovenes are the workers in the Balkans," he observed.

Koehler accurately prophesied the Russians as "a tremendous problem because of their cross and double-cross trickery; their fear that a German invasion would conquer them; and their threat from Japan in the east." "Russia", Koehler continued, "is terrified and subservient to Germany and professes a benevolent neutrality for Japan and Turkey. As to Turkey as a nation, and not the Levantines in Constantinople, Koehler praised their "honesty and determination of purpose". Italy, he said, "is no longer worthy of discussion" and the countries that Germany had overrun, "may be noisy but they cannot and will not revolt".

== Death and burial ==
Gravesites of Hugo, Matilda and Hugh Koehler

With Koehler's hereditary kidney condition rapidly deteriorating, on May 1, 1941, he and Matilda leased "Eastover" to Ralph Stonor and Mildred Sherman, better known as Lord and Lady Camoys and occupied the guesthouse nearby. Hugo Koehler died of Bright's Disease (kidney failure) at the age of 54 on June 17, 1941, at his home on 510 Park Avenue in New York City. He did not live to see America enter the Second World War. Koehler's father, Oscar, had died of the same congenital condition at the age of 45, diminishing the possibility that Hugo was other than his natural-born son. Shortly before his death, Koehler asked Claiborne Pell and Maggie Potter to attend to his desk and spare that sad task from Matilda. All they found was a drawer of unpaid bills, the envelopes unopened, and a packet of sonnets that Potter had written for him years earlier.

Hearing of his death, his old paramour, Dolly Gladstone, remarked, "[I]t is impossible to realize that I shall never see him again. It is as if the sun had ceased to shine." Before he died, Koehler confided to a friend, that he had "missed the boat" and should have gone to Moscow instead of settling for retirement in Newport. But he knew that continuing his naval career would "crucify" Matilda and he simply could not hurt her. "I made a terrible blunder, all the things I should have been but wasn't". Although she loved him, Matilda was a private woman and after Hugo's death she burned the extensive letters that he had written her. In January 1942, Matilda sold their estate, "Eastover", to captain and Mrs. Marion Eppley. Koehler is buried with his wife and son in the Berkeley Memorial Cemetery by St. Columba's Chapel in Middletown, Rhode Island. In November 1942, 25-year old Lt.(j.g) John F. Kennedy, then attached to the Motor Torpedo Boat Squadrons Training Center at Melville, Rhode Island, was mourning the death of his close, childhood friend, Marine Second Lieutenant George Houk Mead Jr., who had been killed in action at Guadalcanal that August and posthumously awarded the Navy Cross. Accompanied by a female acquaintance from a wealthy Newport family, the couple had stopped in Middletown at the cemetery where Hugo Koehler had been buried the year before. Ambling around the plots near the tiny St. Columba's chapel, Kennedy paused at Koehler's granite cross grave marker and pondered his own mortality, hoping out loud that when his time came, he would not have to die without religion. "But these things can't be faked," he added. "There's no bluffing." Two decades later, President Kennedy and Koehler's stepson, U.S. Senator Claiborne Pell had become good friends and political allies, although they had been acquaintances since the mid-1930s during their "salad days" on the same Newport debutante party "circuit" and when Pell had dated JFK's sister, Kathleen ("Kick") Kennedy.

== Personality ==
A young Claiborne Pell with his step-father, Hugo Koehler

Hugo Koehler, by all accounts, had a highly engaging and charismatic personality. Claiborne Pell wrote of his stepfather, "From the time I was nine years old, I lived most of the time, for ten months of each year, in the same house as my stepfather, Commander Koehler. I loved the man. He was a very gifted, very unusual person. On many occasions, I have met people who knew something about his exploits and from them, as well as from my mother and from what I could note myself, I have been convinced that a fine book could be- and should be – written about him. Whoever wrote it, however, would have to dig into areas that are not easy to come by." Although the theory that Koehler was the illegitimate son of a Habsburg prince, separated at birth, is dubious speculation; he was undeniably a dashing, swashbuckling figure enveloped in mystery.

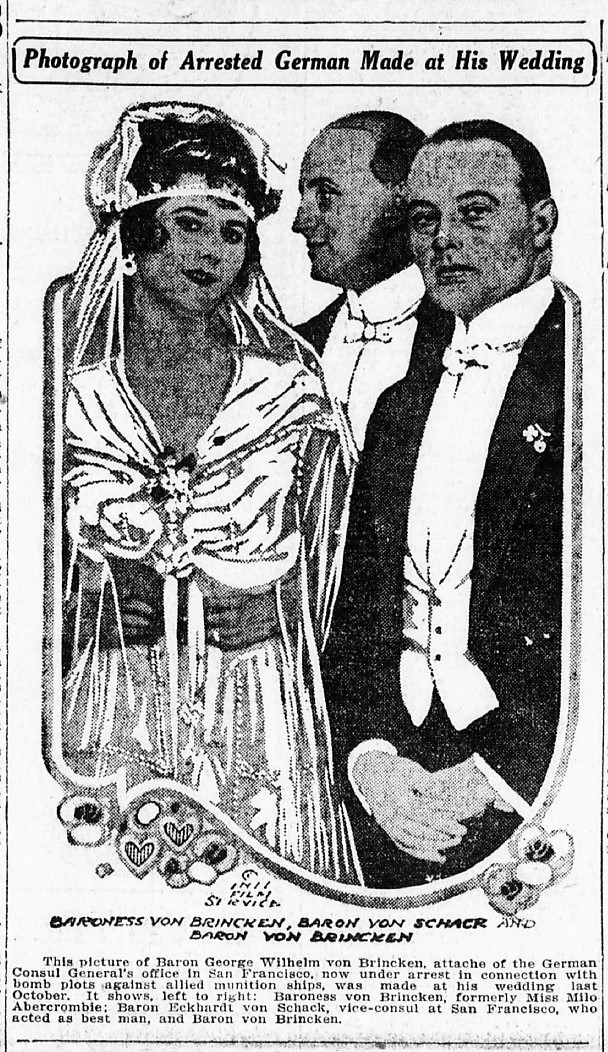
Wilhelm von Brincken at his wedding to Milo Abercrombie in October, 1915

In October 1925, while Koehler was commanding the Balboa Naval Transmitting Station at the Pacific end of the Panama Canal Zone, rumor about his engagement to a particularly colorful, San Francisco socialite and divorcée made national news. Koehler, reported to be "the wealthiest officer" in the Navy, was romantically linked to Milo Abercrombie (1895–1977), niece of John W. Abercrombie, U.S. Congressman from Alabama. Milo was the former wife of the convicted World War One German spy and later, prolific Hollywood movie actor Wilhelm von Brincken. Abercrombie, acclaimed by noted portraitist Harrison Fisher as "California's greatest beauty", had married von Brincken in 1915 when he was a German military attaché in San Francisco. She divorced him in 1919 while he was imprisoned at McNeil Island Federal Penitentiary on Puget Sound. Von Brincken was sentenced to serve two years in the Hindu–German Conspiracy Trial for plotting to foment an insurrection against British colonial rule in India, this sentence to run concurrently with a similar conviction for his alleged participation in bombing and dynamiting plots against the government of Canada. Following her divorce from von Brincken, Milo changed her and their two children's last names back to her maiden name so they would not be "ashamed". In 1920, Abercrombie married a U.S. naval officer, Lieutenant Lyman K. Swenson, at St Mary's Cathedral in San Francisco. Swenson introduced Milo to Koehler in Honolulu when both men's ships were stationed there. In May 1925, Milo obtained an interlocutory decree of divorce from Swenson, to become final in May 1926. In Panama, Koehler read the news stories claiming that he was engaged to marry Milo Abercrombie the following year, in June 1926. Brushing it off, Koehler tersely told the press, "Some error," while Abercrombie did not take it so lightly. "I have been deeply humiliated", she told reporters, her eyes "wet with tears". "This is a most unkind blow of fate. I cannot possibly understand how this false rumor got about." Later, in a bitter child visitation rights battle in 1927 that went all the way to the California Court of Appeals, Abercrombie lost custody of their children, Lyman Jr. ("Robert") and Cecelia, after making baseless accusations that Swenson had molested their four-year-old daughter. The appellate court excoriated Abercrombie, "[I]n furtherance of a manifest determination to prevent him from ever seeing the children again, under any circumstances, she was instrumental in inspiring and promoting a scheme directly involving one of the children which had for its obvious purpose the ruination of respondent's character as a man, the bringing about of his complete disgrace as a naval officer, and the destruction of the love and affection which his children had theretofore manifested toward him." Swenson v. Swenson (1929) 101 Cal.App. 440. Lyman Swenson remarried in 1929 and in November 1942, Captain Swenson was killed in action when his cruiser, USS Juneau was sunk during the Naval Battle of Guadalcanal with the loss of all but 10 of its crew of 673, including the five Sullivan Brothers. Von Brincken died suddenly in January 1946, after appearing in nearly 75 movies following his release from prison in 1921, often cast as a German heavy or spy.

Milo Abercrombie, ca. 1915

Newlyweds Lt. Lyman K. Swenson USN and Milo Abercrombie, on Submarine USS H-6, San Pedro, CA in 1920

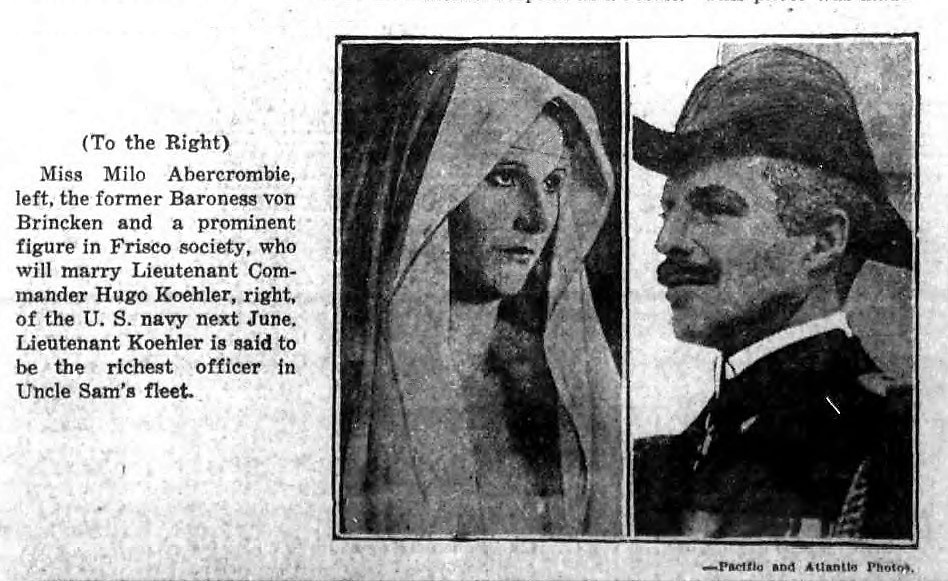
False report of Lt. Cdr. Hugo Koehler's engagement to marry Milo Abercrombie, October 1925

Margaretta "Maggie" Wood (Potter) (1899–1985), daughter of Rear Admiral Spencer S. Wood (1861–1940), was one of the many attractive and socially prominent women that had romantic trysts with Hugo Koehler. It would not be inaccurate to say that Koehler loved women. Maggie Potter met him in 1921 at a Washington dinner hosted by her father, the same year that Koehler met then-married Matilda and Herbert Pell. Wood was twenty-one and Koehler a confident, worldly man of thirty-five. "I fell madly in love with him and I think that he loved me as much as I loved him," she was quoted in Rescue of the Romanovs. They had a three-month affair before Koehler was detached to Warsaw as U.S. naval attache and were engaged to be married on his return; however, Koehler broke off the engagement telling her that she must "forget him". Despite this, Potter remained friends of both Koehler and his wife, and maintained correspondence with him as a confidante until his death. Near the end of his life, Koehler had reaffirmed his Roman Catholic faith and received the Last rites. Maggie Potter gave Matilda her High Renaissance crucifix that was placed in Koehler's hands before he was buried. "I think I knew him better and saw him more truly than did most of his other friends. He was a puzzle for two reasons: his brain was vastly superior to our brains, and he simply did not fit into the American scene. physically he was tall, but squarely built and very strong. When he walked, with rather short steps, he carried his head high, slightly thrown back, and he never watched his feet, as Americans invariably do. He was strikingly handsome, even in his last years, when he was not well and his hair had turned white and his waist had thickened. He spoke English in his deeply pitched voice with a faint German accent. He was one of the best raconteurs and conversationalists I have ever listened to, although this excellence led him to the sin of pontificating, and when there was no one well-informed enough for him to sharpen his wits against, he could be really insufferable."

Shortly before her death in 1985, Maggie Potter recorded her thoughts about Koehler, "As I look back, it is evident that after Hugo's resignation from the Navy, I was his confidante; he would talk and I would listen.... In his apartment in Washington, when I first knew him, there was a bookcase and its three or four shelves were filled, not with books, but with photographs of women. I do not think they were trophies; he genuinely liked and appreciated women and never denigrated ability in a female as many men of that period did.... He said it was stupid for us in Washington to associate with only our friends, who think as we do. One should seek out the obscure midwestern congressman and find out what he thinks, what his motives are. Of course, Hugo was right.... I think I saw him truly. I saw him as he appeared to most people: worldly, flamboyant, out of scale with Matilda's New York and Newport milieu; but also I saw what was behind his protective exterior, a deeply loving man, full of compassion and insight, always ready to help someone else...."

== For further reading ==
In 1992 a collection of Koehler's letters and dispatches to the State Department and the Office of Naval Intelligence, painstakingly researched, compiled and edited by P. J. Capelotti was published as Our Man in the Crimea: Commander Hugo Koehler and the Russian Civil War. The book expands upon Capelotti's earlier research and doctoral dissertation on the subject. It represents the culmination of years of research by Capelotti, and also Koehler's extant writings and the correspondence that Maggie Wood Potter had compiled before her death. Both Potter and Capelotti took on their respective projects at the behest of Koehler's stepson, Senator Claiborne Pell. Capelotti's anthology of Koehler's writings focuses largely on his time in Russia in the years immediately after the First World War. Pell remained determined during and after his long political career, to explore the rumors and shadowy experiences of his step father. Pell's efforts included communicating with the Archdiocese of Vienna in an effort to confirm the existence of an Austrian trust, that Pell believed had been terminated upon Koehler's marriage to his divorced mother; enlisting National Security Agency advisor Zbigniew Brzezinski to investigate Koehler's possible connection to the Habsburgs and retaining an Austrian researcher.

White Russian Cossacks, ca. 1920

In the foreword to Capelotti's book, Rear Admiral Kemp Tolley, naval historian and author of numerous articles and three books on the subject of the U.S. Navy's activities in the Pacific, China, and the Soviet Union, and who assisted Capelotti in the review of his manuscript, wrote about Koehler, "From time to time- not often- there appears on the world's screen an individual of extremely sharp insight, broad powers of observation and analysis, and an unusually lively curiosity. Such an individual was Hugo William Koehler- bold, adventurous, urbane, generous, and with a savoir faire that gained him ready entrance to the highest circles of international society. Something of a prophet, he foresaw the rise of Hitler's Germany, the ensurance at Versailles of a new world war, and bolshevism's inevitable collapse. In that cataclysmic time of world war and civil war, I know of no other American who so intimately associated with Russians of all levels, White and Red. Koehler slept, ate, and galloped over the steppes like a cossack with them, week in and week out, at ease with their personal quirks and characteristics. What those Russians are like and what they might do was revealed with stunning clarity by Commander Hugo Koehler."

== Decorations ==
Commander Hugo Koehler was awarded these orders, decorations and service awards:

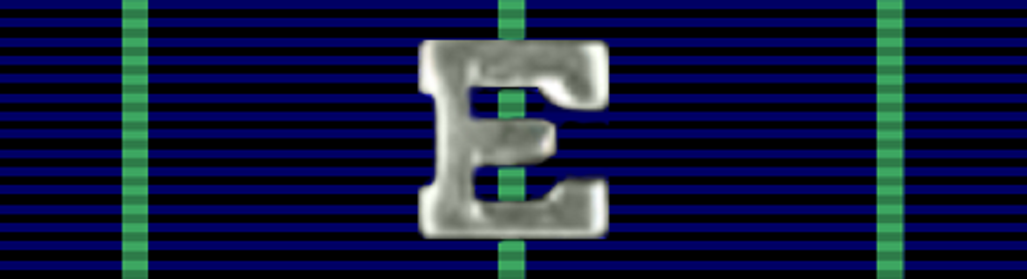

| 1st Row | Navy Cross | World War I Victory Medal with "Subchaser" clasp | |
| 2nd Row | French Legion of Honour, Grade Officer | Order of St. Vladimir (Russia), 4th Cl. with swords and bow | Order of St. Stanislaus, 2d Cl. with swords (Russia) |
| 3rd Row | Order of St. Anna, 2d Cl. with swords (Russia) | Order of the Crown (Belgium), Grade Officer | U.S. Navy Sharpshooter, Expert Badge (1908) |

=== Navy Cross citation ===
The Navy Cross is presented to Hugo W. Koehler, Lieutenant Commander, U.S. Navy, for distinguished services in the line of his profession for duty in connection with preparation of submarine chasers for duty in the war zone and subsequently their operation in the Irish Sea and off the coast of Ireland.

== Dates of rank ==
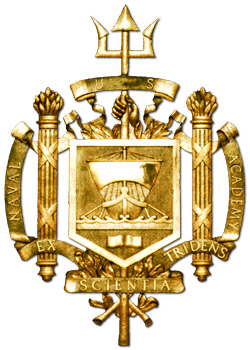
United States Naval Academy Midshipman – July 31, 1905 (Class of 1909)

| Passed Midshipman | Ensign | Lieutenant, Junior Grade |
|---|---|---|
| No stripe or rank device | | |
| June 5, 1909 | June 5, 1911 | June 5, 1914 |

| Lieutenant | Lieutenant Commander | Commander |
| June 5, 1917 | July 1, 1918 (temporary) June 3, 1921 (permanent) | June 2, 1927 |
