= Albert Marshall =

Albert Marshall may refer to:

- Albert Marshall (veteran) (1897–2005), British veteran of the First World War and the last surviving British cavalryman to have seen battle on the Western Front
- Albert Marshall (American football), American football coach
- A. L. Marshall (Albert L. Marshall), American football player and coach
- Bert Marshall (born 1943), retired Canadian ice hockey defenceman
- Albert Marshall (author), Maltese poet and author
- A. P. Marshall (Albert P. Marshall), American librarian and educator
- Albert W. Marshall (1874–1958), American naval officer and aviator

== See also ==
- Bertie Marshall, musician
- Bertie Marshall (cricketer)
