= Louis R. de Steiguer =

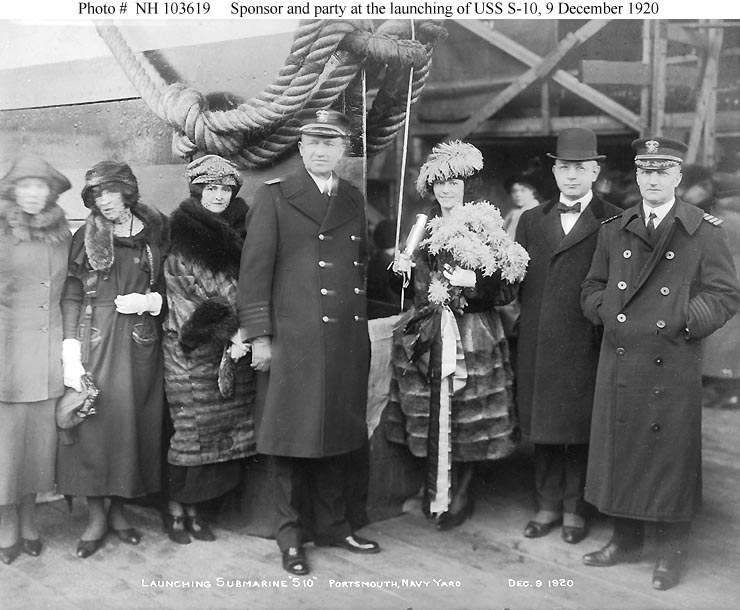
- As Commandant of Portsmouth Navy Yard, at launching of submarine S-10, December 9, 1920.
- Born: March 18, 1867; Athens, Ohio, U.S.
- Died: April 20, 1947 (aged 80); Washington, D.C., U.S.
- Burial place: Arlington National Cemetery
- Military career
- Allegiance: United States
- Branch: United States Navy
- Service years: 1889–1932
- Rank: Admiral
- Commands: U.S. Battle Fleet
- Conflicts: Spanish–American War; World War I
- Awards: Distinguished Service Medal

Admiral Louis Rodolph de Steiguer (March 18, 1867 – April 20, 1947) was an officer in the United States Navy. He was the commander of the Battle Fleet from 1927 to 1928.

== Early career ==
Born in Athens, Ohio, on March 18, 1867, to Judge Rodolph de Steiguer and Mary Carpenter de Steiguer, he was descended from Judge Silvanus Ames, a prominent citizen of southern Ohio. He was appointed to the U.S. Naval Academy from Ohio in 1885. Graduating in 1889, he served his naval cadet cruise aboard the new steel cruiser Atlanta, which sailed with the Squadron of Evolution to Europe, the Mediterranean and Brazil, before returning to New York in 1890. He was commissioned ensign on July 1, 1891, and served in various assignments ashore and afloat, including tours aboard the Vulcan and aboard the Montgomery during the Spanish–American War. Promoted to lieutenant commander in 1905, he was Supervisor of New York Harbor from December 9, 1905, to August 30, 1906; was in charge of the Fifth Lighthouse District in 1911; commanded the Panther through 1913; was acting commandant of the Norfolk Naval Shipyard from September 25, 1914, to January 4, 1915; and commanded the battleship Kearsarge in 1916.

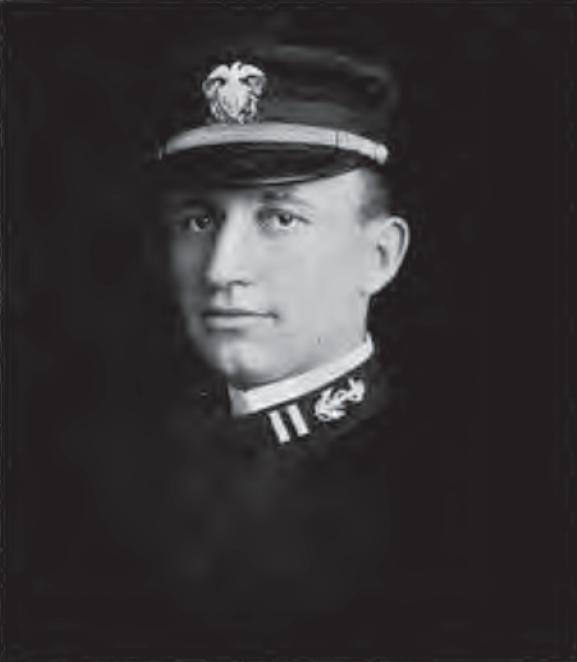
Lieutenant Louis R. de Steiguer

During World War I he served as chief of staff of the Third Naval District before reporting as captain of the battleship Arkansas, which was stationed with the American dreadnought squadron operating with the British Grand Fleet. After the war, de Steiguer was Hydrographer of the Navy from July 1921 to December 1921. Promoted to rear admiral, he was commander of the First Naval District, including the Portsmouth Navy Yard, from June 1923 to 1925.

== Fleet command ==
In June 1925, de Steiguer returned to sea as Commander Battleship Division Four (COMBATDIV 4), with flagship New Mexico, and the following summer he was promoted to temporary vice admiral as Commander Battleship Divisions, Battle Fleet (COMBATDIVS), with flagship West Virginia. On September 10, 1927, de Steiguer assumed the temporary rank of full admiral as Commander in Chief Battle Fleet, United States Fleet, with the flagship California.

Following his tour as Battle Fleet commander, de Steiguer "fleeted down" to his permanent rank of rear admiral and served as commandant, Brooklyn Navy Yard from July 2, 1928, to March 18, 1931. He retired in 1932.

== Legacy ==
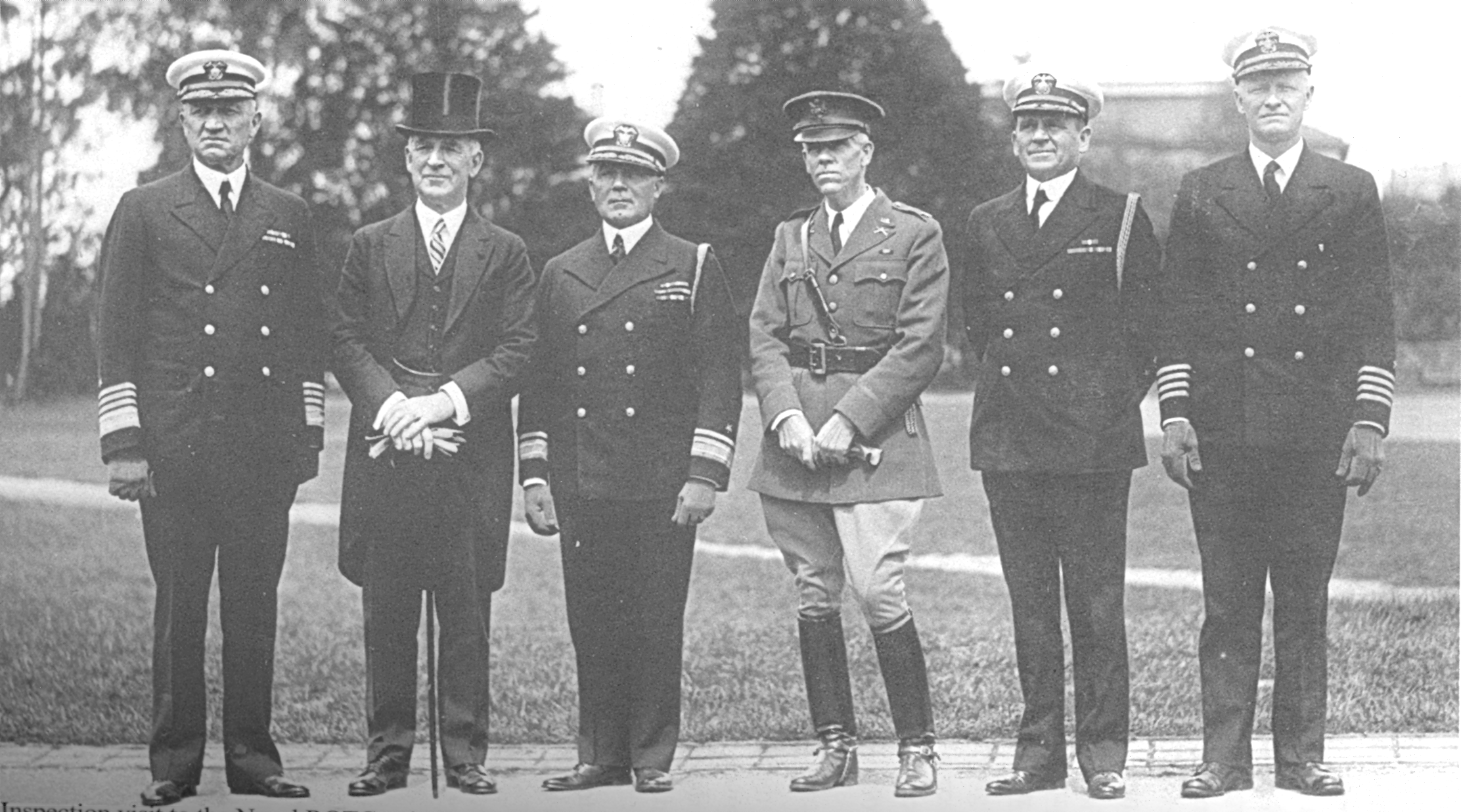
De Steiguer (far left) as Commander-in-Chief, Battle Fleet, on an inspection tour of the Naval Reserve Officers Training Corps Unit at the University of California, Berkeley, in 1927. Captain Chester W. Nimitz, USN, is at extreme right.

De Steiguer was awarded the Distinguished Service Medal for his World War I service as chief of staff of the Third Naval District and as commanding officer of Arkansas. The oceanographic research ship USNS De Steiguer is named for him. He became a member of the Ohio University chapter of Phi Delta Theta in 1887.

De Steiguer was a legendary disciplinarian and martinet. His flag secretary, future four-star admiral and chief of naval operations Robert B. Carney, described de Steiguer as a tremendously ambitious man with a "lousy disposition". Captains of other ships in the division would consult Carney to gauge de Steiguer's mood before approaching him. Carney recalled his own association with de Steiguer as fraught with "constant pressure, irascibility, criticism, and unpleasantness". Carney eventually marched into de Steiguer's cabin, snapped, "Admiral, I just want to tell you I think you are a goddamn rotten son of a bitch," and stormed out. After failing to retrieve Carney via Marine orderly, de Steiguer visited Carney's cabin in person, said, "Sonny, you've been working too hard. You and I are going ashore," and took Carney on an epic drinking binge. Carney ultimately concluded that his three years with de Steiguer had been a valuable experience, but not one he would have chosen to repeat.

De Steiguer died in Washington, D.C., on April 20, 1947. He is buried in Arlington National Cemetery with his wife, the former Katharine Constable. They had no children. His funeral instructions made two requests of his former flag secretary: that Carney lead the funeral cortege, and that he have de Steiguer buried with his hindquarters facing the Pentagon. Carney honored both requests.

== Dates of rank ==
- Midshipman – March 17, 1885
- Passed Midshipman – 1889
- Ensign – July 1, 1891
- Lieutenant (junior grade) – November 22, 1898
- Lieutenant – March 3, 1899
- Lieutenant-Commander – July 1, 1905
- Commander –
- Captain –
- Rear Admiral –
- Vice Admiral – summer 1926
- Admiral – September 10, 1927

Military offices
Preceded by Richard H. Jackson	Commander in Chief, Battle Fleet, United States Fleet; September 10, 1927 – June 26, 1928	Succeeded by William V. Pratt
