= Battle Fleet =

Part of the U.S. Navy from 1922 to 1941

The United States Battle Fleet or Battle Force was part of the organization of the United States Navy from 1922 to 1941. It served as the Pacific fleet and included most of the Navy, including its most modern ships and all of its aircraft carriers.

== Organization ==
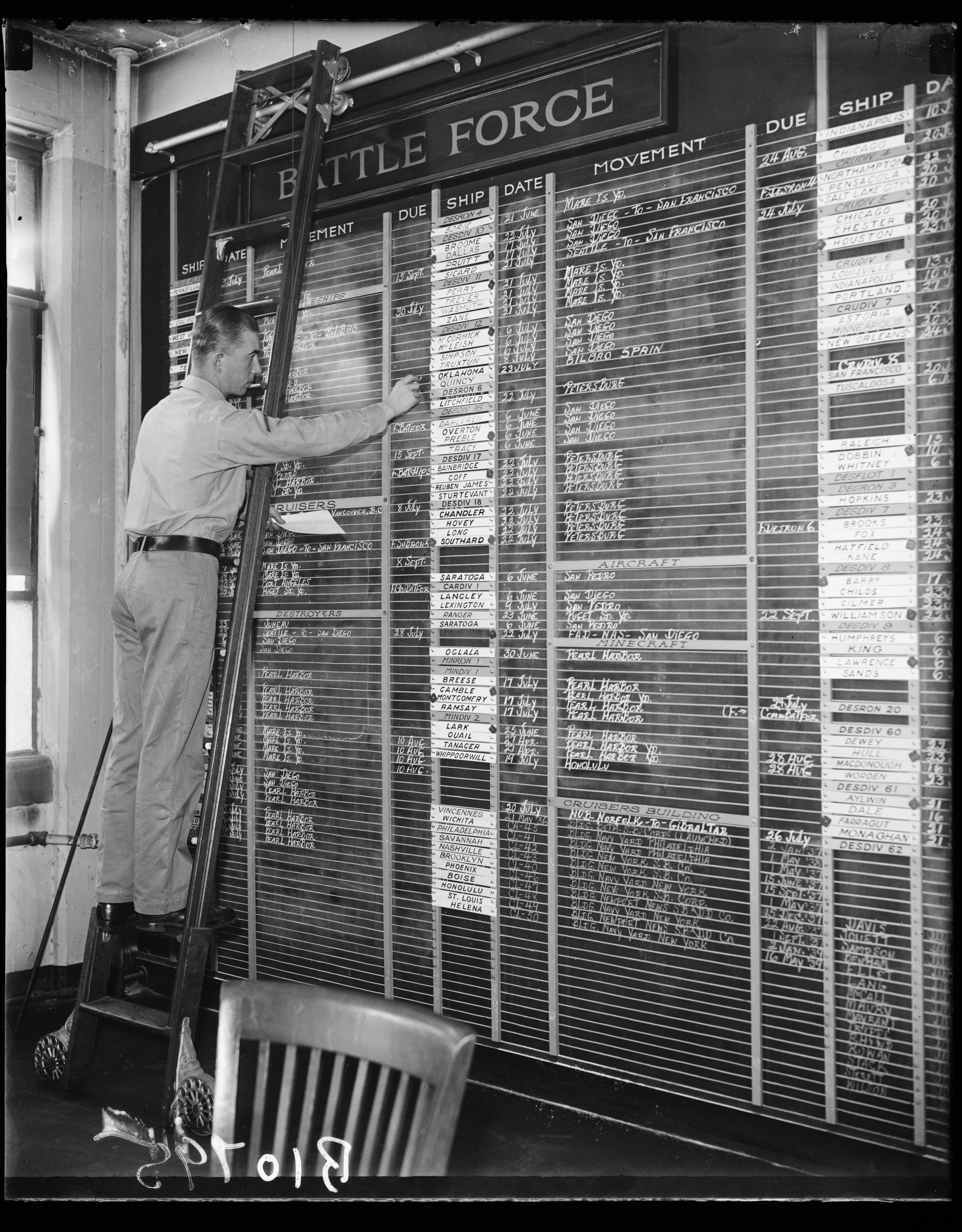
Battle Force wall with ship information, 1936

The General Order of 6 December 1922 organized the United States Fleet, with the Battle Fleet as the Pacific presence. This fleet comprised the main body of ships in the Navy, with the smaller Scouting Fleet as the Atlantic presence. Most battleships, including the most modern ones, and new aircraft carriers were assigned to the Battle Fleet. On 1 September 1923, the Battle Fleet was under the command of Admiral Samuel S. Robison. Battleships, Battle Fleet was under the command of Vice Admiral Henry A. Wiley, with his flag aboard New Mexico (BB-40). Battleship Division Three, under Rear Admiral Louis M. Nulton, consisted of New York (BB-34) (F), Texas (BB-35) under Captain A. M. Proctor, Oklahoma (BB-37) under Captain W. F. Scott, and California (BB-44) under Captain H. H. Christy, which was also the Battle Fleet flagship. Battleship Division Four, under Rear Admiral William Veazie Pratt, comprised Arizona (BB-39) (F), under Captain J. R. Y. Blakely, Nevada (BB-36), Mississippi (BB-41), and Pennsylvania (BB-38). Battleship Division Five under Vice Admiral Wiley himself comprised New Mexico (BB-40), Idaho (BB-42), Tennessee (BB-43), and Maryland (BB-46). Aircraft Squadrons, Battle Fleet, under Captain A. W. Marshall, comprised Aroostook (CM-3) (F), Langley (CV-1), and the tender Gannet (AM-41). Destroyer Squadrons, Battle Fleet, under Rear Admiral Sumner E. W. Kittelle, comprised Destroyer Squadron 11 and Destroyer Squadron 12. Submarine Divisions, Pacific, was under Captain A. Bronson, Jr.

In 1930, the name of the fleet was changed to "Battle Force", but the structure remained the same. In 1931, the force was based in Pearl Harbor and consisted of a majority of the United States' surface fleet: all of the newer battleships, all of the carriers, a light cruiser squadron and "three or four" destroyer squadrons were all a part of the Battle Force. In 1939, the Battle Force had five aircraft carriers, 12 battleships, 14 light cruisers, and 68 destroyers.

On 1 February 1941, General Order 143 reorganized the United States Fleet with three separate fleets, the United States Atlantic Fleet, the United States Pacific Fleet and the Asiatic Fleet.

== Commander in Chief, Battle Fleet (COMBATFLT) ==
| Date | Incumbent |
|---|---|
| 5 July 1921 - 30 June 1923 | Admiral Edward W. Eberle |
| 30 June 1923 - 14 October 1925 | Admiral Samuel S. Robison |
| 14 October 1925 - 4 September 1926 | Admiral Charles F. Hughes |
| 4 September 1926 - 10 September 1927 | Admiral Richard H. Jackson |
| 10 September 1927 - 26 June 1928 | Admiral Louis R. de Steiguer |
| 26 June 1928 - 21 May 1929 | Admiral William V. Pratt |
| 21 May 1929 - 24 May 1930 | Admiral Louis M. Nulton |
| 24 May 1930 - 1 April 1931 | Admiral Frank H. Schofield |

== Commander Battle Force (COMBATFOR) ==
| Date | Incumbent |
|---|---|
| 1 April 1931 - 15 September 1931 | Admiral Frank H. Schofield |
| 15 September 1931 - 11 August 1932 | Admiral Richard H. Leigh |
| 11 August 1932 - 20 May 1933 | Admiral Luke McNamee |
| 20 May 1933 - 1 July 1933 | Admiral William H. Standley |
| 1 July 1933 - 15 June 1934 | Admiral Joseph M. Reeves |
| 15 June 1934 - 1 April 1935 | Admiral Frank H. Brumby |
| 1 April 1935 - 30 March 1936 | Admiral Harris Laning |
| 30 March 1936 - 31 December 1936 | Admiral William D. Leahy |
| 2 January 1937 - 29 January 1938 | Admiral Claude C. Bloch |
| 29 January 1938 - 24 June 1939 | Admiral Edward C. Kalbfus |
| 24 June 1939 - 6 January 1940 | Admiral James O. Richardson |
| 6 January 1940 - 31 January 1941 | Admiral Charles P. Snyder |
| 31 January 1941 - 20 September 1942 | Vice Admiral William S. Pye |

== Bibliography ==
- Morison, Samuel Eliot (1948). Volume III, The Rising Sun in the Pacific. Boston and Toronto: Little, Brown and Company.
