= Louis McCoy Nulton =

United States Navy admiral

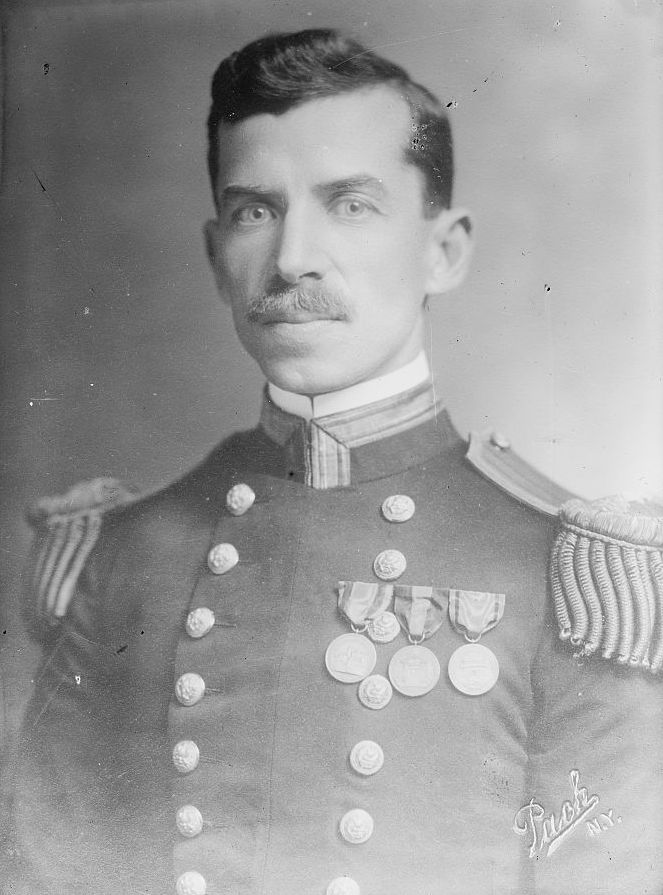
- Nulton, c. 1910–1915
- Born: August 8, 1869; Winchester, Virginia, U.S.
- Died: November 10, 1954 (aged 85); Maysville, Kentucky, U.S.
- Military career
- Allegiance: United States of America
- Branch: United States Navy
- Service years: 1889–1933
- Rank: Admiral
- Commands: Battle Fleet
- Conflicts: Spanish–American War; World War I
- Awards: Navy Cross

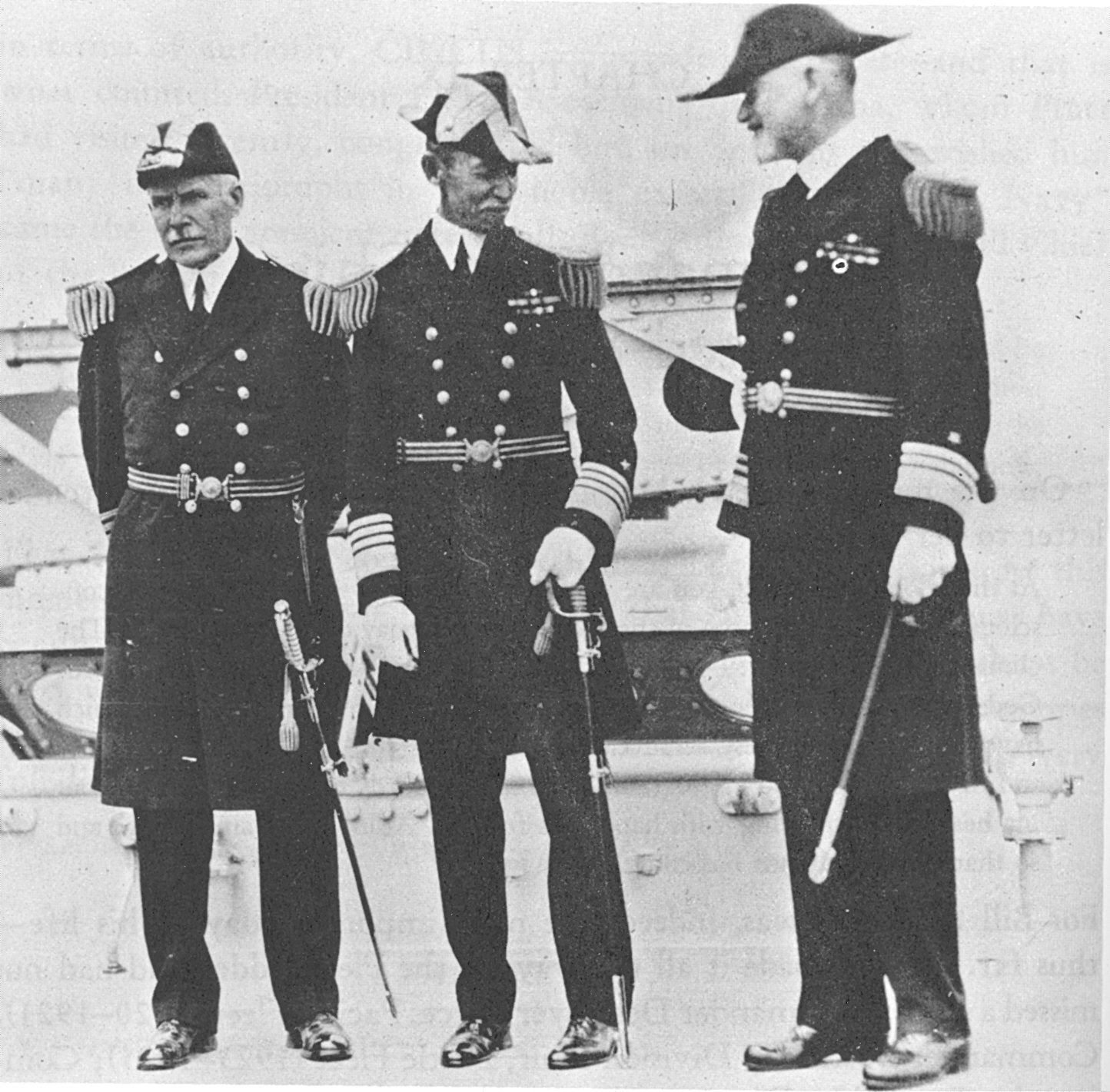
Nulton as Commander of Battle Fleet (center), May 21, 1929

Louis McCoy Nulton (August 8, 1869 – November 10, 1954) was a four-star admiral in the United States Navy who was superintendent of the U.S. Naval Academy from 1925 to 1928 and commander of the Battle Fleet from 1929 to 1930.

== Early career ==
He was born in Winchester, Virginia to Annie Clark and Colonel Joseph Nulton, a prominent Virginian who commanded Confederate troops during the American Civil War and subsequently commanded for many years the Old Second Virginia Regiment, National Guard. Appointed to the U.S. Naval Academy in 1885 at the age of 16, he graduated seventh in the class of 1889 and served his initial sea duty as a passed cadet aboard the protected cruiser Chicago.

His early assignments included service aboard the battleship Texas, followed by duty as executive officer of the auxiliary cruiser Panther, as ordnance officer of the battleship Ohio, and as executive officer of the battleship Wisconsin. He served two tours as an instructor at the U.S. Naval Academy and a third tour as commandant of midshipmen, and compiled one of the technical dictionaries used at the Academy.

His first command was the gunboat Nashville in 1913, followed by the armored cruiser Montana. In 1914, while commanding Montana, he led landing parties ashore during the United States occupation of Veracruz. In 1918 he was given command of the Atlantic Fleet battleship Pennsylvania, and served as Pennsylvania's captain when it escorted President Woodrow Wilson to and from the Paris Peace Conference.

== Flag officer ==
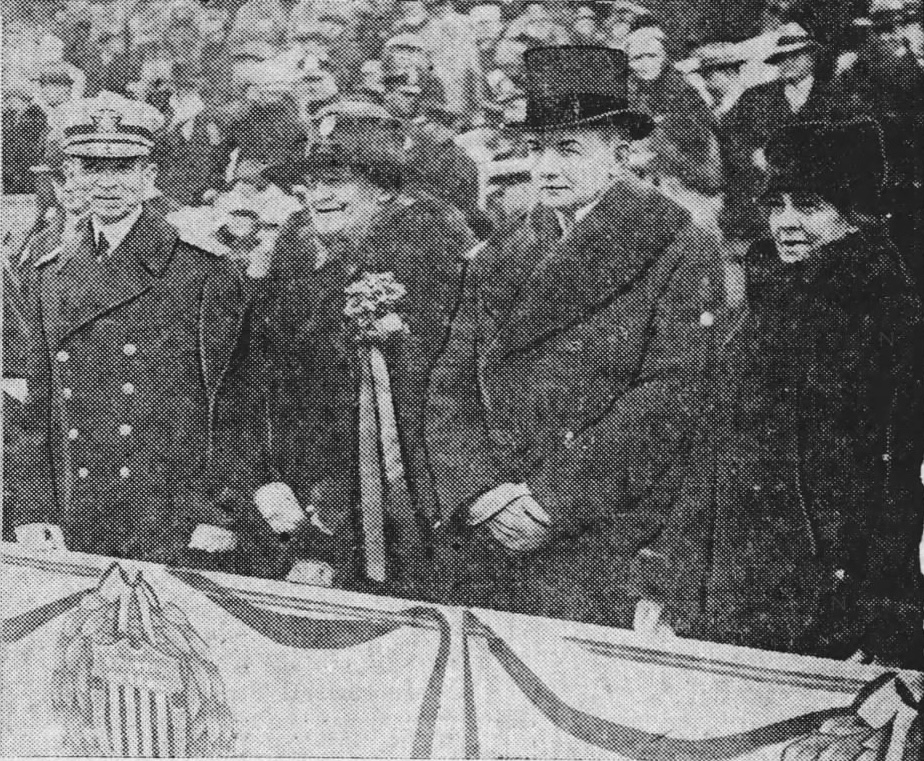
L–R: Nulton and his wife stand beside Vice President Charles G. Dawes and Second Lady Caro Dawes at the 1926 Army–Navy Game

He became commandant of the Philadelphia Navy Yard on September 22, 1920 and was promoted to rear admiral the following year. In late 1921, he unsuccessfully tried to save the partially completed battlecruiser Constitution from being scrapped by accelerating its construction schedule using funds he had illegally transferred from the construction and repair of other vessels, and by lobbying for Constitution's conversion into an aircraft carrier.

He was sent to sea in 1923 as commander of Battleship Division Three (New York, Texas, Oklahoma, Nevada). He was superintendent of the U.S. Naval Academy from February 1925 to June 1928. In spring 1928, he was again ordered to sea as Commander Battleship Divisions, Battle Fleet (COMBATDIVS), with the temporary rank of vice admiral, flying his three-star flag aboard the battleship West Virginia from June 26, 1928, to May 20, 1929.

He was promoted to the temporary rank of full admiral as Commander Battle Fleet (COMBATFLT) on May 21, 1929, succeeding Admiral William V. Pratt, who had been elevated to Commander in Chief, United States Fleet (CINCUS). As COMBATFLT, Nulton was the second most senior officer afloat, and selected the battleship California as his new flagship as a compliment to that state. On January 9, 1930, Pratt sailed from New York as a delegate to the London Naval Conference 1930, leaving Nulton to act in his stead from the date of Pratt's departure until his return in May 1930. As acting CINCUS, Nulton commanded the combined fleets during the winter maneuvers in the Caribbean. Relieved by Admiral Frank H. Schofield on May 24, 1930, Nulton reverted to his permanent rank of rear admiral and was assigned as commandant of the First Naval District. He retired from the Navy on September 1, 1933, upon reaching the statutory retirement age.

== Personal life ==
He married the former Minnie Clark Evans on September 5, 1895, and they had two daughters. In retirement, he and his wife resided in Winchester, Virginia from 1933 to 1946. He died on November 11, 1954, at his home in Maysville, Kentucky, and was buried in the U.S. Naval Academy Cemetery in Annapolis, Maryland.

His decorations include the Navy Cross, awarded for exceptionally meritorious service as commandant of midshipmen at the U.S. Naval Academy and later as commanding officer of Pennsylvania. As commander of the battleship divisions of the Pacific Fleet in 1929, he was commended in a letter from President Herbert Hoover for "attain[ing] the highest merit in battle efficiency of any division of its class." A collection of Nulton family genealogical material and memorabilia from Nulton's naval career is archived at the Handley Regional Library in Winchester, Virginia.

Military offices
Preceded by William V. Pratt	Commander in Chief, Battle Fleet; May 21, 1929–May 24, 1930	Succeeded by Frank H. Schofield
