= Richard H. Jackson =

United States admiral (1866–1971)

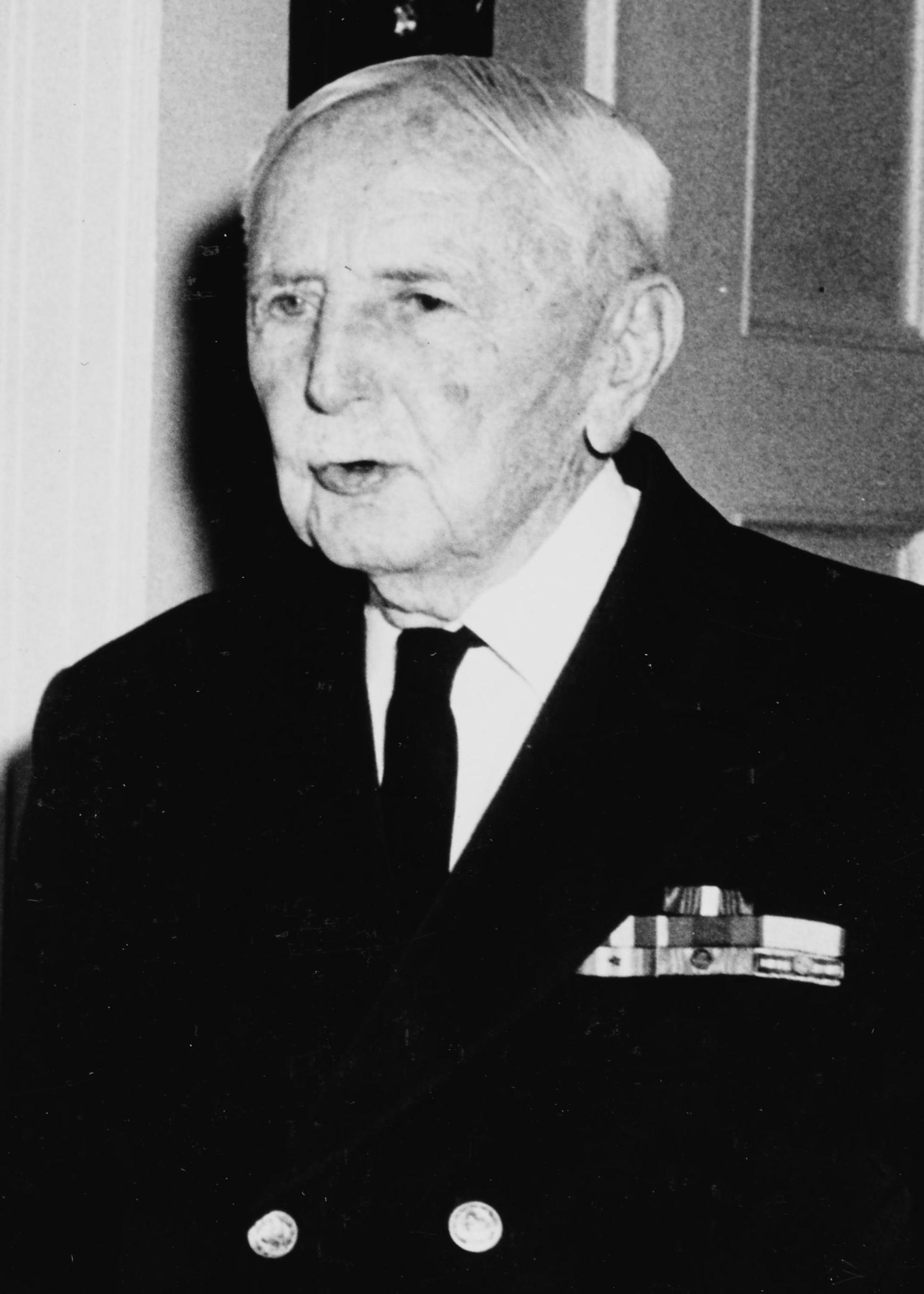
- Admiral Richard H. Jackson in 1968
- Born: May 10, 1866; Florence, Alabama, U.S.
- Died: October 2, 1971 (aged 105); San Diego, California, U.S.
- Military career
- Allegiance: United States of America
- Branch: United States Navy
- Service years: 1887–1889, 1890–1930
- Rank: Admiral
- Commands: Battle Fleet
- Conflicts: Spanish–American War; World War I
- Awards: Navy Cross

Richard Harrison Jackson (May 10, 1866 – October 2, 1971) was a four-star admiral in the United States Navy. Originally cashiered from the Navy for poor grades at the U.S. Naval Academy, he was commissioned ensign by special act of Congress for his heroism during the 1889 Apia cyclone. He served as commander in chief of the Battle Fleet in 1926 and lived to be 105 years old.

== Early life ==
He was born on a plantation near Tuscumbia, Alabama, the youngest of seven children of George Moore Jackson and Sarah Cabell Perkins, and was appointed by Alabama Congressman Joseph Wheeler to the U.S. Naval Academy, which he entered on June 4, 1883.

Jackson graduated from the Academy in 1887 and was immediately sent to sea as a passed cadet, first aboard the protected cruiser Boston, then aboard the wooden-hulled screw steamer Trenton. In those days, Academy graduates were required to complete two years of satisfactory sea duty before being awarded an ensign's commission. However, due to an 1882 statute limiting the number of available naval commissions, there were not enough vacancies in the service to retain all of the Academy's graduates. Jackson's poor grades placed him near the bottom of his graduating class, so he was to be cashiered from the Navy upon completing his sea duty.

While awaiting his discharge, Jackson was serving aboard Trenton in Samoa when it was wrecked by the 1889 Apia cyclone on March 16, 1889. As the ship had been caught with no steam in its boilers, crewmen were ordered to form a line along the deck and spread their coats to form a makeshift sail. Jackson led a group of sailors into the rigging where they spread their coats to increase the sail area, at significant hazard to their lives. This desperate measure successfully propelled Trenton out of danger long enough to help rescue the ship's company of the similarly wrecked Vandalia, before both crews were compelled to abandon ship.

On returning to the Naval Academy, Jackson passed his final examinations but fell just below the grade cutoff and was second on the list of cadets denied a commission and honorably discharged. In the hopes of becoming a naval surgeon, he and several of his Academy classmates studied medicine at the University of Virginia, where Jackson was a member of Beta Theta Pi and graduated fourth in the medical class of 1890. Meanwhile, word of Jackson's heroics at Apia had reached Congress, which was spurred to act by testimonials from Trenton's commanding officer, Captain Norman von Heldreich Farquhar, and Secretary of the Navy Benjamin F. Tracy.

On September 26, 1890, Congress passed special legislation authorizing the President to appoint one additional ensign in the United States Navy. The final statute noted that Jackson had behaved "with conspicuous gallantry by leading the men into the mizzen rigging to form a sail, when this position in the rigging was one of great danger, as the mast was liable to be carried away and fall overboard when the ship struck, and did thereby contribute largely to the success of the maneuver which the captain of the Trenton, in his official report to the admiral, says saved the lives of four hundred men from certain destruction." Congressman Wheeler, Jackson's original Academy sponsor, declared more extravagantly, "England would have knighted this young man."

== Naval career ==
Having received his commission, Jackson served as assistant inspector of ordnance and then inspector of ordnance at the Midvale Steel Works, then drew sea duty aboard the torpedo boat Cushing and monitor Puritan. In 1897, he married the daughter of Rear Admiral William T. Sampson, who would achieve fame a year later at the Battle of Santiago Bay. He won the annual essay contest administered by the United States Naval Institute in 1900.

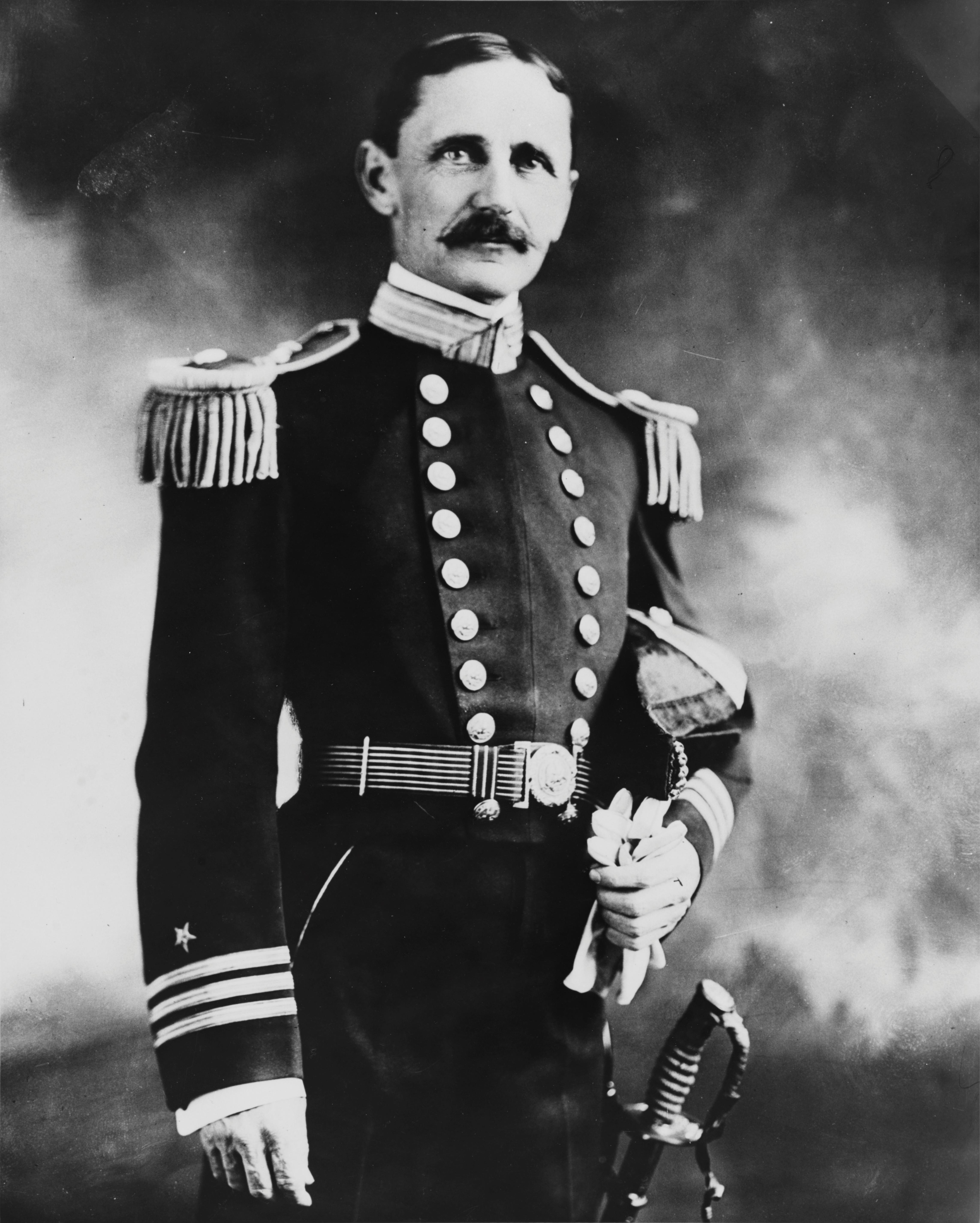
Portrait of Commander Richard H. Jackson, circa 1910

He served aboard the torpedo boat Foote during the Spanish–American War, followed by duty aboard the torpedo boat Gwin and three years with the gunboat Nashville. In 1903 he returned to the Naval Academy as an instructor in the Department of English and Law, concluding his tour in 1905 by commanding the protected cruiser Atlanta during midshipman training missions. He was navigator of the armored cruiser Colorado from 1905 to 1907 and executive officer from 1907 to 1908. From 1908 to 1910, he was in charge of the Naval Proving Ground at Indian Head, Maryland.

In 1910 he sailed to the Far East for shore duty at Naval Station Cavite. In 1911 he went to sea as commanding officer of the protected cruiser USS Albany, then as commanding officer of the gunboat Helena, in which role he also served as senior officer in command of the gunboats of the Yangtze River Patrol during the 1911 Revolution. He returned to the United States in 1912 for another tour at the Naval Academy, followed by duty with the General Board from 1913 to 1915 and command of the battleship Virginia in 1915.

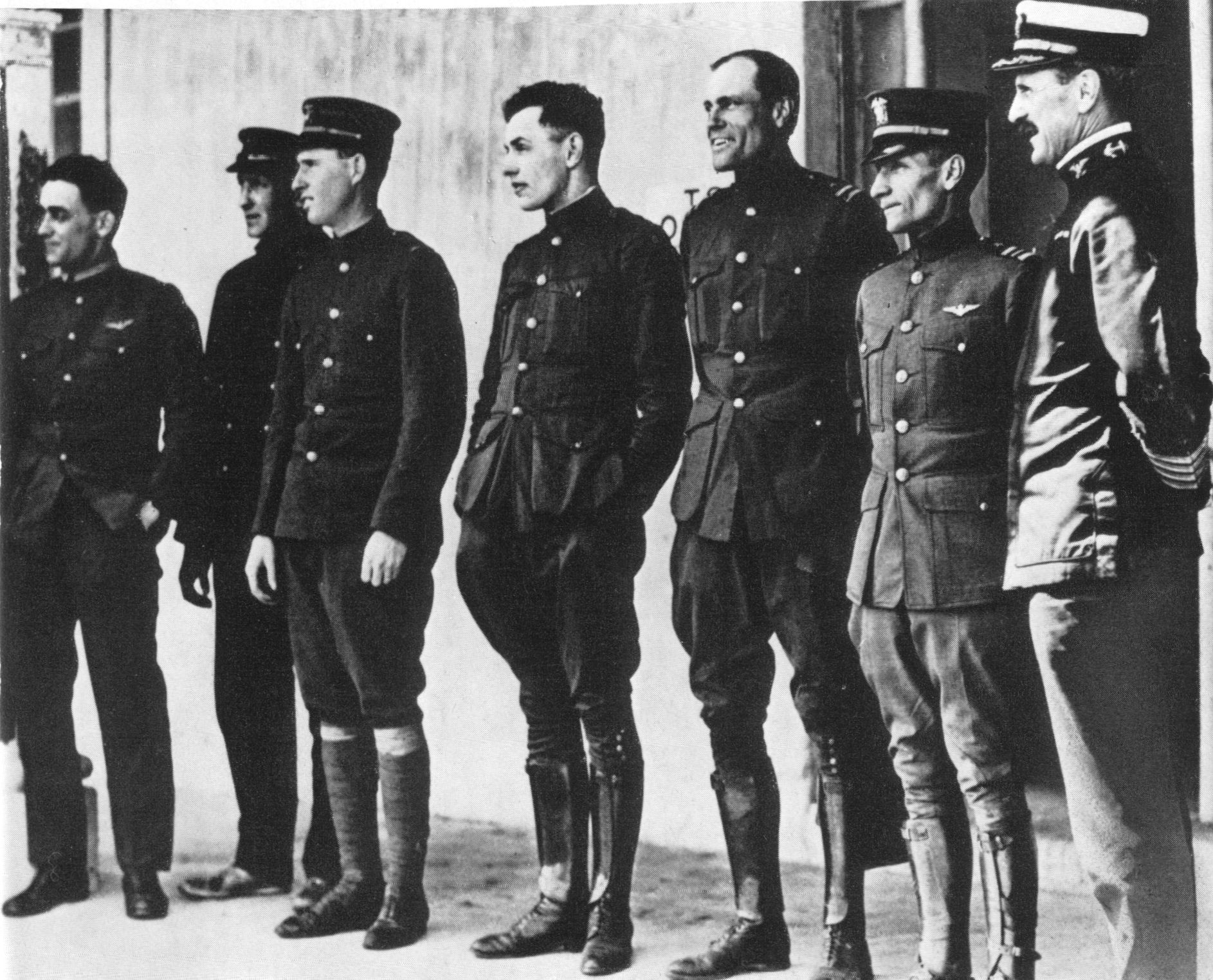
Captain Richard H. Jackson (far right), with crewmembers of the first trans-Atlantic flight, 1919

In June 1917, following the United States entry into World War I, he was dispatched to Paris as special representative from the Navy Department to the French Ministry of Marine, then served as naval attaché in Paris until after the Armistice in November 1918, when he returned to the United States to report to the Office of Naval Intelligence. In 1919, as senior officer for the U.S. Naval Forces in the British Imperial fortress colony of Bermuda, 640 miles off North Carolina (and the home base of the Royal Navy's America and West Indies Station), where the British Government had permitted the United States Navy to establish a base to support submarines, submarine chasers, and other smaller vessels crossing the Atlantic, he commanded the Azores detachment of the Atlantic Fleet that stood guard for the Navy flying boat NC-4 on its historic first trans-Atlantic crossing by an aircraft.

== Flag officer ==
Promoted to rear admiral in 1921, he served as a member of the General Board before being sent to sea in 1922 as commander of Battleship Division Three, Battleship Divisions, Battle Fleet. He was assistant chief of naval operations from 1923 to 1925.

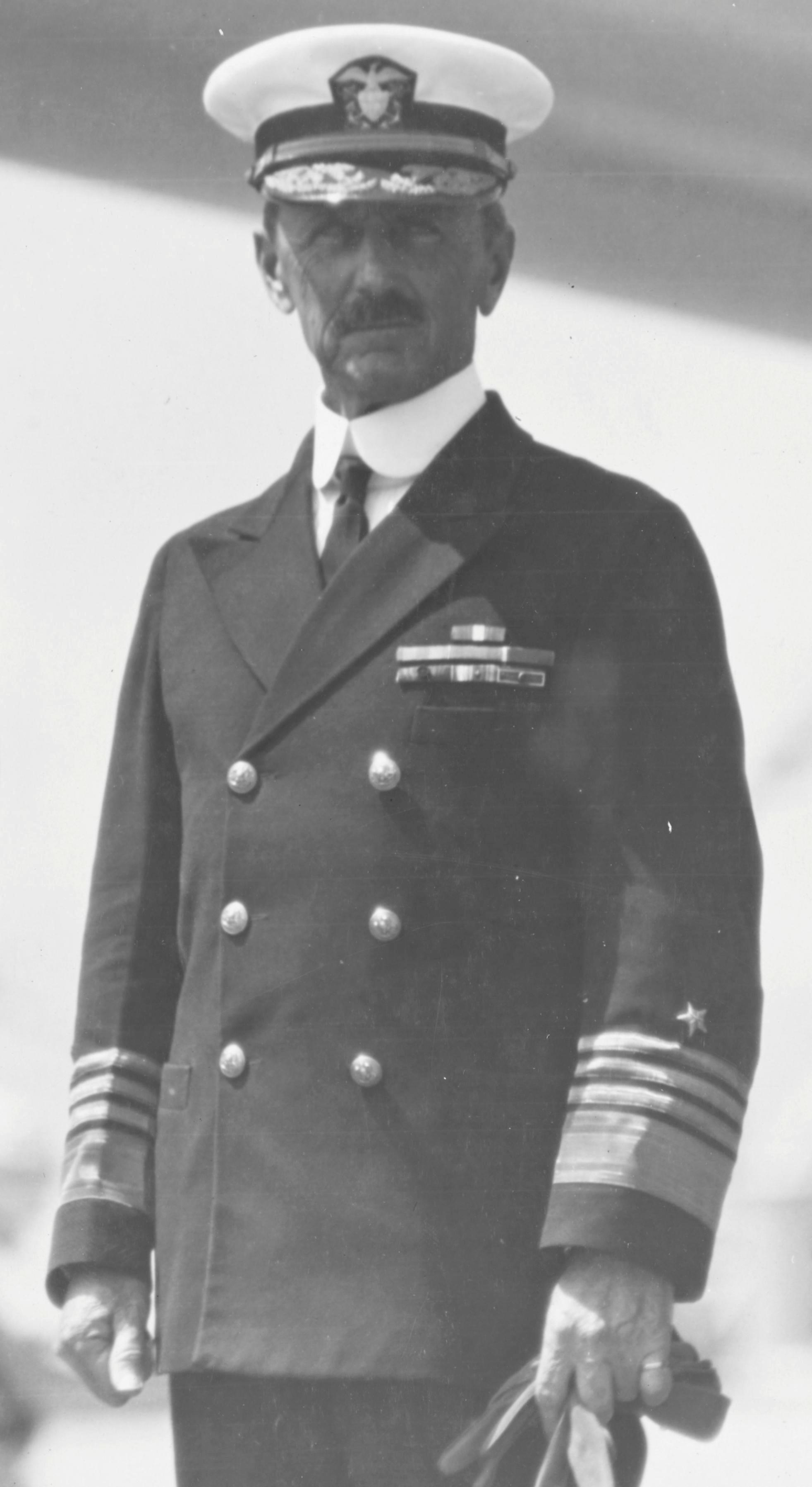
Battle Fleet commander Admiral Richard H. Jackson

On October 5, 1925, he was promoted to the temporary rank of vice admiral as Commander Battleship Divisions, Battle Fleet. The following year, he "fleeted up" to Commander in Chief, Battle Fleet, relieving Admiral Charles F. Hughes on September 4, 1926 and advancing to the temporary rank of full admiral. His tour as Battle Fleet commander was marked by innovations in naval air tactics, including the invention of divebombing, under Jackson's subordinate, Captain Joseph M. Reeves, commanding officer of the aircraft carrier Langley; and by Fleet Problem VII, the annual fleet exercise, whose highlight was Langley's successful air raid on the Panama Canal.

Completing his tour as Battle Fleet commander on September 10, 1927, Jackson was relieved by Admiral Louis R. de Steiguer and reverted to his permanent rank of rear admiral and shore duty as a member of the General Board. In December, he was appointed to head the court of inquiry into the sinking of the submarine S-4. He remained on the General Board until he retired in 1930 upon reaching the statutory age of 64.

In retirement, Jackson resided in Pearl City, Hawaii, where, on December 7, 1941, he observed the Japanese attack on Pearl Harbor from his front doorstep. His eyewitness account was enclosed in the official after action report sent to the Navy Department by Admiral Chester W. Nimitz on February 15, 1942. In July 1942, Jackson was advanced to admiral on the retired list by a new law that allowed each officer to retire in the highest rank in which he had served.

At a Navy League luncheon (center), with Adm. Robert L. Dennison, Adm. William H. Standley, Gen. Holland M. Smith, and Fleet Adm. Chester W. Nimitz, 1963

== Personal life ==
He married the former Catherine Sampson in 1897; she died in 1924. After her death, his niece, Elizabeth Hogun Jackson, served as hostess for him in Washington, DC. In 1933, he would present her in marriage to Henry T. Elrod.

Toward the end of his life, he lived in a two-story house across from a golf course in Coronado, California, attended by an aide and housekeeper. He died of cardiac failure while being treated for a hip fracture at Balboa Naval Hospital in San Diego, California at the age of 105. At the time of his death, he was the oldest military officer in the United States.

He was a tenth-generation descendant of Pocahontas and a third cousin of Air Force four-star general Charles P. Cabell.

His decorations include the Navy Cross, awarded for distinguished service as naval attaché and liaison officer in Paris during World War I, officer of the French Legion of Honour and grand officer of the Portuguese Military Order of Aviz.

In 1898, he took honorable mention in the annual essay contest administered by the United States Naval Institute. He won the top prize in 1900 with the topic of "Torpedo Craft, Types and Employment", earning a gold medal, life membership in the Naval Institute, and $100 in cash.

== External resources ==
- Famous Jackson
- Pearl Harbor Survivors Online: Admiral Jackson – The Old Gardener
- Richard H. Jackson Papers, 1802-1988 (bulk 1883-1971 MS 432 held by Special Collections & Archives, Nimitz Library at the United States Naval Academy
- "Admiral R.H. Jackson, U.S. Navy – The recent Commander-in-Chief of the U.S. Battle Fleet (portrait photograph)", United States Naval Institute Proceedings, vol. 53, no. 11, p. XLI, November 1927

Military offices
Preceded by Charles F. Hughes	Commander in Chief, Battle Fleet; September 4, 1926 – September 10, 1927	Succeeded by Louis R. de Steiguer
