= Richard H. Leigh =

American four-star Admiral (1870–1946)

Richard Henry Leigh
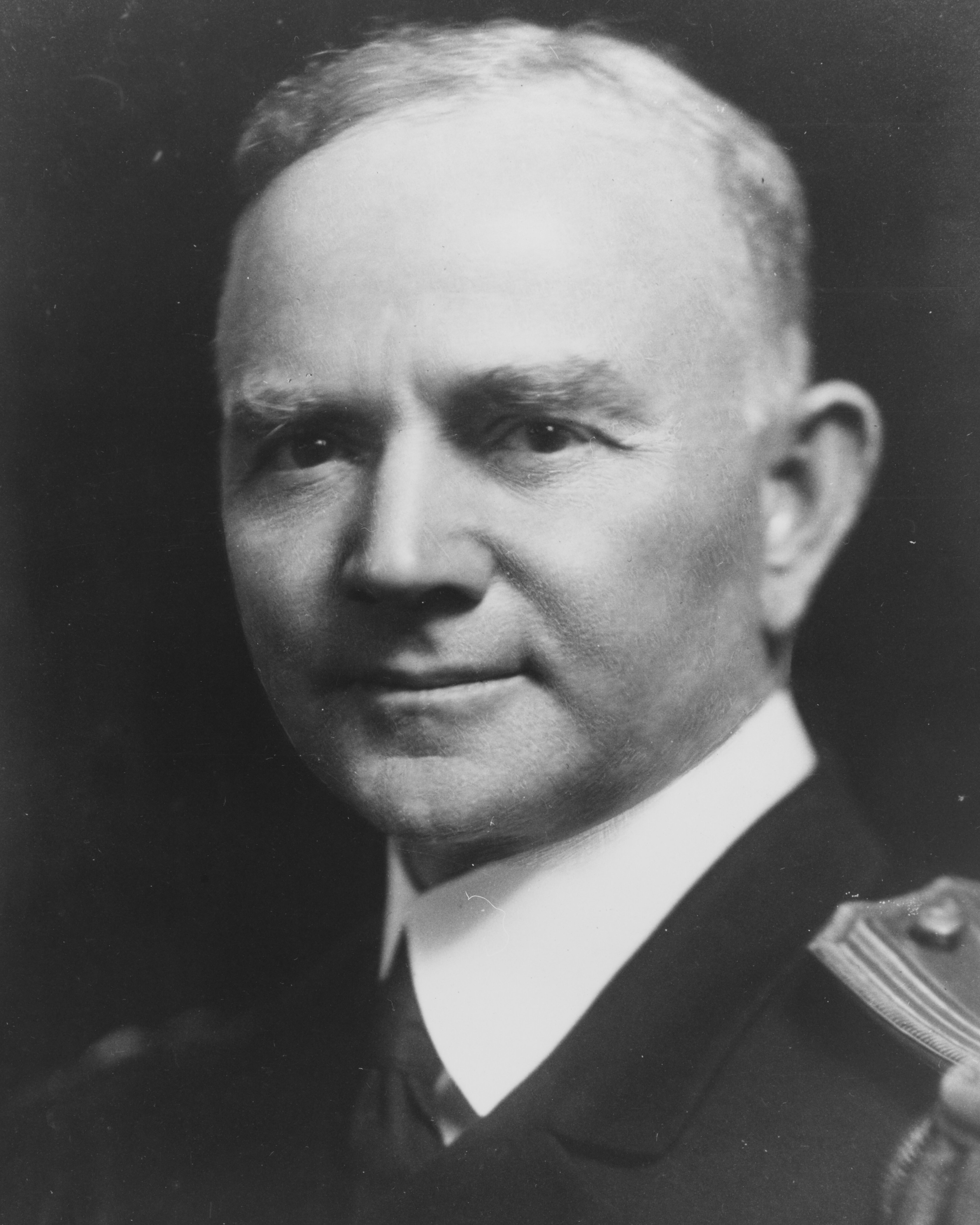
- Admiral Richard H. Leigh
- Born: Richard Henry Leigh; August 12, 1870; Batesville, Mississippi, U.S.
- Died: February 4, 1946 (aged 75); Long Beach, California, U.S.
- Military career
- Allegiance: United States
- Branch: United States Navy
- Service years: 1891–1934
- Rank: Admiral
- Commands: Navy General Board; United States Fleet; Battle Force; Bureau of Navigation
- Conflicts: Spanish–American War; Philippine–American War; Boxer Rebellion; World War I
- Awards: Navy Distinguished Service Medal; Order of the British Empire; Order of Leopold

Admiral Richard Henry Leigh CBE (August 12, 1870 – February 4, 1946) was a United States Navy officer who served during the late 19th and early 20th century. His service included active duty in the Spanish–American War, Philippine–American War, American Intervention in China, World War I, as well as numerous smaller actions in South America. His service during World War I led to the further development of hydrophone technology to hunt submarines. Following World War I Leigh rose to the rank of four-star admiral and served as Commander, Battle Force, U.S. Fleet (COMBATFOR) from 1931 to 1932 and as Commander in Chief, U.S. Fleet (CINCUS) from 1932 to 1933.

== Service history ==
=== 1891–1898 ===
On June 6, 1891, Richard H. Leigh received his first assignment and was ordered to the protected cruiser USS Chicago. Though this assignment was still considered part of his training at the United States Naval Academy, from which he had only recently graduated, it proved to be his first experience with the functions of the Navy on the seas as well as on land. At the time Chicago was assigned to the North Atlantic Squadron under Admiral John G. Walker as the squadron's flagship. During his service on Chicago Leigh patrolled Atlantic waters from Maine to the West Indies, Brazil, Uruguay and Argentina. On 11 April Leigh was ordered off Chicago and ordered to return to the United States Naval Academy at Annapolis, Maryland for final examination. On July 1 Leigh was bestowed the rank of ensign, number 186 on the active list. Leigh was subsequently ordered to USS New York, part of the South Atlantic Squadron. New York was soon dispatched to patrol the South Atlantic and to protect American interests in Brazil following the 1893 Brazilian Naval Mutiny. During his time on New York Leigh lamented at the ports and nations visited. He described the ports as "desolate revolution-ridden places." During his time on New York Leigh visited Rio de Janeiro, Colón, various Caribbean islands, and Bluefields, Nicaragua. New York was dispatched to many of these locations to protect American interests during uprisings across South and Central America in 1893. From New York Leigh was briefly transferred to USS Raleigh before being assigned to his first division officer station aboard the gunboat USS Bennington. His service on Bennington marked his first of many tours in the Pacific. On March 1, 1895, Leigh was ordered to his first of many scientific posts of his career. Aboard USS Albatross, a Department of Fisheries vessel, Leigh conducted deep sea fishing and other oceanographic experiments in the Bering Sea and North Pacific. Albatross traveled extensively across the North Pacific, visiting most of the Aleutian Islands, Japan, Russia, and the Kingdom of Hawaii. After his scientific cruise with Albatross Leigh was assigned to the Naval Academy as a gunnery instructor. During this time Leigh found teaching agreeable, but the outbreak of the Spanish–American War would bring an end to his academic teaching for the time being.

=== Spanish–American War ===
Leigh saw his first war sea patrol aboard the schooner USS Justin for collier duties under command of Commander George E. Ide. Justin performed collier and resupply duties around Chesapeake Bay before sailing for Cuba on June 2. However, before Justin was dispatched to the Caribbean Leigh was reassigned to the yacht USS Aileen for port protection duties in New York Harbor under command of Lieutenant William Kilburn. Aileen was charged with maintaining the minefields protecting New York. Leigh recalled that while this was not particularly exciting, he found it strenuous. After a month of duty in New York Harbor Leigh was transferred to the Caribbean aboard USS Princeton. While Princeton did patrol off the coast of Mexico and Central America. The patrol lasted until the end of hostilities without firing a shot in anger or intercepting a single enemy vessel. With the Caribbean no longer experiencing active hostilities, Princeton was reassigned to the Asiatic Fleet and completed a redeployment through the Suez Canal, across the Indian Ocean to Manila. Once in Manila Princeton once again redeployed, this time to China to service a cruise for the American Minister in Peking, Edwin H. Conger, completing a tour of coastal China.

=== Philippine–American War and Boxer Rebellion ===
At the start of the Philippine–American War Leigh was transferred to the captured Spanish gunboat Pampanga. Here Leigh experienced his first hostile action of his career. Pampanga acted in support of the United States Army providing resupply, naval fire support, and blockade duties in Lingayen Bay and Luzon. In one incident, Pampanga came under fire near San Jose de Buena Ventura receiving more than one hundred hits from small arms fire in a little under an hour. In March 1900 Leigh joined USS Oregon in its relief of international forces during the Boxer Rebellion. After the end of the Boxer Rebellion, Oregon was put into reserve status. Leigh was transferred to USS Brooklyn for the month of March before returning to Oregon to join the ship for her return voyage to the United States.

=== 1901–1917 ===
Leigh returned to teaching at the Naval Academy, becoming a mathematics instructor for both plebes and older students. After one year of teaching Leigh became an instructor on USS Chesapeake, a ship used for training midshipmen at the Naval Academy. In 1903 Leigh was assigned to the newly commissioned USS Cleveland as navigator before being replaced by a higher seniority lieutenant Leigh was quickly reassigned to the protected cruiser USS Des Moines again as a navigator. Des Moines sailed extensively in the North Atlantic, patrolling from the North Sea to the West Indies. At the behest of Admiral Bradford, Leigh was appointed as the navigator for Bradford's flagship, USS Minneapolis. Leigh completed Minneapolis' final cruise before being decommissioned. Again Leigh found himself in a teaching position, this time at the New York Naval Yards School of Electrical Engineering. In 1908 Leigh requested a transfer to be put in charge of the Navy's Nautical School and commander of the schoolship Newport. He was denied and returned to sea service aboard USS Washington. Washington made several cruises along the Pacific coast of South America before returning for refitting at the Portsmouth, New Hampshire Navy Yard in 1911. Leigh returned to shore duty, this time at the Secretary of the Navy's Office in Washington D.C. Again Leigh petitioned for a sea command, though this time he request was granted. In 1913 Leigh was granted his first sea command, the cruiser USS Galveston. After Galveston finished her outfitting in the Puget Sound Naval Yard she was ordered to join the Asiatic Fleet. Leigh transitioned well to his new role as captain of USS Galveston, receiving commendations from Secretary of the Navy Josephus Daniels. Upon inspection by Admiral Winterhalter Gavelston and her crew were found to be excellent and fit for any duty with few exceptions. Gunnery on Galveston was particularly impressive under Leigh, winning the Naval Gunnery Trophy every year under Leigh's command. This would prove to be Leigh's final sea command until the end of World War I as he was transferred to the Bureau of Steam Engineering effective September 1915.

=== World War I ===
With the American entrance into World War I in 1917 naval assets were deployed to European waters under Admiral Sims to counter German submarine raiders and surface threats. Leigh was sent along with several experimental listening devices, "K-tubes" and "c-tubes", designed to detect submarines. The United States Navy gave Leigh command over the 2nd, 3rd, 4th and 5th submarine chaser squadrons and charged with training then deploying the squadrons against German submarine raiders. In order to conduct his tests the British Admiralty loaned Leigh three British trawlers as well as a P-boat, an auxiliary sub-hunter meant to externally resemble a submarine. Though Leigh only conducted his tests for ten days in the English Channel his results were resounding. Not only did he show that the American listening devices were superior to anything employed by European navies, but that submarines could be located and hunted by hydrophones. British Naval engineers had been working with this problem since the beginnings of the war, yet Leigh proved the concept practical and revolutionized anti-submarine warfare. Leigh's success in the Atlantic motivated Admiral Sims to direct Leigh to establish an American naval base in the Mediterranean to operate submarine chaser squadrons. Leigh selected Govino Bay on Corfu for this task. A second base was constructed in Plymouth, and another in Queenstown. By the end of the war 142 American submarine chasers were operating out of these bases. Leigh's work with submarine chasers and development of anti-submarine warfare instrumentation and tactics was instrumental not only in the defeat of German on the seas, but in the advancement of anti-submarine warfare while in its infancy.

=== Later career ===
After the war Leigh was retained by Sims for his chief of staff until the withdrawal of the United States Navy in Europe in the Spring of 1919. For his help in defense of the United Kingdom, King George V made Leigh a Commander of the Order of the British Empire. He also received Order of Leopold by the King Albert I of Belgium. The Navy Department decorated Leigh with Navy Distinguished Service Medal.

Upon returning to the United States in March 1919, Leigh was ordered to Washington, D.C., where he was appointed Assistant Chief, Bureau of Navigation under Rear admiral Victor Blue. Due to the illness of admiral Blue, Leigh served as acting chief for five months before Rear admiral Thomas Washington arrived to take command. He then served at the Bureau of Navigation until June 1920, when he was given a command of newly commissioned dreadnought battleship USS Tennessee at Brooklyn Navy Yard. Leigh commanded the ship during the sea trials in Long Island Sound, which lasted from October 15 to 23, 1920. Tennessee under his command also won trophy for efficiency in naval gunnery.

Leigh returned to the Bureau of Navigation in June 1922 and served again as Assistant Chief until July 1924, when he was ordered for instruction to the Naval War College at Newport, Rhode Island. He graduated in June 1925 and was appointed Chief of Staff of the United States Fleet under Admiral Charles F. Hughes. For his new billet, Leigh was promoted to the rank of Rear admiral on June 4, 1925.

He was ordered to Washington, D.C. in February 1927 and appointed Chief of the Bureau of Navigation, the office where he served two times before. Leigh was now principally responsible for the personnel management of the United States Navy. He served in this capacity until May 1930, when was appointed Commander, Battleship, Battle Force.

Leigh was promoted to the temporary rank of four-star Admiral on September 15, 1931 and appointed Commander-in-Chief of the Battle Force stationed on Hawaii. After one year in this assignment, Leigh assumed command of United States Fleet, which combined the U.S. Pacific Fleet, U.S. Atlantic Fleet, Battle Fleet and Scouting Fleet under one command.

Admiral Leigh quickly responded when a major earthquake struck Long Beach, California and surrounding areas on March 10, 1933. He provided assistance to the city from US Naval vessels stationed in Long Beach harbor. Tents, food, doctors and medical supplies were delivered to neighborhoods struck by the temblor. By the next morning 2,000 sailors of the Pacific Fleet patrolled the streets, providing security and offering aid to stricken civilians. Civilian-military relations greatly improved as a result of Adm. Leigh's actions.

In June 1933, Leigh assumed his final duty as Chairman, Navy General Board, an advisory body of the United States Navy. He retired from the Navy with his permanent rank of Rear admiral on September 1, 1934 after 43 years of active service. Leigh was seriously ill with arthritis before the outbreak of the World War II and was not recalled for active duty.

The University of Southern California in Los Angeles awarded made Leigh made an honorary Doctor of Science in June 1933. Leigh was also active in the American Legion.

Admiral Leigh died on February 4, 1946, aged 75, in Long Beach, California and was buried with full military honors at Arlington National Cemetery, Virginia. He was posthumously promoted to the highest rank he held, Admiral.

== Decorations ==
Here is the ribbon bar of Admiral Leigh:

1st Row	Navy Distinguished Service Medal		Spanish Campaign Medal
2nd Row	Philippine Campaign Medal	China Relief Expedition Medal	Cuban Pacification Medal
3rd Row	World War I Victory Medal with one Battle Clasp	Commander of the Order of the British Empire	Belgian Order of Leopold, rank Officer

== See also ==
- United States Fleet

Military offices
Preceded by Frank Herman Schofield	Commander-in-Chief, United States Fleet; September 1932 – June 1933	Succeeded by David F. Sellers
Preceded by Frank Herman Schofield	Commander-in-Chief, Battle Force; September 15, 1931 - August 11, 1932	Succeeded by Luke McNamee
