= Jehu V. Chase =

Career navy officer

Jehu Valentine Chase
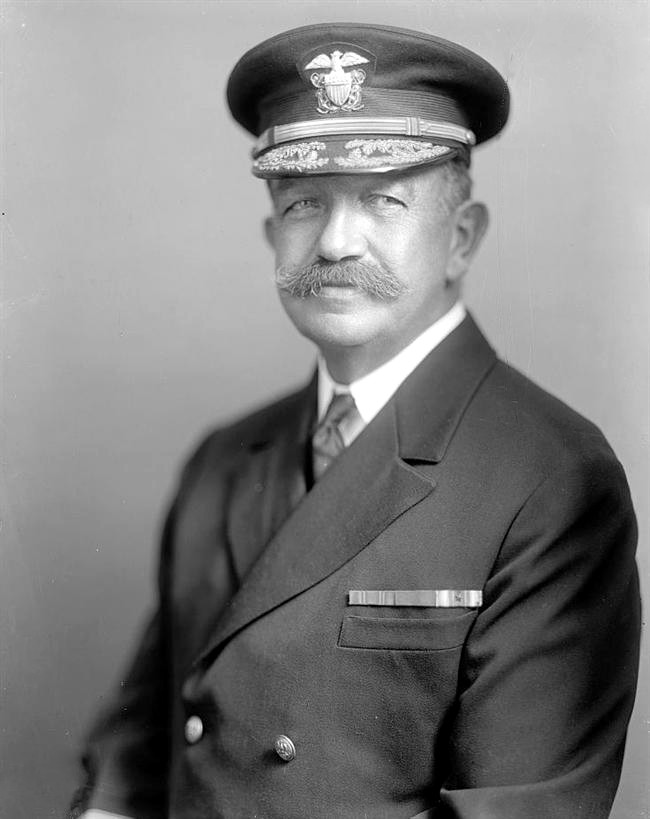
- Born: January 10, 1869; Pattersonville, Louisiana, U.S.
- Died: May 24, 1937 (aged 68); Coronado, California, U.S.
- Military career
- Allegiance: United States of America
- Branch: United States Navy
- Service years: 1890–1933
- Rank: Admiral
- Commands: United States Fleet; USS Minnesota (BB-22)
- Conflicts: World War I
- Awards: Navy Distinguished Service Medal

Admiral Jehu Valentine Chase (January 10, 1869 – May 24, 1937) was a career navy officer, who is most remembered for his leadership of USS Minnesota during World War I.

Chase was born in Pattersonville, Louisiana on 10 January 1869, and graduated from the United States Naval Academy 6 June 1890.

As commanding officer of the USS Minnesota when she was mined in September 1918, Chase was awarded the Navy Distinguished Service Medal in recognition of his seamanship and leadership in bringing his ship safely to port without loss of life.

Admiral Chase was Commander in Chief of the United States Fleet, from 17 September 1930 to 15 September 1931, and Chairman of the General Board from April 1932 until his retirement in February 1933. He died at Coronado, California on 24 May 1937.

== Family ==
Chase's father was Judge Valentine Chase of St. Mary Parish. Valentine Chase was an active Republican, and was murdered during Reconstruction on 17 October 1868 by a group of unidentified men possibly associated with the Knights of the White Camelia paramilitary organization.

Chase's father-in-law, Henry Clay Taylor, was also a Rear Admiral of the U.S. Navy, and many of Chase's descendants have also served as Navy leaders. His two sons, Jay Valentine Chase and Harry Taylor Chase, each commanded ships during World War II; his great-grandson James F. Caldwell Jr. rose to the rank of admiral and served as director of the Naval Nuclear Propulsion Program until his retirement in 2024.

Chase's grandson Griff Chase served as a police officer of the Compton Police Department in the 1960s. He later committed suicide by cop in Harbor City after injuring his back and becoming an alcoholic.

== Namesake ==
The USS Chase was named in Chase's honor.

== Decorations ==
Admiral Chase's decorations included: Navy Distinguished Service Medal, Navy Spanish Campaign Medal and World War I Victory Medal with Clasp.

Military offices
Preceded by William V. Pratt	Commander in Chief, United States Fleet; 17 September 1930 – 15 September 1931	Succeeded by Frank Herman Schofield
