= Samuel Robison =

United States admiral

Samuel Shelburne Robison
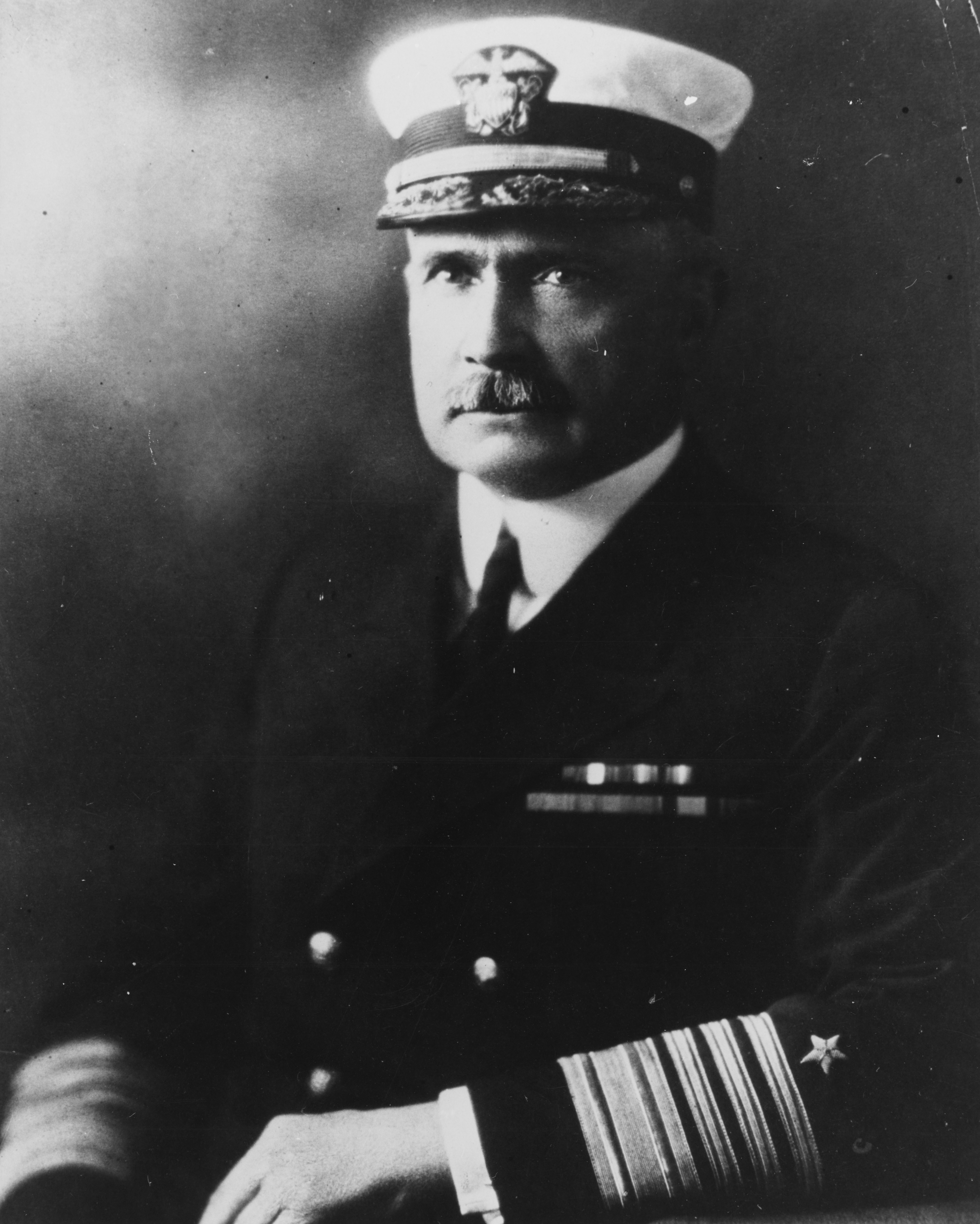
- Born: May 10, 1867; Juniata County, Pennsylvania, U.S.
- Died: November 20, 1952 (aged 85); Glendale, California, U.S.
- Relatives: Charles F. Hughes (brother-in-law)
- Military career
- Allegiance: United States
- Branch: United States Navy
- Service years: 1888–1931
- Rank: Admiral
- Commands: Superintendent, United States Naval Academy; U.S. Fleet; U.S. Battle Fleet; Boston Navy Yard; Military Governor, Dominican Republic
- Conflicts: Spanish-American War; World War I
- Awards: Navy Cross
- Other work: Superintendent, Admiral Farragut Academy

Admiral Samuel Shelburne Robison CB, USN (May 10, 1867 – November 20, 1952) was a United States Navy officer whose service extended from the 1890s through the early 1930s. He held several major commands during World War I, and from 1928 to 1931 served as Superintendent of the United States Naval Academy. In 1933, Admiral Robison also founded a Naval Preparatory Academy in Pine Beach, New Jersey called Admiral Farragut Academy.

== Early life and career ==
Robison was born on May 10, 1867, in Juniata County, Pennsylvania. He entered the United States Naval Academy on September 4, 1884. After finishing his academic studies at Annapolis he served the two years at sea as a passed naval cadet in USS Omaha on the Asiatic Station and was commissioned ensign July 1, 1890.

In 1891 he was transferred to USS Boston, still on the Asiatic Station; and, from 1893, he served in USS Thetis until ordered to the Mare Island Navy Yard in 1895. In 1896 he returned to the Asiatic Station in Boston. In August 1899 he was assigned to the League Island Navy Yard, Philadelphia, Pennsylvania. He joined Alabama (BB-8) September 15, 1900, and two years later was transferred to Hull (DD-7), a torpedo boat destroyer. From September 1904 to July 1906, he served with the Bureau of Equipment at Washington, D.C., then he returned to sea, serving first in Tennessee (CA-10) and later in Pennsylvania (ACR-4).

After a tour of duty in the Bureau of Engineering, he assumed command of Cincinnati (C-7), a unit of the Asiatic Fleet, on October 25, 1911. Upon his return to the United States in April 1914, he became commanding officer of USS Jupiter (AC-3). He held the rank of captain from July 1, 1914, and he remained with Jupiter until August 8.

== World War I service ==
On October 12, 1915, he assumed command of USS South Carolina (BB-26) and held that post until after the United States entered World War I. From July 1917 until September 1918, he commanded the Atlantic Submarine Force with additional duty as General Supervisor of all commissioned submarines in the Navy. For this duty he was awarded the Navy Cross. He was also made an Honorary Companion of the Order of the Bath for service to the British during the war.

In October 1918 he assumed command of Squadron 3, Patrol Force, and during the next month had additional duty as District Commander, Brest, France. In November, he was appointed U.S. Naval Representative on the Commission for executing the Naval Terms of the Armistice with Germany. After his return to the United States in March 1919, he commanded the Boston Navy Yard. In May 1921, he was sent to Santo Domingo as Military Governor, serving until October 1922, when Santo Domingo was turned back over to civilian control.

== Post-war service and retirement ==
A member of the General Board of the Navy from December 1922 until June 1923, he was appointed Commander in Chief, Battle Fleet, with the rank of admiral, from June 30, 1923. With USS Seattle (ACR-11) as his flagship, he commanded the United States Fleet during the year commencing August 1925. He then became Commandant of the 13th Naval District with the permanent rank of rear admiral. From June 16, 1928, until his retirement in June 1931, he served as Superintendent of the Naval Academy.

For a number of years after his retirement, Admiral Robison was Superintendent of the Admiral Farragut Academy, Toms River. He died in Glendale, California, on November 20, 1952.

== Publications ==
- A History of naval tactics from 1530-1930 : the evolution of tactical maxims, by Samuel Shelburne Robison and Mary Louise Robison, pub U.S. Naval Institute, 1942.
- Manual of wireless telegraphy for the use of naval electricians, by Samuel Shelburne Robison et al, pub United States Navy Department, Bureau of Equipment, 1906, 1909, 1911, 1915.

== See also ==
- List of superintendents of the United States Naval Academy

Academic offices
Preceded by Louis M. Nulton	Superintendent of United States Naval Academy; 1928–1931	Succeeded by Thomas C. Hart
Preceded by Robert E. Coontz	Commander in Chief, United States Fleet; 1925–1926	Succeeded by Charles F. Hughes
