= Joseph M. Reeves =

American four-star Admiral (1872-1948)

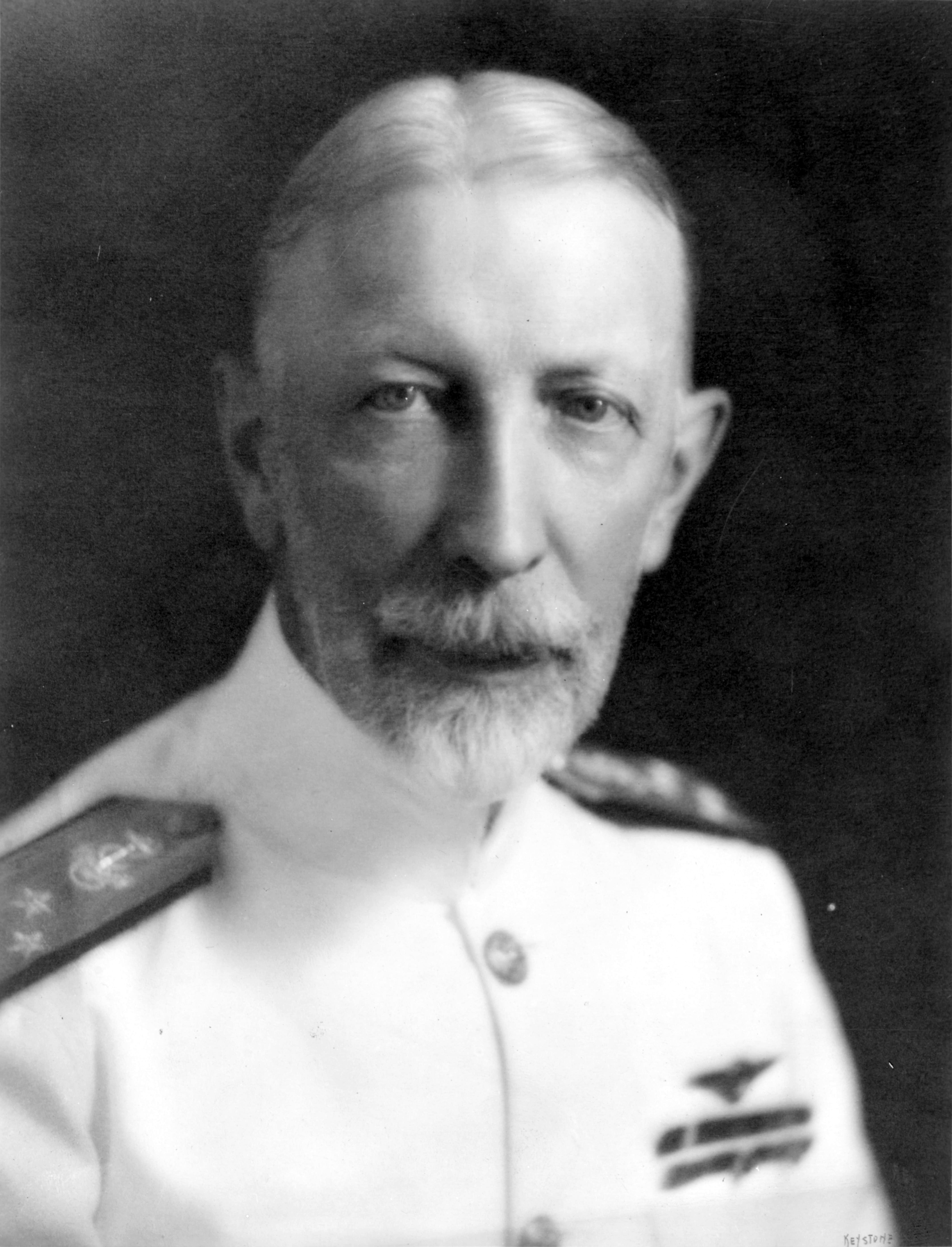
- Reeves in 1934
- Born: Joseph Mason Reeves; 20 November 1872; Tampico, Illinois, U.S.
- Died: 25 March 1948 (aged 75); Bethesda, Maryland, U.S.
- Burial place: United States Naval Academy Cemetery, Annapolis, Maryland
- Military career
- Allegiance: United States
- Branch: United States Navy
- Service years: 1894–1936; 1940–1947
- Rank: Admiral
- Nickname: "Bull"
- Commands: United States Fleet
- Conflicts: Spanish–American War; Battle of Santiago de Cuba; World War I; World War II
- Awards: Navy Cross; Distinguished Service Medal; Legion of Merit

Joe Reeves
Coaching career (HC unless noted)
- 1907: Navy

Head coaching record
- Overall: 9–2–1

Joseph Mason "Bull" Reeves (20 November 1872 – 25 March 1948) was an admiral in the United States Navy and an early supporter of U.S. Naval Aviation. Though a battleship officer during his early career, he became known as the "Father of Carrier Aviation" for his role in integrating aircraft carriers into the fleet as a major part of the U.S. Navy's attack capabilities.

Reeves retired in the mid-1930s but was recalled to active duty during World War II to serve in high-level staff positions within the Office of the United States Secretary of the Navy. He retired again in December 1946 with the rank of full admiral.

== Biography ==
=== Early life ===
Joseph Mason Reeves was born on 20 November 1872 in the village of Tampico, Illinois. He received an appointment in 1890 to attend the United States Naval Academy in Annapolis, Maryland, where he became an important football player. He is also credited with the invention of the modern football helmet, which he had a shoemaker create for him after being told by a U.S. Navy doctor that another kick to his head could result in "instant insanity" or death. Reeves graduated from the academy in June 1894.

=== Naval career ===
==== 1894–1902 ====
Upon graduation, Reeves was assigned to the protected cruiser USS San Francisco. After the then-mandatory two years at sea prior to being commissioned as an officer, he was commissioned with the rank of assistant engineer in 1896. In 1896 he was reassigned to the battleship USS Oregon in the Pacific Squadron. When the Spanish–American War broke out in April 1898, Oregon was at San Francisco, California, and Reeves was aboard her for her famous 66-day voyage from San Francisco and around Cape Horn to the Caribbean to join the North Atlantic Squadron for operations against the Spanish Navy. After arriving off Cuba, Reeves took part aboard Oregon in the blockade of Admiral Pascual Cervera y Topete's squadron at Santiago de Cuba in June and July 1898 and its culmination in the Battle of Santiago de Cuba on 3 July. For the latter action he was advanced four numbers in grade and commended "[f]or displaying ominous and conspicuous conduct in managing the machinery of the Vessel OREGON, July 3, 1898. [He] so developed the efficiency of the motive power as to cause the attainment of a speed unusual to the ship, thereby enabling her commanding officer to place her in the very conspicuous position that she occupied on that occasion, thus contributing in a very important degree to the success of the OREGON in the battle." The war ended in August 1898.

Reeves's "assistant engineer" rank was changed to ensign on 3 March 1899. He was promoted to lieutenant (junior grade) on 1 July 1899 and to lieutenant on 9 October 1901. During these years he left Oregon and subsequently served consecutively aboard the presidential yacht USS Sylph, the gunboat and dispatch vessel USS Dolphin, and the battleship USS Kearsarge until ordered to the Naval Torpedo Station at Newport, Rhode Island, for six weeks of instruction in torpedoes. He then had duty at the Washington Navy Yard in Washington, D.C., until September 1902.

==== 1902–1925 ====
After leaving the Washington Navy Yard in 1902, Reeves again served aboard San Francisco. In July 1904 he became aide on the staff of Commander-in-Chief, United States Asiatic Fleet, first under Admiral Yates Stirling aboard his flagship, the battleship USS Wisconsin, and then under Admiral Charles J. Train aboard his flagship, the battleship USS Ohio. Train died on 4 August 1906, and Reeves was detached that month and returned to the U.S. Naval Academy, where he was an instructor in the Department of Chemistry and Physics from 1906 to 1908. He served as the academy's head football coach in 1907, guiding the team to a 9–2–1 record and a 6–0 victory over Army.

In March 1908 Reeves became ordnance officer aboard the battleship USS New Hampshire. In September 1909 he began an assignment as fleet ordnance officer on the staff of the Commander-in-Chief, United States Atlantic Fleet, Admiral Seaton Schroeder, aboard Schroeder's flagship, the battleship USS Connecticut. He moved on in September 1910, one source claiming he began a tour as commanding officer of the Naval Coal Depot aat Tiburon, California, another that he first had an assignment to the Board of Inspection and Survey before assuming duty at Tiburon.

In April 1913, Reeves assumed command of the collier USS Jupiter, the U.S. Navy's first electrically propelled vessel. Detached from Jupiter in April 1914, Reeves took command of the protected cruiser USS St. Louis. During the remainder of 1914 he was attached temporarily to the gunboat USS Vicksburg, the protected cruiser USS Milwaukee, the armored cruiser USS Colorado, the gunboat USS Annapolis, and the armored cruiser USS South Dakota. In either December 1914 or June 1915 he took command of the battleship Oregon. He left Oregon in either March or June 1916 to become aide to the commandant of Mare Island Navy Yard.

The United States entered World War I in April 1917, and in December 1917 Reeves left Mare Island for war service in command of the battleship USS Maine. Under his command, Maine took part in convoy escort operations in the Atlantic Ocean. He received the Navy Cross for his tour in command of Maine, the citation stating, "For exceptionally meritorious service in a duty of great responsibility as commanding officer of the USS MAINE with the Atlantic Fleet." In September 1918 he became the commanding officer of the battleship USS Kansas, and in October 1918 he began an assignment to the Office of Naval Intelligence in the United States Department of the Navy in Washington, D.C. The war ended on 11 November 1918.

On 15 April 1919, Reeves became the U.S. naval attaché at Rome, Italy. Upon completing this assignment, he assumed command of the armored cruiser USS Pittsburgh in Europe and steamed back to the United States aboard her. On 6 October 1921 he reported to the receiving ship at San Francisco for duty on command, and he became Captain of the Mare Island Navy Yard in November 1921. He afterwards commanded the battleship USS North Dakota (BB-29) in 1922–1923, then attended the United States Naval War College at Newport, Rhode Island. After completing his course work, he spent a year as a member of the college's staff.

==== Entering naval aviation ====
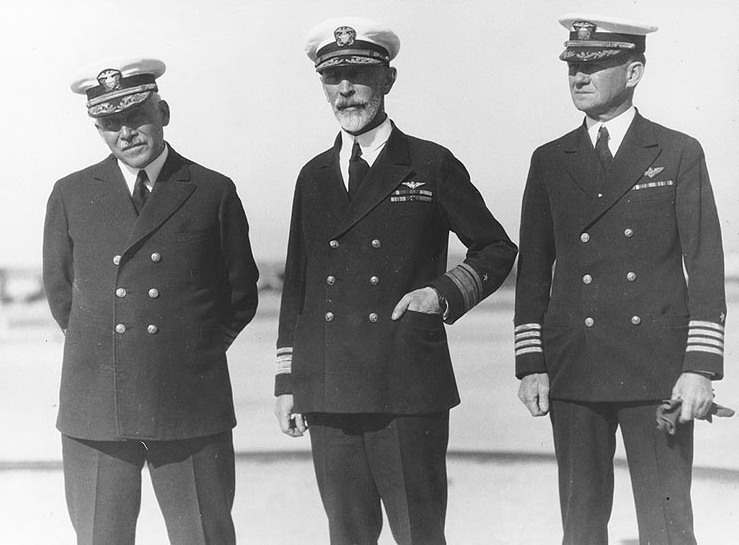
Admiral William V. Pratt (left), Rear Admiral Joseph M. Reeves (center), and Captain Frank R. McCrary (right), at Naval Air Station North Island in San Diego, California, on 27 December 1928.

Upon completing his tour at the Naval War College, Reeves decided to enter the new world of naval aviation. In order to hold a command post, however, he needed to receive aviation training. Like other older officers — notably, Rear Admiral William A. Moffett, Chief of the Navy's new Bureau of Aeronautics — Reeves qualified as a "Naval Aviation Observer" rather than as a "Naval Aviator" (i.e., a pilot). He received his qualification in 1925 and assumed the post of Commander, Aircraft Squadron, Battle Fleet. Though a captain by rank, his position as squadron commander permitted him to fly a commodore's pennant. His flagship was the experimental aircraft carrier USS Langley (CV-1) — his old ship Jupiter, rebuilt for and recommissioned in 1922 as the U.S. Navy's first aircraft carrier. The wooden flight deck was installed over Langley's existing deck structures, giving the vessel the nickname "The Covered Wagon."

While in command of Langley, Reeves worked hard to develop carrier aviation tactics, seeking to increase sortie rates and the use of dive bombing. He proved these concepts by the success of his pilots and aircrew during the U.S. Navy's annual fleet exercises (known as "Fleet Problems").

Reeves served on the Navy's General Board from June 1929 to June 1930. Fifteen months later he became Senior Member of the Board of Inspection and Survey, Pacific Coast Section. Another tour at Mare Island Navy Yard followed and in June 1933 he became Commander, Battleships, Battle Force, with the temporary rank of vice admiral. In July 1933 he was assigned as Commander, Battle Force, United States Fleet, with the rank of admiral.

On 26 February 1934, Reeves was designated Commander-in-Chief, U.S. Fleet. He held this command until June 1936, when he was ordered to Washington, D.C., to serve on the General Board. He held the Board position until 23 November 1936, and retired on 30 November 1936.

==== World War II ====
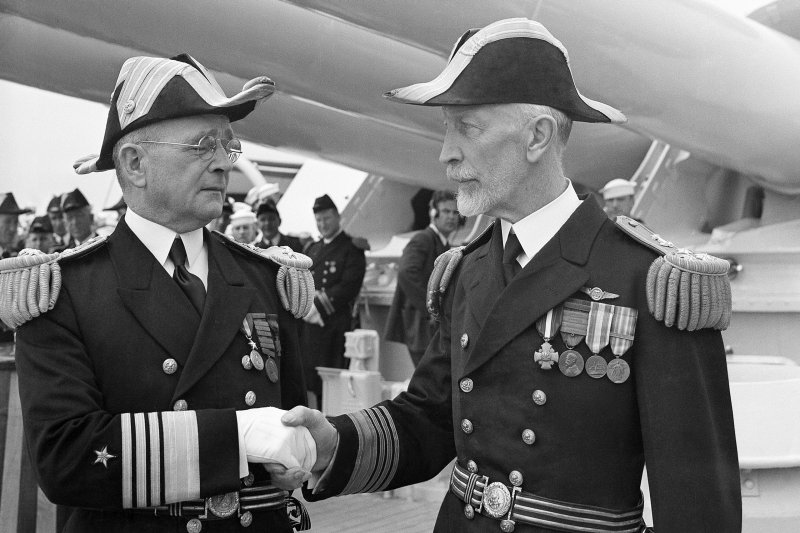
Admiral Arthur Japy Hepburn, left, assuming command of United States Fleet from Admiral Joseph M. Reeves, 24 June 1936.

World War II broke out in Europe on 1 September 1939, and Reeves was recalled to active duty on 13 May 1940, advanced to vice admiral on the retired list, and attached to the Office of the United States Secretary of the Navy. Reeves served simultaneously as Lend-Lease Liaison Officer from March 1941 to December 1945, Senior Military Member of the Munitions Assignments Board and Chairman of the Munitions Assignment Committee (Navy) from 13 February 1942 to 8 November 1945, and Chairman of the Joint Munitions Allocation Committee from 11 January 1944 to 2 September 1945.

In diplomatic relations with the senior military during World war II, Reeves displayed unusual qualities of leadership and rendered invaluable service in carrying out his duties.

During the war Reeves proved to be a good leader and diplomat when communicating with the representatives of the Allies, managing the distribution of finished materials throughout the United Nations.

Reeves retired from the Navy as an admiral in June 1947 and received the Distinguished Service Medal and Legion of Merit for his service. He spent his last years living in Maryland and died at the National Naval Medical Center in Bethesda, Maryland, on 25 March 1948.

== Personal life ==
Together with his wife Eleanor Watkins Reeves, Reeves had three children.

== In popular culture ==
Jack Holt portrayed Reeves in the 1949 film Task Force.

== Legacy ==
A warship and two airfields have been named in honor of Reeves:

- The guided-missile frigate USS Reeves (DLG-24) was commissioned on 15 May 1964 and received three battle stars for Vietnam War service. Reeves was reclassified on 30 June 1975 as a guided-missile cruiser (CG-24). She was decommissioned and stricken from the Navy Register on 12 November 1993 at Pearl Harbor, Hawaii. She was sunk as a target on 31 May 2001 off Queensland, Australia.
- Joseph Mason Reeves Field ("Reeves Field") at Naval Air Station Lemoore, California, was dedicated on 20 November 1961.
- Naval Air Station Reeves Field San Pedro in California (later Naval Air Station Terminal Island), was dedicated during the 1930s. This airfield is no longer active.

== Awards and decorations ==
Reeves earned the following awards and decorations:

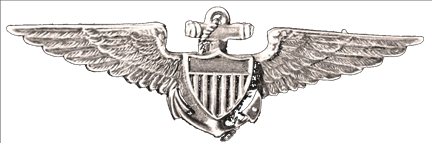

Naval Aviation Observer Badge
1st Row	Navy Cross		Navy Distinguished Service Medal
2nd Row	Legion of Merit	Sampson Medal	Navy Spanish Campaign Medal
3rd Row	World War I Victory Medal with Atlantic Fleet clasp	American Defense Service Medal	American Campaign Medal
4th Row	World War II Victory Medal	Commander of the Order of the Crown of Italy	Commander of the Order of Saints Maurice and Lazarus

== Head coaching record ==
Year	Team	Overall	Conference	Standing	Bowl/playoffs
Navy Midshipmen (Independent) (1907)
1907	Navy	9–2–1			
Navy:		9–2–1			
Total:		9–2–1			

== Notes ==
Military offices
Preceded by David F. Sellers	Commander in Chief, United States Fleet; 26 February 1934 – June 1936	Succeeded by Arthur J. Hepburn
