= Henry A. Wiley =

American Navy admiral (1867–1943)

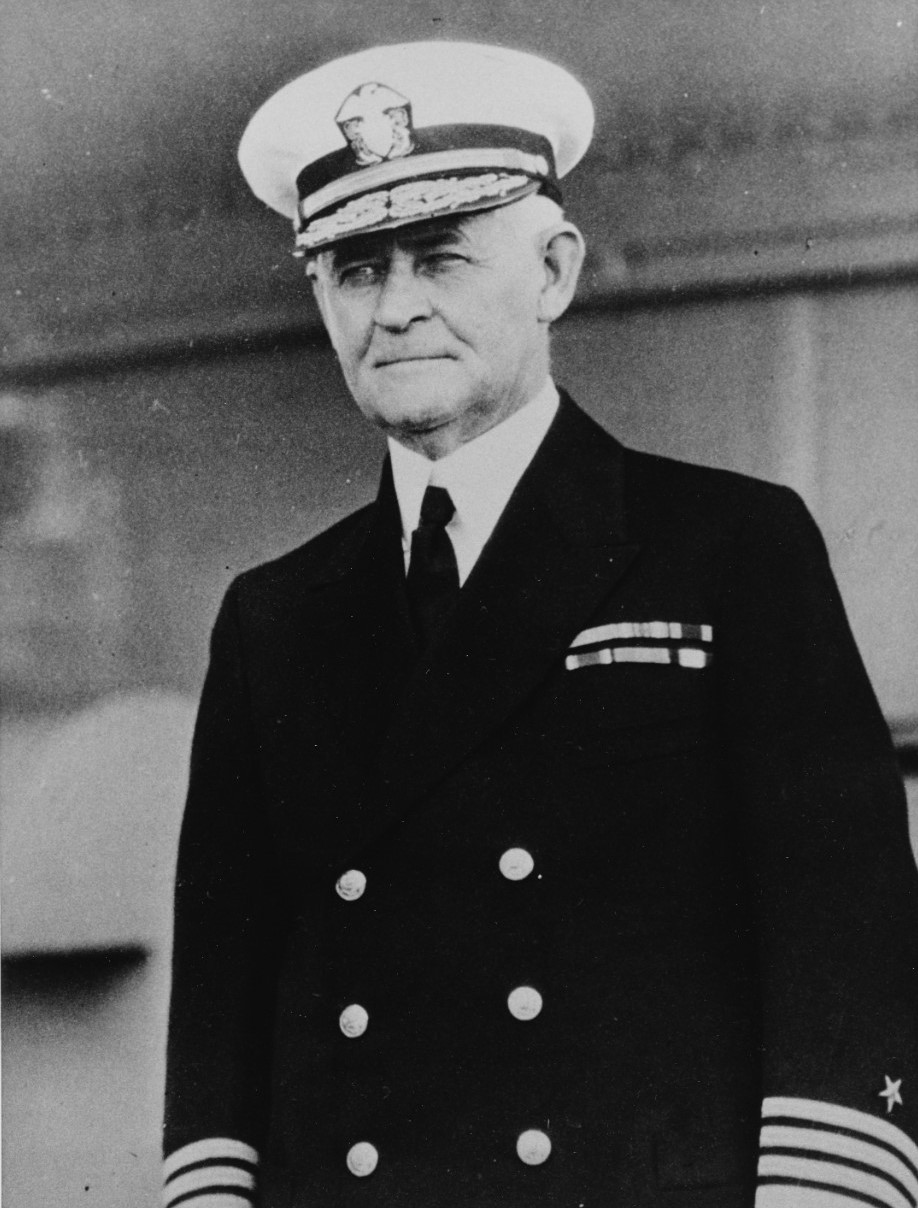
- Admiral Henry A. Wiley
- Born: January 31, 1867; Pike County, Alabama, U.S.
- Died: May 20, 1943 (aged 76); Palm Beach, Florida, U.S.
- Military career
- Allegiance: United States of America
- Branch: United States Navy
- Service years: 1888–1929, 1941–1943
- Rank: Admiral
- Commands: U.S. Fleet
- Conflicts: Spanish–American War; World War I World War II
- Awards: Distinguished Service Medal
- Other work: Chairman, U.S. Maritime Commission

Admiral Henry Ariosto Wiley (31 January 1867 – 20 May 1943) was an officer in the United States Navy during the Spanish–American War, World War I, and World War II.

== Biography ==
Born in Pike County, Alabama, Wiley graduated from the United States Naval Academy in 1888. He served on the Maple during the Spanish–American War and attained his first command, Villalobos, in 1904. During the First World War Wiley commanded battleship USS Wyoming (BB-32) attached to the 6th Battle Squadron of the British Grand Fleet and received the Distinguished Service Medal for his "outstanding performance."

After various shore and fleet commands, he was appointed Admiral in 1927 and served as Commander-in-chief, United States Fleet, until his retirement in 1929 after over 40 years of service.

Wiley wrote his memoirs in 1934.

Wiley served in the years that followed as Chairman of the Maritime Commission and in other important government posts until being recalled to active duty in 1941. In the next year, he headed the Navy Board of Production Awards.

Wiley retired once more 2 January 1943 and died 20 May 1943 at Palm Beach, Florida. He was buried in Arlington National Cemetery four days later.

== Namesake ==
USS Henry A. Wiley was named for him.

Wiley Hall, the main Administration Building at the United States Merchant Marine Academy is named for Admiral Wiley as the "Father of the Merchant Marine Cadet Corps".

Military offices
Preceded by Charles F. Hughes	Commander in Chief, United States Fleet; 1927 – May 21, 1929	Succeeded by William V. Pratt
