= Albert Marshall (American football) =

American football coach

Biographical details
- Born: June 18, 1909
- Died: October 8, 1968 (aged 59)

Coaching career (HC unless noted)
- 1954–1956: Apprentice

Head coaching record
- Overall: 4–21

Albert Claude "Goofy" Marshall (June 18, 1909 – October 8, 1968) was an American football coach. He was the 15th head football coach at The Apprentice School in Newport News, Virginia and he held that position for three seasons, from 1954 until 1956. His coaching record at Apprentice was 4–21.
