= Albert W. Marshall =

American Navy admiral (1874–1958)

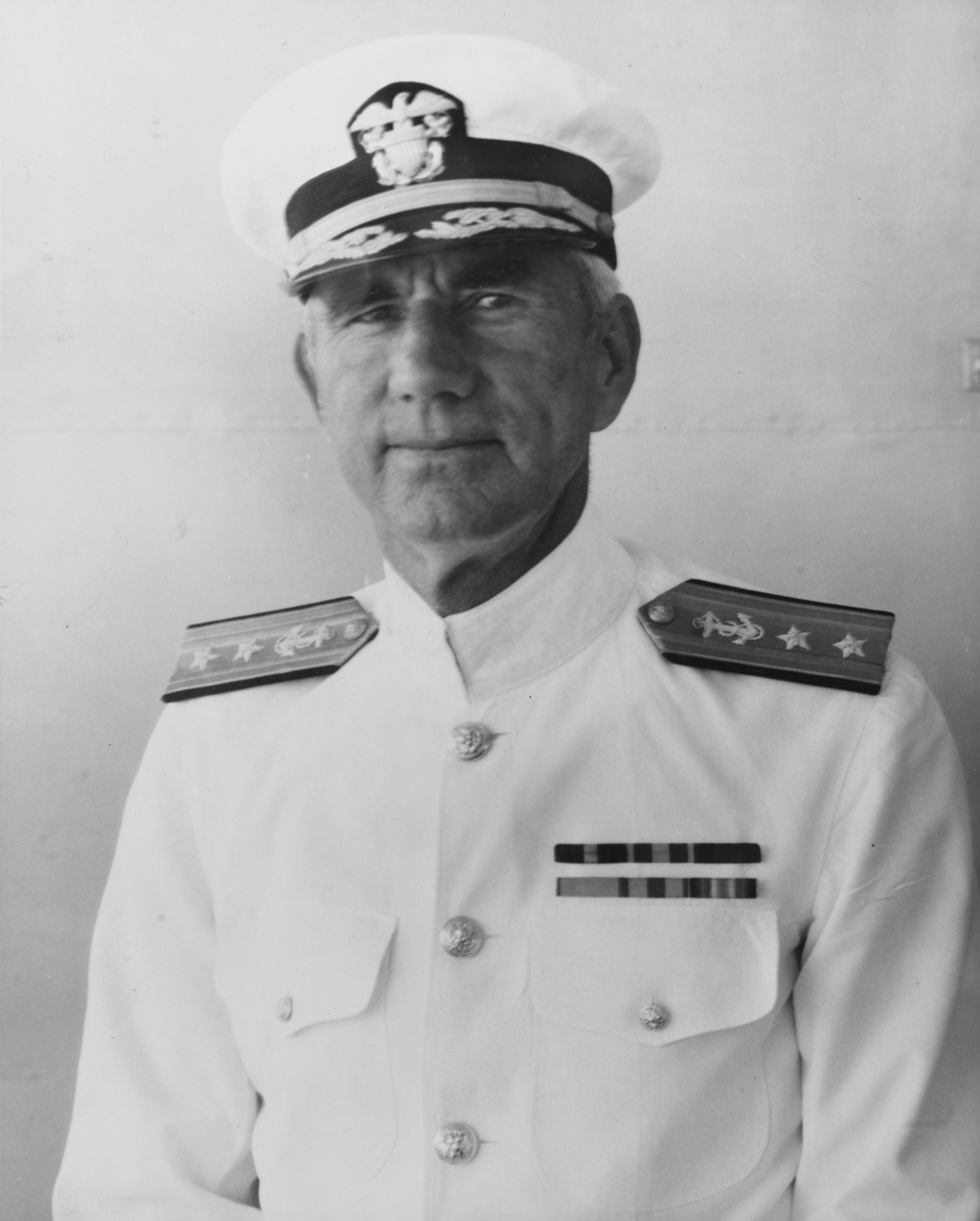
- Born: 6 April 1874; Greenville, Texas
- Died: 8 October 1958 (aged 84) San Diego, California
- Allegiance: United States of America
- Branch: United States Navy
- Service years: 1896–1938
- Rank: Rear Admiral
- Commands: 15th Naval District; Training Squadron One, Fleet Base Force; Naval Air Station Pensacola; Aircraft Squadrons, Scouting Fleet; USS Lexington; Aircraft Squadrons, Battle Fleet; USS Baltimore; USS Machias
- Conflicts: Spanish–American War; Philippine–American War; World War I
- Awards: Navy Distinguished Service Medal

Albert Ware Marshall (6 April 1874 – 8 October 1958) was a United States Navy rear admiral. A decorated veteran of World War I, he became an early advocate of naval aviation and served as the first commanding officer of the carrier USS Lexington.

== Early life and education ==
Marshall was born in Greenville, Texas. He entered the United States Naval Academy from Texas in 1892 and graduated in June 1896. Marshall later graduated from the Naval War College in 1920. In his early fifties, he qualified as a naval aviation observer in 1925 and subsequently was designated Naval Aviator No. 3300 after completing flight training at Pensacola, Florida in 1926. In 1930, Marshall qualified for a commercial transport license in both land and seaplanes.

== Military career ==
After graduating from the Naval Academy, Marshall served aboard the cruiser USS Baltimore in the Asiatic Squadron during the Spanish–American War and the beginning of the Philippine Insurrection. On 3 October 1899, he led a landing party of twenty-four sailors who accompanied Capt. John T. Myers and twenty Marines from Baltimore at Bacoor. The Marines joined a larger force of Marines and United States Army soldiers in a successful action against Philippine rebels at Imus the following day.

From April 1915 to June 1916, Marshall served as the commanding officer of the gunboat USS Machias. From June to October 1915, Machias was part of the U.S. squadron patrolling near Veracruz, Mexico during the Mexican Revolution.

From August 1916 to February 1919, Marshall commanded his former ship the Baltimore. Converted from a cruiser to a minelayer, during World War I she laid anti-submarine mines near Northern Ireland and then in the North Sea between Scotland and Norway. Marshall was subsequently awarded the Navy Distinguished Service Medal for his leadership. His temporary promotion to captain during the war was made permanent on 8 June 1920.

Marshall was given command of the aircraft squadrons of the Battle Fleet in 1922. From December 1927 to August 1928, he served as commanding officer of the carrier Lexington. Marshall was promoted to rear admiral effective 11 June 1928. From September 1928 to May 1929, he commanded the aircraft squadrons of the Scouting Fleet.

From May 1929 to July 1931, Marshall served as the commander of Naval Air Station Pensacola. From 1931 to 1933, he was commander of Training Squadron One, Fleet Base Force. From 1935 to 1937, Marshall served as commanding officer of the 15th Naval District based at Balboa in the Panama Canal Zone. He retired from active duty on 1 May 1938, having reached the age of sixty-four.

== Personal ==
Marshall was the son of Andrew Soulé Marshall, a former Confederate Army officer, and Mary Jane (Martin) Marshall.

Marshall married Mabel Eleanor Flinn (13 August 1874 – 25 January 1952) on 14 November 1899. They had one son.

After his wife's death, Marshall lived in Coronado, California. He died at the Balboa Naval Hospital and was interred at Fort Rosecrans National Cemetery on 14 October 1958.
