= Bertie Marshall (cricketer) =

English cricketer

Personal information
- Full name: Bertie Marshall
- Born: 5 May 1902; Sutton-in-Ashfield, Nottinghamshire, England
- Died: 5 February 1991 (aged 88); Durham, County Durham, England
- Batting: Right-handed
- Bowling: Right-arm fast

Domestic team information
- Years: Team
- 1939: Staffordshire
- 1923–1929: Nottinghamshire

Career statistics
Competition	First-class
Matches	4
Runs scored	61
Batting average	15.25
100s/50s	–/–
Top score	36
Balls bowled	372
Wickets	5
Bowling average	40.60
5 wickets in innings	–
10 wickets in match	–
Best bowling	2/29
Catches/stumpings	3/–
- Source: Cricinfo, 27 March 2014

Bertie Marshall (5 May 1902 – 5 February 1991) was an English cricketer active from 1923 to 1929, making four appearances in first-class cricket for Nottinghamshire. Born at Sutton-in-Ashfield, Nottinghamshire, Marshall was a right-handed batsman and right-arm fast bowler.

Marshall made his first-class debut for Nottinghamshire against Derbyshire at Trent Bridge in the 1923 County Championship. He made two further appearances in the 1924 County Championship against Worcestershire and Glamorgan, before playing his fourth match some five years later in the 1929 County Championship against Middlesex. He scored a total of 61 runs in his four matches, top-scoring with 36. With the ball he took 5 wickets at an expensive average of 40.60, with best figures of 2/39. Ten years later he played four matches for Staffordshire in the 1939 Minor Counties Championship.

He died at Durham, County Durham on 5 February 1991.
