= United States Fleet =

Former division of the US Navy

The United States Fleet was an organization in the United States Navy from 1922 until after World War II. The acronym CINCUS, pronounced "sink us", was used for the Commander in Chief, United States Fleet. This was replaced by COMINCH in December, 1941, under the Executive Order 8984, when it was redefined and given operational command over the Atlantic, Pacific, and Asiatic Fleets, as well as all naval coastal forces. The Executive Order 9096 authorized the offices of the CNO and COMINCH to be held by a single officer; Admiral Ernest J. King was first to do so, and in 1944 was promoted to the five-star rank of fleet admiral.

== Establishment ==
The directive of 6 December 1922 combined the U.S. Pacific Fleet and the U.S. Atlantic Fleet to form the United States Fleet. The main body of its ships, the Battle Fleet, was stationed in the Pacific Ocean and the Scouting Fleet was stationed in the Atlantic Ocean. In addition, the "Control Force", protecting the Atlantic sea lanes, and the "Fleet Base Force" were included. Remaining independent of the United States Fleet were the Asiatic Fleet, the Naval Forces in Europe, the Special Service Squadron (Caribbean), and all U.S. Navy submarines.

During 1930, the Battle Fleet and Scouting Fleet were renamed the Battle Force and the Scouting Force. The Submarine Force was also placed under control of the CINCUS. The Control Force was abolished in 1931. The Special Service Squadron and the Asiatic Fleet were retained, both still apparently independent of the U.S. Fleet. The United States Fleet was reorganized on 1 April 1931 into Battle Force, Scouting Force, Submarine Force, and Base Force.

== Reorganization in 1941 ==
With the start of World War II in Europe, the U.S. Navy began to plan for the possibility of war in the Atlantic as well as the Pacific. On 1 February 1941, General Order 143 was issued, abolishing the "United States Fleet" organization. In its place, the U.S. Atlantic Fleet and the U.S. Pacific Fleet were re-established, each under its own commander in chief. The Asiatic Fleet remained an independent organization as before.

The additional title of Commander in Chief, United States Fleet was given to one of the three fleet commanders (Atlantic, Pacific, or Asiatic) in the event of two or more fleets operating together. Except for this provision, the individual commanders in chief were responsible directly to the President of the United States and the Secretary of the Navy.

Rear Admiral Husband E. Kimmel was appointed the Commander in Chief, United States Fleet (CINCUS) and the Commander in Chief, United States Pacific Fleet (CINCPAC) on 1 February 1941, carrying the temporary rank of admiral starting on that date. Kimmel was relieved as the CINCUS / CINCPAC on 17 December 1941, shortly after the devastating Japanese attack on Pearl Harbor.

On the following day, by Executive Order 8984 of 18 December 1941, the position of Commander in Chief, United States Fleet (COMINCH) was redefined, and given operational command over the Atlantic, Pacific, and Asiatic Fleets, as well as all naval coastal forces. The acronym change from CINCUS to COMINCH was suggested by Admiral Ernest J. King, who feared that the pronunciation of the post would be demoralizing in the wake of the Pearl Harbor attack. On 20 December, Admiral Ernest J. King was assigned as the COMINCH. One important difference from the previous post of CINCUS was that Admiral King insisted that his headquarters would always be in Washington, D.C., rather than with the Fleet.

Dividing command of the Navy between the COMINCH, Admiral King, and the Chief of Naval Operations (CNO), Admiral Harold R. Stark, did not prove to be very effective. President Franklin D. Roosevelt addressed this problem with his Executive Order 9096 of 12 March 1942, which designated that the offices of the CNO and COMINCH would be held by a single officer, and Admiral King was selected to be CNO in addition to being COMINCH. King relieved Stark as CNO on 29 March 1942, and wore both of these "hats" for the remainder of the war.

== Abolition ==
After the war, the position of Commander in Chief, United States Fleet was no longer needed. Thus, on 29 September 1945, President Harry S. Truman signed Executive Order 9635, which revoked both EO 8984 & EO 9096 and transferred all the responsibilities of the COMINCH to the CNO. Since that time, the CNO has nearly always been the highest-ranking U.S. Navy officer. Following passage of the National Security Act of 1947, the CNO is by law the highest-ranking naval officer on active duty, except when the Chairman of the Joint Chiefs of Staff (a position created by the 1949 amendments of the National Security Act) and/or the Vice Chairman of the Joint Chiefs of Staff (a position created by the Goldwater-Nichols Act in 1986) is also a U.S. Navy officer.

== Leadership ==
Commanders of the United States Fleet:

- Hilary P. Jones 7 December 1922 – 3 August 1923
- Robert E. Coontz 4 August 1923 – 30 September 1925
- Samuel S. Robison 1 October 1925 – 4 September 1926
- Charles F. Hughes 5 September 1926 – 7 November 1927
- Henry A. Wiley 8 November 1927 – 7 March 1929
- William V. Pratt 8 March 1929 – 16 September 1930
- Jehu V. Chase 17 September 1930 – 15 September 1931
- Frank H. Schofield 16 September 1931 – 9 August 1932
- Richard H. Leigh 10 August 1932 – 10 June 1933
- David F. Sellers 10 June 1933 – 18 June 1934
- Joseph M. Reeves 26 February 1934 – 23 June 1936
- Arthur J. Hepburn 24 June 1936 – 31 January 1938
- Claude C. Bloch 1 February 1938 – 6 January 1940
- James O. Richardson 6 January 1940 – 5 January 1941
- Husband Kimmel 5 January 1941 – 17 December 1941
- William S. Pye (temporary) 17 December 1941 – 30 December 1941.
- Ernest King (also Chief of Naval Operations from 12 March 1942) 30 December 1941 – 10 October 1945

== Sources ==
- Buell, Thomas. Master of Sea Power: A Biography of Fleet Admiral Ernest J. King. Boston: Little Brown & Co. 1980. ISBN 0-316-11469-3.
- Furer, Julius. Administration of the Navy Department in World War II. Washington D.C.: U.S. Government Printing Office, 1959.
- King, Ernest J., and Walter M. Whitehill. Fleet Admiral King: A Naval Record. New York, WW Norton & Co. 1952.
- Polmar, Norman (2005). The Naval Institute Guide to the Ships and Aircraft of the U.S. Fleet (18th ed.). Naval Institute Press. ISBN 978-1-591-14685-8.
