= Charles Frederick Hughes =

United States Navy admiral (1866–1934)

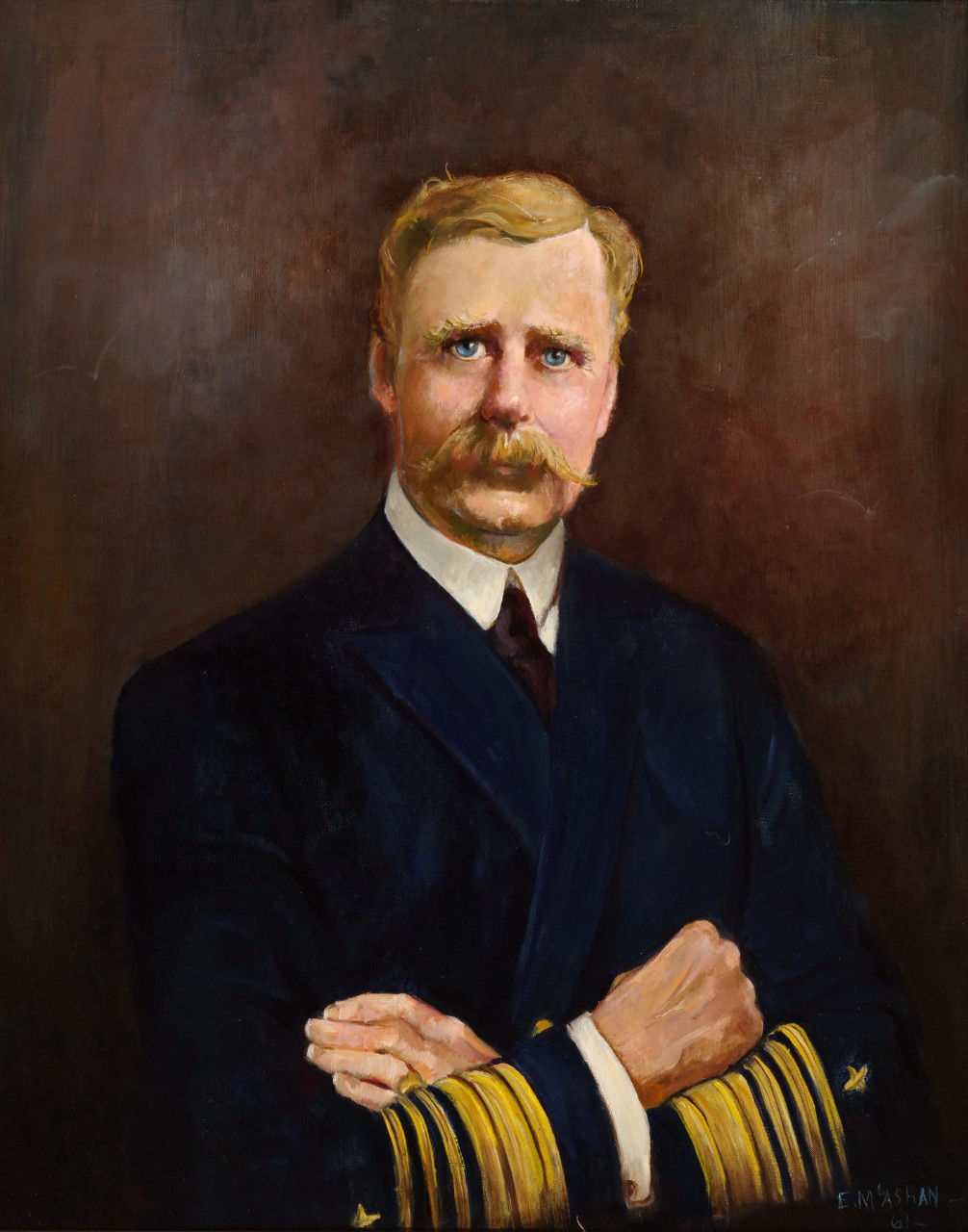
- Born: October 14, 1866; Bath, Maine, US
- Died: May 28, 1934 (aged 67); Chevy Chase, Maryland, US
- Burial place: Arlington National Cemetery
- Military career
- Branch: United States Navy
- Service years: 1884–1930
- Rank: Admiral
- Commands: Chief of Naval Operations; United States Fleet; Battle Fleet; 2d Battleship Squadron, Atlantic Fleet; Philadelphia Navy Yard; USS New York; USS Des Moines; USS Birmingham
- Conflicts: Spanish–American War; World War I
- Awards: Navy Distinguished Service Medal

Charles Frederick Hughes (14 October 1866 – 28 May 1934) was an admiral in the United States Navy who served as Chief of Naval Operations from 1927 to 1930.

== Early life ==
Born in Bath, Maine, Hughes was appointed to the United States Naval Academy in 1884. Upon graduation on 8 June 1888, he went to the Fleet for the customary two years at sea preceding a commission as an ensign. He received that commission on 1 July 1890, and was promoted to lieutenant (junior grade) on 27 April 1898.

== Naval career ==
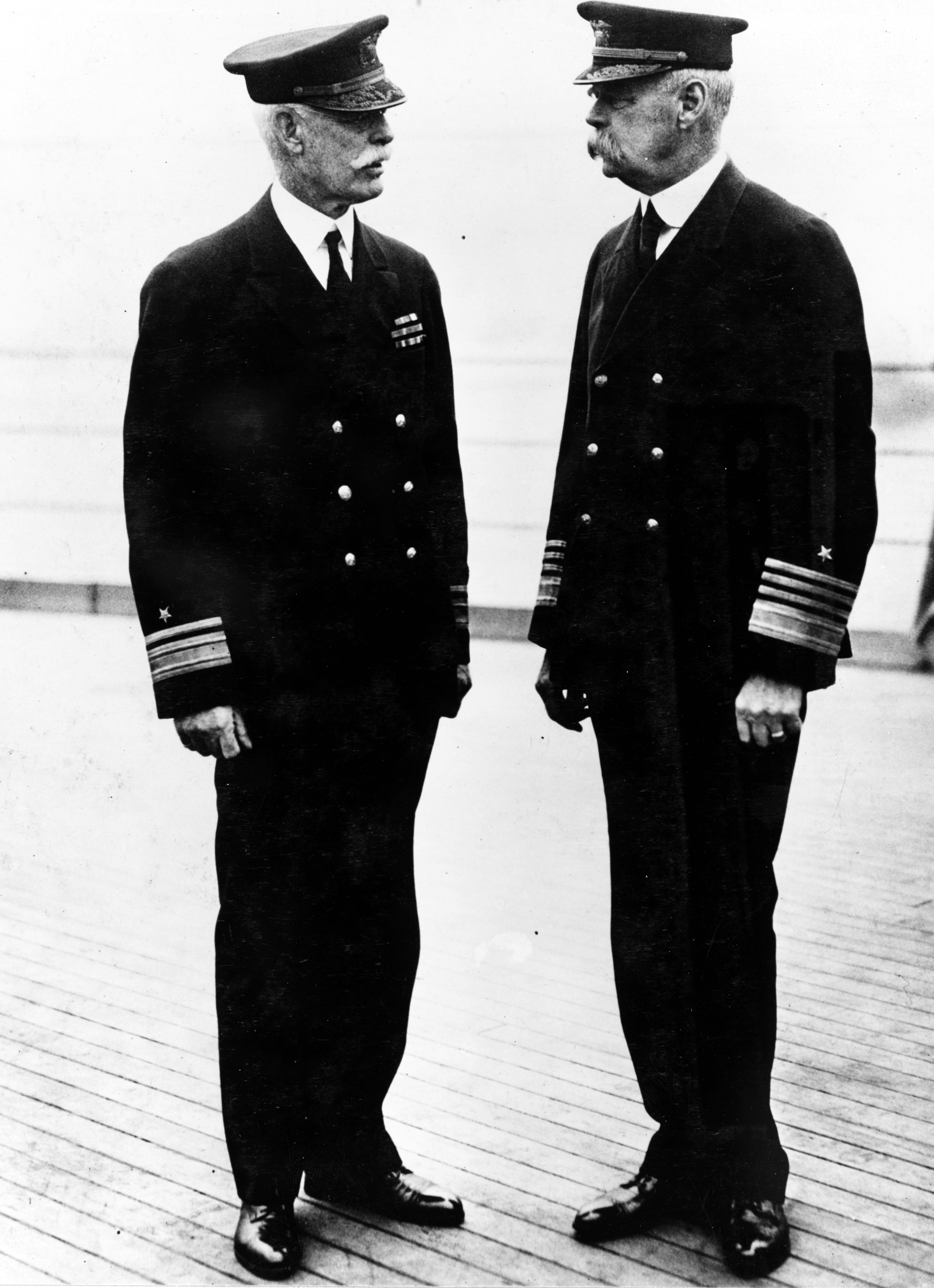
Admiral Hughes with Rear Admiral C.P. Plunkett

During the Spanish–American War, Hughes fought in Commodore George Dewey's Asiatic Squadron. He was promoted to lieutenant on 3 March 1899. While serving ashore at the Bureau of Equipment from 1904 to 1906, he was promoted to lieutenant commander on 1 July 1905. During a tour of duty as recorder for the Board of Inspection and Survey between 1909 and 1911, he was promoted to commander.

Hughes assumed command of USS Birmingham (Scout Cruiser No. 2) in 1911 and plied the troubled waters along the Mexican gulf coast in that ship and, later, in command of USS Des Moines (Cruiser No. 15). In 1913, Hughes became chief of staff to the Commander, Atlantic Fleet, and served in that capacity during the occupation of Veracruz, Veracruz, Mexico, in the spring of 1914. Promoted to captain on 10 July 1914, he returned to shore duty later that year to serve with the General Board. Hughes took command of USS New York (Battleship No. 34) in October 1916. His ship served in the American battleship squadron that operated with the Royal Navy's Grand Fleet at Scapa Flow in the Orkney Islands through World War I.

Hughes left New York just before the Armistice. On 10 October 1918, he was promoted to rear admiral. His first assignment as a flag officer was as commandant at the Philadelphia Navy Yard from late 1918 to 1920. Between 1920 and 1921, Hughes was Commander, 2d Battleship Squadron, Atlantic Fleet. From the latter part of 1921 to 25 June 1923 he commanded Divisions 7 and 4 of the Battle Fleet. Coming ashore again in 1923, he became President of the Naval War College at Newport, Rhode Island, on 1 July. A year later, Hughes moved to the job of Director of Fleet Training.

That assignment lasted until 10 October 1925. Soon thereafter, Hughes was appointed Commander in Chief, Battle Fleet. On 14 November 1927 Admiral Hughes became the fourth person to occupy the office of Chief of Naval Operations. He completed his tour of duty in that post on 11 September 1930 and, on 14 October 1930, retired to his home in Chevy Chase, Maryland. He died in 1934 and was buried in Arlington National Cemetery.

USS Charles F. Hughes (DD-428) and USS Admiral C. F. Hughes (AP-124) were named in his honor.

Military offices
Preceded by Edward W. Eberle	Chief of Naval Operations; 1927–1930	Succeeded by William V. Pratt
Preceded by Samuel S. Robison	Commander in Chief, United States Fleet; 1926–1927	Succeeded by Henry A. Wiley
