= William V. Pratt =

American admiral (1869–1957)

William Veazie Pratt
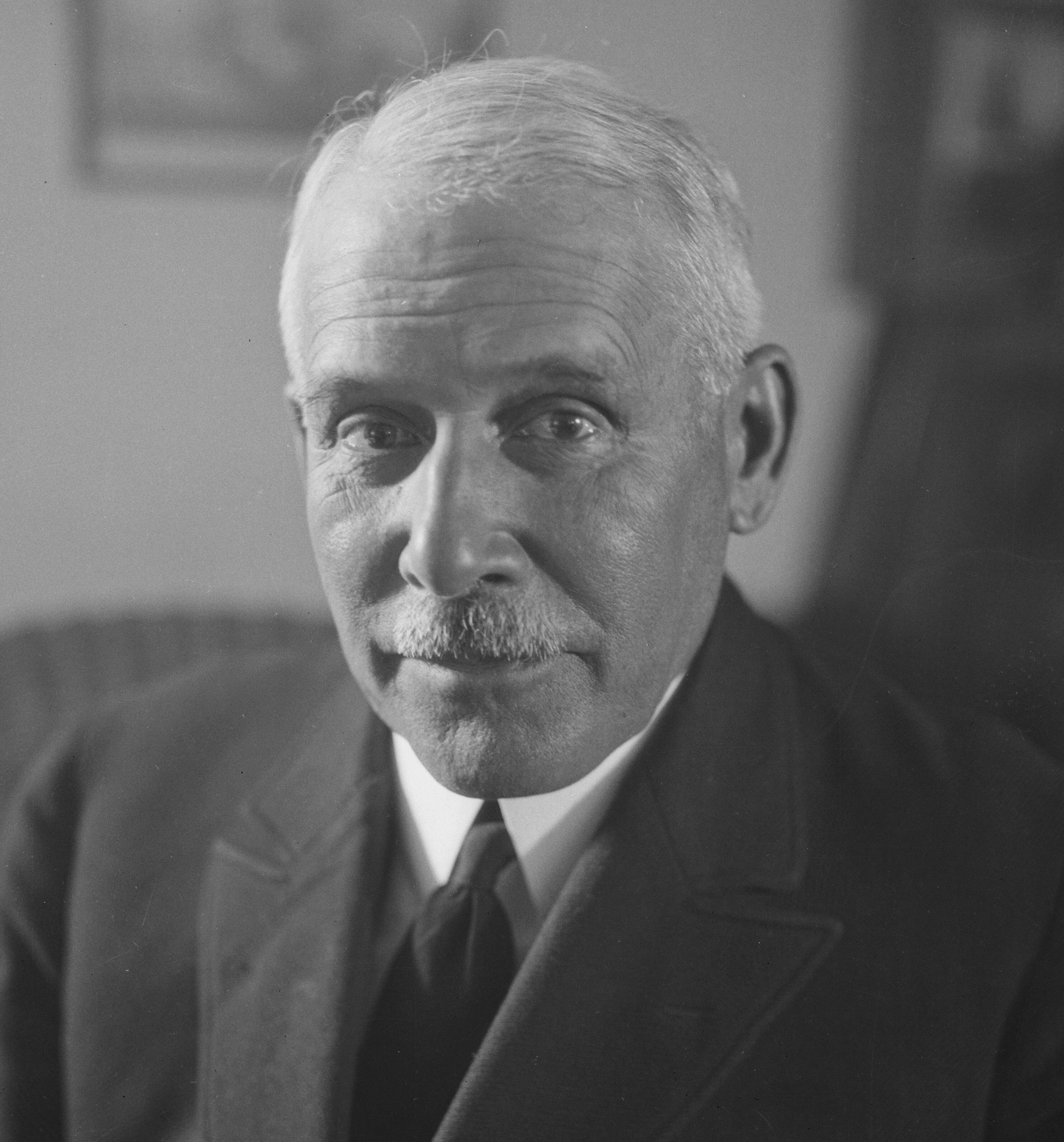
- Pratt in 1929
- Born: February 28, 1869; Belfast, Maine, US
- Died: November 25, 1957 (aged 88)
- Military career
- Branch: United States Navy
- Service years: 1889–1933
- Rank: Admiral
- Commands: Chief of Naval Operations; United States Fleet; Battle Fleet; Destroyer Force, Pacific Fleet; USS New York; USS Birmingham
- Conflicts: Spanish–American War; Philippine–American War; World War I
- Awards: Navy Distinguished Service Medal; Army Distinguished Service Medal

William Veazie Pratt (28 February 1869 - 25 November 1957) was an admiral in the United States Navy. He served as the President of the Naval War College from 1925 to 1927, and as the fifth Chief of Naval Operations from 1930 to 1933.

== Early life ==
William V. Pratt was born on 28 February 1869, in Belfast, Maine. He was the son of Nichols Pratt, who entered the Union Navy in August 1862 as an acting master’s mate and was promoted to acting master in April 1865 during the Civil War.

== Naval career ==
After graduating from the United States Naval Academy in 1889, Pratt served in several cruisers and gunboats, visiting Europe, South America, and Asia. During 1895–97, Ensign Pratt had the first of three instructor tours at the Naval Academy. He was assigned to the gunboat USS Mayflower during the Spanish–American War and to the cruiser USS Newark afterwards. While in the latter, he returned to Asiatic waters, where he saw action in the Philippine–American War. A second Naval Academy session followed in 1900–1902, after which he served in the North Atlantic Fleet flagship USS Kearsarge.

Lieutenant Commander Pratt's final Naval Academy tour took place in 1905–1908. He then was executive officer of the cruisers USS St. Louis and USS California. Promoted to the rank of commander in 1910, Pratt was an instructor at the Naval War College in 1911–1913 and spent the next two years in the Atlantic Torpedo Flotilla, much of that as commanding officer of its flagship, the scout cruiser USS Birmingham. Captain Pratt was assigned to the United States Army in Panama and at the Army War College in 1915–1917. During World War I he served in Washington, DC, as Assistant Chief of Naval Operations in 1918.

Pratt was at sea in 1919–1921 as commanding officer of the battleship USS New York and as Commander Destroyer Force, Pacific Fleet. Following promotion to rear admiral in mid-1921, he was a member of the General Board in Washington, DC, and served as a technical advisor during the negotiations that led to the Washington Naval Limitations Treaty of February 1922. He commanded a battleship division in 1923–1925 and was president of the court of inquiry that examined the 8 September 1923 Honda Point Disaster. Assignments followed to the General Board and as president of the Naval War College. In 1927, he returned to sea as Commander Battleship Divisions, Battle Fleet. A year later, he became Commander Battle Fleet in the rank of admiral and in 1929–1930 was commander in chief of United States Fleet.

Pratt's work with the U.S. Fleet was interrupted in early 1930 by a trip to England to participate in the London conference that further limited the size of the world's major navies. He became Chief of Naval Operations in September 1930 and spent nearly three years in that post, during a time when Depression-era demands for economy made it very difficult to maintain the Navy's size and readiness. During his tenure, he also helped Coast Guard Commandant Harry G. Hamlet in discouraging President Franklin D. Roosevelt from merging the Navy and Coast Guard. Pratt agreed with President Herbert Hoovers's emphasis on disarmament and went along with postponement of new construction and cutting the fleet. Other naval officers disagreed sharply with Hoover's policies.

== Later life ==
Retired at the beginning of July 1933, Pratt lived thereafter in Maine and New York City. During World War II, he wrote a regular column for a nationally circulated magazine and spent several months on active Navy Department duty in 1941 studying measures to counter the German submarine threat. Pratt died at the Naval Hospital, Chelsea, Massachusetts, on 25 November 1957.

Like his father, Pratt was a companion of the District of Columbia Commandery of the Military Order of the Loyal Legion of the United States.

== Legacy ==
In 1960, the destroyer USS William V. Pratt (DLG-13, later DDG-44) was named in honor of Admiral Pratt.

Military offices
Preceded by Charles F. Hughes	Chief of Naval Operations; 1930–1933	Succeeded by William H. Standley
Preceded by Henry A. Wiley	Commander in Chief, United States Fleet; 1929–1930	Succeeded by Frank H. Schofield
Preceded by Clarence Stewart Williams	President of the Naval War College; 1925–1927	Succeeded by Joel R. P. Pringle
