= Frank Herman Schofield =

United States Navy admiral

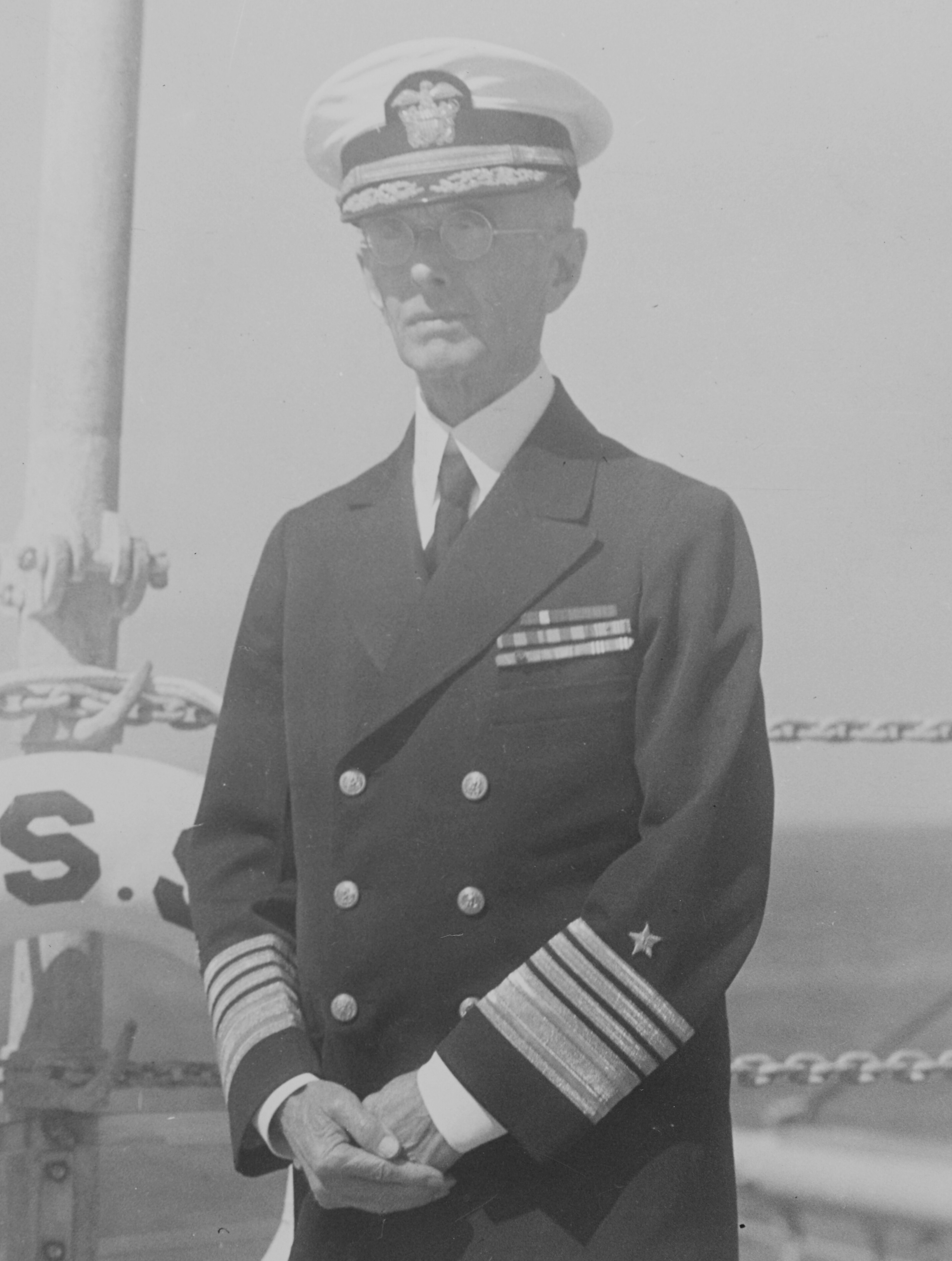
- Born: January 4, 1869; Jerusalem, New York, US
- Died: February 20, 1942 (aged 73); Bethesda, Maryland, US
- Burial place: Arlington National Cemetery
- Military career
- Allegiance: United States
- Branch: United States Navy
- Service years: 1890–1933
- Rank: Admiral
- Commands: USS Perry (DD-11); USS Texas (BB-35); Commander in Chief, Battle Force
- Conflicts: Spanish–American War; World War I
- Awards: Navy Cross

Frank Herman Schofield (January 4, 1869 – February 20, 1942) was a decorated admiral in the United States Navy, where he served with distinction in the Spanish–American War and World War I. He was also acting governor of Guam from January 11, 1904, to January 28, 1904.

== Military career ==
Born in Jerusalem, New York, Schofield graduated from the United States Naval Academy on June 6, 1890, and was commissioned ensign in 1892. During the Spanish–American War, he served as executive officer of the Hawk, participating in the blockade of Cuban ports and in the capture of four enemy ships.

Between 1898 and 1917, he served in various capacities afloat and ashore including duty in the Office of the Chief of Naval Operations and a brief position as acting Governor of Guam from January 11, 1904, to January 28, 1904. During this time, while commanding the Supply he reported seeing "three meteors which he says appeared near the horizon and below the clouds, traveling in a group directly toward the Supply", which has been interpreted by some as an early UFO observation. After American entry into World War I, he was ordered to London, where he served on the staff of Commander, U.S. Naval Forces, European Waters until December 1918. He then assumed duties on the United States Naval Advisory Staff to the Peace Commission in Paris. Awarded the Navy Cross for his World War I and Peace Commission service, he was detached from the Naval Advisory Staff in May 1919 and, in July, returned to sea duty as commanding officer of the battleship, Texas.

During the 1920s, he served on the General Board from 1921 to 1923; was promoted to Rear Admiral in 1924; commanded Destroyer Squadrons, Battle Fleet, from 1924 to 1926; headed the War Plans Division of the Office of the Chief of Naval Operations from 1926 to 1929; was a member of the Naval Advisory Staff, Geneva Conference in 1927; and commanded Battleship Division 4, Battle Fleet in 1929. In 1930, he was commissioned Commander in Chief, Battle Force, with the accompanying rank of admiral; and in 1933, after 47 years of service, he retired. Admiral Schofield died at Bethesda, Maryland, on February 20, 1942. He was buried at Arlington National Cemetery.

Military offices
Preceded by Jehu V. Chase	Commander in Chief, United States Fleet; 1931–1932	Succeeded by Richard H. Leigh
