= Ben B. Lindsey =

American judge and social reformer (1869–1943)

Benjamin Barr Lindsey
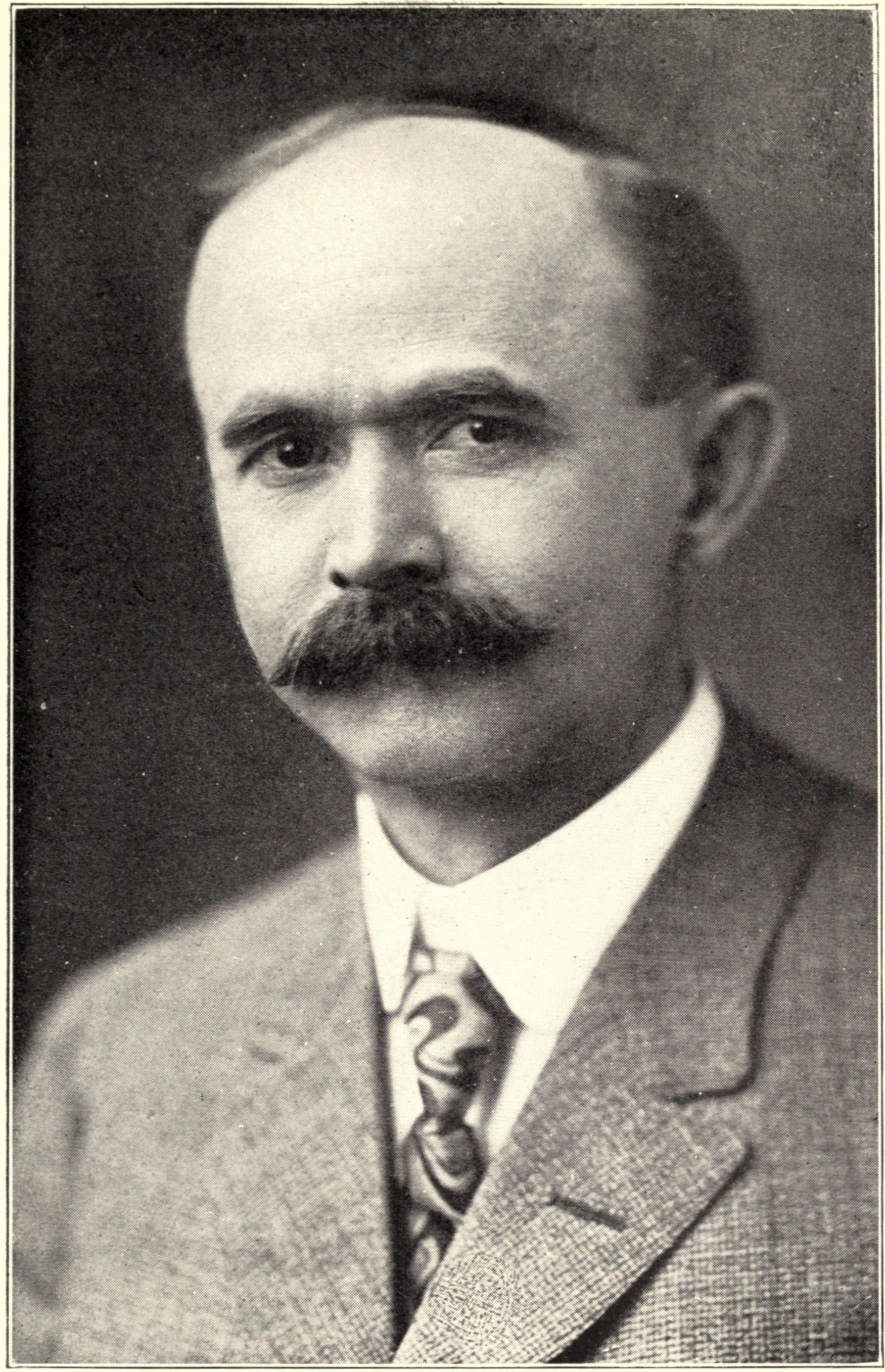
- Born: November 25, 1869; Jackson, Tennessee, US
- Died: March 26, 1943 (aged 73); Los Angeles, California, US
- Occupations: Judge, social reformer

Benjamin Barr Lindsey (November 25, 1869 – March 26, 1943) was an American judge and social reformer based in Denver during the Progressive Era. He is best known for developing a juvenile court system for youth in trouble.

== Early life ==
Benjamin Barr Lindsey was born in Jackson, Tennessee, to former Confederate captain Landy Tunstall Lindsey. He was educated in the public schools and attended Southwest Baptist University (now Union University). His father committed suicide when Ben was 18, leaving him the sole support of his mother and her three younger children. He obtained employment in a real-estate office in Denver, where he studied law in his spare time. In despair over his slow progress in his law studies, he attempted suicide, but his gun misfired. In 1894, he entered the practice of law in Denver. In his work, he was often assisted by his wife, Henrietta, whom he had married in 1914. He was appointed to a vacancy in the county court in 1900.

== Juvenile court ==
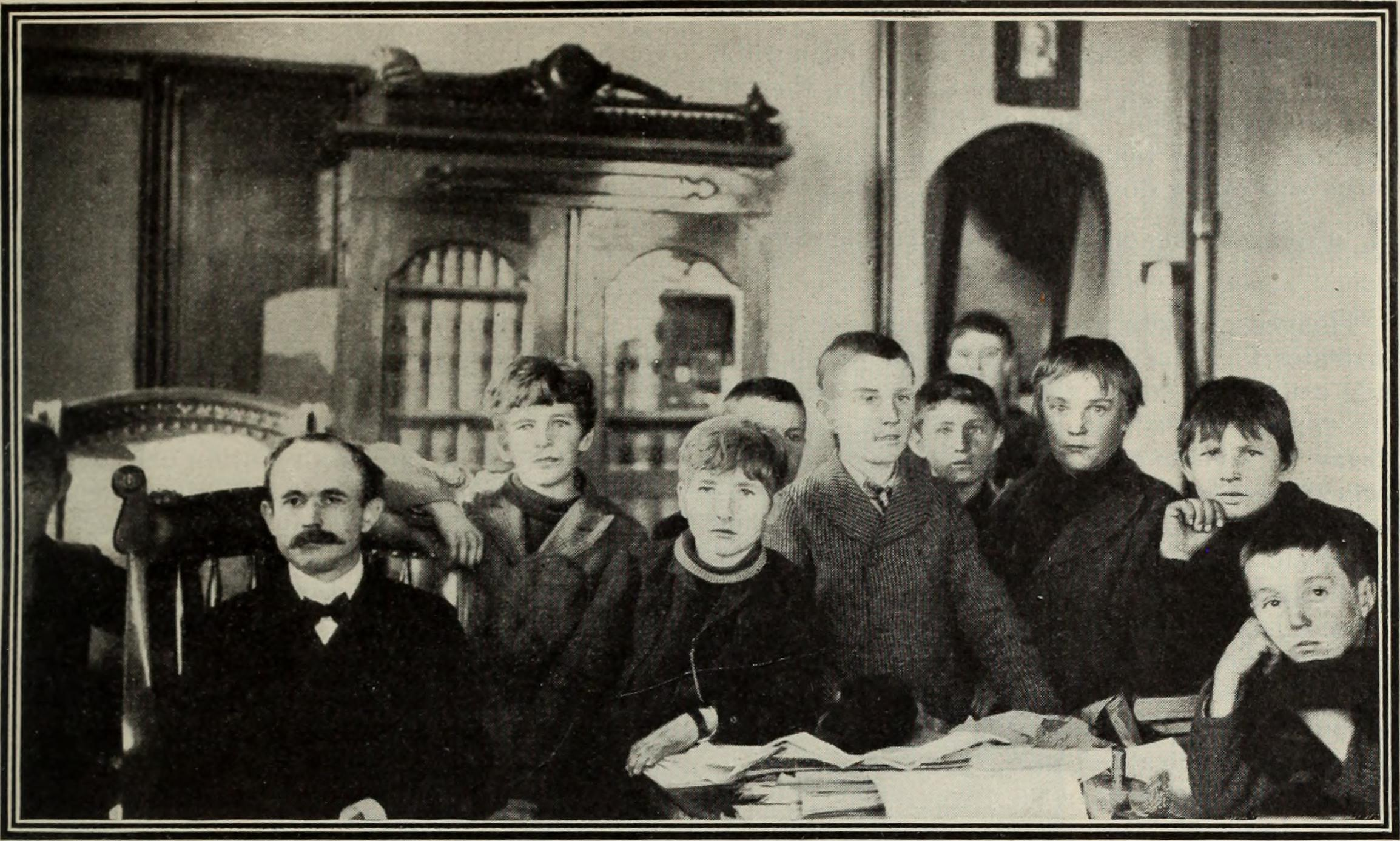
Judge Ben B. Lindsey, of Denver, Colorado, with some of his boys.Review of reviews and world's work (1890) (14784362802)

Lindsey was a pioneer in the establishment of the juvenile court system. Through his efforts, an act was passed creating a juvenile court in Denver which represented an important advance in relation of the law to children and would go on to serve as a model for future juvenile courts across America. Lindsey was made judge of the juvenile court in 1901 (which became a juvenile and family relations court in 1907). He held the position continuously, but he was not endorsed by either political party in 1908.

While working to gain support for the juvenile court, Lindsey enlisted the assistance of Denver resident, Margaret Brown.

Among other measures to which Lindsey contributed his influence were a reform of the registration law, greatly reducing election frauds; a reform of the ballot; state provisions for the support of the dependents of people serving in prison; extension of the probation system for prisoners; organization of public baths and playgrounds in Denver; the institution of the fresh-air movement in Denver; and enactment of statewide Mother's Pension Law.

He was a leader in the movement to abolish child labor. He carried on an active propaganda for the general adoption of the juvenile court plan, and for political and social reform, through lectures delivered in many American and foreign cities and through the publication of books and pamphlets, of which The Beast (with Harvey J. O'Higgins, 1910) was widely circulated. In 1906, Lindsey was a candidate for governor of Colorado, and in 1912 became a member of the Progressive National Committee.

== Companionate marriage ==
In early 1927, Lindsey co-wrote a controversial book about what he called The Companionate Marriage, in which he suggested that young men and women should be able to live together in a trial marriage, where the couple could have a year to evaluate whether or not they were suitable with each other. The only caveat was they had to agree not to have children. If after a year, the couple decided to stay together, they could do so, but if the relationship didn't work out, they would be able to dissolve the relationship easily. Also, if they decided they were compatible and did want children, they could change the status of their relationship to a traditionally understood marriage.

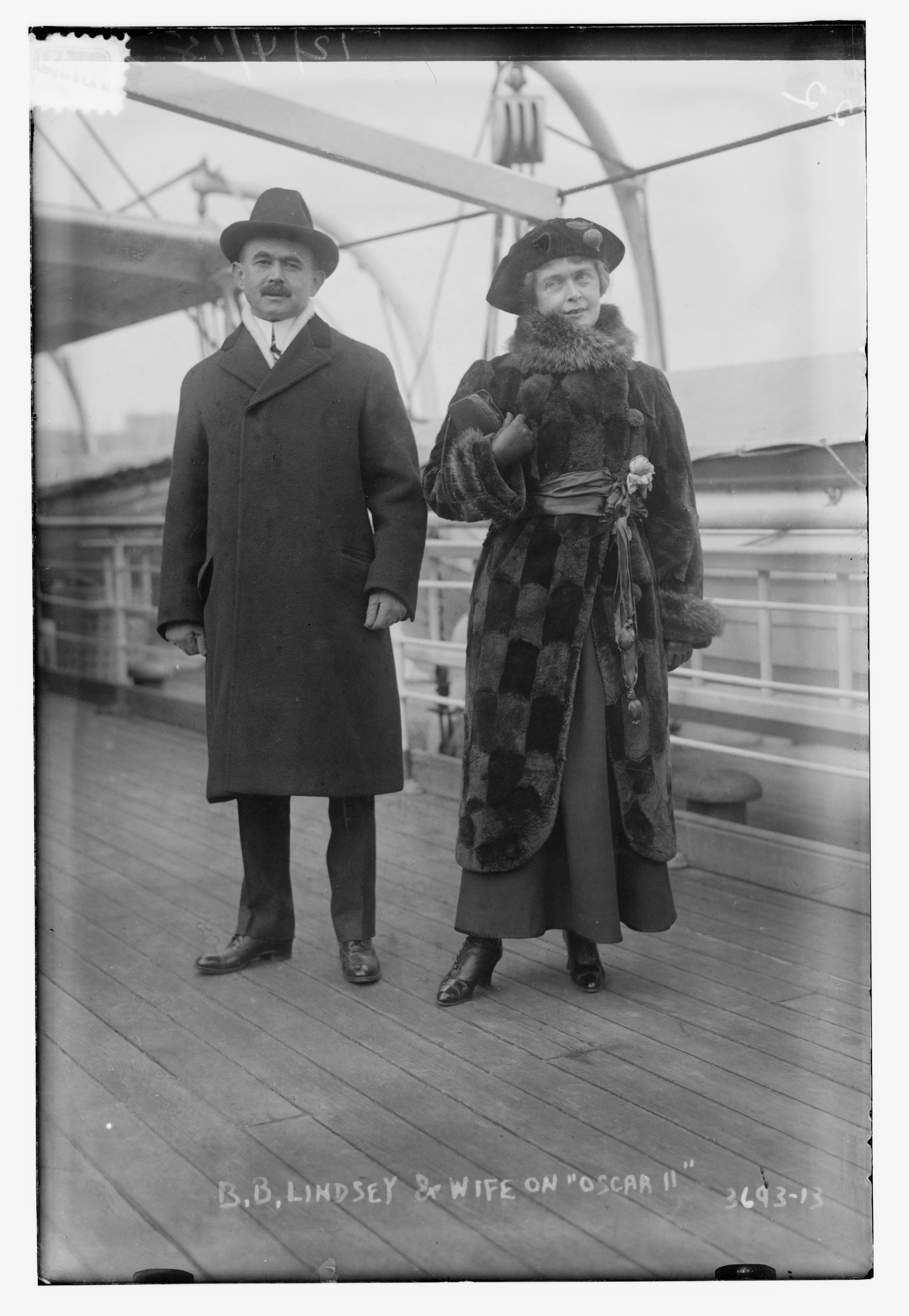
Lindsey and wife in 1915

Since one of the most common discourses in the popular culture was about women having children, and many clergy believed that sexual intercourse within marriage should only be for purposes of procreation, Lindsey's essay aroused strong emotions; a number of priests and ministers, as well as civic leaders accused him of promoting immorality, promiscuity and free love, charges that he denied. Pope Pius XI denounced companionate marriage. Bertrand Russell, in his 1929 book Marriage and Morals, wrote approvingly of Lindsey's proposals but observed that they "were received with a howl of horror by all middle-aged persons and most of the newspapers throughout the length and breadth of America." In Denver, he was ousted from the bench, after 28 years of service. Time expressed the view that his views on companionate marriage had destroyed his reputation. Lindsey continued to defend his views on radio and in a series of speaking engagements.

== In popular culture ==
In 1919, Lindsey wrote the introduction to Madeleine: An Autobiography, the memoirs of former prostitute Madeleine Blair, an exposé of brothels in the 19th-century American West.

Judge Lindsey appeared as himself in the film The Soul of Youth (1920), directed by William Desmond Taylor, and in Judge Ben Lindsey in the Juvenile Court (1921), the latter film made in the experimental Photokinema sound-on-disc process.

"Benjamin Barr Lindsey", episode 24 of the historical docudrama TV series Profiles in Courage, based upon John F. Kennedy's Pulitzer Prize-winning book, was broadcast on April 25, 1965, with George Grizzard portraying Lindsey in 1906, at the time of his advocacy for juvenile justice reform.

He is a recurring character in the songs of Denver folk/country artist Jay Munly, appearing in songs such as "Circle Round My Bedside" and "Bonnie Clyde, the Big Bull-Hen of the Women's Prison".

== Later years ==
In 1929, Lindsey was disbarred in Colorado for accepting money for legal services while serving as a judge. On December 7, 1930, he was arrested for disorderly conduct after disrupting public worship at the Cathedral of St. John the Divine in New York City. His interruption came after Bishop William T. Manning denounced Lindsey's stance on marriage in his sermon. In 1934, he ran for, and won election to a judgeship in the Los Angeles County Superior Court. He also continued his advocacy for children in the juvenile justice system. He died in Los Angeles, of a heart attack, at age 73.

== Works ==
- With Edwin Markham and George Creel, Children in Bondage, (1914)
- The Rule of Plutocracy in Colorado; The Doughboys' Religion (1919)
- Pan-Germanism in America (1919)
- With Wainwright Evans, The Revolt of Modern Youth (1925)
- With Wainwright Evans. The Companionate Marriage (1927)
- With Rube Burrough. The Dangerous Life (1931)
