= Madeline Blair =

American prostitute (born 1905)

Madeline Blair (born 1905) also known as Adelaide Andrews, Jackie or Blackie was an American prostitute from Bridgeport, Connecticut. She was known for being a stowaway aboard the United States Navy ship USS Arizona and plying her trade while on board the battleship. She is sometimes conflated with Madeleine Blair (note spelling), who was born in St. Louis and later became a brothel madam and activist in Chicago and Canada, and whose autobiography was published in 1919.

== USS Arizona ==
In March 1924, Arizona, part of the United States Fourth Fleet, was anchored in the North River off Manhattan. Some of the ship's sailors on shore leave met a 19-year-old prostitute named Madeline Blair. She was a brunette with dark eyes and went by the nickname "Blackie". She told them she wanted to go to Hollywood to become a star, but did not have enough money for the fare. Arizona was due to sail to California, and the sailors agreed to smuggle Blair onto the ship to get her there. She cut her hair short and the sailors provided her with a uniform cap and coat. In amongst a group of sailors and feigning drunkenness, she was smuggled aboard the ship. The sailors hid her in an unused generator compartment, and the cooks agreed to provide her with meals for $10 per day (a sailor's pay at the time was about $21 a month). She plied her trade at $3 a time.

As the ship sailed south and temperatures increased, Blair started to go up on deck when it was dark, usually wearing jeans and a work shirt. One evening while watching a movie from a searchlight platform, a sailor who did not know her and did not have a light for his cigarette, reached into her breast pocket (where sailors kept their matches), and discovered her breast. Although shocked, he did not raise the alarm. One sailor informed the ship's officers, but this was dismissed as absurd.

=== Discovery ===
After passing through the Panama Canal, on 12 April 1924, the ship was lying off Balboa, Panama, preparing to sail for California. At the break of dawn, Blair was still on deck. She stopped at a scuttlebutt to have a drink and was noticed by the chief radio operator, who recognised her as a woman and reported her to the deck officer. A search was mounted and Blair was apprehended. She refused to name the sailors who had smuggled her onto the ship. In an attempt to delay things until the ship sailed for California, she claimed there were other women aboard. A search of the ship found nothing and she was put ashore in Balboa.

The authorities in Balboa were unsure of what to do with her. She returned to New York on the Panama Railroad Company ship SS Cristobal. and had the US Navy billed for the fare.

=== Repercussions ===
The repercussions on the ship were severe. Captain Olmstead instigated courts-martial for 23 enlisted men, and sentences of up to 10 years imprisonment were imposed. Admiral Henry A. Wiley issued a letter of reprimand to all officers of the ship, including future Admiral and Chief of Naval Operations (CNO) Arleigh Burke, then an ensign. However, Admiral William V. Pratt thought the penalties excessive, and when he became CNO in 1930, he ordered the reprimands stricken from the officer's records. He could not reverse the results of the courts-martial of the enlisted men.

In 1928, Blair published her story in the American Weekly Magazine section of The San Francisco Examiner.
