= USS Arizona =

US Navy Pennsylvania-class battleship sunk in 1941

Coordinates: 21°21′53″N 157°57′00″W

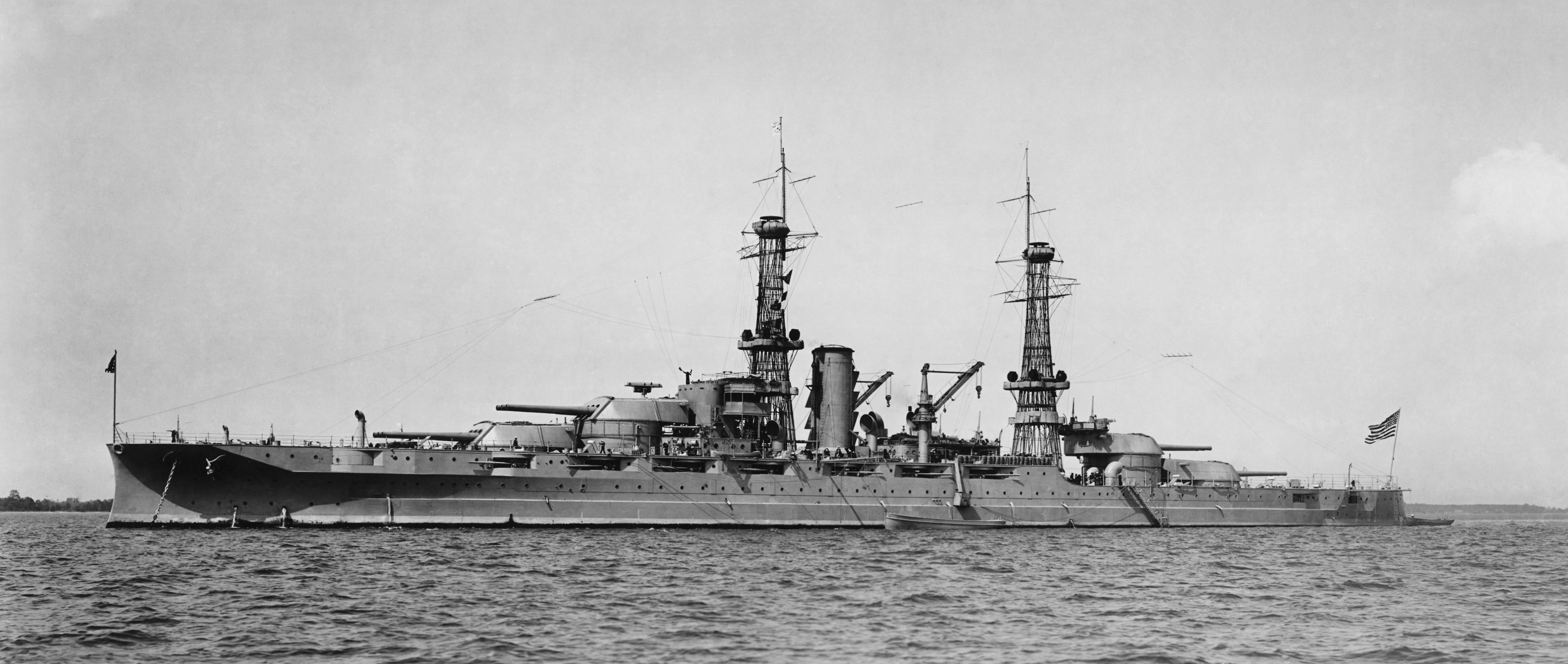
- Arizona during the 1920s

History

United States
- Name: Arizona
- Namesake: Arizona
- Ordered: 4 March 1913
- Builder: Brooklyn Navy Yard
- Laid down: 16 March 1914
- Launched: 19 June 1915
- Commissioned: 17 October 1916
- Decommissioned: 29 December 1941
- Stricken: 1 December 1942
- Identification: Hull number: BB-39
- Fate: Sunk during the attack on Pearl Harbor, 7 December 1941 by Japanese aircraft
- Status: Memorial wreck

General characteristics (as completed)
- Class & type: Pennsylvania-class battleship
- Displacement: 29,158 long tons (29,626 t) (standard)
- Length: 608 ft (185.3 m)
- Beam: 97 ft (29.6 m)
- Draft: 29 ft 3 in (8.9 m) (deep load)
- Installed power: 12 Babcock & Wilcox boilers; 33,376 shp (24,888 kW)
- Propulsion: 4 shafts; 4 sets of steam turbines
- Speed: 21 knots (39 km/h; 24 mph)
- Range: 8,000 nmi (15,000 km; 9,200 mi) at 10 knots (19 km/h; 12 mph)
- Complement: 1,087 (1,358 in 1931)
- Armament: 4 × triple 14 in (356 mm) guns; 22 × single 5 in (127 mm) guns; 4 × single 3 in (76 mm) AA guns; 2 × 21 in (533 mm) torpedo tubes
- Armor: Belt: 13.5–8 in (343–203 mm); Bulkheads: 13–8 in (330–203 mm); Barbettes: 13 in (330 mm); Turrets: 18 in (457 mm); Decks: 5 in (127 mm); Conning tower: 16–14 in (406–356 mm)

USS Arizona (hull number BB-39) was a Standard-type battleship built for the United States Navy in the mid-1910s. Named in honor of the 48th state, she was the second and last ship in the Pennsylvania class. After being commissioned in 1916, Arizona remained stateside during World War I but escorted President Woodrow Wilson to the subsequent Paris Peace Conference. The ship was deployed abroad again in 1919 to represent American interests during the Greco-Turkish War. Two years later, she was transferred to the Pacific Fleet, under which the ship would remain for the rest of her career.

The 1920s and 1930s saw Arizona regularly deployed for training exercises, including the annual Fleet Problems, excluding a comprehensive modernization between 1929 and 1931. The ship supported relief efforts in the wake of a 1933 earthquake near Long Beach, California, and was later filmed for a role in the 1934 James Cagney film Here Comes the Navy before budget cuts led to significant periods in port from 1936 to 1938. In April 1940, the Pacific Fleet's home port was moved from California to Pearl Harbor, Hawaii, as a deterrent to Japanese imperialism.

On 7 December 1941, the Japanese attacked Pearl Harbor, and Arizona was hit by several air-dropped armor-piercing bombs. One detonated an explosive-filled magazine, sinking the battleship and killing 1,177 of its officers and crewmen. Unlike many of the other ships attacked that day, Arizona was so irreparably damaged that it was not repaired for service in World War II. The shipwreck still lies at the bottom of Pearl Harbor beneath the USS Arizona Memorial. Dedicated to all those who died during the attack, the memorial is built across the ship's remains.

== Description ==
The Pennsylvania-class ships were significantly larger than their predecessors, the Nevada class. Arizona had an overall length of 608 feet (185.3 m), a beam of 97 feet (29.6 m) (at the waterline), and a draft of 29 feet 3 inches (8.9 m) at deep load. This was 25 feet (7.6 m) longer than the older ships. She displaced 29,158 long tons (29,626 t) at standard and 31,917 long tons (32,429 t) at deep load, over 4,000 long tons (4,060 t) more than the older ships. The ship had a metacentric height of 7.82 feet (2.4 m) at deep load. Her crew numbered 56 officers and 1,031 enlisted men as built.

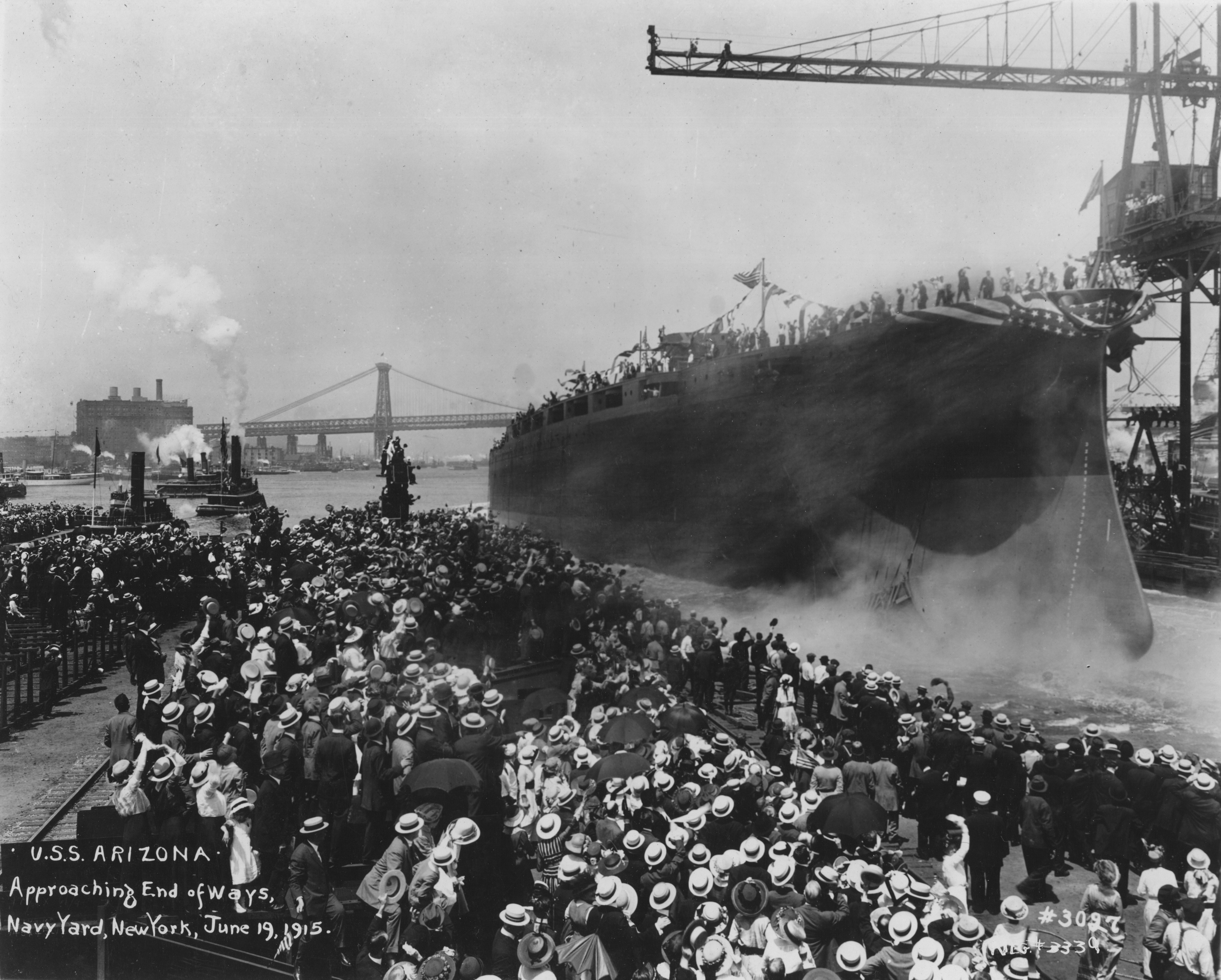
Arizona's launch, 19 June 1915

The ship had four direct-drive Parsons steam turbine sets, each of which drove a propeller 12 feet 1.5 inches (3.7 m) in diameter using steam provided by twelve Babcock & Wilcox boilers. The turbines were designed to produce a total of 34,000 shaft horsepower (25,000 kW), but achieved only 33,376 shp (24,888 kW) during Arizona's sea trials, when she met her designed speed of 21 knots (39 km/h; 24 mph). However, she did manage to reach 21.5 knots (39.8 km/h; 24.7 mph) during a full-power trial in September 1924. She was designed to carry enough fuel oil to steam at a speed of 12 knots (22 km/h; 14 mph) for 8,000 nautical miles (15,000 km; 9,200 mi) with a clean bottom. She had four 300-kilowatt (402 hp) turbo generators.

Arizona carried twelve 45-caliber 14-inch guns in triple gun turrets. The turrets were numbered from I to IV from front to rear. Defense against torpedo boats was provided by twenty-two 51-caliber 5-inch (127 mm) guns mounted in individual casemates in the sides of the ship's hull. Positioned as they were they proved vulnerable to sea spray and could not be worked in heavy seas. The ship mounted four 50-caliber 3-inch (76 mm) guns for anti-aircraft defense, although only two were fitted when completed. The other pair was added shortly afterwards on top of Turret III. Arizona also mounted two 21-inch (533 mm) torpedo tubes underwater, one on each broadside, and carried 24 torpedoes for them.

The Pennsylvania-class design continued the all-or-nothing principle of armoring only the most important areas of the ship begun in the Nevada class. The waterline armor belt of Krupp armor measured 13.5 inches (343 mm) thick and covered only the ship's machinery spaces and magazines. It had a total height of 17 feet 6 inches (5.3 m), of which 8 feet 9.75 inches (2.7 m) was below the waterline; beginning 2 feet 4 inches (0.7 m) below the waterline, the belt tapered to its minimum thickness of 8 inches (203 mm). The transverse bulkheads at each end of the ship ranged from 13 to 8 inches in thickness. The faces of the gun turrets were 18 inches (457 mm) thick while the sides were 9–10 inches (229–254 mm) thick and the turret roofs were protected by 5 inches (127 mm) of armor. The armor of the barbettes was 18 to 4.5 inches (457 to 114 mm) thick. The conning tower was protected by 16 inches (406 mm) of armor and had a roof eight inches thick.

The main armor deck was three plates thick with a total thickness of 3 inches; over the steering gear the armor increased to 6.25 inches (159 mm) in two plates. Beneath it was the splinter deck that ranged from 1.5 to 2 inches (38 to 51 mm) in thickness. The boiler uptakes were protected by a conical mantlet that ranged from 9 to 15 inches (230 to 380 mm) in thickness. A three-inch torpedo bulkhead was placed 9 feet 6 inches (2.9 m) inboard from the ship's side and the ship was provided with a complete double bottom. Testing in mid-1914 revealed that this system could withstand 300 pounds (140 kg) of TNT.

== Construction and trials ==
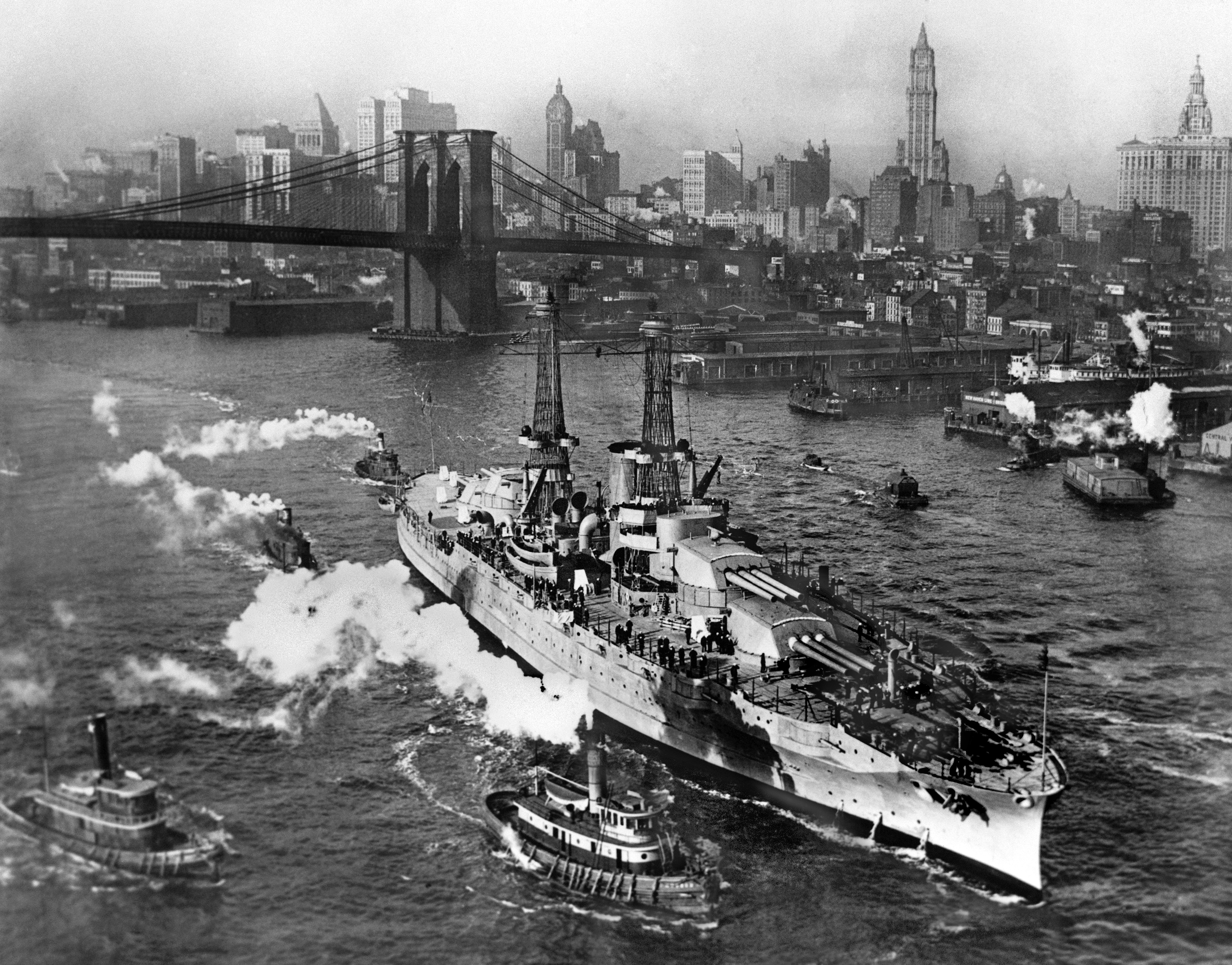
Arizona on the East River, New York City (1916)

The keel of battleship number 39 (hull number: BB-39) was laid on the morning of 16 March 1914 with Assistant Secretary of the Navy Franklin Delano Roosevelt in attendance. The builders intended to set a world-record ten months between the ship's keel-laying and launch, for what The New York Times declared would be "the world's biggest and most powerful, both offensively and defensively, superdreadnought [sic] ever constructed," but the ship was only a little over half complete a year later. She was launched on 19 June 1915, making it about fifteen months from keel-laying to launch. In the meantime, the ship was named after the newest state in the union by Secretary of the Navy Josephus Daniels.

The New York Times estimated that 75,000 people attended the launch, including John Purroy Mitchel, the mayor of New York City, George W. P. Hunt, the governor of Arizona, and many high-ranking military officials. Several warships were also nearby, including many of the new dreadnoughts which had already entered service (Florida, Utah, Wyoming, Arkansas, New York, and Texas). Esther Ross, the daughter of W. W. Ross of Prescott, Arizona, was given the honors of ship sponsor and christening. To acknowledge a ban on alcohol recently passed by the state legislature, the state's governor decided that two bottles would be used: one full of sparkling wine from Ohio, and another filled with water from the Roosevelt Dam. After the launch, Arizona was towed to the Brooklyn Navy Yard for fitting-out.

Arizona was commissioned into the Navy on 17 October 1916 with Captain John McDonald in command. She departed New York on 10 November 1916 after the crew had cleaned the ship and the propulsion system had been tested at the dock. After declinating the ship's magnetic compasses, the ship sailed south for her shakedown cruise. Outside Guantanamo Bay, a stripped turbine on 7 December forced the navy to order Arizona back to New York for repairs, although she was able to enter Chesapeake Bay to test her main and secondary gun batteries on 19–20 December. The turbine could not be repaired inside the ship, so the yard workers had to cut holes in the upper decks to lift the damaged casing out. It was reinstalled after almost four months of repairs at the naval yard.

== World War I ==
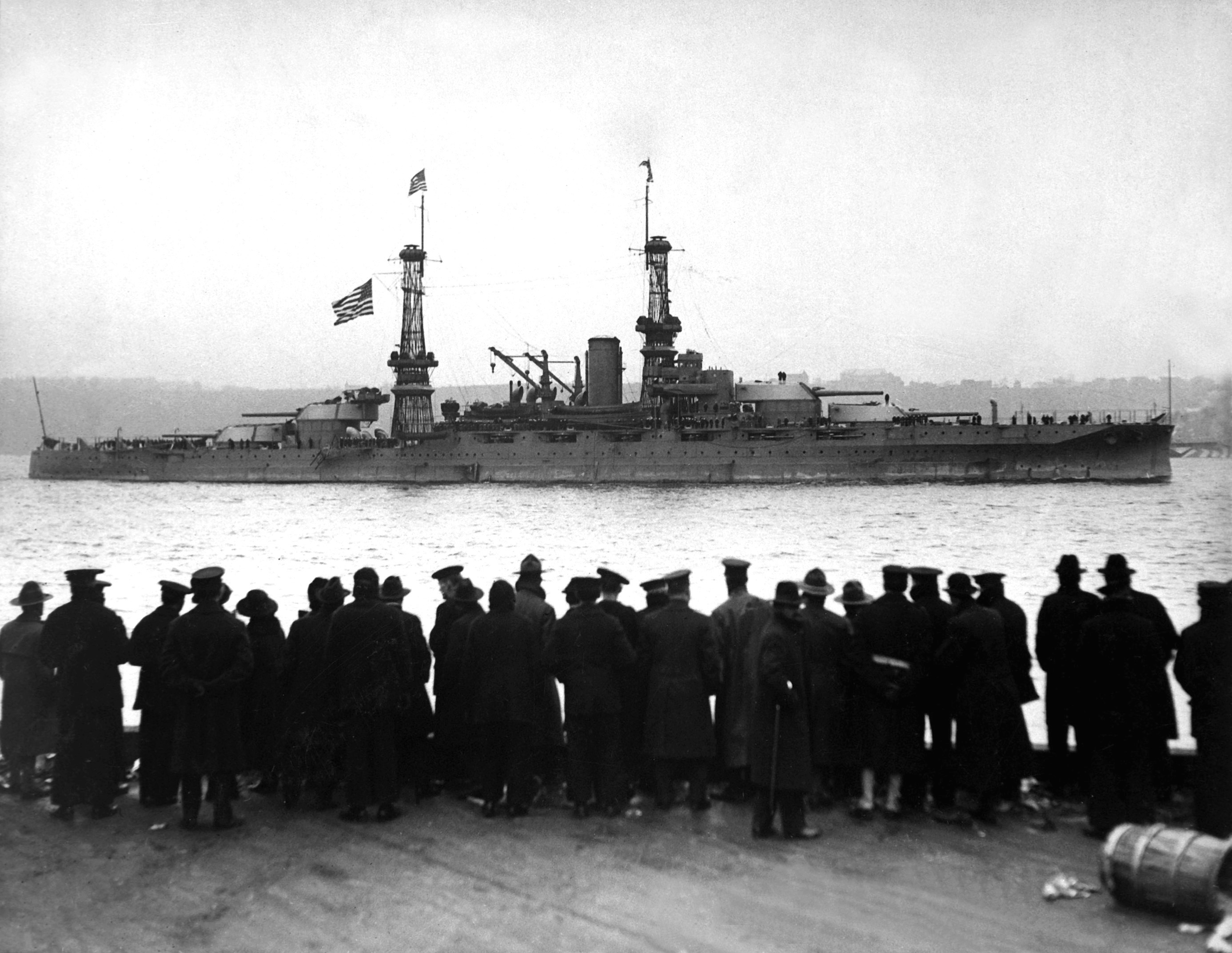
Arizona at the New York City naval review, leading ten dreadnoughts that paraded past Secretary of the Navy Josephus Daniels

Arizona left the yard on 3 April 1917, and three days later, the United States declared war on Germany. Assigned to Battleship Division 8 operating out of the York River, Arizona was employed only as a gunnery training ship for the crewmen on armed merchant vessels crossing the Atlantic in convoys. Shortly after the war began, eight of her 5-inch guns (the four guns farthest forward and the sternmost four guns) were removed to equip merchant ships. When the ship sailed near the wreck of the old San Marcos (ex-Texas), the wreck was sometimes used as a target for the 14-inch guns. Arizona rarely ventured into the ocean for fear of U-boats, and when she did, it was only in the company of other battleships and escort ships. Four coal-fired American dreadnoughts (it was easier to obtain coal than oil in the United Kingdom) were eventually sent across the Atlantic in December 1917 as Battleship Division Nine, but Arizona was not among them. Life for Arizona's crew was not all training, as the race-boat team from Arizona was able to win the Battenberg Cup in July 1918 by beating the team from Nevada by three lengths over the three-mile course.

The fighting ended on 11 November 1918 with an armistice. A week later, the ship left the United States for the United Kingdom, arriving on 30 November 1918. After two weeks berthed at Portland Harbor in Dorset, Arizona sailed for France. On 13 December 1918, Arizona joined nine battleships and twenty-eight destroyers escorting President Woodrow Wilson on the ocean liner George Washington into Brest for one day on Wilson's journey to the Paris Peace Conference. The ten battleships departed France the next day, taking less than two weeks to cross the Atlantic, and arrived in New York on 26 December to parades, celebrations, and a full naval review by Secretary Daniels. Arizona was the first in line and rendered a nineteen-gun salute to Daniels. Along with many of the other members of the recently returned fleet, she was anchored off New York City for the next several weeks and open to the public.

== Post-war and the 1920s ==
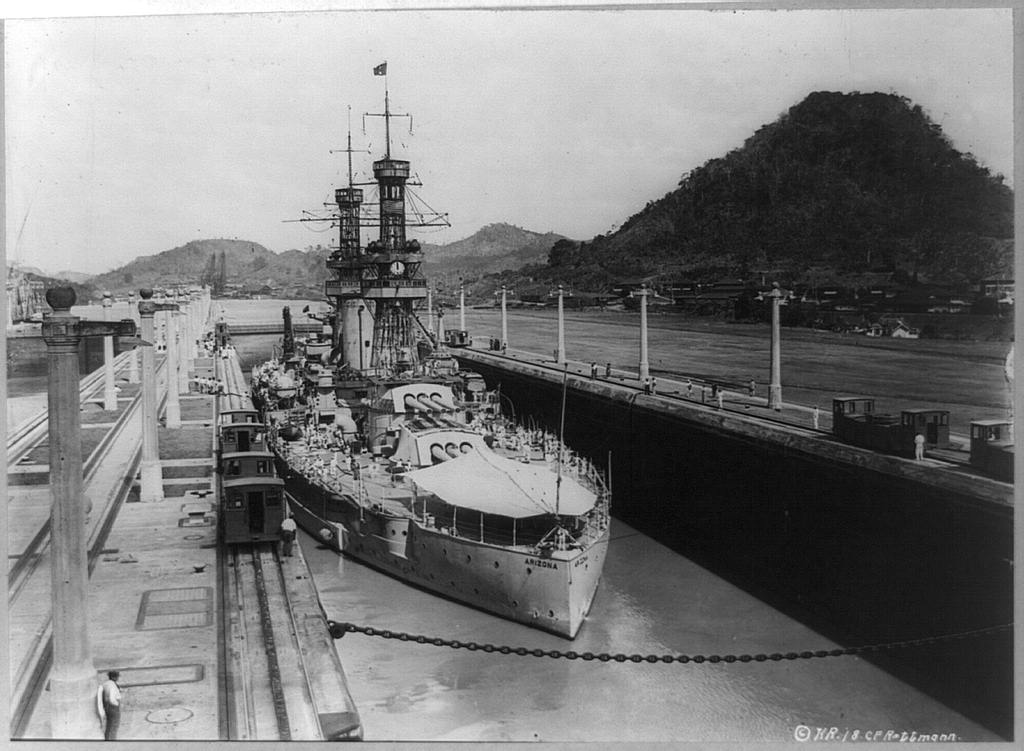
Arizona transits the Panama Canal in 1921.

Arizona sailed from New York for Hampton Roads on 22 January 1919; she continued south to Guantanamo Bay on 4 February and arrived on four days later. The time in Caribbean waters was mostly used in training for battles and fleet maneuvering, although it included a liberty visit to Port of Spain. In April, Arizona's crew won the Battenberg Cup rowing competition for the second straight year before the ship was deployed to France once again to escort President Wilson back to the United States. While the ship was awaiting Wilson's departure, she was redeployed to Smyrna (now İzmir) in Turkey in response to tensions between Greece and Italy over the awarding of Smyrna to Greece in the Paris Peace Treaty. The Greek and Italian governments had each deployed a major warship to the area (Georgios Averof and Duilio, respectively) to enforce their interests. Shortly after Arizona arrived, Greek ground forces arrived in transports and were off-loaded in the port. The resultant chaos in the city caused many American citizens in the area to seek shelter on board Arizona.

When the crisis abated, Arizona was ordered to Constantinople (now Istanbul) before she sailed for home on 15 June. She put into the New York Navy Yard on 30 June for an overhaul, where six 5-inch guns were removed and the fire control system was modernized. Work was completed in January 1920 and the battleship sailed south to Guantanamo Bay for crew training. During this time, Arizona was fitted with a flying-off platform similar to the one given to Texas in March 1919. In April, Arizona lost the Battenberg Cup to Nevada, and in June she was present for the Naval Academy's graduation ceremonies. In August she became the flagship of Battleship Division Seven, although it was only later in 1920 that the battleship was refitted to be an admiral's flagship.

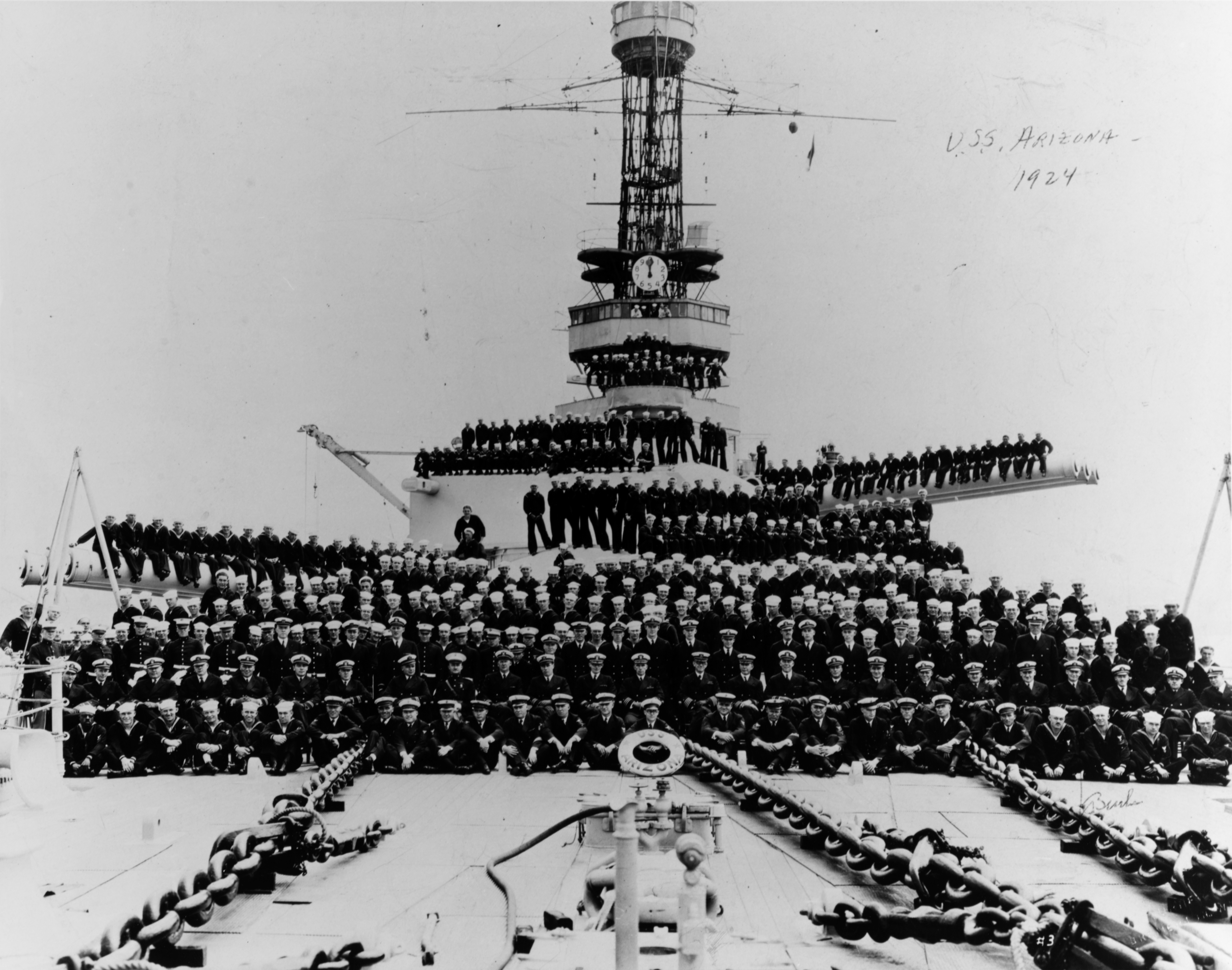
Arizona with ship's complement (1924)

In company with six battleships and eighteen destroyers, Arizona was sent south again to transit the Panama Canal in January 1921. After meeting up with the Pacific Fleet, Arizona continued on to Peru for a week before the two fleets combined to practice battle maneuvers. After a short return to the Atlantic, which included an overhaul in New York, Arizona, under the command of Jehu V. Chase, returned to Peru in the summer before she began operating from her new home port of San Pedro, Los Angeles, part of Los Angeles, where she was based until 1940.

For the rest of the 1920s, Arizona's service consisted of routine training exercises. Naval historian Paul Stillwell remarked that "the Pacific years included a great deal of sameness and repetition", and his chronology of the ship's movements is filled with phrases like "torpedo-defense practice", "battle-practice rehearsal", "gunnery practice", "en route to…", and "anchored at…". A recurring theme in these years were the annual Fleet Problems, which began in 1923 and simulated large fleet actions by having most of the active fleet face off against each other. The first two simulated an attack on the Panama Canal from the west, while in 1925 they attempted to defend the Hawaiian Islands. Other 1920s Fleet Problems included the Caribbean, near Central America, the West Indies, and Hawaii. On 27 July 1923 the ship, under command of John Y.R. Blakely, joined President Warren G. Harding's naval review in Seattle. Harding died just one week later, and Arizona joined the Pacific Fleet to fire a salute in his honor on 3 August.

Sometime in early March 1924 a prostitute named Madeline Blair stowed away aboard Arizona, trading sex for a free voyage to San Pedro until she was discovered on 12 April while the ship was anchored in Balboa, Panama. She was sent back to New York City and Captain Percy Olmstead later convened courts-martial for 23 sailors once the ship began her refit in the Bremerton Navy Yard, which imposed sentences of up to 10 years imprisonment. Admiral Henry A. Wiley, commander of the Battle Fleet, issued a letter of reprimand to all officers of the ship, including future Admiral and Chief of Naval Operations Arleigh Burke, then an ensign. Admiral William V. Pratt, then in command of the division to which Arizona was assigned, thought the penalties excessive, and he ordered the reprimands stricken from the officer's records when he became Chief of Naval Operations in 1930.

== Modernization ==
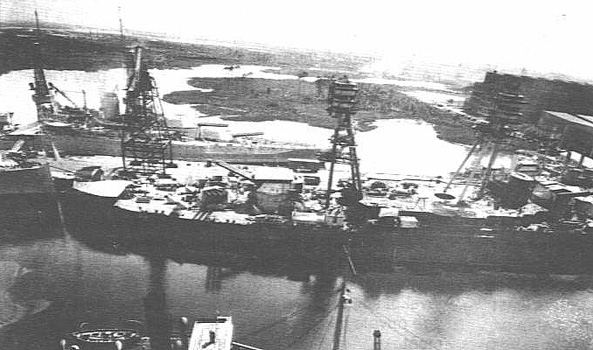
Arizona being modernized in Norfolk, June 1930

Four months after Fleet Problem IX in January 1929, Arizona was modernized at the Norfolk Navy Yard. New tripod masts, surmounted by three-tiered fire-control directors for the main and secondary armament, replaced the old hyperboloid design of cage masts; the number of five-inch guns was reduced to 12 and the guns repositioned one deck higher, and eight 25-caliber five-inch anti-aircraft guns replaced the three-inch guns with which she had originally been equipped. These changes increased her crew to 92 officers and 1,639 enlisted men. The ship's main gun turrets were modified to increase the maximum elevation of their guns to 30°. The compressed-air catapult on the quarterdeck was replaced by one that used black powder. Her deck armor was increased by the addition of a 1.75-inch (44 mm) thickness of Special Treatment Steel, and the ship was bulged to protect her from torpedoes. An additional bulkhead was added to the sides of the boiler rooms for the same purpose. At the same stroke, her own outfit of two submerged torpedo tubes was removed during this refit in light of a new appreciation that anticipated battleship engagement ranges made their future use improbable. This alteration also permitted the large transverse flat in which the tubes had been situated to be subdivided to reduce risks of flooding in action. Arizona's machinery was almost entirely replaced; her high-pressure turbines were replaced by more powerful geared turbines from the canceled battleship Washington, and six new boilers replaced her originals. Their additional power offset the ship's increased displacement as demonstrated during her sea trials; Arizona made 20.7 knots (38.3 km/h; 23.8 mph) with 35,081 shp (26,160 kW) at a displacement of 37,654 long tons (38,258 t).

== 1930s ==
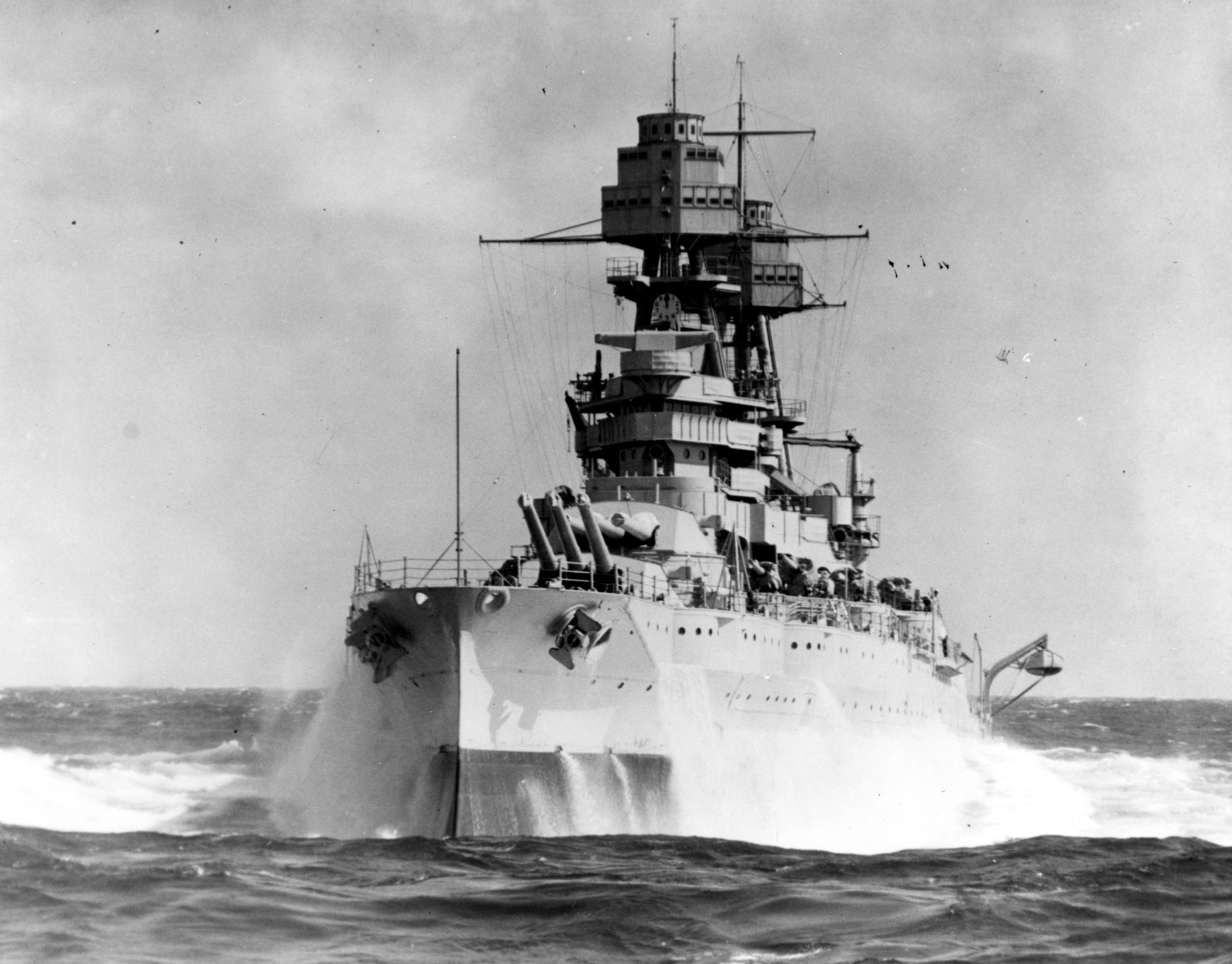
Arizona after her modernization during the 1930s

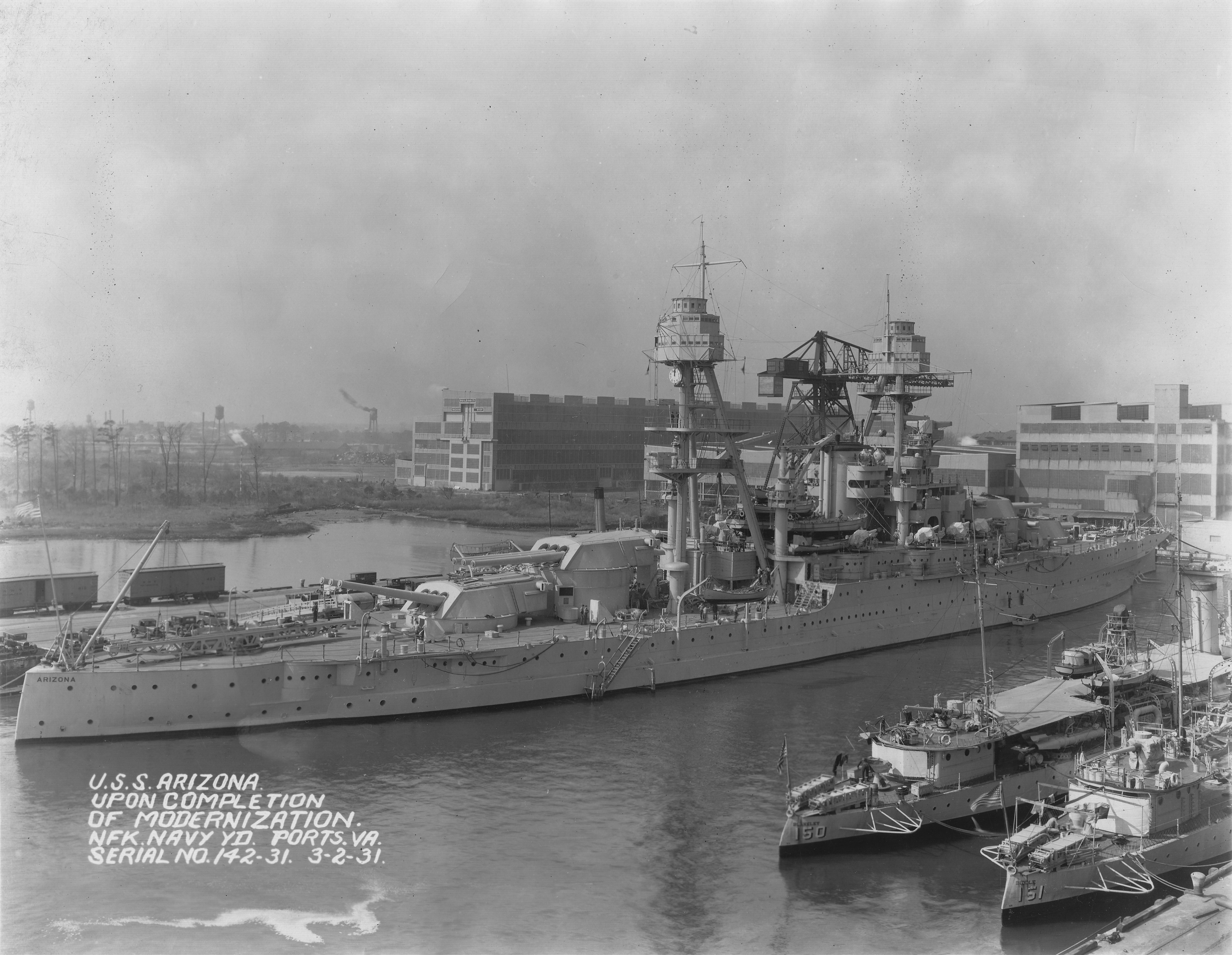
Arizona in 1931 after her modernization

On 19 March 1931, even before Arizona was put through post-modernization sea trials, she hosted President Herbert Hoover for a brief vacation in the Caribbean. The President visited Puerto Rico and the Virgin Islands. Returning on 29 March, Arizona conducted her sea trials at Rockland, Maine, and had another catapult fitted on the top of Turret III, before she was transferred to the West Coast in August with her sister Pennsylvania. In February 1932, the ship participated in Grand Joint Exercise No. 4 in which carrier aircraft successfully attacked Pearl Harbor on Sunday morning, 7 February. After returning to the West Coast from Fleet Problem XIV in 1933, the ship was anchored in San Pedro when an earthquake struck nearby Long Beach, California, on 10 March. Sailors from the ship joined the relief efforts, providing food, treating the injured, and providing security from looters.

In early 1934, the ship and her crew were filmed for the James Cagney/Warner Brothers film Here Comes the Navy, which made extensive use of exterior footage as well as on-board location shots. In the early morning of 26 July, Arizona collided with a fishing trawler, Umatilla, that was under tow by another trawler off Cape Flattery. Two men aboard Umatilla were killed in the collision and the Navy convened a Court of Inquiry to investigate the incident. The court recommended that the ship's captain, Captain MacGillivray Milne, be court-martialed. This took place at Guantanamo Bay Naval Base, Cuba, while the ship was participating in that year's Fleet Problem off the East Coast. Milne was judged guilty and replaced several months later by Captain George Baum after the ship returned to the West Coast. In the meantime, Rear Admiral Samuel W. Bryant assumed command of Battleship Division Two on 4 September, with Arizona as his flagship.

Rear Admiral George T. Pettengill relieved Bryant on 4 March 1935 and the ship participated in Fleet Problem XVI two months later. Arizona made a port visit to Balboa in May 1936 during Fleet Problem XVII. On 8 June, Captain George A. Alexander relieved Baum as captain, and, 15 days later, Rear Admiral Claude C. Bloch relieved Pettengill. During gunnery practice on 24 July, the combustion gases from one gun of Turret II entered the gun turret, burning one crewman. The turret's sprinkling system was turned on to prevent any powder explosion, but the released water leaked into the turret's electrical switchboard and started a small fire that was easily put out. Due to the navy's limited budget, the ship spent most of this period in port as a fuel-saving measure. In Fiscal Year 1936–37, the ship was anchored for 267 days; the following year it was in port for 255 days. The ship spent the rest of her career based on the West Coast or in Hawaii.

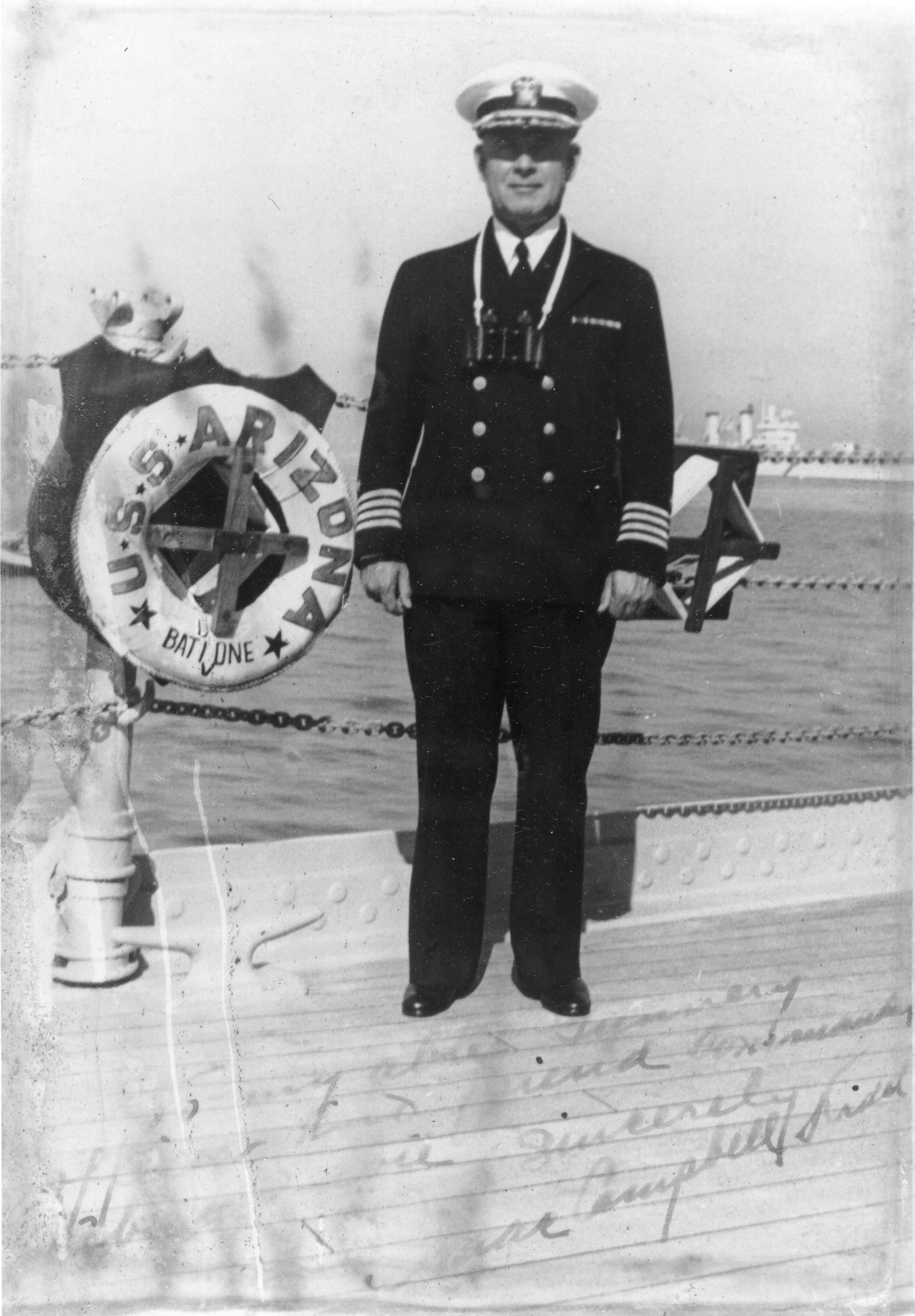
Captain Isaac C. Kidd on the deck of Arizona, c. 1939

On 2 January 1937, Rear Admiral John Greenslade assumed command of Battleship Division Two from Bloch and transferred his flag to the battleship Maryland on 13 April. Rear Admiral Manley H. Simons, commander of Battleship Division One, transferred his flag to Arizona on 7 August. He was relieved by Rear Admiral Adolphus E. Watson on 8 November. Captain Alfred Winsor Brown relieved Baum on 11 December. The ship participated in Fleet Problem XIX off Hawaii in April–May 1938. Captain Brown died in his sleep on 7 September and Captain Isaac C. Kidd assumed command of the ship on 17 September 1938. That same day, Rear Admiral Chester Nimitz assumed command of Battleship Division One. Nimitz was relieved on 27 May 1939 by Rear Admiral Russell Willson. Captain Harold C. Train assumed command of the ship on 5 February 1940.

Arizona's last fleet problem was off Hawaii in April–May 1940. At its conclusion, the United States Pacific Fleet was retained in Hawaiian waters, based at Pearl Harbor, to deter the Japanese. She was overhauled at the Puget Sound Navy Yard, Bremerton, Washington, from October 1940 to January 1941. During this refit, the foundation for a search radar was added atop her foremast, her anti-aircraft directors were upgraded and a platform for four water-cooled .50-inch (12.7 mm) caliber M2 Browning machine guns was installed at the very top of the mainmast. Her last flag change-of-command occurred on 23 January 1941, when Willson was relieved by Isaac Kidd, by that time a rear admiral.

Captain Franklin Van Valkenburgh relieved Train on 5 February 1941. On 22 October 1941, during an exercise taking place in heavy fog, the ship was hit in the bow by the Oklahoma. Arizona had been scheduled to depart for Bremerton Navy Yard in November to undergo an overhaul. The accident instead required her to be dry-docked at Pearl Harbor for repairs to the collision damage. As a result, she remained in Hawaii. The ship's last sortie was a night-firing exercise on the night of 4 December as part of Battleship Division One, alongside Nevada and Oklahoma. All three ships moored at quays along Ford Island on the following day. On 6 December, the repair ship Vestal came alongside to assist the ship's crew with minor repairs.

== Attack on Pearl Harbor ==
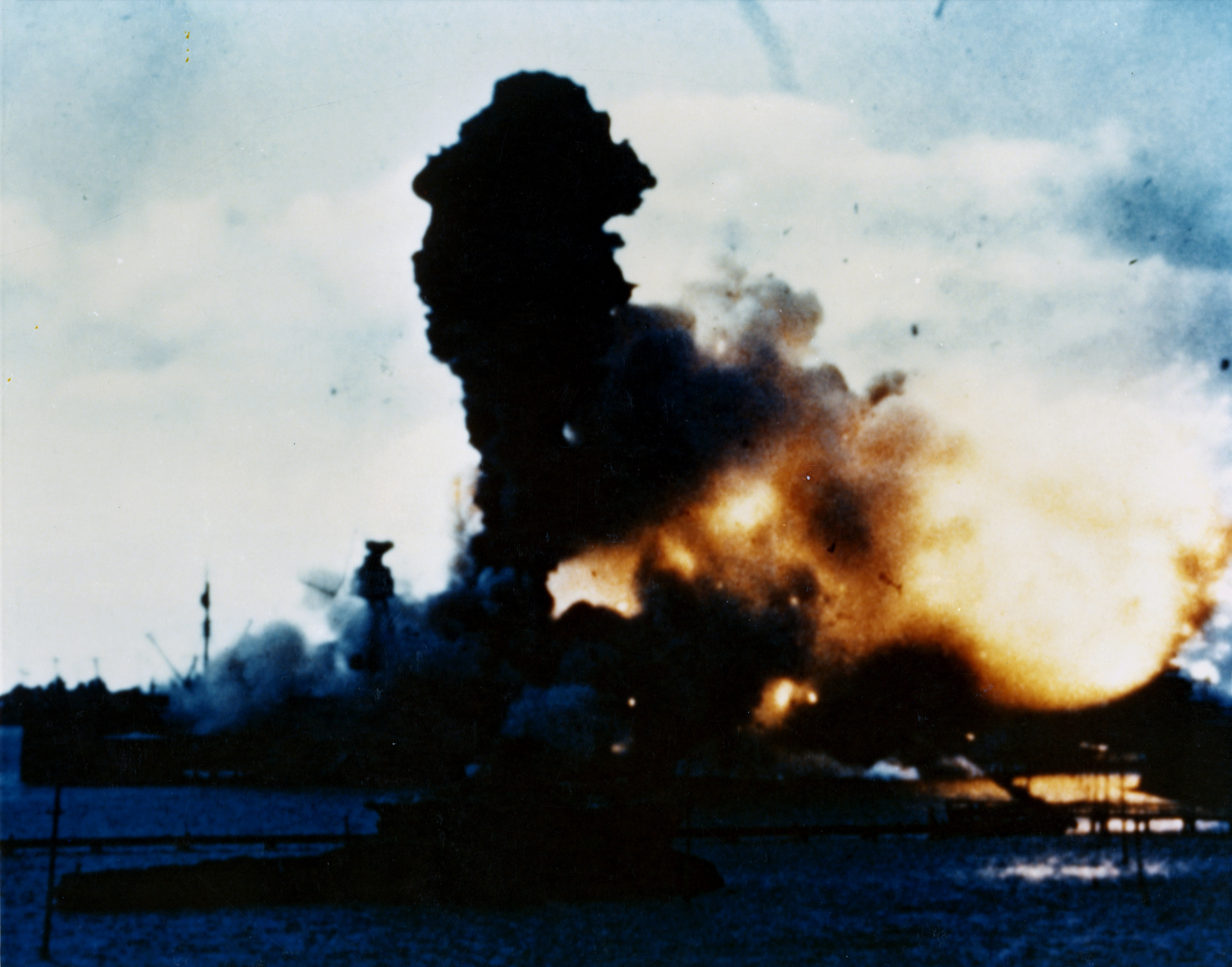
Arizona's forward magazines explode in a still from a film made during the Japanese attack.

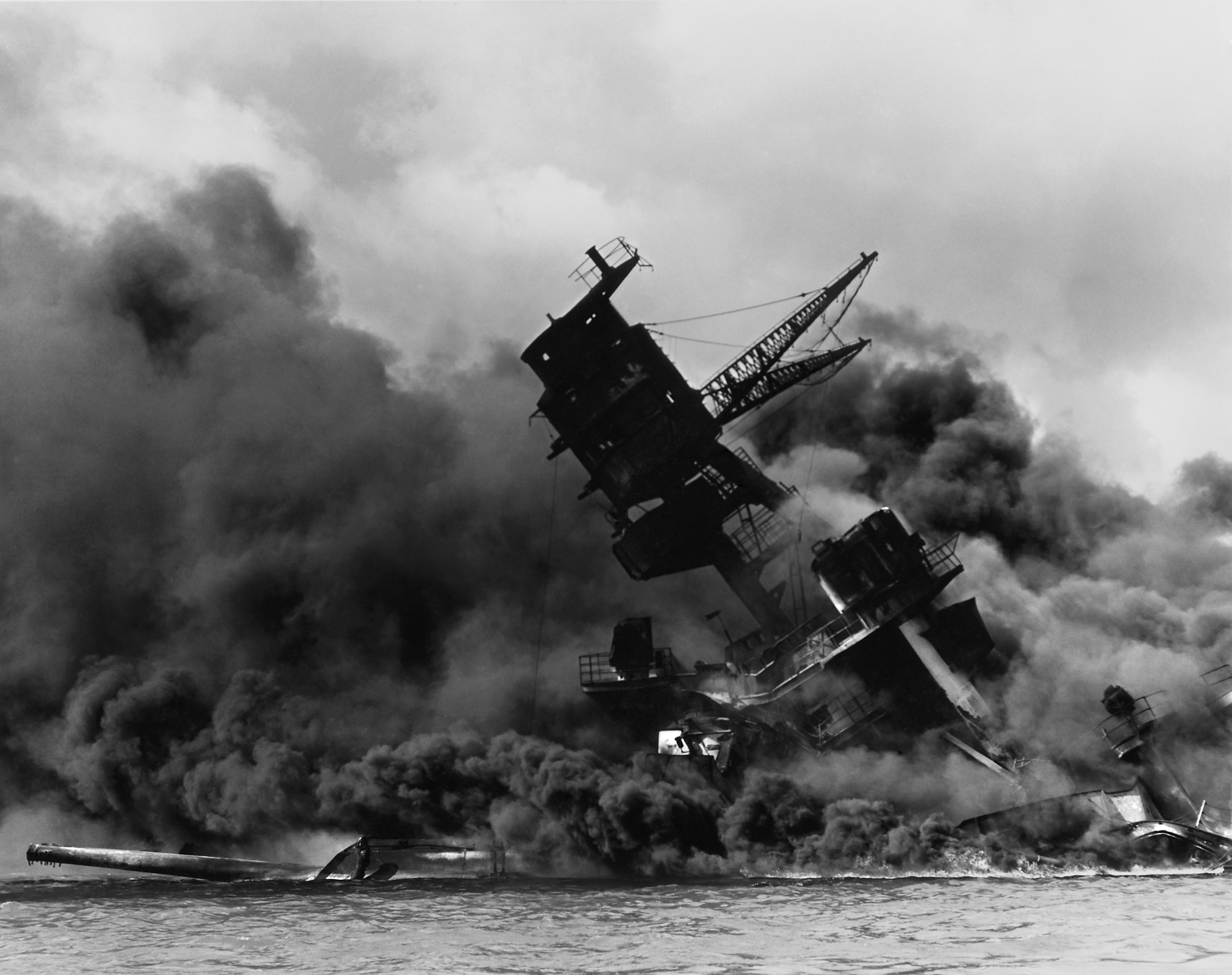
The sunken Arizona's forward mast

Shortly before 08:00 local time on 7 December 1941, Japanese aircraft from six aircraft carriers struck the Pacific Fleet as it lay in port at Pearl Harbor, and wreaked devastation on the warships and installations defending Hawaii. On board Arizona, the ship's air raid alarm went off at about 07:55, and the ship went to general quarters soon after. Shortly after 08:00, ten Nakajima B5N2 "Kate" torpedo bombers, five each from the carriers Kaga and Hiryū, attacked Arizona. All of the aircraft were carrying 41-centimeter (16.1 in) armor-piercing shells modified into 797-kilogram (1,757 lb) bombs. Flying at an estimated altitude of 3,000 meters (9,800 ft), Kaga's aircraft bombed Arizona from amidships to stern. Soon after, Hiryū's bombers hit the bow area.

The aircraft scored four hits and three near-misses on and around Arizona. The near-miss off the port bow is thought to have caused observers to believe that the ship had been torpedoed, although no torpedo damage has been found. The stern-most bomb ricocheted off the face of Turret IV and penetrated the deck to detonate in the captain's pantry, causing a small fire. The next forward-most hit was near the port edge of the ship, abreast the mainmast, probably detonating in the area of the anti-torpedo bulkhead. The next bomb struck near the port rear 5-inch AA gun. (Note: The preliminary damage report, filed on 28 January 1942, listed seven bomb hits as well as one torpedo hit on the port bow forward. This last hit was based on a report from the captain of the repair ship Vestal moored alongside and could not be verified at the time. One bomb was thought to have gone down the stack, but this was contradicted when the ship's superstructure was salvaged in 1942 and the funnel cap was found to be intact.)

=== Magazine explosion ===
The last bomb hit at 08:06 in the vicinity of Turret II, likely penetrating the armored deck near the magazines located in the forward section of the ship. While not enough of the ship is intact to judge the exact location, its effects are indisputable: about seven seconds after the hit, the forward magazines detonated in a cataclysmic explosion, mostly venting through the sides of the ship and destroying much of the interior structure of the forward part of the ship. This caused the forward turrets and conning tower to collapse downward some 25–30 feet (7.6–9.1 m) and the foremast and funnel to collapse forward, effectively tearing the ship in two. The explosion touched off fierce fires that burned for two days; debris showered down on Ford Island in the vicinity. The blast from this explosion also put out fires on the repair ship Vestal, which was moored alongside. The bombs and subsequent explosion killed 1,177 of the 1,512 crewmen on board at the time, approximately half of the lives lost during the attack.

Two competing hypotheses have arisen about the cause of the explosion. The first is that the bomb detonated in or near the black-powder magazine used for the ship's saluting guns and catapult charges. This would have detonated first and then ignited the smokeless powder magazines which were used for the ship's main armament. A 1944 Navy Bureau of Ships report suggests that a hatch leading to the black powder magazine was left open, possibly with flammable materials stocked nearby. The Naval History and Heritage Command explained that black powder might have been stockpiled outside the armored magazine. The alternative explanation is that the bomb penetrated the armored decks and detonated directly inside one of the starboard magazines for the main armament, but smokeless powder is relatively difficult to detonate. Thus the 14-inch powder bags required a black powder pad to quickly ignite the powder. The time elapsed from the bomb hit to the magazine explosion was shorter than experience suggested burning smokeless powder required to explode. It seems unlikely that a definitive answer to this question will ever be found, as the surviving physical evidence is insufficient to determine the cause of the magazine explosion.

=== Awards and recognition ===
After the attack, several sailors received medals for their conduct and actions under fire. Lieutenant Commander Samuel G. Fuqua, the ship's damage control officer, earned the Medal of Honor for his cool-headedness while quelling fires and getting survivors off the wrecked battleship. Posthumous awards of the Medal of Honor also went to two high-ranking officers who were on board the battleship when it was destroyed: Rear Admiral Kidd, the first flag officer killed in the Pacific war, and Captain Van Valkenburgh, who reached the bridge and was attempting to defend his ship when the bomb that hit the onboard ammunition magazines destroyed it. Arizona was awarded one battle star for her service in World War II.

== Salvage and memorial ==
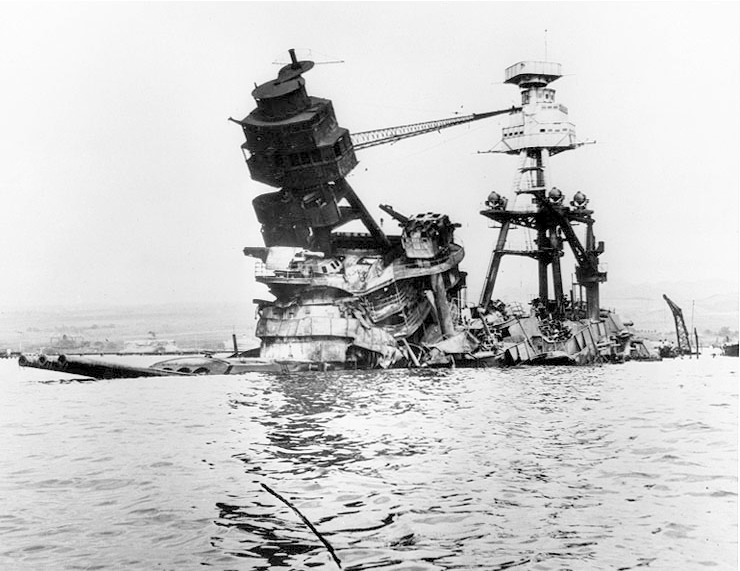
The visible superstructure of Arizona after her sinking

Arizona was placed "in ordinary" (declared to be temporarily out of service) at Pearl Harbor on 29 December 1941, and was stricken from the Naval Vessel Register on 1 December 1942. She was so badly damaged by the magazine explosion that she was not thought fit for service even if she could be salvaged, unlike many of the other sunken ships nearby. Her surviving superstructure was scrapped in 1942, and her main armament was salvaged over the next year and a half. The aft main gun turrets were removed and reinstalled as United States Army Coast Artillery Corps Battery Arizona at Kahe Point on the west coast of Oahu and Battery Pennsylvania on the Mokapu Peninsula, covering Kaneohe Bay at what is now Marine Corps Base Hawaii. Battery Pennsylvania fired its guns for the first and last time on V-J Day in August 1945 while training, while the nearby Battery Arizona was never completed. Both forward turrets were left in place, although the guns from Turret II were salvaged and later installed on Nevada in the fall of 1944 after having been straightened and relined. Nevada later fired these same guns against the Japanese islands of Okinawa and Iwo Jima.

=== Arizona memorials ===
It is commonly—but incorrectly—believed that Arizona remains perpetually in commission, like the USS Constitution. Arizona is under the control of the National Park Service, but the US Navy still retains the title. Arizona retains the right, in perpetuity, to fly the United States flag as if she were an active, commissioned naval vessel.

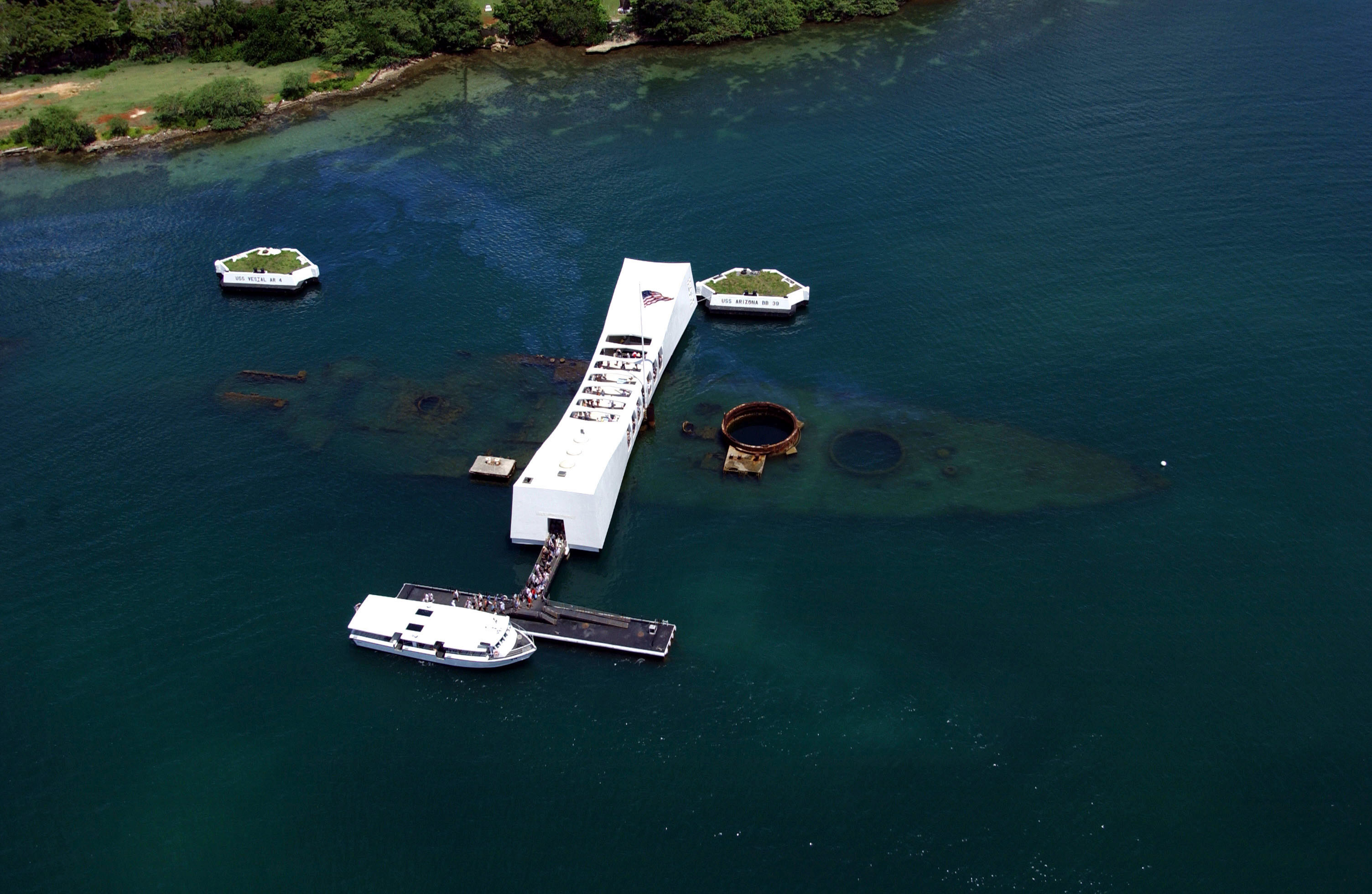
Aerial view of the USS Arizona Memorial, showing the wreck and oil seepage from the ship's bunkers

The wreck of Arizona remains at Pearl Harbor to commemorate the men of her crew lost that December morning in 1941. On 7 March 1950, Admiral Arthur W. Radford, commander in chief of the Pacific Fleet at that time, instituted the raising of colors over her remains. Legislation during the administrations of presidents Dwight D. Eisenhower and John F. Kennedy resulted in the designation of the wreck as a national shrine in 1962. A memorial was built across the ship's sunken remains, including a shrine room listing the names of the lost crew members on a marble wall. The national memorial was administratively listed on the National Register of Historic Places on 15 October 1966. The ship herself was designated a National Historic Landmark on 5 May 1989. Upon their death, survivors of the attack were able to have their ashes placed within the ship among their fallen comrades. Veterans who served aboard the ship at other times had the choice of scattering their ashes in the water above the ship. The last survivor of Arizona, Lou Conter, died in April 2024 at the age of 102.

While the superstructure and two of the four main gun turrets were removed, the barbette of one of the turrets remains visible above the water. Since her sinking, oil still leaks from the hull, with more than 2.3 U.S. quarts (2.2 liters) escaping into the harbor per day. In 2004, the US Navy and the National Park Service oversaw a comprehensive computerized mapping of the hull, being careful to honor its role as a war grave. The Navy considered non-intrusive means of abating the continued leakage of oil to avoid the further environmental degradation of the harbor.

One of the original Arizona bells now hangs in the University of Arizona Student Union Memorial Center bell tower. The bell was rung after every home football victory over any team except other Arizona schools. As of 2020, the bell is no longer rung due to the risk of damaging it. A gun, mast, and anchor from Arizona are in Wesley Bolin Memorial Plaza just east of the Arizona State Capitol complex in downtown Phoenix, Arizona. The gun's plaque states that it was not on the ship during the Pearl Harbor attack, but was being relined for mounting on the battleship Nevada. It is paired with a gun from the battleship Missouri to represent the start and end of the Pacific War for the United States. Other artifacts from the ship, such as items from the ship's silver service, are on permanent exhibit in the Arizona State Capitol Museum.

Every two years the Navy awards "The USS Arizona Memorial Trophy" to a ship that has achieved the highest combat readiness in Strike warfare, Surface Fire Support and Anti-Surface warfare, as determined by the Chief of Naval Operations. The three-foot-tall (90 cm) bronze trophy on a black marble base was provided to the Navy by the citizens of the state of Arizona on 7 December 1987.

== See also ==
- USS Arizona salvaged artifacts
- USS Texas, the only extant WWI-era US Navy battleship remaining
- HMS Royal Oak, another battleship sunk in harbor by a surprise attack and now a war grave
