= Madeleine Blair =

American sex worker and author

Madeleine Blair (pseudonym) was a sex worker who lived and worked in the late nineteenth and early twentieth century in the Midwestern and Western United States as well as Canada. Her autobiography, Madeleine: an autobiography, which tells the story of her life and work as a prostitute, was published by Harper & Brothers Publishers in 1919.

== Early life ==
=== Childhood ===
As Madeleine published her autobiography using a pseudonym, her real identity has never been uncovered. Therefore, both her date of birth and the exact origins of her family cannot be ascertained. She was a third generation American, whose parents moved from the Atlantic seaboard to settle in "a thriving town of the Middle West." While never naming the specific location of her childhood, Madeleine describes it in her autobiography as a "new and crude" town, with few opportunities. She was the second eldest child of a large family, and her father was a well-respected member of the community. Madeleine's upbringing was in line with that of an upper-class child; her family employed a laundress and a cook. She had access to education and a wide variety of literature, and proved at a young age to have both an appetite and a talent for learning. Her parents were also religious, and she was raised with a "strict heaven and hell belief," which strongly influenced her throughout the rest of her life.

=== Worsening conditions ===
However, the happy childhood that Madeleine describes in her autobiography did not last. The first disruption was an incident in which her father discovered her playing with the laundress's son. He became enraged and attacked both her and the other child before being stopped by Madeleine's mother. Madeleine soon learned from the family's cook that her father was an alcoholic who had been drinking for the past two years and that, despite her mother's efforts to hide his alcoholism, his condition had steadily been worsening. After this initial incident, Madeleine's father continued to beat her. Eventually, he sold his business and left the family for several months. When he returned, the family's home was sold under mortgage and they subsequently moved into a small house in a poor neighborhood.

After this move, Madeleine's father lost his job and left once again to find work in a pattern that would continue throughout Madeleine's adolescence. Madeleine's older brother left school and began working to support the family in their father's absence. That fall, Madeleine herself turned thirteen, but as there was no demand for child labor in their town she was unable to help her brother in supporting the family. Madeleine recalls the winter following her thirteenth birthday as one of the worst of her life. Her family could not afford to continue to send her to school, and a new baby only added increased strain to the household. The family was regularly cold and hungry, and Madeleine describes that "at regular intervals father came home, drunk and demoniacal, to sober up, repent, and become again that courteous gentleman, the kindly parent, the loving husband of his brief sober periods." In spring, the family's situation worsened further as they were forced to move to the worst neighborhood in town. The neighboring women, while ostensibly employed in other businesses, worked additionally as prostitutes. These women became Madeleine's only companions throughout her teenage years as she and her older brother never returned to school. With her mother preoccupied with the younger children, her brother working, and her father often absent, Madeleine began to be propositioned by her father's previous friends. When she was seventeen, she had sex for the first time, which remained a deep source of shame throughout her life.

Shortly after Madeleine had turned seventeen, her family received a letter from a former servant, Mrs. James, who had married and was living in St. Louis. The woman suggested that Madeleine come to St. Louis to live with her and work in a factory, and she offered to pay for the travel expenses and take care of the girl. At this point, Madeleine's family had not heard from her father in nearly a year. She and her mother agreed that the move St. Louis would be in the best interest of both Madeleine and her family, who were at this point being supported exclusively by Madeleine's older brother, and Madeleine said a painful goodbye to her family soon after.

== St. Louis ==
=== Arrival ===
Upon arriving in St. Louis, Madeleine began boarding with Mrs. James, who found her work as a check-girl at a factory where Mrs. James was the forewoman. Although Madeleine was adept at the job, she struggled to fit in socially with the girls who boarded and worked with her in St. Louis. After about two months in the city she became sick, and when her health worsened to the point that she was unable to work. Mrs. James took Madeleine to a physician, where they discovered that the girl was pregnant. Madeleine, deeply ashamed, admitted to Mrs. James that she had had sex. The two decided that they would keep the pregnancy a secret from Madeleine's mother, and although Mrs. James was sympathetic and insisted that no man would have taken advantage of Madeleine if her father had been there to protect her, Madeleine resolved to run away in order to bear her disgrace alone.

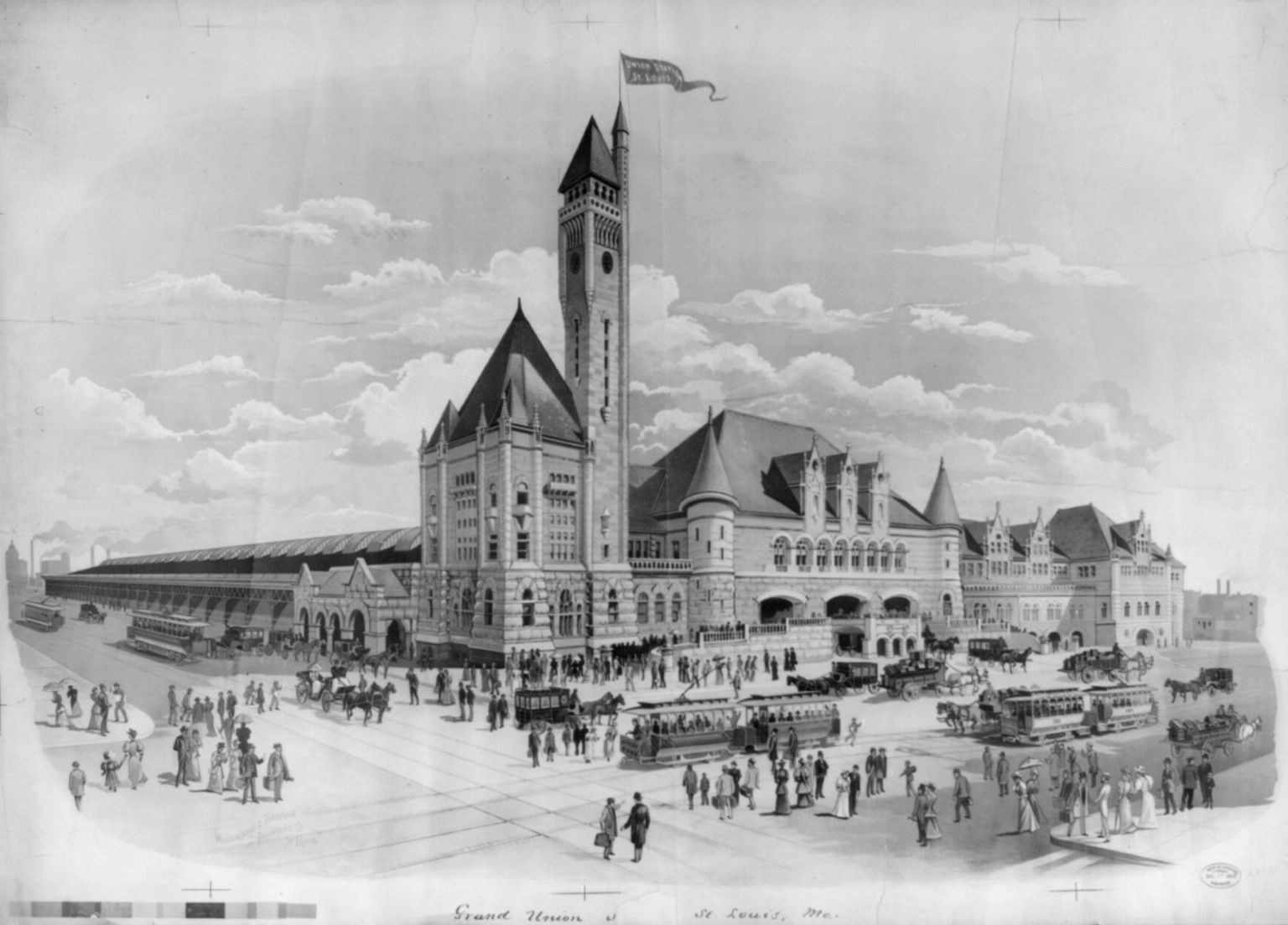
Grand Union Station, St. Louis, 1894

=== Running away ===
Madeleine secretly packed her belongings and left Mrs. James' home. She hailed a streetcar and rode it to the end of the line, where she aimlessly wandered through a suburb of the city. Eventually Madeleine took refuge in a drugstore, where she bought stationery and a stamp and wrote a letter to Mrs. James. As she was leaving the drugstore, Madeleine was propositioned by the owner, who blocked her way out. When she lashed out angrily at him, he let her pass. She once again hailed a streetcar and this time rode to Union Station, where she bought food and set out to find a room for the night. After wandering outside the station Madeleine became frightened and retreated back to the station waiting room, where she subsequently fell asleep. She was woken by the Depot Master who, upon learning that she was not waiting for a train and had nowhere to go, took her to a hotel where she could spend the night.

After her first night alone in St. Louis, Madeleine set out to find work. Without connections or knowledge of the city, she had no success, and her money shortly ran out. Left alone and hungry in the cold October weather, Madeleine spent the night with a man for shelter who, when asked the next morning, refused to pay her. She subsequently took shelter in a department store, where she scavenged food scraps from a garbage bin and wrote two letters, one to Mrs. James and one to her Mother, assuring both that she was alright. That night, Madeleine found herself on the streets, where she was propositioned by a black man. After vehemently denying him, she created a commotion which drew the attention of another man, who stopped to see if she was hurt. When she explained her situation, the driver took Madeleine to a lodging house, where he provided her with a room, food, a bath, and money to buy breakfast the next morning before leaving and promising that they would have lunch together the next day.

Madeleine remained with this man, who she estimated to be about ten years her senior, for a number of days, and he continued to provide her with food, clothes, and lodging. Eventually, he explained to Madeleine that he had previously contracted a venereal disease but that his doctor had cured him. He asked Madeleine to sleep with him despite the risk of contracting the disease, and she agreed, feeling indebted after his generosity. Madeleine later accompanied her host to Kansas City on a business trip. During this time, Madeleine maintained correspondence with both her mother and Mrs. James, who helped hide the reality of her situation from her family.

== Entry into prostitution ==
=== Kansas City ===
After a week in Kansas City, Madeleine contracted the same disease that her host had previously contracted. As she was unable to travel, the man left Madeleine in the care of a physician and with enough money to take care of herself, asking her to return to him once she was healthy again. While in the hospital, Madeleine became acquainted with a prostitute named Mamie, who worked at a house on Fourth Street and had been in the business for six years. Mamie talked to Madeleine about her job and advised the girl to go to a house, which would provide some measure of comfort and protection, once she lost the man who was supporting her. She insisted that Madeleine should never go to the streets.

During her stay in the hospital, Madeleine continued to receive letters from the man in St. Louis. After three weeks, she was well enough to return to him. However, at this point Madeleine was about six months pregnant and would no longer be able to keep her condition secret. Rather than tell him the truth, she contacted Mamie, who in turn put Madeleine into contact with her landlady, Miss Laura. A few days later, Madeleine began living and working at Miss Laura's brothel, where she first took on the name Madeleine Blair.

=== Miss Laura's brothel ===
Miss Laura's house was one of three first-class brothels in Kansas City; Miss Laura had started as prostitute herself, and she treated the girls fairly and kindly. However, Madeleine's reluctance to entertain the men and her dislike for liquor made it difficult for her to adjust to her new occupation. Eventually, Miss Laura introduced Madeleine to a man, Paul Martin, who would become her supporter, lover, and confidant for many years. While he looked down upon prostitution as undesirable but necessary, he quickly became partial to Madeleine and visited her frequently. When he left town, he continued to write her letters.

As her pregnancy progressed, Madeleine received support from the other girls in the brothel, many of whom were excited for the baby. However, the pregnancy was difficult for Madeleine—who did not want the baby—and was made more difficult by the venereal disease she had previously contracted. When Madeleine refused to see the house physician, Miss Laura called a friend who was a physician to care for Madeleine. Madeleine's baby daughter died either during or shortly after the birth, but the doctor became a close friend during her time in his care. Once Madeleine had recovered, the doctor offered to support her in returning home and seeking an education. Madeleine accepted his offer, with encouragement from the other girls in the brothel as well as Miss Laura.

== Chicago ==
=== Return home ===
Madeleine and the doctor arranged to meet Mrs. James in St. Louis, who would help conceal from her family the true story of how Madeleine had met her benefactor. The three decided that Madeleine should return home for a visit before coming back to St. Louis to attend a private school. Madeleine was greeted warmly by her family upon her return. Her father was once again absent, and the family hadn't heard from him since he had written from Eastern Illinois three months previously. Madeleine also learned that her older brother would leave in June to go West with the firm he had been working for. When she informed her of the plans to attend school in St. Louis, Madeleine was unable to assuage her mother's doubts. Not wanting to raise suspicions as to how she had met her doctor friend, she decided instead to go to Chicago to seek work. Her mother consented to this plan, and Madeleine wrote letters to Mrs. James and the doctor to inform them of the situation. She additionally wrote a letter to Paul, telling him that she had left prostitution.

=== Arrival in Chicago ===
Madeleine arrived in Chicago shortly after her eighteenth birthday. She found lodging in a south-side boarding house and got a job in a large department store, where she made good money and ingratiated herself with the customers. During this time, Madeleine continued her correspondence with both Paul and the doctor.

Some time after her arrival in Chicago, Madeleine received a letter which informed her of bad news from home. Her brother had fallen sick out West and was unable to send money home, and her father had been in jail for two months in a different town. Upon the discovery of her father's imprisonment, the sheriff had gone to check on the condition of Madeleine's family. Finding them living in poverty, with Madeleine's mother sick, it was decided that her mother would be sent to the county poorhouse and the rest of the children would be taken away. Madeleine promptly quit her job at the department store, left her boarding house, and sent a letter to her mother containing money and saying that she had received a pay raise and would be able to support the family.

=== Custom House Place ===
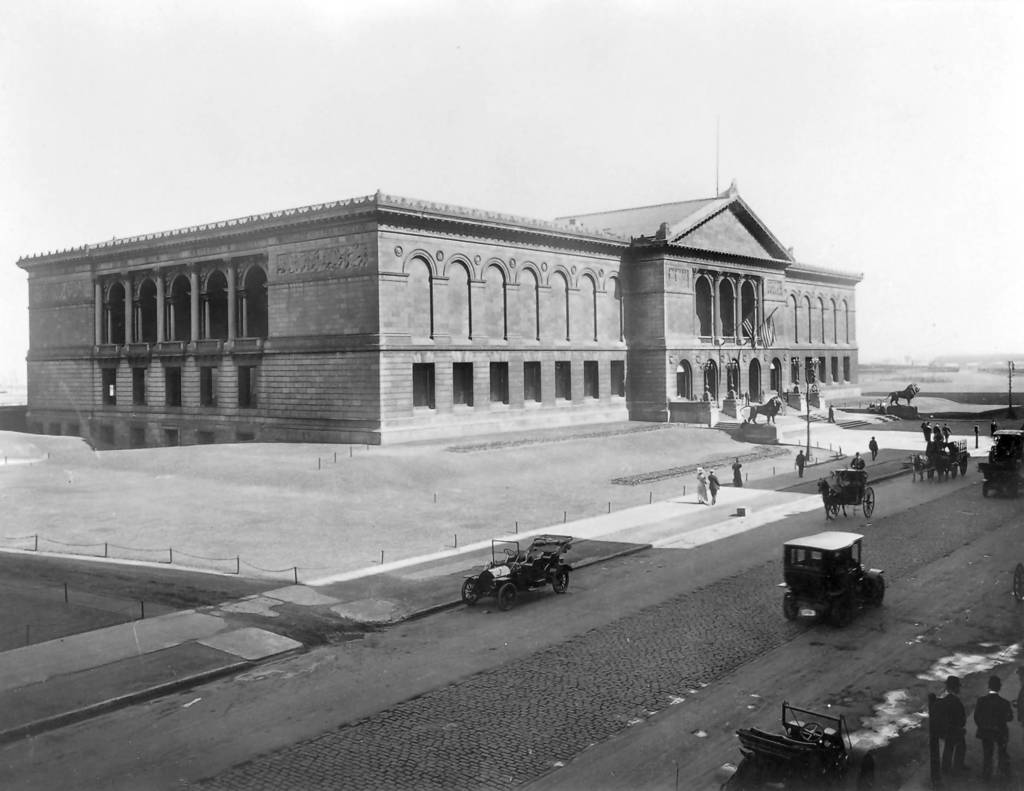
Chicago Art Institute, 1900

After quitting her job, Madeleine sought out a department store customer, Madame C., a French-Canadian who ran the brothel Custom House Place. Following a brief interview, Madame agreed to lodge Madeleine, and she began to work as a prostitute once again. Due to Madeleine's continued disdain for both prostitution and liquor, however, she was quickly rejected by the other girls of the house. On her first night of work, Madeleine met a customer who suggested that she seek work instead at a higher caliber house on Dearborn Street that was run more fairly than Custom House Place.

After her first night in Custom House Place, Madeleine wrote to both Paul and the doctor informing them that she had returned to prostitution. She additionally wrote a letter to her mother, comforting her, and to an Eastern relative, explaining her father's situation and asking for help for the family. Madeleine continued to work for three weeks at Custom House Place, which she found to be a cutthroat and hostile environment. Many of the girls working in the house were children of immigrants who had been brought up as part of the city's working class, and Madeleine viewed them as morally degraded. However, she was extremely successful financially.

After saving some money, Madeleine contacted the customer who had initially suggested she find work on Dearborn Street and asked for his help in leaving Custom House Place. He recruited a friend, and the three were successful in tricking Madame C. into letting Madeleine leave without any fuss. The two men who had helped her paid for Madeleine to spend two weeks in a hotel, during which time she explored the city and discovered a love for art at the Art Institute. The initial customer became a sort of father figure to Madeleine, encouraging her in her studies of literature and the Bible.

=== Dearborn Street ===
After her brief vacation, Madeleine sought work at the house on Dearborn Street. There, she was hired by Miss Allen, an austere and civilized woman who ran the first-class house with an iron fist. On her first night, an older prostitute named Olga Howard took Madeleine under her wing. The two soon became friends, and Madeleine found that the girls at Miss Allen's house—who, she describes, "were of good American stock and possessed some degree of education" —were less competitive and more cooperative than the girls at Custom House Place had been. Madeleine worked on and off at Miss Allen's house for the next five years, and even the cold mistress eventually grew fond of her.

During her first few months at the house on Dearborn Street, Madeleine continued her studies and delighted in learning from the upper class customers that she serviced. After five months, however, she discovered that she was pregnant once again. Madeleine decided to leave Miss Allen's house to visit home, but changed her plans when she received a letter from Paul, who was in Kansas City. Upon visiting him there, Paul asked Madeleine to move to Montana and marry him. Madeleine refused, informing Paul that she was pregnant. They parted ways after their brief visit, and Madeleine went to visit her family.

After arriving home, Madeleine stayed with her family for two weeks. Her father, who had been released from prison, was sober and had been diagnosed with Bright's disease. Unable to believe the stories that Madeleine offered, he went to Chicago to investigate and discovered that his daughter had been working as a prostitute. The two fought, and her father ensured that Madeleine was disowned from the family; she never saw her mother or siblings again. Her father died three years later.

== Motherhood ==
=== Return to Dearborn Street ===
Following her visit to her family, Madeleine returned to Chicago. She gave birth to a son, who she loved dearly. Eight months after his birth, she returned to her work at the house on Dearborn Street. She continued her correspondence with Paul, who visited her twice in Chicago and sometimes sent money to support her. When her son was two years old, the financial strain of caring for her child forced Madeleine to leave him with a nurse and go to Winnipeg, where the cost of living was cheaper and prostitutes could make more money.

=== Winnipeg ===
In Winnipeg, Madeleine worked at the brothel of Madame von Levin. The house stood on the prairie about two miles outside of town, and the girls who worked there were mostly Americans. Madeleine found the men to be more agreeable than those she had encountered in the cities where she had worked previously, and she spent many happy hours exploring the nature that surrounded the brothel. After saving up money, she returned to Chicago. Upon her return, however, Madeleine found the house where she had left her son deserted.

=== Kidnapping ===
Her nurse's neighbors informed Madeleine that the woman had left with the baby a week before, claiming that his mother had abandoned him. Madeleine wrote to the nurse and went to LaCrosse, Wisconsin, where the nurse's family lived, to search for the woman. With the help of local police, Madeleine was able to track down the nurse. Once the situation was explained, the girl's mother insisted that she return Madeleine's son.

=== Chicago ===
Back in Chicago, Madeleine began renting a flat and devoted herself to raising her son. Reluctant to bring customers into the home where her child lived, she found work at a brothel on Indiana Avenue, in the South Side of the city. The owner of the brothel agreed that Madeleine could spend her days at her flat with her son as long as she spent nights working. Many of the women who worked at the house on Indiana Avenue with Madeleine were of a higher social status than the other prostitutes that she had worked with; some were engaged or married women who worked secretly for the extra money, and others were respected students at the Conservatory of Music or the Art Institute. Most of these women, like Madeleine, kept their profession secret from the public.

After some time, a disagreement over a customer with the woman who ran the brothel resulted in Madeleine leaving her work at the house on Indiana Avenue. She took a break from working and subsequently devoted all her time to her son. Her happy respite was interrupted, however, when she visited a doctor and discovered that she was fourth months pregnant. Upon returning from the doctor, Madeleine found that her son had grown sick with pneumonia. She sent for the physician that she had just visited, but the man was ultimately unable to help. After six days, the boy died.

Olga arranged for the child's funeral and contacted Paul, who came to visit in hopes of comforting Madeleine. However, she lashed out angrily at him and refused to see him; he returned to Montana. A month after her son's death, Madeleine ended her third pregnancy by inducing a miscarriage; she discovered that she would have had twins. She nearly died from peritonitis but recovered; following her recovery, she returned to work at Miss Allen's house. She was twenty two.

== Journey West ==
=== Butte, Montana ===
After some time back at Miss Allen's, Olga convinced Madeleine to go to Montana and seek out Paul, hoping the trip would lift her friend's spirits. Upon her arrival, Madeleine discovered that Paul would be out of town for several weeks. While exploring the town on her own, she happened across a man who had been her customer in Chicago. The two spent the evening together, visiting Butte's variety shows and dance halls as well as its "cribs," which inspired pity and horror in Madeleine. At the cribs, Madeleine ran into another acquaintance from Chicago—this time a girl, Norma, who had worked with her at Miss Allen's house. After a tearful reunion, Norma explained that she had fallen onto hard times and discouraged Madeleine from boarding at any of the brothels in Butte, where she would certainly fall into debt.

=== Reunion with Paul ===
Madeleine wrote to Paul to inform him that she had traveled to Butte to see him and he responded enthusiastically, inviting her to come to the remote mining town where he was working. Disgusted with the vice she saw in Butte, Madeleine was happy to leave, and the two were reunited two days later.

Madeleine spent the summer exploring the little mining town, going horseback riding, and keeping Paul company. The people of the town, knowing nothing of her past, assumed that she was an Eastern schoolteacher. Although she and Paul butted heads over his desire to send her to college, these were happy days for Madeleine.

=== Return to Butte ===
After two months, Madeleine and Paul returned to Butte. To avoid scandal, the two lived in separate hotels, and Madeleine began to see Paul less. Eventually, she met another previous customer from Chicago and accepted his invitation to dinner, where he introduced her to poker. Thus began a gambling addiction that Madeleine would struggle with the rest of her life.

Although Paul continued to support Madeleine, her gambling created a rift between the two of them. Unable to bring herself to continue asking Paul for money and unwilling to make money as a prostitute while the two were together, Madeleine left him and returned East.

=== Wandering ===
In her autobiography, Madeleine describes, "For the next three or four years I wandered over the face of the earth, always finding that the place I was in was the one place where I did not want to be." She indicates that she traveled across not only America but also Europe, the Orient, Canada, and Mexico. Throughout her wanderings, she met fellow prostitutes of every sort. Paul continued to assist her in times of need, and her journeys ended when she returned for a year to live with him. During this year, she stopped gambling.

== Canada ==
=== Visit to Nona ===
When she was twenty eight years old, Madeleine heard that an old friend, Nona Blake, had opened a brothel in Calgary, and decided to visit for six weeks. However, Madeleine quickly grew tired with the monotony and bad weather that came with her friend's isolated location. She decided to cut her visit short and go to Banff, despite Nona's protests.

=== Madeleine's brothel ===
After spending a month in Banff, Madeleine resolved to stay in Canada and open a brothel of her own rather than returning to Paul. She subsequently traveled to Edmonton in search of a location to begin her new business. There, she learned of a town where the Mounted Police would allow a brothel to be opened so long as the owner didn't let the establishment become too conspicuous. Madeleine traveled to this town and met with both the commandant of the Mounted Police and the chief of the Municipal Police, who agreed to let her open a brothel as long as she maintained order. Despite protests from Paul, Madeleine bought an eight-room house, determined to become financially independent.

After buying her house, Madeleine hired a Chinese boy, Fawn Kee, to work as a cook. He soon became a loyal friend and confidant. Madeleine then sent for three girls she knew from the United States, and she opened her brothel in late November. Upon its opening, the house was wildly successful and attracted men from all social classes of the town. Madeleine soon had to expand her business; she hired a pianist, more girls, and an assistant for Fawn Kee. She also added multiple rooms to the house.

Madeleine's relationship with Paul suffered during this time, but her business remained successful. She became known as a "strict disciplinarian," but was liked by many of her girls for her fair treatment. After two years in business, she hired a longtime acquaintance, Mildred, as a housekeeper. Madeleine was an adept businesswoman, and with help from both Mildred and Fawn Kee she dealt with political and legal scandals during her time as a brothel owner.

=== Alcoholism ===
After four years operating her brothel, Madeleine began secretly drinking to cope with insomnia and the stress of running her business. A new house that had opened nearby brought increased competition and increased attention to the prostitution in the town, which eventually entangled Madeleine in trouble with the Mounted Police. Under mounting pressure, Madeleine began a drinking spree that ended when Mildred encouraged her to take a vacation until she was well enough to run the house again.

Madeleine left for Spokane, where she spent her money drinking and gambling. After losing a large sum of money and falling ill, she contacted Paul, who came for a week to support her. Following his visit, Madeleine spent the next four months traveling across the West Coast. When she returned to her brothel, she found that it was running smoothly thanks to Mildred and Fawn Kee.

After two months back in Canada, however, Madeleine once again succumbed to alcoholism. A young doctor who served as the medical examiner for her house contacted Paul, who took Madeleine away and left the brothel under Mildred's care once again. Madeleine remained sober while she was with Paul, but their time was cut short when she heard rumors that he was engaged to another woman. Madeleine left him and returned to her brothel, where she continued to drink heavily.

At age thirty four, Madeleine had been drinking heavily for two years. In deep despair, she went to visit a priest that had recently taken up residence in town. He prayed for Madeleine and told her to abstain from liquor for one year. Madeleine returned to her brothel, packed her things, and gave the house to Mildred, leaving the business behind her for the rest of her life.
